= Bergen Street =

Bergen Street may refer to:

- Bergen Street (IND Culver Line)
- Bergen Street (IRT Eastern Parkway Line)
