= IRT Eastern Parkway Line =

New York City Subway line

- The 2, 3, 4, and 5 trains are the primary services at most IRT Eastern Parkway Line stations, and thus the only IRT services that travel to/from Brooklyn.

Overview
- Status: Operating
- Owner: City of New York
- Locale: Brooklyn
- Termini: Borough Hall; Crown Heights–Utica Avenue
- Stations: 11

Service
- Type: Rapid transit
- System: New York City Subway
- Operator: New York City Transit Authority
- Daily ridership: 91,891

History
- Opened: January 9, 1908; 118 years ago
- Last extension: 1920

Technical
- Num of tracks: 4
- Character: Underground
- Track gauge: 4 ft 8 1/2 in (1,435 mm)
- Electrification: 600V DC third rail
Route map
| Express station | Local station |

The IRT Eastern Parkway Line is one of the lines of the A Division of the New York City Subway. Built for the Interborough Rapid Transit Company (IRT), it stretches from Downtown Brooklyn south along Flatbush Avenue and east along Eastern Parkway to Crown Heights. After passing Utica Avenue, the line rises onto an elevated structure and becomes the New Lots Line to the end at New Lots Avenue in East New York, Brooklyn. The west end of the Eastern Parkway Line is at the Joralemon Street Tunnel under the East River. (Note: Sources differ over the extent of the Eastern Parkway Line or whether it is even a separate line. In a 1981 list of "most deteriorated subway stations", the MTA listed Borough Hall and Court Street stations as part of the New Lots Line. The chaining designation "M" (Joralemon Street Tunnel) becomes "E" (Eastern Parkway Line) just west of the Borough Hall platforms; the Court Street and northern Borough Hall stations are chained "K" (Clark Street Tunnel). However, as of 2007, emergency exit signs label Court Street as an IRT Broadway–Seventh Avenue Line station, and the two parts of Borough Hall are signed as being along the Broadway–Seventh Avenue and IRT Lexington Avenue Lines.)

The IRT Nostrand Avenue Line splits from the local tracks of the Eastern Parkway Line east of the Franklin Avenue station.

== History ==
=== Contract 2 line ===
The Eastern Parkway Line to Atlantic Avenue is part of Contract 2 of the Interborough Rapid Transit Company's plan to construct an extension of the original subway, Contract 1. Contract 2 extended the original line from City Hall in Manhattan to Atlantic Avenue in Brooklyn. The Board of Rapid Transit Commissioners approved the route on September 27, 1900, and the contract was signed on September 11, 1902. Construction commenced on Contract 2 on March 4, 1903. In order to cross the East River, a tunnel had to be constructed. That tunnel, the Joralemon Street Tunnel, was the first underwater subway tunnel connecting Manhattan and Brooklyn. It opened on January 9, 1908, extending the subway from Bowling Green to Borough Hall. Clifford Milburn Holland served as the assistant engineer during the construction of the tunnel. It was added to the U.S. National Register of Historic Places on February 9, 2006.

On April 28, 1908, the IRT formally applied with the New York Public Service Commission for permission to open the final section of the Contract 2 line from Borough Hall to Atlantic Avenue near the Flatbush Avenue LIRR station. The application was approved, and the IRT extension opened on May 1, 1908. With the opening of the IRT to Brooklyn on May 1, 1908, ridership fell off on the BRT's elevated and trolley lines over the Brooklyn Bridge with Brooklyn riders choosing to use the new subway. During the construction of the Brooklyn extension, provisions were made for future subway extensions in Brooklyn by the construction of four tracks between Borough Hall and Atlantic Avenue, and the construction of bellmouths at Fulton Street and Flatbush Avenue, at Flatbush Avenue and Lafayette Avenue, and at Atlantic Avenue and Fourth Avenue.

On May 26, 1908, the IRT applied with the Public Service Commission to build a route connecting with these provisions along Flatbush Avenue from Fulton Street along the Manhattan Bridge, connecting with the IRT Third Avenue Line at Canal Street and Bowery.

=== Dual Contracts expansion ===
==== Eastern Parkway and Flatbush Avenue ====
In 1913, New York City, the Brooklyn Rapid Transit Company, and the Interborough Rapid Transit Company (IRT) reached an agreement, known as the Dual Contracts, to drastically expand subway service across New York City. As part of Contract 3 of the agreement, between New York City and the IRT, the original subway opened by the IRT in 1904 to City Hall, and extended to Atlantic Avenue in 1908, was to be extended eastward into Brooklyn. The line was to be extended along Flatbush Avenue and Eastern Parkway to Buffalo Street as a four-track subway line, and then along East 98th Street and Livonia Avenue to New Lots Avenue as an elevated two-track line, with provisions for the addition of a third track. In addition, a two-track branch line along Nostrand Avenue branching off east of the Franklin Avenue station was to be constructed. The underground portion of the line became known as the Eastern Parkway Line, or Route 12, while the elevated portion became known as the New Lots Line.

The IRT Eastern Parkway Line was built as part of Route 12 from 1915 to 1918, from the section east of the Atlantic Avenue station to Utica Avenue and down the Nostrand Avenue Subway to Flatbush Avenue. Groundbreaking for the IRT extension took place on May 23, 1914, but actual work did not start for several weeks. The groundbreaking was section 1A, stretching between Grand Army Plaza and St. Mark's Avenue. The Cranford Company received a construction contract for this section in March 1914 after making a low bid of about $2.2 million, The section between Atlantic Avenue and St. Mark's Avenue was placed for bidding in June 1914; the Transit Company made a low bid of $2.195 million for this contract.

Before construction on Eastern Parkway even began, Brooklyn park commissioner Raymond Ingersoll recommended that the plans be modified to avoid damaging trees on Eastern Parkway. As a result, plans for the line were changed in October 1914. Under the revised plan, the four-track tunnel under Eastern Parkway was to be double-decked, except at the Franklin Avenue station, where all tracks would be on the same level. In April 1915, nineteen companies submitted bids to construct the section of line between Grand Army Plaza and Nostrand Avenue. The low bidder for this contract was the Inter-Continental Company. which bid $2.7 million; the contract was confirmed that May. The next contract was for the section between Nostrand Avenue and Buffalo Avenue, Rodgers & Hagerty Inc. submitted a $2.17 low bid for the Nostrand–Buffalo Avenues contract in July 1915. although New York City's acting mayor and the New York City Board of Estimate initially refused to approve the contract.

The tunnel between Grand Army Plaza and Nostrand Avenue was built using the cut-and-cover method, with two steam shovels excavating an estimated 600,000 cubic yards (460,000 m^{3}). Dirt from the excavation of the tunnel was used to infill the old Brighton Beach Race Course. Mayor John Francis Hylan inspected the line on August 20, 1920, prior to its official opening. At 12:40 a.m. on August 23, 1920, the Eastern Parkway Line was extended from Atlantic Avenue to Utica Avenue. The new lines would be served by trains from Seventh Avenue. Trains did not make stops between Atlantic Avenue and Franklin Avenue because of the failure of the contractor to perform work as scheduled on the local stations. On October 10, 1920, the three stations that had not opened with the rest of the line, at Bergen Street, Grand Army Plaza and Eastern Parkway–Brooklyn Museum, were opened.

==== Clark Street Tunnel ====
In addition, as part of Contract 3, the IRT agreed to build a branch of the original subway line south down Seventh Avenue, Varick Street, and West Broadway to serve the West Side of Manhattan. South of Chambers Street, there were to be two branches constructed. One of these branches would turn eastward under Park Place and Beekman Street and down William Street and Old Slip. After going through Lower Manhattan, the second branch would go through a tunnel under the East River before running under Clark and Fulton Streets until a junction at Borough Hall with the existing Contract 2 IRT Brooklyn Line, using a provision meant for a line over the Manhattan Bridge. Construction of the Clark Street Tunnel began on October 12, 1914, using a tunneling shield in conjunction with compressed air. The north tube was holed through on November 28, 1916. At 5,900 feet long, with about 3,100 feet underwater, the tunnel was finally opened for revenue service on April 15, 1919. The opening of the tunnel allowed access to Brooklyn via the IRT from both the East and West Sides of Manhattan.

=== Later history ===
On February 2, 1948, the platform extensions at Hoyt Street opened, allowing 10-car express trains to board as opposed to only 5-car trains.

In August 1961, the chairman of the New York City Transit Authority, Charles Patterson, announced a $2.5 million project that would get rid of a trouble spot on the line between Nevins Street and Atlantic Avenue that slows service and backs up the IRT Division. The project was projected to take two years long and it would have involved the reconfiguration of the track layout in this area. The platforms at the two stations would be extended to accommodate 10-car trains, as opposed to the eight and nine-car trains that they could platform at the time. The tracks between the two stations would be straightened, removing some of the bend in the tracks, but not removing it entirely. The tracks were to be straightened enough to allow for the running time between the two stations to be cut by one to two minutes.

During the 1964–1965 fiscal year, the platforms at Bergen Street, Grand Army Plaza, Eastern Parkway, Nostrand Avenue and Kingston Avenue were lengthened to 525 feet to accommodate a ten-car train of 51-foot IRT cars.

The MTA announced in October 2020 that it would renovate the Eastern Parkway Line tunnels between Borough Hall and Franklin Avenue. The project was expected to take 33 months. The renovations were announced following two incidents in 2018, when ceilings at the Borough Hall and Atlantic Avenue stations partially collapsed, injuring passengers.

== Extent and service ==
The following services use part or all of the IRT Eastern Parkway Line:

| | Time period | | | Section of line |
| | rush hours and middays | evenings and weekends | late nights | Section of line |
|---|---|---|---|---|
| "2" train | local | | | Hoyt St to Franklin Ave–Medgar Evers College |
| "3" train | local | | no service | south of Hoyt St |
| "4" train | express | | local (skips Hoyt Street) | north of Utica Ave (all except nights) full line (nights) |
| "5" train | express | no service | | north of Franklin Ave–Medgar Evers College |

=== Route description ===
The IRT Eastern Parkway Line enters Brooklyn through the Joralemon Street Tunnel from the IRT Lexington Avenue Line and continues to run under the street that the tunnel was named after, until after Borough Hall. East of the Borough Hall station, at Adams Street and Boerum Plaza, the IRT Broadway–Seventh Avenue Line merges with the line. The Eastern Parkway Line continues as a four-track line under Fulton Street, then turns southeast under Flatbush Avenue, which also has the BMT Brighton Line beneath it. The first station along this segment is Nevins Street, which contains a never used lower level, and then joins Atlantic Avenue–Barclays Center, the end of the oldest section of the line. Between Bergen Street and Grand Army Plaza, the line splits around the BMT Brighton Line.

East of Grand Army Plaza, the line finally moves under its namesake, the first station serving the Brooklyn Museum. The next station is a complex near the Brooklyn Botanic Garden that serves the above ground BMT Franklin Avenue Line and the beginning of the IRT Nostrand Avenue Line, which branches off to the south shortly afterwards at Nostrand Junction. The last three stations are a two-over-two track layout with a platform on each level. Afterwards, the IRT Eastern Parkway Line ends under Ralph Avenue, one block east of its originally intended terminus, whereas the local tracks become the IRT New Lots Line, branching off to the southeast emerging from the ground near Buffalo Avenue at Lincoln Terrace Park. The line was built mostly with two levels, with southbound trains on the upper level, and northbound trains on the lower level to protect the trees in the north median of Eastern Parkway to the greatest extent possible.

== Station listing ==
Station service legend
| Stops all times | Stops 24 hours a day |
| Stops all times except late nights | Stops every day during daytime hours only |
| Stops late nights only | Stops every day during overnight hours only |
| Stops weekdays during the day | Stops during weekday daytime hours only |
| Stops rush hours only | Stops during weekday rush hours only |
Time period details
| Disabled access | Station is compliant with the Americans with Disabilities Act |
| ↑ | Station is compliant with the Americans with Disabilities Act in the indicated direction only |
| ↓ | Station is compliant with the Americans with Disabilities Act in the indicated direction only |
| | Elevator access to mezzanine only |

| Neighborhood (approximate) | Disabled access | Station | Tracks | Services | Opened | Transfers and notes |
Express tracks continue from the IRT Lexington Avenue Line Express tracks via the Joralemon Street Tunnel (4 5 )
Downtown Brooklyn
| Downtown Brooklyn | Disabled access | Borough Hall | all | 4 5 | January 9, 1908 | 2 3 (IRT Broadway–Seventh Avenue Line); R (BMT Fourth Avenue Line at Court Street) |
| Downtown Brooklyn | Local tracks continue from the IRT Broadway–Seventh Avenue Line Brooklyn Branch (2 3 ) | | | | | |
| Downtown Brooklyn | ↓ | Hoyt Street | local | 2 3 | May 1, 1908 | Station is ADA-accessible in the southbound direction only. |
| Downtown Brooklyn | | Nevins Street | all | 2 3 4 5 | May 1, 1908 | |
| Downtown Brooklyn | Disabled access | Atlantic Avenue–Barclays Center | all | 2 3 4 5 | May 1, 1908 | B Q (BMT Brighton Line); D N R W (BMT Fourth Avenue Line); Connection to LIRR at Atlantic Terminal |
| Prospect Heights | | Bergen Street | local | 2 3 4 | October 10, 1920 | |
| Prospect Heights | | Grand Army Plaza | local | 2 3 4 | October 10, 1920 | |
| Prospect Heights | Disabled access | Eastern Parkway–Brooklyn Museum | local | 2 3 4 | October 10, 1920 | |
| Crown Heights | | Franklin Avenue–Medgar Evers College | all | 2 3 4 5 | August 23, 1920 | S (BMT Franklin Avenue Line at Botanic Garden) |
| Crown Heights | IRT Nostrand Avenue Line splits from the local tracks (2 5 ) at Nostrand Junction | | | | | |
| Crown Heights | | Nostrand Avenue | local | 2 3 4 5 | August 23, 1920 | B44 Select Bus Service |
| Crown Heights | | Kingston Avenue | local | 2 3 4 5 | August 23, 1920 | |
| Crown Heights | Disabled access | Crown Heights–Utica Avenue | all | 2 3 4 5 | August 23, 1920 | B46 Select Bus Service |
Express tracks end
Local tracks continue as the IRT New Lots Line (2 3 4 5 )
