= Grand Army Plaza station =

New York City Subway station in Brooklyn

Grand Army Plaza
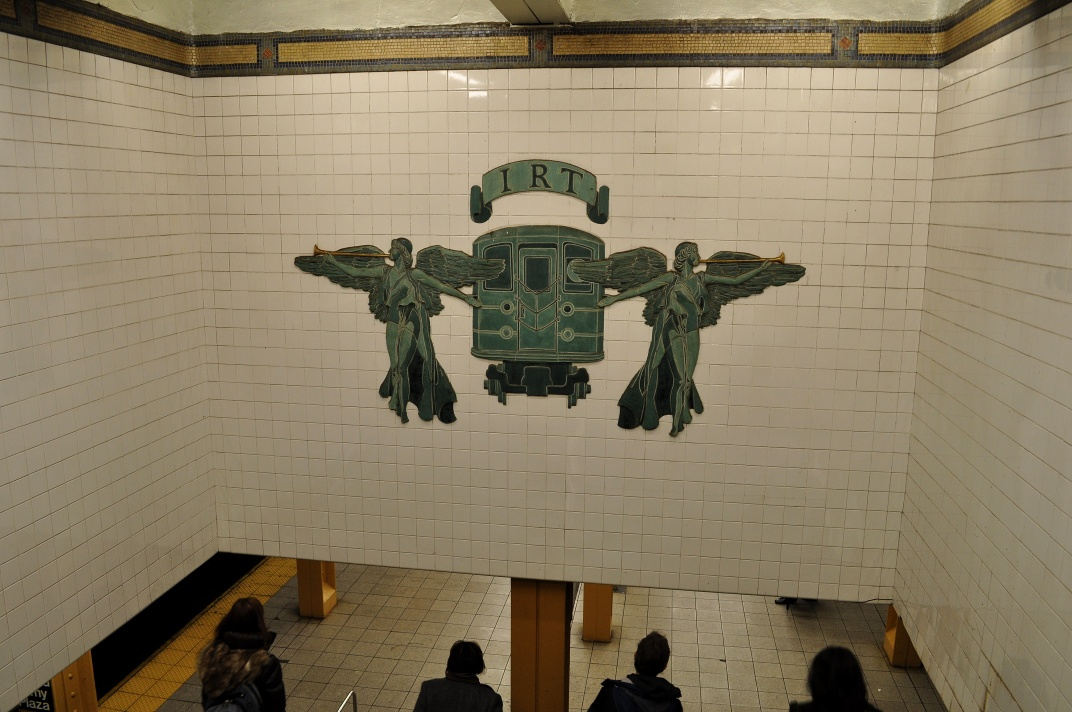
- Wings for the IRT: The Irresistible Romance of Travel artwork on the mezzanine level of the station

Station statistics
- Address: Plaza Street West, St. Johns Place, & Flatbush Avenue; Brooklyn, New York
- Borough: Brooklyn
- Locale: Park Slope
- Coordinates: 40.674584°N 73.970518°W
- Division: A (IRT)
- Line: IRT Eastern Parkway Line
- Services: 2 (all times); 3 (all except late nights); 4 (late nights, and limited rush hour service)
- Transit: NYCT Bus: B41, B67, B69
- Structure: Underground
- Platforms: 1 island platform
- Tracks: 4 (2 on each level)

Other information
- Opened: October 10, 1920; 106 years ago
- Accessible: No; planned
- Former/other names: Grand Army Plaza – Prospect Park Prospect Park Plaza

Traffic
- 2025: 1,754,076 ▲1.4%
- Rank: 203 out of 423
Services
Preceding station	New York City Subway	Following station
Bergen Street 2 3 4 via 135th Street	Local	Eastern Parkway–Brooklyn Museum 2 3 4 via Franklin Avenue–Medgar Evers College
does not stop here
Location
Location within New York City Subway
Location within New York City
Location within New York
Track layout
Street map
Station service legend
Symbol	Description
Stops all times except late nights	Stops all times except late nights
Stops all times	Stops all times
Stops late nights only	Stops late nights only

The Grand Army Plaza station is a local station on the IRT Eastern Parkway Line of the New York City Subway. It is located in Park Slope, Brooklyn, underneath Flatbush Avenue at its intersection with Plaza Street West and St. Johns Place, on the northwest side of Grand Army Plaza. It is served by the 2 train at all times, and by the 3 train at all times except late nights, when the 4 train takes over service.

== History ==
=== Construction and opening ===
After the Interborough Rapid Transit Company (IRT)'s original line opened as far as Atlantic Avenue in Brooklyn, the New York City government began planning new lines. As early as 1903, William Barclay Parsons, chief engineer of the Rapid Transit Commission, had proposed constructing a four-track extension of the IRT line under Flatbush Avenue, running southeast from Atlantic Avenue to Grand Army Plaza. From there, two branches would have extended south to Flatbush and east to Brownsville. This plan did not progress for a decade due to various disputes over the original subway. In 1913, New York City, the Brooklyn Rapid Transit Company (BRT), and the IRT reached an agreement, known as the Dual Contracts, to drastically expand subway service across New York City. As part of the Dual Contracts, two lines under Flatbush Avenue, one each operated by the BRT and IRT, were approved. The IRT was authorized to extend its four-track Brooklyn line under Flatbush Avenue and Eastern Parkway, while the BRT would construct a parallel two-track extension of the Brighton Line.

Groundbreaking for the IRT extension took place on May 23, 1914. The Prospect Park Plaza station, at Grand Army Plaza was to be one of the stations on the IRT extension. The Grand Army Plaza station was built as part of section 1A of the Eastern Parkway Line, stretching between the plaza and St. Mark's Avenue. The Cranford Company received a construction contract for this section in March 1914 after making a low bid of about $2.2 million. The project involved digging under Grand Army Plaza, near the Soldiers' and Sailors' Arch.

Service on the IRT Eastern Parkway Line had been extended from Atlantic Avenue to Utica Avenue in August 1920, but the Bergen Street, Grand Army Plaza, and Eastern Parkway–Brooklyn Museum stations were not ready to open with the rest of the line. The contractor responsible for completing the three stations had gone bankrupt in the middle of the project. The stations opened on October 9, 1920. The BMT Brighton Line was already in use at the time but used trackage that is now part of the Franklin Avenue Shuttle; the opening of the subway line beneath Flatbush Avenue provided a more direct route to Downtown Brooklyn and, eventually, Manhattan. The station was originally known as the Prospect Park Plaza station, but it was renamed in 1926 when the plaza itself was rededicated as Grand Army Plaza.

=== Later years ===
The construction of the station and tunnels resulted in the removal of Frederic W. Darlington's 1897 Electric Fountain from the center of Grand Army Plaza, which was dug up for the cut-and-cover construction and replaced with a grass oval. Planning for a new fountain, known as the Bailey Fountain, began in 1928, and it was completed in 1932.

During the 1964–1965 fiscal year, the platforms at Grand Army Plaza, along with those at four other stations on the Eastern Parkway Line, were lengthened to 525 feet (160 m) to accommodate a ten-car train of 51 foot (16 m) IRT cars. The work was performed by the Arthur A. Johnson Corporation. In April 1993, the New York State Legislature agreed to give the MTA $9.6 billion for capital improvements. Some of the funds would be used to renovate nearly one hundred New York City Subway stations, including Grand Army Plaza. The renovation was completed in 1996.

In May 2025, a temporary art installation called "Rex's Dino Store" opened inside a vacant storefront at the station. Created by the artists Sarah Cassidy and Akiva Leffert, the installation mimics a bodega with dinosaur-themed products. In July 2025, the MTA announced that it would install elevators at 12 stations, including the Grand Army Plaza station, as part of its 2025–2029 capital program. The elevators would make the station fully compliant with the Americans with Disabilities Act of 1990.

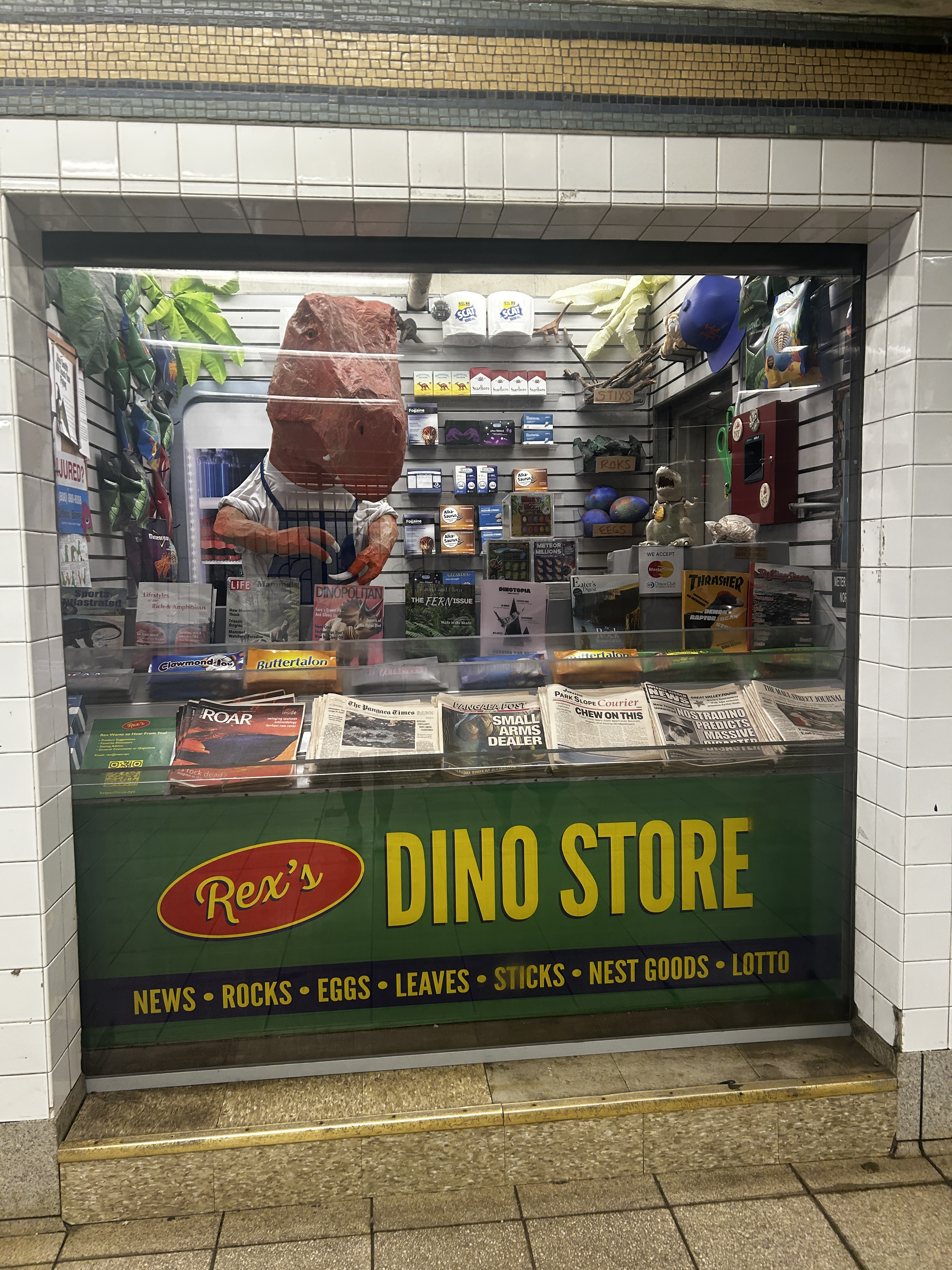
Rex's Dino Store at the Grand Army Plaza Station

== Station layout ==
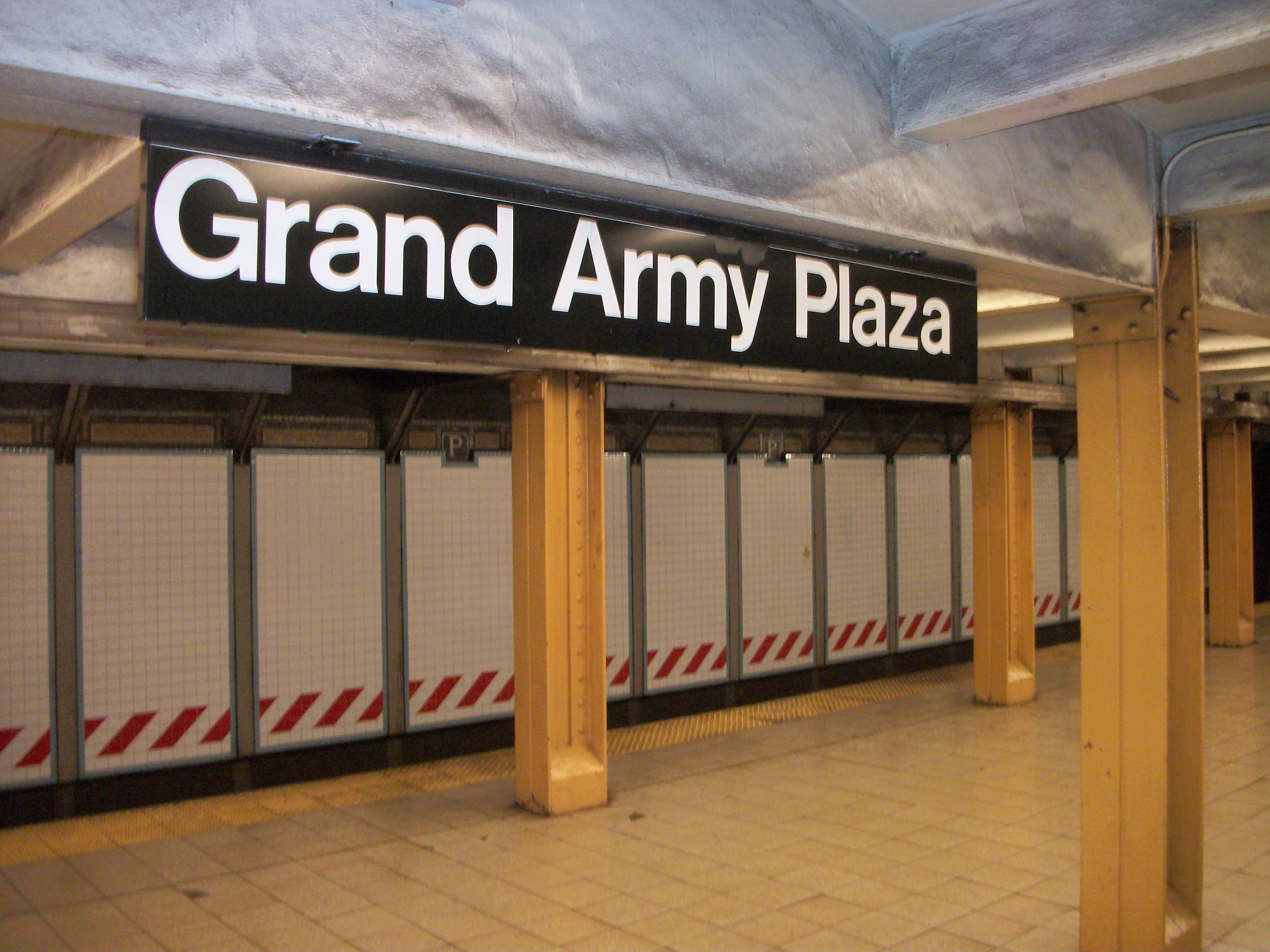
A view of the station's platform

At platform level, Grand Army Plaza has a simple island platform layout with two tracks. The 2 train stops here at all times, while the 3 train stops here at all times except late nights. The 4 train serves the station only during late nights. The next station to the north is Bergen Street, while the next station to the south is Eastern Parkway–Brooklyn Museum. Fixed platform barriers, which are intended to prevent commuters falling to the tracks, are positioned near the platform edges.

Southbound (eastern Brooklyn-bound) trains use track E1 while northbound (Manhattan-bound) trains use track E4. Underneath the platform are four tracks, the center two, A4 (north) and A3 (south) carrying the BMT Brighton Line with tracks E2 and E3 carrying southbound and northbound express IRT Eastern Parkway Line trains on either side of the Brighton Line tracks, respectively. These track designations are only displayed on small emergency placards on either end of the platform for use by train and emergency personnel; they are not used in everyday conversation.

The only mosaic in the Grand Army Plaza station is a small "P". A permanent art installation in the station's entrances and mezzanine entitled Wings for the IRT: The Irresistible Romance of Travel was created in 1995 by Jane Greengold, who used the station regularly when she lived in Park Slope. The bronze and terra cotta pieces of art are modeled on the original Interborough Rapid Transit Company logo, and alludes to the Soldiers' and Sailors' Arch in the plaza above with its Winged Victories. The MTA's Arts for Transit program held an opening ceremony for the artwork on June 19, 1997.

=== Exits ===
The station has four entrances and exits, all of which are staircases:

- 2 on the northeast corner of Flatbush Avenue and Plaza Street East
- 1 on the southwest corner of Flatbush Avenue and Plaza Street West
- 1 on the southeast corner of Flatbush Avenue and Plaza Street West
