= Borough Hall/Court Street station =

New York City Subway station in Brooklyn

Borough Hall/Court Street
- New York City Subway station complex
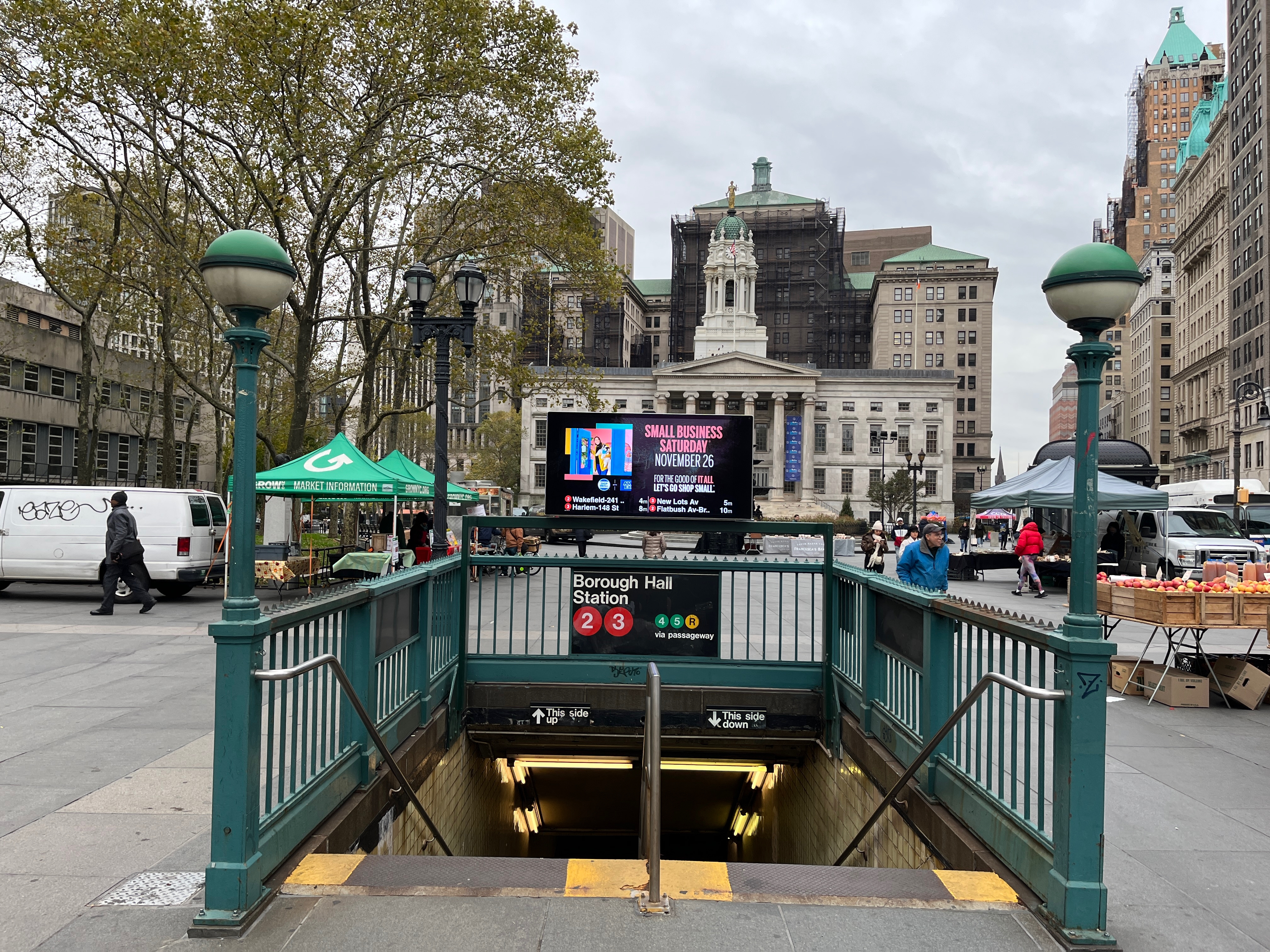

Station statistics
- Address: Court Street between Joralemon Street & Montague Street; Brooklyn, New York
- Borough: Brooklyn
- Locale: Downtown Brooklyn, Brooklyn Heights
- Coordinates: 40°41′37″N 73°59′25″W
- Division: A (IRT), B (BMT)
- Line: BMT Fourth Avenue Line; IRT Broadway–Seventh Avenue Line; IRT Eastern Parkway Line
- Services: 2 (all times); 3 (all except late nights); 4 (all times); 5 (weekdays only); N (late nights); R (all times); W (limited rush hour service only)
- Transit: NYCT Bus: B25, B26, B38, B41, B45, B52, B57, B61, B63; MTA Bus: B103
- Levels: 3

Other information
- Opened: July 1, 1948 (transfer)
- Accessible: Partially (IRT local platforms and IRT express platforms only)

Traffic
- 2025: 6,261,766 ▲1.2%
- Rank: 42 out of 423
Location
Location within New York City Subway
Location within New York City
Location within New York
Street map
Station service legend
Symbol	Description
Stops all times except late nights	Stops all times except late nights
Stops all times	Stops all times
Stops weekdays during the day	Stops weekdays during the day
Stops late nights only	Stops late nights only
Stops rush hours only	Stops rush hours only
Stops rush hours in the peak direction only	Stops rush hours in the peak direction only

The Borough Hall/Court Street station is an underground New York City Subway station complex in Brooklyn shared by the BMT Fourth Avenue Line, the IRT Broadway–Seventh Avenue Line and the IRT Eastern Parkway Line. The complex comprises three stations: Borough Hall on the two IRT lines and Court Street on the BMT line. The stations are located under Court, Joralemon, and Montague Streets, next to Brooklyn Borough Hall, in the Downtown Brooklyn and Brooklyn Heights neighborhoods of Brooklyn. It is served by the 2, 4, and R trains at all times; the 3 train all times except late nights; the 5 train on weekdays; the N train during late nights; and limited rush-hour W trains.

The Borough Hall station of the Eastern Parkway Line was built for the Interborough Rapid Transit Company (IRT) as part of the city's first subway line. The station opened on January 9, 1908, when the original IRT was extended into Brooklyn. The Borough Hall station of the Broadway–Seventh Avenue Line opened on April 15, 1919, as part of the Dual Contracts. The Court Street station of the Fourth Avenue Line was built for the Brooklyn Rapid Transit Company (BRT; later the Brooklyn–Manhattan Transit Corporation, or BMT) as part of the Dual Contracts, and opened on August 1, 1920. Several modifications have been made to the IRT and BMT stations over the years, and they were connected within a single fare control area in 1948.

The Eastern Parkway Line station under Joralemon Street has two side platforms and two tracks on the same level. The Broadway–Seventh Avenue Line station under Brooklyn Borough Hall also has two side platforms and two tracks on different levels. The Fourth Avenue Line station has one island platform and two tracks. Part of the complex is compliant with the Americans with Disabilities Act of 1990. The original portion of the Eastern Parkway Line station's interior is a New York City designated landmark and listed on the National Register of Historic Places.

== History ==
=== First subway ===
Planning for a subway line in New York City dates to 1864. However, development of what would become the city's first subway line did not start until 1894, when the New York State Legislature passed the Rapid Transit Act. The subway plans were drawn up by a team of engineers led by William Barclay Parsons, the Rapid Transit Commission's chief engineer. The Rapid Transit Construction Company, organized by John B. McDonald and funded by August Belmont Jr., signed the initial Contract 1 with the Rapid Transit Commission in February 1900, in which it would construct the subway and maintain a 50-year operating lease from the opening of the line. In 1901, the firm of Heins & LaFarge was hired to design the underground stations. Belmont incorporated the Interborough Rapid Transit Company (IRT) in April 1902 to operate the subway.

Several days after Contract 1 was signed, the Board of Rapid Transit Railroad Commissioners instructed Parsons to evaluate the feasibility of extending the subway south to South Ferry, and then to Brooklyn. On January 24, 1901, the Board adopted a route that would extend the subway from City Hall to the Long Island Rail Road (LIRR)'s Flatbush Avenue terminal station (now known as Atlantic Terminal) in Brooklyn, via the Joralemon Street Tunnel under the East River. Contract 2, which gave the IRT a 35-year lease, was executed between the commission and the Rapid Transit Construction Company on September 11, 1902. Construction of the Contract 2 tunnel began at State Street in Manhattan on November 8, 1902. and work on the Joralemon Street Tunnel began in 1903. By July 1907, the Borough Hall station was nearly completed except for the entrances.

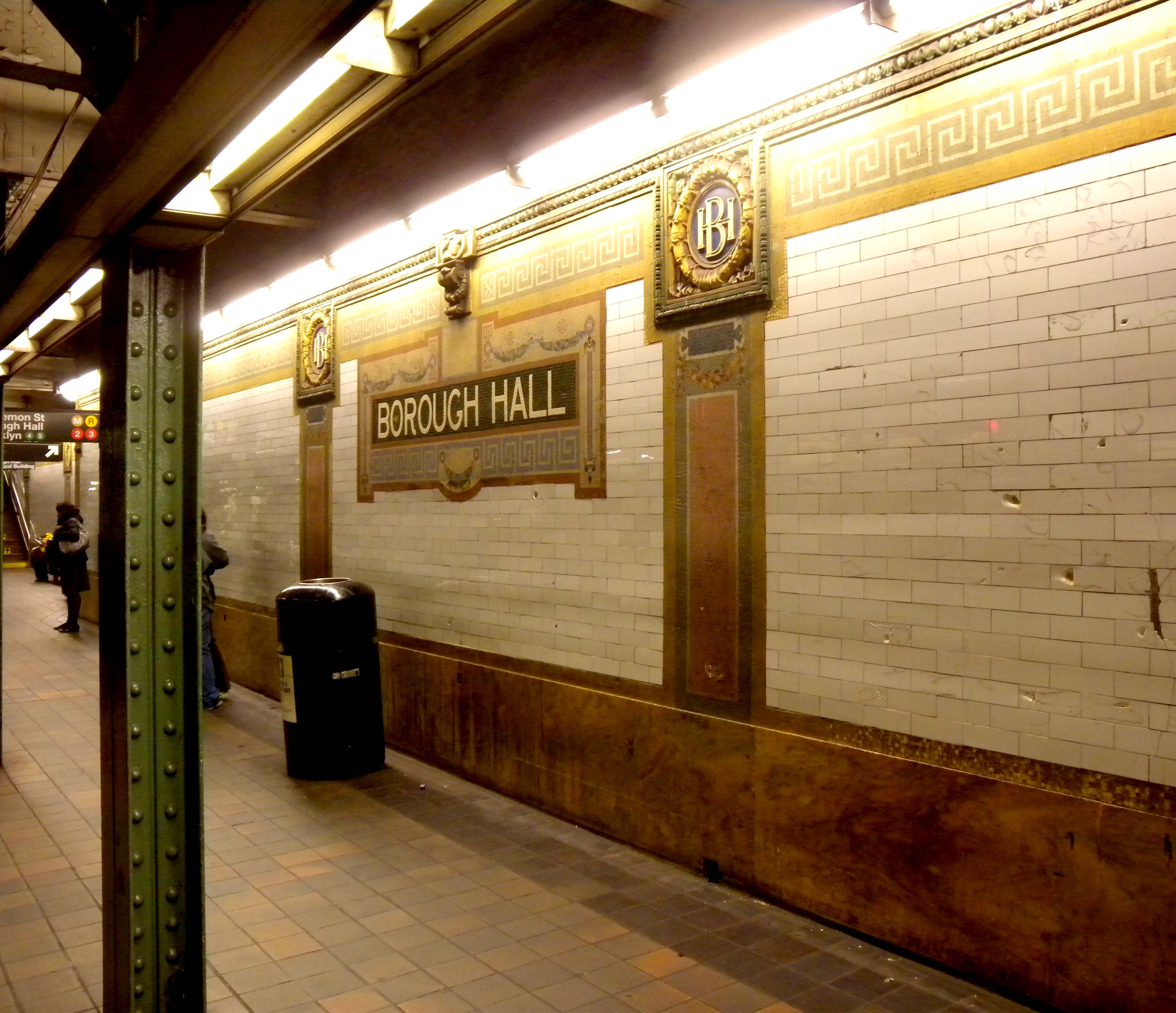
The Eastern Parkway Line station was the first of the complex's three stations to open.

The Borough Hall station opened on January 9, 1908, as the terminal for the extension of the IRT Lexington Avenue Line from Lower Manhattan. Borough Hall was the first underground subway station in Brooklyn; people waved flags throughout the borough to celebrate the station's opening, and officials celebrated the occasion with a parade and a banquet. Prior to the Borough Hall station's opening, the only rapid transit in Brooklyn had been the Brooklyn Rapid Transit Company (BRT)'s elevated lines, which operated only as far as the Manhattan ends of the Brooklyn Bridge. The opening of the station thus also alleviated congestion on lines that used the Brooklyn Bridge. A temporary switch was installed just west of the station, allowing trains to terminate on the southbound track until the line could be extended. An extension to Atlantic Avenue opened on May 1, 1908, completing the Contract 2 IRT line. Bronze bas-reliefs by William Ordway Partridge were installed at the Borough Hall station in early 1909 to denote the station's status as Brooklyn's first underground subway station.

To address overcrowding, in 1909, the New York Public Service Commission proposed lengthening the platforms at stations along the original IRT subway. As part of a modification to the IRT's construction contracts made on January 18, 1910, the company was to lengthen station platforms to accommodate ten-car express and six-car local trains. In addition to $1.5 million (equivalent to $51.8 million in 2025) spent on platform lengthening, $500,000 (equivalent to $17.3 million in 2025) was spent on building additional entrances and exits. It was anticipated that these improvements would increase capacity by 25 percent. The northbound platform at the Borough Hall station was extended 125 feet (38 m) to the east, while the southbound platform was extended 140 feet (43 m) to the east. During the construction of the platform extensions, the facade of Brooklyn Borough Hall began to crack because of vibrations from construction equipment. On January 23, 1911, ten-car express trains began running on the East Side Line, and the next day, ten-car express trains began running on the West Side Line.

=== Dual Contracts ===
After the original IRT opened, the city began planning new lines. One of these, the Centre Street Loop in Manhattan, was to connect the Brooklyn Bridge, Manhattan Bridge, and Williamsburg Bridge with a new tunnel under the East River. By 1910, the IRT's Borough Hall station was so crowded that residents of Brooklyn Heights, a residential neighborhood west of Borough Hall, wanted a stop to be added on the proposed Centre Street Loop within Brooklyn Heights. At the time, the line was supposed to have a station at Borough Hall, then slope downward under the East River. The Public Service Commission ultimately rejected a proposal for a Brooklyn Heights station because it would have required the tunnels to be built at an extremely steep slope of five percent.

==== IRT lines ====
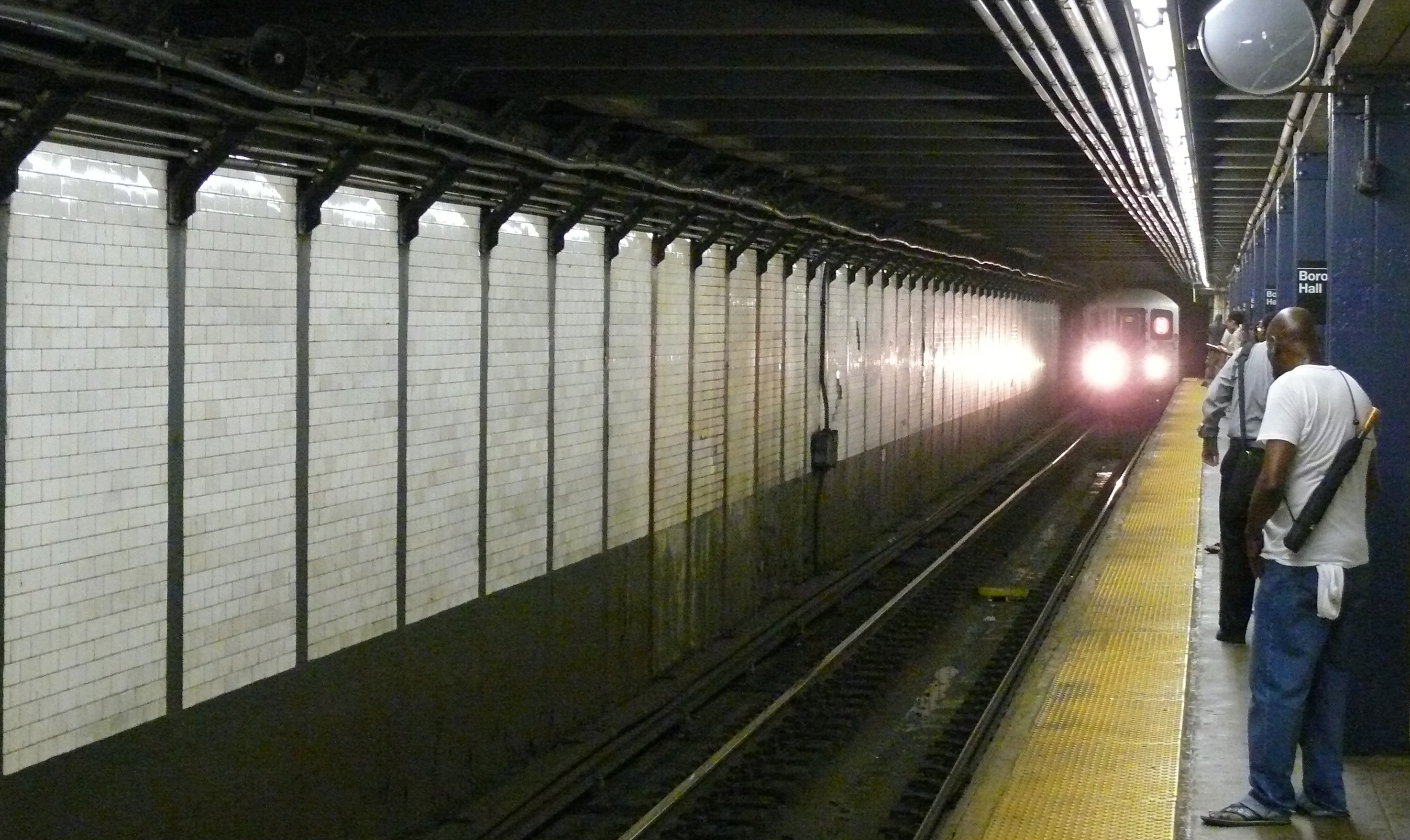
The Broadway–Seventh Avenue Line platforms opened in 1919.

As part of the Dual Contracts, approved in 1913, the New York City Public Service Commission planned to split the original IRT system into three segments: two north-south lines, carrying through trains over the Lexington Avenue and Broadway–Seventh Avenue Lines, and an east–west shuttle under 42nd Street. This would form a roughly H-shaped system. The Broadway–Seventh Avenue Line would split into two branches south of Chambers Street, one of which would turn eastward through Lower Manhattan, run under the East River via a new Clark Street Tunnel, and connect with the existing Contract 2 IRT Brooklyn Line at Borough Hall. The IRT was authorized to construct a station at Borough Hall. The line's Borough Hall station was a two-level station, with a connection to the existing Eastern Parkway Line station; the double-deck arrangement was required because the eastbound track had to pass under the existing line. To minimize disruption at street level, the line was excavated using cast-iron tunneling shields, typically used for underwater tunnels, rather than via the cut-and-cover method used elsewhere in the system. Entrances were planned along Fulton Street (now Cadman Plaza West (Note: Fulton Street formerly extended north from the intersection of Court Street and Montague Street. In 1959, the section north of Montague Street was renamed Cadman Plaza West.)) at Montague Street and at Myrtle Avenue.

Construction of the Clark Street Tunnel began in 1914, but the section of the line under Fulton Street was delayed by disputes over the demolition of part of the Fulton Street elevated line. By January 1919, the tracks for the Broadway–Seventh Avenue Line were completed, but signals and station finishes were still being installed. The IRT decided to push forward the tunnel's opening after learning that BRT workers might go on strike. On April 15, 1919, the Clark Street Tunnel opened, and the Broadway–Seventh Avenue Line's Borough Hall station opened with it, extending West Side Line express trains from Wall Street on the other side of the East River to Atlantic Avenue. The connection doubled the number of IRT trains that could travel between Manhattan and Brooklyn, and it eased congestion in the Joralemon Street Tunnel, the only other tunnel carrying IRT trains between the two boroughs. Direct express service to Times Square was provided to the inhabitants of Brooklyn for the first time as a result; trains through the Joralemon Street Tunnel made express stops in Manhattan, skipping Times Square.

In 1920, a new entrance at the northwestern corner of Joralemon Street and Court Street was completed. That year, the Eastern Parkway Line was extended east of Atlantic Avenue. The Joralemon Street Tunnel services, which had previously served all stops on the Eastern Parkway Line, became express services, while the Broadway–Seventh Avenue Line services ran local on the Eastern Parkway Line. Although the Eastern Parkway Line's express tracks already existed, they previously had been used only for storage. The tracks were reconfigured so that Eastern Parkway express trains could no longer stop at the Hoyt Street station, the next stop east.

==== BRT line ====
Also planned under the Dual Contracts was the Broadway Line and Fourth Avenue Line of the BRT (after 1923, the Brooklyn–Manhattan Transit Corporation or BMT). Under the Dual Contracts, the Whitehall–Montague Street route was to be built, connecting the Broadway Line in Manhattan and the Fourth Avenue subway under the Flatbush Avenue Extension to the west of the DeKalb Avenue station. The BRT was authorized to construct a station on the Whitehall–Montague Street route at the intersection of Montague and Court Streets. The Court Street station was to be built at the eastern end of the Montague Street Tunnel, a pair of tubes carrying the BRT line under the East River. Because of the station's depth, there would be elevators ascending to Clinton Street at its western end. The eastern end was to contain stairs and escalators leading directly to Court Street and to the IRT Broadway–Seventh Avenue Line station. A ramp extending west to Henry Street was also proposed but not built. This ramp was proposed as a compromise when the Public Service Commission had rejected plans for a second station in Brooklyn Heights.

Construction of the Montague Street Tunnel's two tubes began in 1914. The north tube of the tunnel was holed through on June 2, 1917, followed by the south tube on June 20, 1917. Service via the Montague Tunnel began on August 1, 1920, with the opening of the Court Street station. The Court Street station was one of three subway stations to open in Brooklyn Heights; the other two were Clark Street on the IRT Broadway–Seventh Avenue Line and High Street on the Independent Subway System (IND)'s Eighth Avenue Line. The BRT, along with the IRT and the city government, shared control of the Borough Hall/Court Street station.

=== Later modifications ===
==== 1920s to 1960s ====
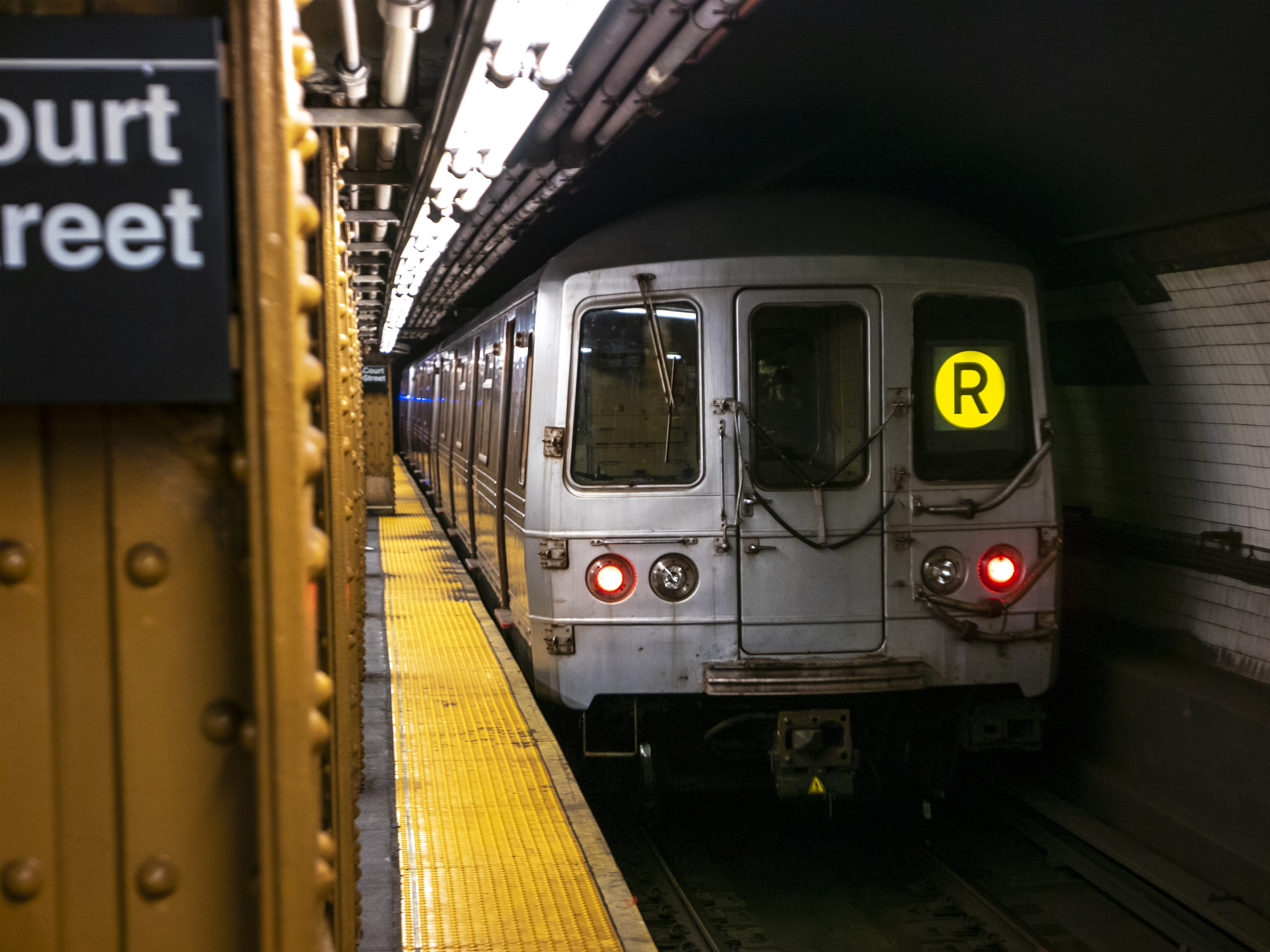
A northbound R train leaving the Court Street BMT station

In 1922, the New York State Transit Commission directed its engineers to prepare plans for lengthening the platforms at 23 stations on the BMT's lines to accommodate eight-car trains. As part of the project, platforms would be lengthened to 530 feet (160 m). Though the Transit Commission ordered the BMT to lengthen these platforms in September 1923, no further progress was made until February 16, 1925, when the New York City Board of Transportation (BOT) commissioned its engineers to examine platform-lengthening plans for Court Street and eleven other stations along the Fourth Avenue Line. It estimated the project would cost $633,000 (equivalent to $11,621,000 in 2025). The New York City Board of Estimate appropriated $362,841 for the lengthening of the platforms at Court Street and five other stations in January 1926 and awarded the contract to Charles Meads & Company early the next month. The platform extension at Court Street opened on August 1, 1927.

The city government took over the BMT's operations on June 1, 1940, and the IRT's operations on June 12, 1940. As part of a Works Progress Administration program, the IRT entrance at Cadman Plaza and Montague Street was integrated into a neighboring park in late 1940. The New York City Board of Transportation also renovated the station's bathrooms in 1947 as part of a larger initiative to upgrade bathrooms throughout the subway system. Transfer passageways between the three stations were placed inside fare control on July 1, 1948. During the Cold War, the city government proposed constructing a passageway between the IRT's Borough Hall station and the IND's Jay Street–Borough Hall station under Myrtle Avenue, which would have doubled as an air-raid shelter. The passageway and other shelters in the New York City Subway system would have cost $15 million; the federal government would have paid half, and the city and state government would have paid the other half.

The Board of Transportation announced plans in November 1949 to extend platforms at several IRT stations, including the Eastern Parkway/Lexington Avenue Line platforms at Borough Hall, to accommodate all doors on ten-car trains. Although ten-car trains already operated on the line, the rear car could not open its doors at the station due to the short platforms. Funding for the platform extensions was included in the city's 1950 capital budget. During the 1964–1965 fiscal year, the IRT platforms at Borough Hall were lengthened to 525 feet (160 m) to accommodate a ten-car train of 51-foot (16 m) IRT cars. The work was undertaken by the Arthur A. Johnson Corporation. In the late 1960s, New York City Transit extended the Fourth Avenue Line platform about 85 feet (26 m) to the west, allowing it to accommodate ten 60-foot (18 m) cars.

==== 1970s to 1990s ====
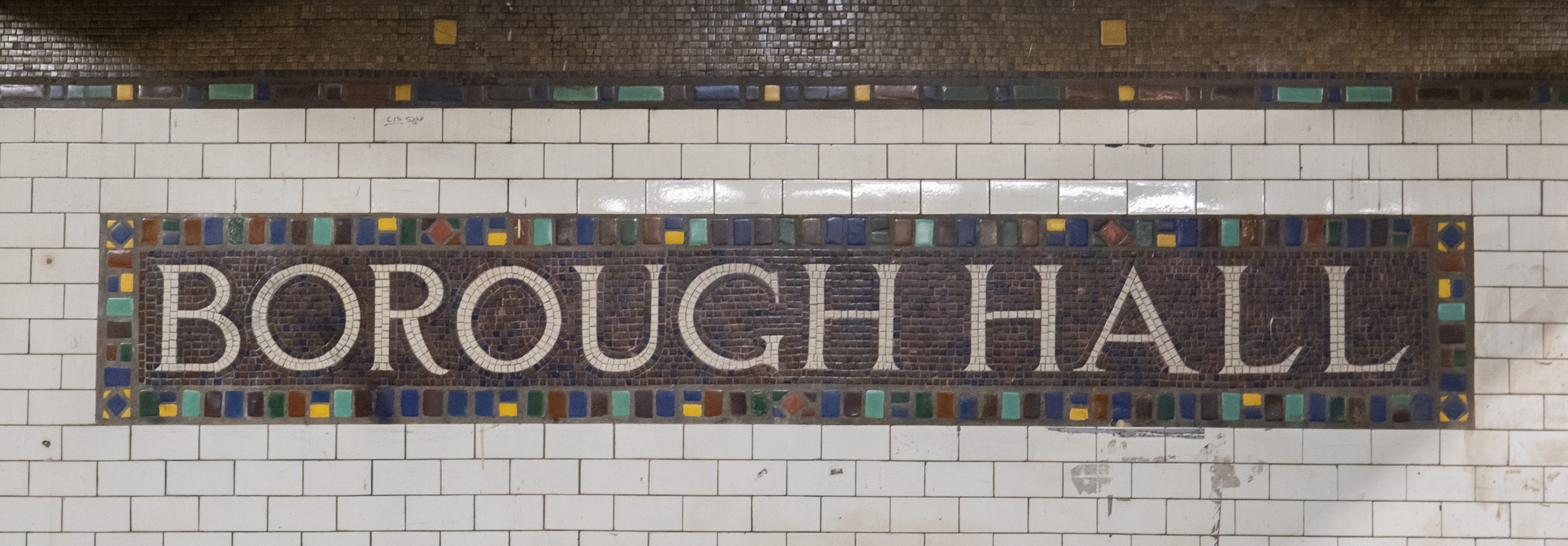
Mosaic name tablet

The Metropolitan Transportation Authority (MTA) had proposed renovating the Borough Hall station as early as its 1975–1979 capital plan. In 1976, with funding from the Exxon Corporation, the Broadway–Seventh Avenue Line station, as well as three others citywide, received new "artfully humorous graffiti" murals and artwork. Local designer Samuel Lebowitz received $5,000 to "improve the level of lighting in an exciting and light hearted way." Some "multicolored animated neon signs" were placed underneath transparent plastic screens; such signs included "an abstract eye that winks every five seconds" and another that looked to be "blow[ing] smoke rings." The agency closed one of the station's token booths in 1977 to save money, although the booth was reopened shortly afterward. In 1979, the New York City Landmarks Preservation Commission designated the space within the boundaries of the original Eastern Parkway Line station, excluding expansions made after 1904, as a city landmark. The station was designated along with eleven others on the original IRT.

In 1981, the Metropolitan Transportation Authority (MTA) listed the Borough Hall/Court Street station complex among the 69 most deteriorated stations in the subway system. A renovation of the Eastern Parkway Line station took place in the early 1980s as part of the MTA's Adopt-a-Station program. MTA chairman Richard Ravitch announced in October 1981 that these platforms would be renovated with funding from the Subway Committee for the Brooklyn Downtown Commercial Crescent, a local civic group. The Brooklyn Union Gas Company raised $25,000, while other businesses raised another $25,000; the Urban Mass Transportation Administration (UMTA) provided a matching grant of $50,000. The MTA also provided $3.5 million for the project as part of its 1980–1984 capital program. In 1982, the UMTA gave a $66 million grant to the New York City Transit Authority, part of which was allocated for the renovation of several subway stations, including Borough Hall's IRT platforms.

Work on the project had begun by 1983 but had fallen behind schedule two years later. One of the issues was that the MTA had wanted to save the original tiles in the Eastern Parkway Line station, a designated New York City landmark, but the agency could not get the tiles to stick to the wall. New tiles had to be imported from Czechoslovakia, and some tiles were stolen before they could be installed. Some newly-renovated parts of the station were already deteriorating by 1987, such as tiled floors that had come loose. Other parts of the renovation had been conducted haphazardly, such as the uneven installation of gray wall tiles, as well as a ceiling that had been repainted above the platforms but not the tracks. At that point, it had taken nearly as long to renovate the station as to construct the original line. The New York City Transit Authority eventually filed a lawsuit to compel the renovation contractor to complete the project. The rest of the complex was also slated to be renovated, but the improvements were temporarily delayed in 1987 because of the poor quality of the Eastern Parkway Line station's renovation. MTA officials diverted funding for the other platforms' renovations in December 1989 to cover a budget shortfall.

In the early 1990s, the BMT station's columns were repainted "Newport green" to match the mosaic tiles as part of a systemwide repainting program. Workers were installing elevators at the Borough Hall IRT stations by 1992, as part of the MTA's plan to make dozens of "key stations" accessible to passengers with disabilities. The work was finished by the next year. Most of the IRT portion of the complex became wheelchair-accessible, except for the eastbound Eastern Parkway Line platform. The subway entrance at Clinton Street was converted into a part-time entrance in 1994, after the removal of high entry-exit turnstiles at the entrance. The escalators to the BMT station were replaced in 1997; the repair project was delayed by two months after several dozen escalator steps were stolen. Even after the repairs were completed, the escalators continued to experience periodic outages.

==== 2000s to present ====
The original Eastern Parkway Line station's interiors were listed on the National Register of Historic Places in 2004. In June 2018, part of the Eastern Parkway Line station's ceiling collapsed, injuring a passenger. The collapse of the 100-year-old ceiling necessitated $8.3 million in emergency repairs. Prior to the ceiling collapse, neither the MTA nor the New York City Department of Transportation had identified the Borough Hall station as a "priority" station requiring renovation. An internal report, released in late 2019, found that the staff sent to inspect the station verified the defect existed in 2017, but underestimated its severity due to a lack of expertise in terracotta ceilings, nor was the issue escalated to engineers who were familiar with terracotta. The MTA report suggested that special care be taken in the inspection of the thirteen subway stations that have terracotta ceilings due to the different properties when compared to concrete or steel.

The IRT station's existing elevators were closed for replacement for several months starting in July 2020. The two elevators at the western end of the BMT's Court Street station were also replaced starting in 2022, requiring the closure of the exit at Clinton Street; this was part of a program to replace elevators across the subway system. The BMT elevators at Clinton Street reopened in June 2023. The BMT platform also received structural and visual upgrades, which were completed in January 2024. In November 2022, the MTA announced that it would award a $106 million contract for the installation of additional elevators at the Borough Hall station complex. The project would make the Eastern Parkway Line platforms fully accessible. The contract included one elevator from the mezzanine to each of the Eastern Parkway Line platforms, as well as one elevator from the mezzanine to the street. As of March 2023, work was scheduled to begin in the middle of that year and be completed in 2025; the elevators ultimately opened in December 2025. New York City councilmember Lincoln Restler founded a volunteer group, the Friends of MTA Station Group, in early 2023 to advocate for improvements to the Borough Hall station and four other subway stations in Brooklyn.

=== Service history ===
==== IRT stations ====
Initially, the Eastern Parkway Line station was served by express trains along both the West Side (now the Broadway–Seventh Avenue Line to Van Cortlandt Park–242nd Street) and East Side (now the Lenox Avenue Line). The express trains, running to Atlantic Avenue, had their northern terminus at 242nd Street or West Farms (180th Street). Lenox local trains to 145th Street served the station during late nights. The Lexington Avenue Line north of Grand Central–42nd Street opened on August 1, 1918, and all Eastern Parkway Line services were sent via the Lexington Avenue Line. The Broadway–Seventh Avenue Line's Brooklyn branch carried the express services to 242nd Street or via the Lenox Avenue Line when the Clark Street Tunnel opened in 1919 (express service to 242nd Street was eliminated in 1959). To the south, trains ran to Flatbush Avenue or Utica Avenue starting in 1920 and to New Lots Avenue starting in 1924.

The IRT routes were given numbered designations in 1948 with the introduction of "R-type" rolling stock, which contained rollsigns with numbered designations for each service. The 2, 3, 4, and 5 trains were given their present designations at that time. The Broadway–Seventh Avenue Line services became the 2 and 3, and the Lexington Avenue/Eastern Parkway Line services became the 4 and 5.

==== BMT station ====
The Court Street BMT station opened when the Montague Street Tunnel opened on August 1, 1920, Broadway Line trains to Brooklyn could either use the tunnel, stopping at Court Street and five other stations in Lower Manhattan and Downtown Brooklyn, or use the Manhattan Bridge, which skipped all of these stations. Initially, Court Street was served by Fourth Avenue Line local trains (labeled as the BMT 2), Brighton Beach Line express trains (the BMT 1), and some rush-hour West End Line trains (the BMT 3). Brighton express trains were later rerouted to the Manhattan Bridge, while Brighton locals started using the tunnel. After the BMT Nassau Street Line was completed in 1931, West End trains via the Montague Street Tunnel started using the Nassau Street Line instead of the Broadway Line in Manhattan.

The opening of the Chrystie Street Connection in 1967 resulted in drastic changes to the services that stopped at the Court Street station. The RR (later the R) and the QJ began using the Montague Street Tunnel, running via Court Street; the QJ was replaced by the M in 1973. After the Manhattan Bridge was closed for repairs in 1986, all off-peak N trains began running through the Montague Street Tunnel and serving Court Street. Starting in December 1988, N and R trains ran through the tunnel and the Whitehall Street station at all times. When the Manhattan Bridge reopened in February 2004, the R train began serving the station at all times except late nights, while the N train only served the station at night. The M train stopped serving the station when it was rerouted to Midtown Manhattan in 2010. When the Montague Street Tunnel closed for repairs in August 2013, weekday R service was divided into two segments; the Court Street station was the northern terminus of the Brooklyn segment. The R train did not serve the station on weekends, and the N train did not stop there at all, until regular service resumed in September 2014.

== Station layout ==
Metrically accurate station map showing tracks, platforms, mezzanines, stairs, elevators, escalators, exits, ticket machines, gates, benches, and trashcans.

The complex is composed of three stations that are all connected within a single fare control area. The IRT Eastern Parkway Line station has two tracks and two side platforms and runs east–west under Joralemon Street. The IRT Broadway–Seventh Avenue Line station has two tracks and two side platforms that are stacked above each other, and it runs roughly northwest to southeast under Cadman Plaza and Borough Hall. The BMT Fourth Avenue Line station has two tracks and one island platform running east–west under Montague Street. The Broadway–Seventh Avenue Line platforms and Eastern Parkway Line platforms are fully accessible under the Americans with Disabilities Act of 1990 (ADA), with an ADA-accessible passageway connecting the northbound Eastern Parkway Line platform the northbound Broadway–Seventh Avenue Line platform. However, the Fourth Avenue Line platform is not ADA-accessible.

At the mezzanine level are three overpasses above the center of the Eastern Parkway Line platforms. The outer two overpasses have two fare control areas, one each on the north and south sides. The middle overpass is a passageway connecting the unpaid areas on the north and south sides, and has no access to the platforms. The central mezzanine has two bronze plaques commemorating the subway's arrival in Brooklyn: a plaque to the PSC on the west and a plaque celebrating the station's opening on the east. These plaques, measuring 6 by 2 feet (1.83 by 0.61 m), were designed by Partridge and originally placed on the southbound platform. The plaques are installed within mosaic tablets with swag and floral designs. A fourth overpass is at the extreme west end of the Eastern Parkway Line platforms. The eastern end of the northbound Eastern Parkway Line platform has a passageway leading to the southern end of the northbound Broadway–Seventh Avenue Line platform. This passageway is decorated with a mosaic mural by Ruby Onyinyechi Amanze, May Your Road Be Light and Fun. This artwork covers 110 feet (34 m) of the wall's length and includes motifs from Amanze's other artwork, such as an alien and a leopard–human hybrid.

At the northern end of the Broadway–Seventh Avenue Line station is another mezzanine above the upper platform level, leading to exits on Court Street as well as to the Fourth Avenue Line platform. An escalator leads from the lower platform level to the mezzanine. The unpaid areas are on the southeastern side of this mezzanine.

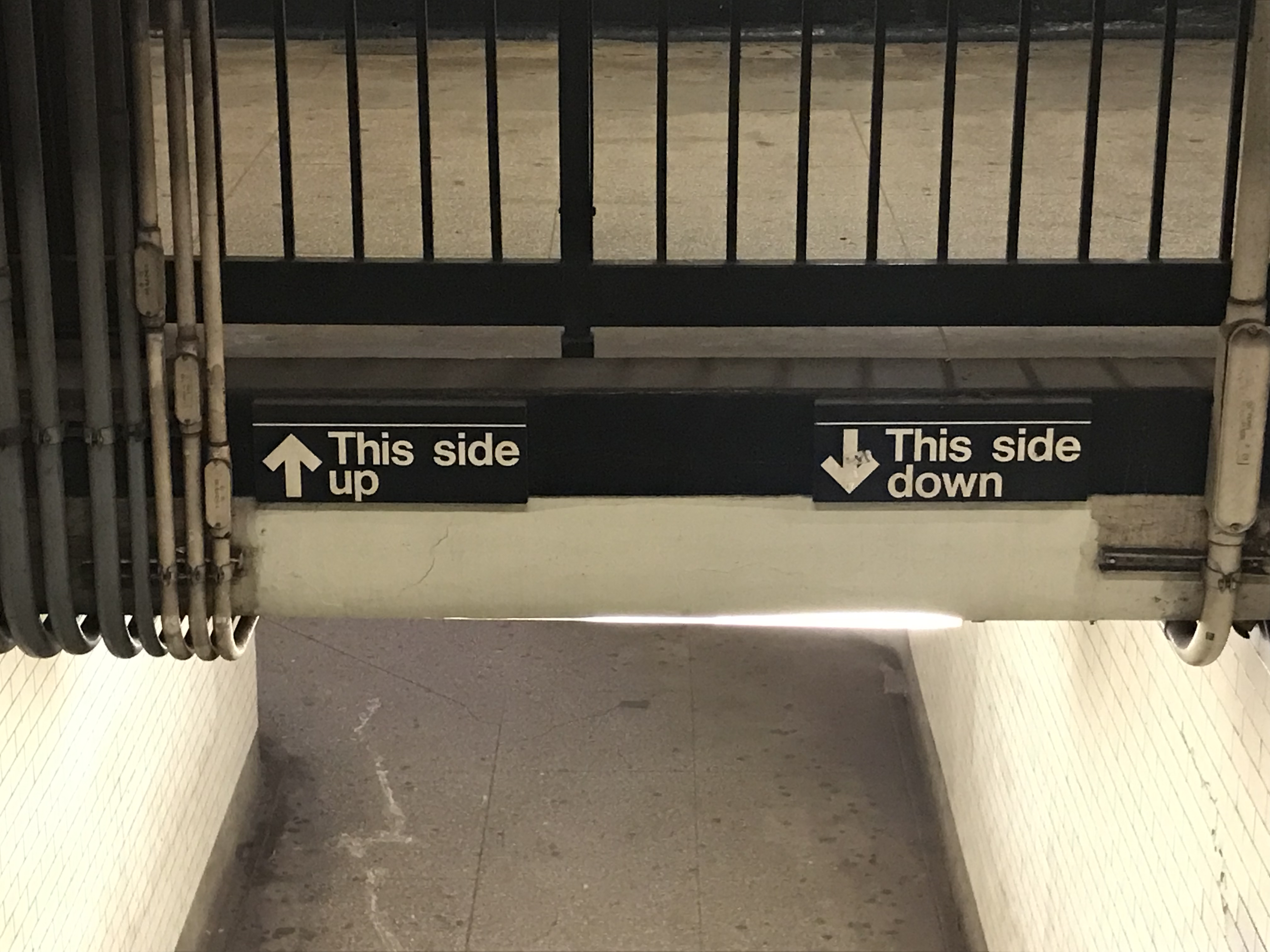
Staircases throughout the station have signs instructing passengers to keep to one side when going up or down.

The Fourth Avenue Line platform is the deepest in the complex, under both sets of IRT platforms. Two stairs rise from the eastern end of the Fourth Avenue Line station to an intermediate mezzanine, where escalators and stairs lead to a mezzanine above the Broadway–Seventh Avenue Line platforms. There is another exit at the extreme western end. A stair rises to a landing above the platform, where two elevators go up to the western BMT mezzanine. The mezzanine has a part-time turnstile bank and customer assistance booth. Full height turnstiles provide entrance/exit from the mezzanine at all times.

=== Exits ===
The main fare control for the IRT Broadway–Seventh Avenue Line and BMT Fourth Avenue Line platforms is at the west end of the platforms. Outside fare control, two staircases ascend to the southeast corner of Court and Montague Streets, and a staircase and elevator ascend to Columbus Park, the entrance plaza of Brooklyn Borough Hall, on the east side of Court Street. The design of the elevator resembles that of the ornate entrance kiosks in the original IRT subway. These entrances also serve the U.S. Bankruptcy Court within the Federal Building and Post Office to the north, as well as a New York Supreme Court courthouse to the east. Historically, there was also an exit to a bank on the northern side of Montague Street.

The main fare control for the IRT Eastern Parkway Line platforms is at the center of the station and is staffed. On the northbound side, the overpasses have full height turnstiles leading to two staircases, one each flanking Brooklyn Borough Hall's main entrance on the northeast corner of Court and Joralemon Streets. The stairs flanking Borough Hall retain cast-iron hoods atop granite bases, which are part of the original design. The Borough Hall station is one of two stations to retain such hoods, the other being the Wall Street station in Manhattan. On the southbound side, the overpasses have small turnstile banks, leading to a token booth and two staircases, going up to the southeast corner of Court and Joralemon Streets. The banisters on these staircases are made of concrete since they are outside the Brooklyn Municipal Building. The mezzanine has a large set of doors leading into the Municipal Building (this entrance was closed in February 1996 due to security concerns), and a now-defunct bank teller window. On the northwest corner of the mezzanine, a passage led to Borough Hall.

The secondary fare control area for the IRT Eastern Parkway Line is at the extreme west end and is unstaffed. Outside fare control, there is a token booth. Past the booth, one stair each goes up to the northwest and southwest corners of Court and Joralemon Streets. Prior to 1961, there were two additional entrances to the southwest corner of the intersection. These entrances are within one block of the Generoso Pope Athletic Complex of St. Francis College.

The unstaffed fare control area for the BMT Fourth Avenue Line leads from the extreme west end of that platform. Outside fare control, one stair each goes to the northwest and southwest corners of Montague and Clinton Streets. The northwest staircase has an antique "SUBWAY" white and green globe sign since it is in the front yard of St. Ann's and Holy Trinity Church (the mezzanine has a mosaic sign with the church's name on it). The southwest staircase is next to the basement entrance of a daycare. The First Unitarian Church of Brooklyn, Brooklyn Historical Society, Brooklyn Trust Company Building, and Saint Ann's School are located within one block of these entrances.

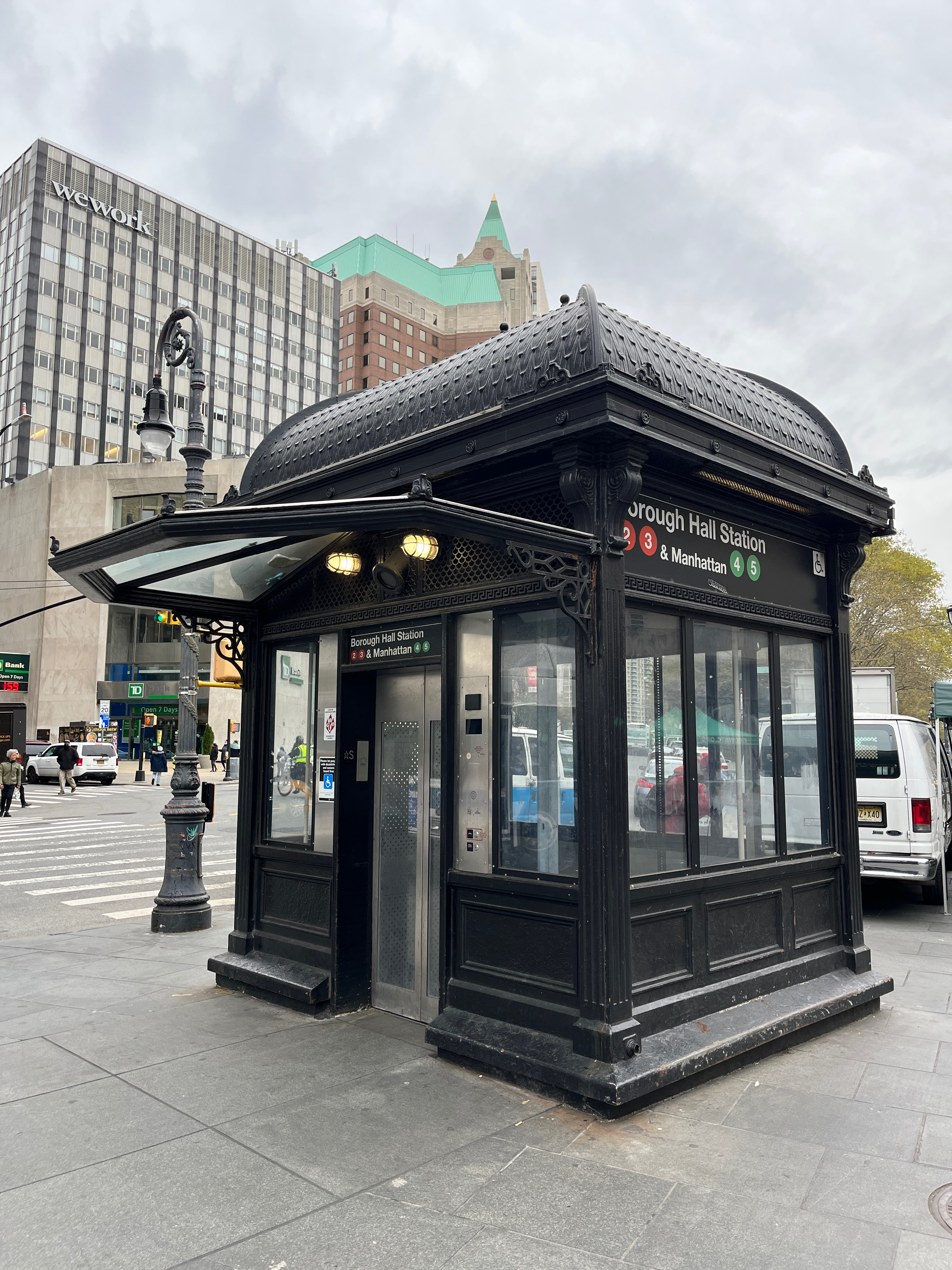
Elevator kiosk, serving the IRT Broadway–Seventh Avenue Line and the northbound platform of the IRT Eastern Parkway Line.

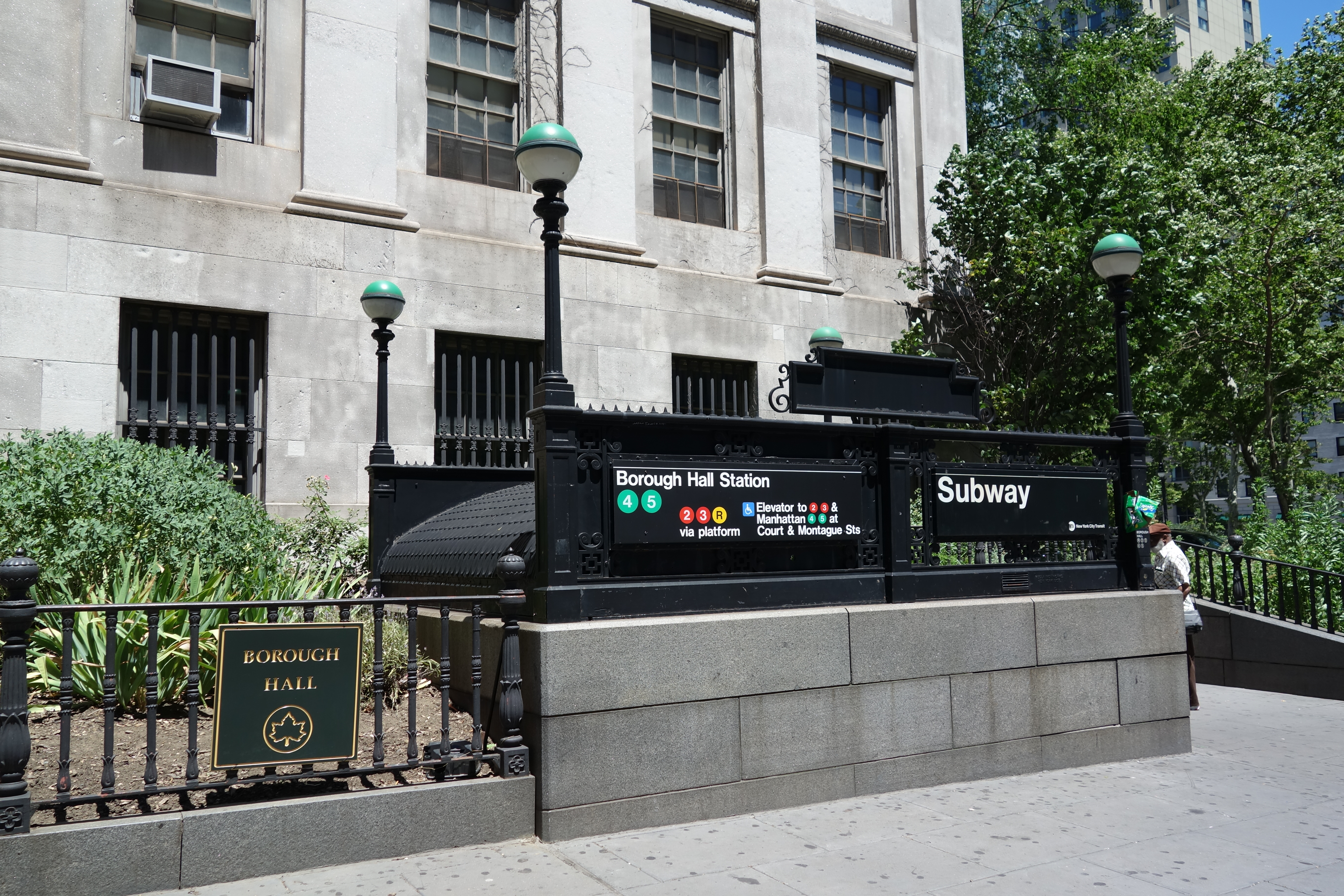
Entrance in front of Brooklyn Borough Hall

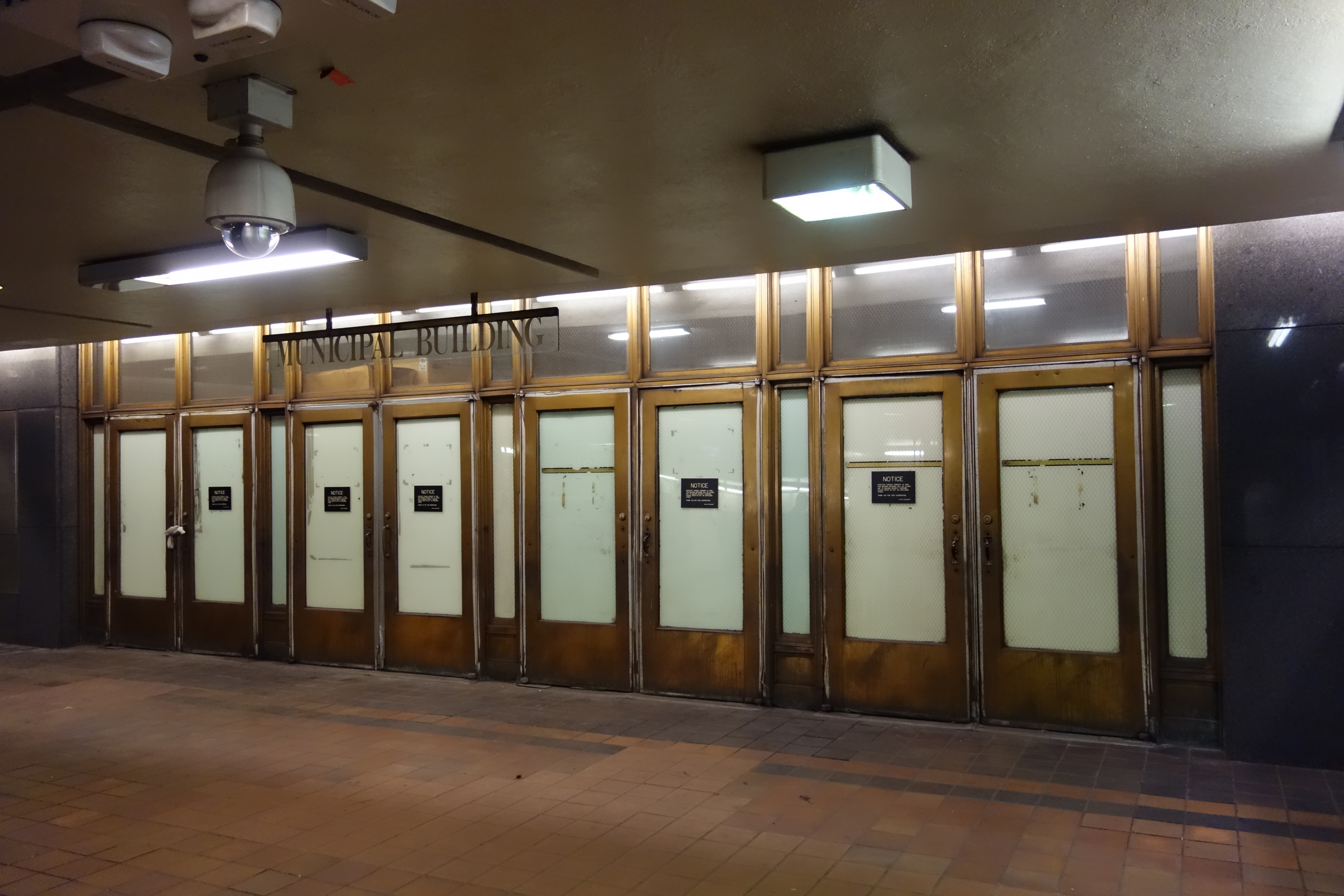
Former entrance to the Brooklyn Municipal Building

== IRT Broadway–Seventh Avenue Line platforms ==
Borough Hall
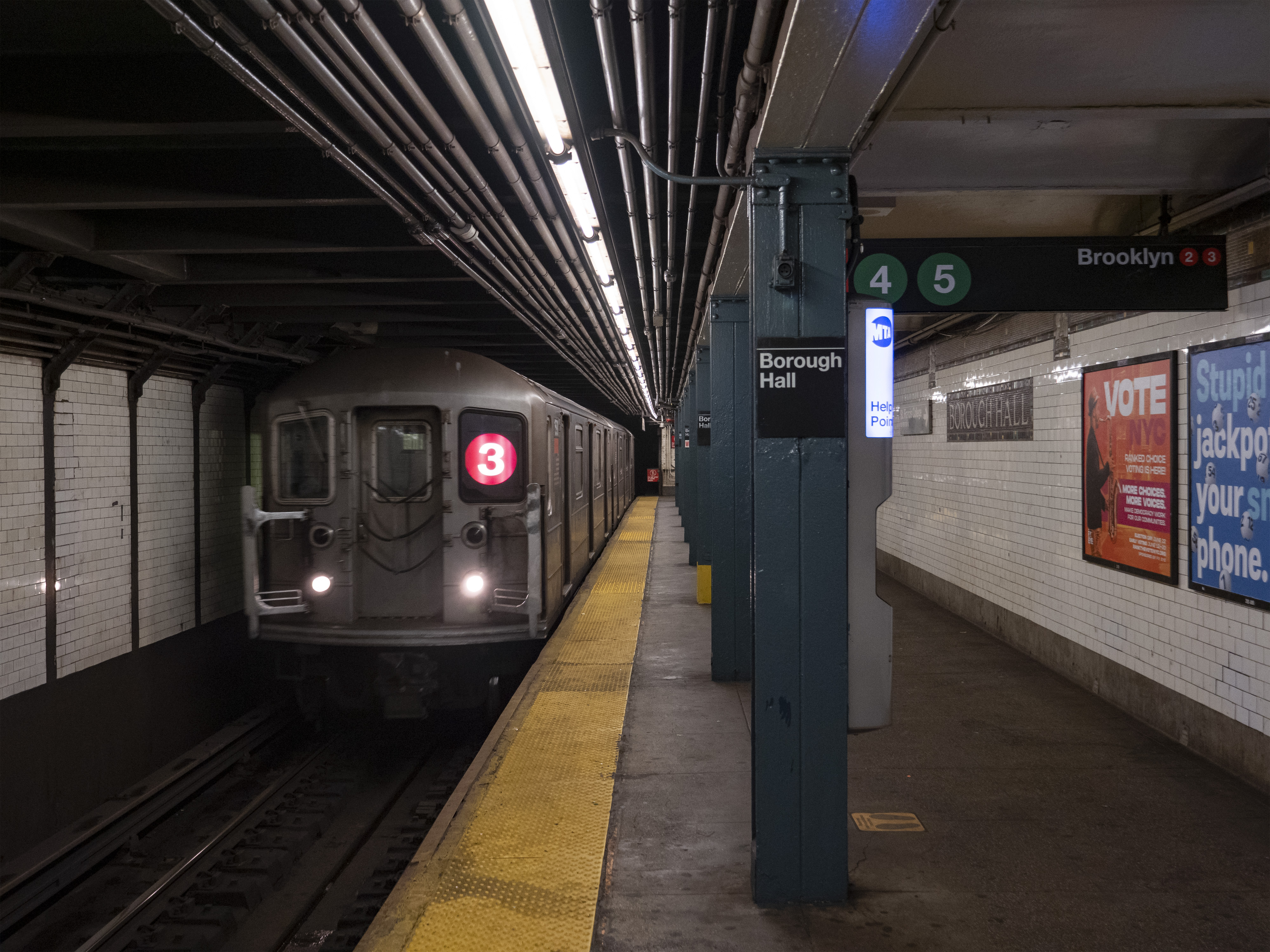
- Northbound R62 3 train arriving

Station statistics
- Division: A (IRT)
- Line: IRT Broadway–Seventh Avenue Line
- Services: 2 (all times); 3 (all except late nights)
- Structure: Underground
- Levels: 2
- Platforms: 2 split side platforms (1 on each level)
- Tracks: 2 (1 on each level)

Other information
- Opened: April 15, 1919; 107 years ago
- Accessible: Yes
Services
Preceding station	New York City Subway	Following station
Clark Street 2 3 via 135th Street	2 (New York City Subway service) 3 (New York City Subway service)	Hoyt Street 2 3 via Franklin Avenue–Medgar Evers College
Track layout
Station service legend
Symbol	Description
Stops all times except late nights	Stops all times except late nights
Stops all times	Stops all times
Stops weekdays during the day	Stops weekdays during the day
Stops weekdays and weekday late nights	Stops weekdays and weekday late nights

The Borough Hall station on the IRT Broadway–Seventh Avenue Line is a double-level station with two tracks in a split platform configuration. Southwest of each track is a side platform; northbound trains use the upper level while southbound trains use the lower one. The 2 train stops here at all times, while the 3 train stops here at all times except late nights. On both routes, the Borough Hall station is located between the Clark Street station to the north and the Hoyt Street station to the south.

At the eastern end of both platforms, a staircase from the lower level goes up to the upper level, near the passageway to the northbound IRT Eastern Parkway Line platform. At the western end of both platforms, a staircase from the lower level goes up to the upper level before another staircase goes up to a mezzanine. The lower level also has an up-only escalator that bypasses the upper level, leading directly to the mezzanine. An elevator connects both platforms to the upper mezzanine.

East of the platforms, the southbound Broadway–Seventh Avenue Line track crosses diagonally about 18 feet (5.5 m) below both of the Eastern Parkway tracks, then curves eastward and slopes up to the level of the Eastern Parkway Line near Smith Street. Both become the local tracks for the line. The Broadway–Seventh Avenue Line's connection to the Eastern Parkway Line was built as part of the original subway line but was not used until the opening of the Clark Street Tunnel. The local tracks of the line were originally planned to travel north under what is now Cadman Plaza West to the Brooklyn Bridge.

Both platforms have their original IRT trim line and name tablets reading "BOROUGH HALL" in a serif lettering style. Tablets showing images of Borough Hall are located at regular intervals on the trim line. Dark blue I-beam columns line both platforms at regular intervals with alternating ones having the standard black station name plate in white lettering.

== IRT Eastern Parkway Line platforms ==
Borough Hall
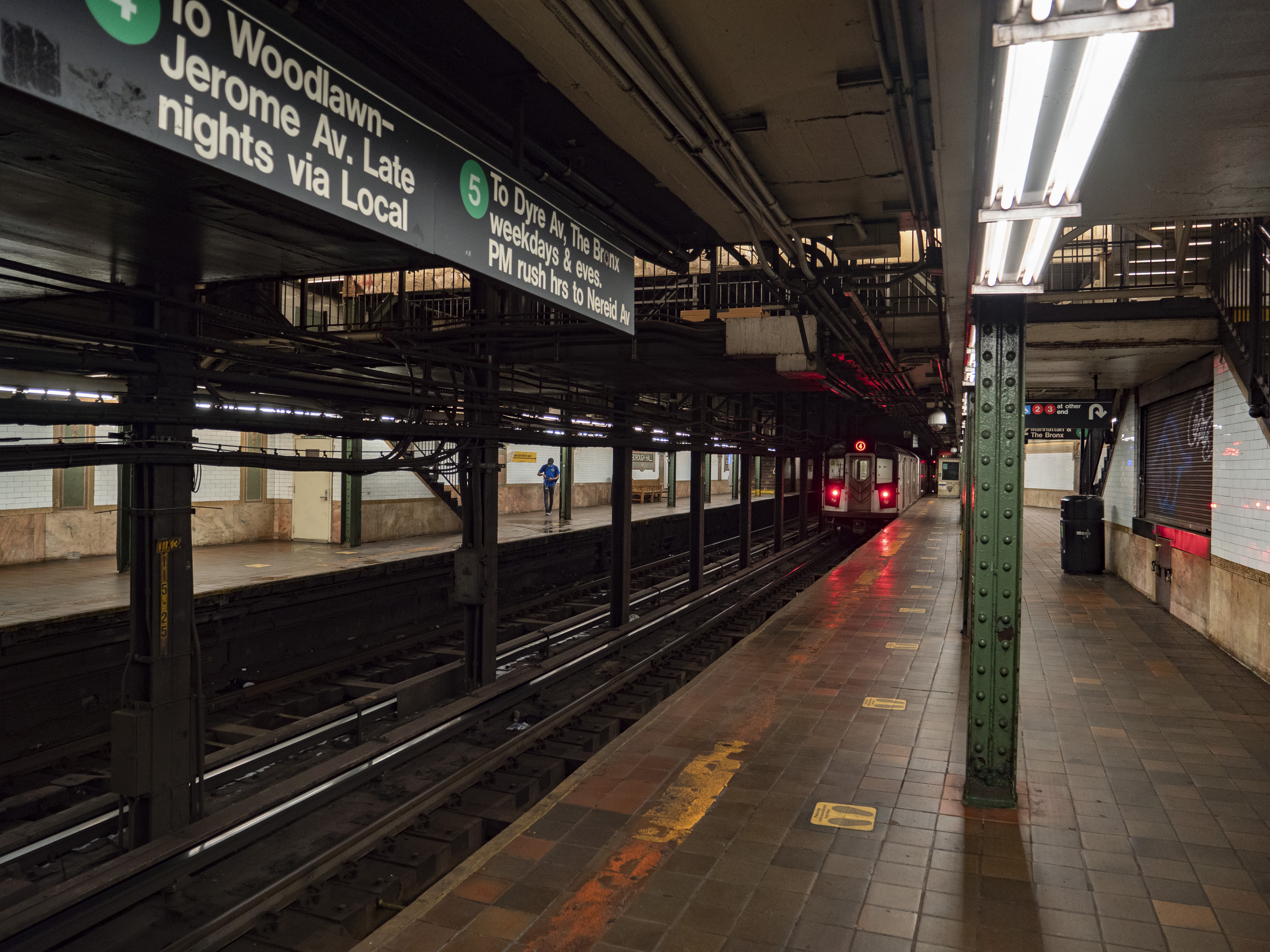
- Northbound R142A 4 train leaving the station

Station statistics
- Division: A (IRT)
- Line: IRT Eastern Parkway Line
- Services: 4 (all times); 5 (weekdays only)
- Structure: Underground
- Platforms: 2 side platforms
- Tracks: 2

Other information
- Opened: January 9, 1908; 118 years ago
- Accessible: Yes
Services
Preceding station	New York City Subway	Following station
Bowling Green 4 5 via 138th Street–Grand Concourse	Express	Nevins Street 4 5 via Franklin Avenue–Medgar Evers College
Track layout
Station service legend
Symbol	Description
Stops all times except late nights	Stops all times except late nights
Stops all times	Stops all times
Stops weekdays during the day	Stops weekdays during the day
- Borough Hall Subway Station (IRT)
- U.S. National Register of Historic Places
- New York State Register of Historic Places
- New York City Landmark
- MPS: New York City Subway System MPS
- NRHP reference No.: 04001022
- NYSRHP No.: 04701.015554
- NYCL No.: 1096

Significant dates
- Added to NRHP: September 17, 2004
- Designated NYSRHP: July 20, 2004
- Designated NYCL: October 23, 1979

The Borough Hall station on the IRT Eastern Parkway Line is an express station, and has two tracks and two side platforms on the same level. The 4 train stops here at all times, while the 5 train stops here on weekdays during the day. On both routes, the Borough Hall station is located between the Bowling Green station to the north and the Nevins Street station to the south.

The platforms were originally 350 feet (110 m) long, like at other Contract 2 stations, but were lengthened to 520 feet (160 m) by 1964. Two staircases from each platform lead to each of the two overpasses at the center of the station, while one staircase from each platform leads to the overpass at the extreme west end. The eastern end of the northbound platform connects with the passageway leading from the northbound Broadway-Seventh Avenue Line platform. The original portion of the station is a New York City designated landmark and is listed on the National Register of Historic Places.

East of this station, the two tracks become the express tracks of the IRT Eastern Parkway Line; the line's local tracks are connected to the two tracks of the IRT Broadway–Seventh Avenue Line. Originally, a set of switches between Borough Hall and Hoyt Street connected the express tracks to the local tracks. The roof of the tunnel above the switches was supported by girders weighing 18 short tons (16 long tons; 16 t) and measuring 52 feet (16 m) wide. The switches have since been removed.

=== Design ===
As with other stations built as part of the original IRT, the station was constructed using a cut-and-cover method. The tunnel is covered by a U-shaped trough that contains utility pipes and wires. This trough contains a foundation of concrete no less than 4 inches (100 mm) thick. Each platform consists of 3-inch-thick (7.6 cm) concrete slabs, beneath which are drainage basins. The platforms contain green I-beam columns, spaced every 15 feet (4.6 m). Additional columns between the tracks, spaced every 5 feet (1.5 m), support the jack-arched concrete station roofs. The ceiling height varies based on whether there are utilities in the ceiling. There is a 1-inch (25 mm) gap between the trough wall and the platform walls, which are made of 4-inch (100 mm)-thick brick covered over by a tiled finish.

The walls along the platforms consist of a pink marble wainscoting on the lowest part of the wall, with bronze air vents along the wainscoting, and white glass tiles above. The platform walls are divided at 15-foot (4.6 m) intervals by green and rose pilasters, or vertical bands, with brown and buff-colored swags. In the original portion of the station, each pilaster is topped by blue, green, and yellow faience plaques with the letters "BH". White-on-green tile plaques with the words "Borough Hall", containing red, green, blue, buff, violet, and pink mosaic borders, are also placed on the walls. The platform extensions contain similar decorative elements. The ceilings contain plaster molding. At the extreme east end of the platforms, where the platforms were extended, the walls have a brown trim line on beige tiles with "BOROUGH HALL" in white sans serif lettering.

== BMT Fourth Avenue Line platform ==
Court Street
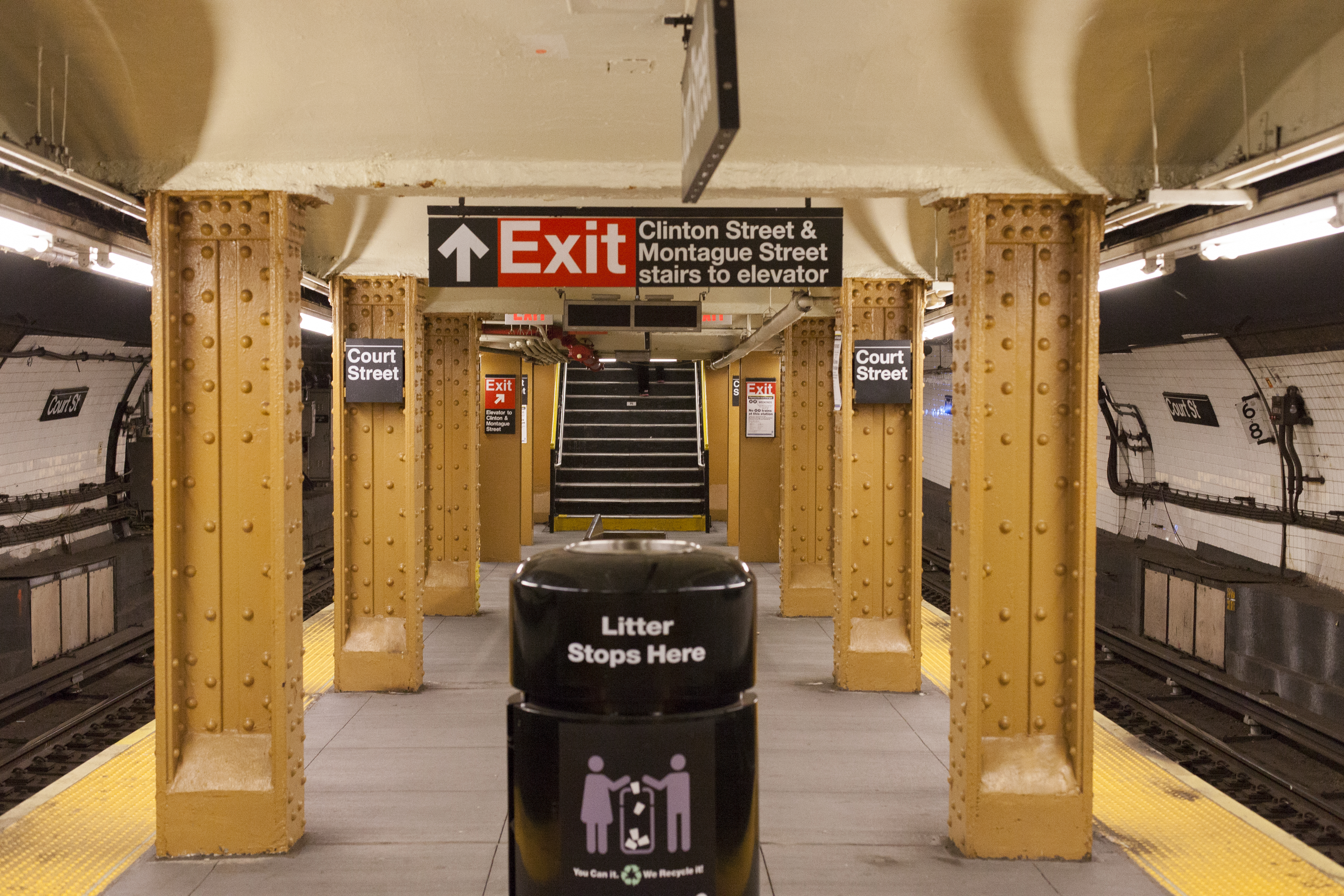
- Platform view

Station statistics
- Division: B (BMT)
- Line: BMT Fourth Avenue Line
- Services: N (late nights); R (all times); W (limited rush hour service only)
- Structure: Underground
- Platforms: 1 island platform
- Tracks: 2

Other information
- Opened: August 1, 1920; 106 years ago
- Accessible: Partially; access to mezzanine only, platforms not accessible
Services
Preceding station	New York City Subway	Following station
Whitehall Street–South Ferry N R W toward Forest Hills–71st Avenue	Local	Jay Street–MetroTech N R W toward Bay Ridge–95th Street
Non-revenue services and lines
Preceding station	New York City Subway	Following station
Broad Street Nassau St	no service	
Track layout
Station service legend
Symbol	Description
Stops all times	Stops all times
Stops late nights only	Stops late nights only
Stops rush hours only	Stops rush hours only
Stops rush hours in the peak direction only	Stops rush hours in the peak direction only

The Court Street station on the BMT Fourth Avenue Line is a local station, and has two tracks and one island platform. R trains serve the station at all times; some rush-hour W trains stop here; and N train stops here during late nights. The next station to the north is Whitehall Street in Manhattan, while the next station to the south is Jay Street–MetroTech.

A single staircase from the western end of the platform goes up to the elevators to the western BMT mezzanine. Two staircases from the eastern end of the platform go up to the escalators and stairs to the IRT passageway.

West of the station, the line goes through the Montague Street Tunnel under the East River to connect to the BMT Broadway Line and the BMT Nassau Street Line. All trains use the Broadway Line connection, which goes to Whitehall Street. The latter connection, to the Broad Street station, was last used by the M train in June 2010 before it was rerouted.

Since the tunnel descends to go underneath the East River, it was constructed with a deep-bore tunnel, making both track walls curved. The walls also still have their original Dual Contracts mosaic tablets and trim line. The name tablets have "COURT ST." in serif lettering, and tablets showing scenes of Borough Hall are located along the trim line at regular intervals. The western end (railroad north) of the walls is plain white. Yellow I-beam columns line both sides of the island platform at regular intervals with alternating ones having the standard black station name plate in white lettering.

== Surface connections ==
When the original IRT station opened in 1908, there was a transfer to the Putnam Avenue and Halsey Street trolley line. Since 1898, a trolley loop had run in front of Borough Hall and along Fulton Street (Cadman Plaza West) and Court Street, but BRT officials expected that the loop would become congested with the construction of the Dual Contracts subway stations. In May 1914, a second loop on nearby Johnson Street opened. Passengers on lines that used the Borough Hall loop, Court Street, or Fulton Street could transfer to the entrance of this station complex bounded by those two streets and the loop, north of Borough Hall.

On April 7, 1930, the BMT eliminated the loop to relieve congestion. Several lines were moved to a loop that traveled north along Adams Street, west along Myrtle Avenue, and southeast along Fulton Street (Cadman Plaza West). Other routes continued west along Livingston Street, north on Court Street, east on Joralemon and Fulton Street, and south on Boerum Place before turning back east along Livingston Street. All streetcar lines in Brooklyn were ultimately discontinued by 1956. Numerous bus lines serve the station as of 2023, namely the B25, B26, B38, B41, B45, B52, B57, B61, B63 and B103.

== See also ==
- List of New York City Designated Landmarks in Brooklyn
- National Register of Historic Places listings in Brooklyn
