= Eastern Parkway–Brooklyn Museum station =

New York City Subway station in Brooklyn

Eastern Parkway– Brooklyn Museum
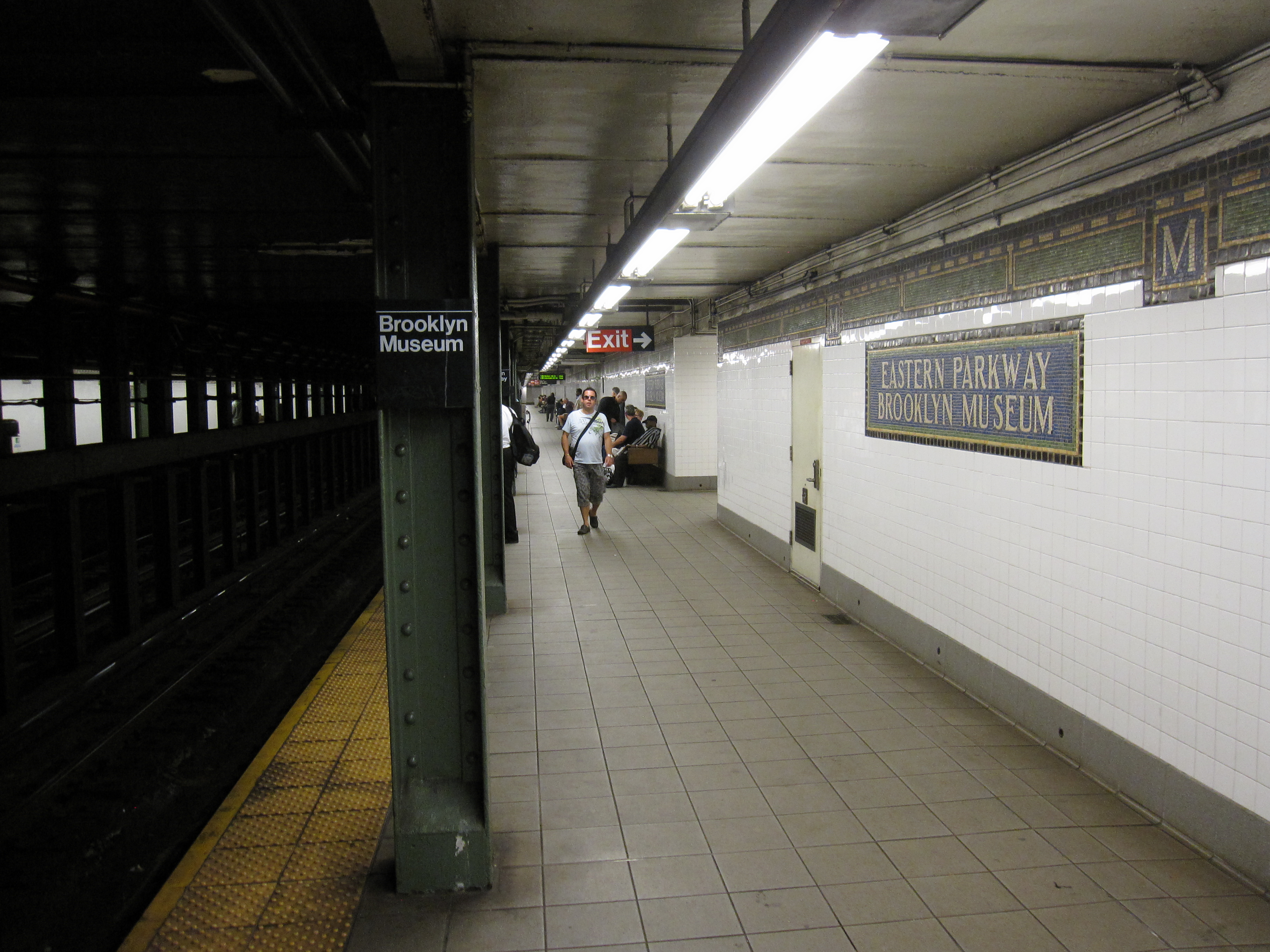
- Manhattan-bound platform

Station statistics
- Address: Washington Avenue & Eastern Parkway; Brooklyn, New York
- Borough: Brooklyn
- Locale: Prospect Heights
- Coordinates: 40.671622°N 73.96275°W
- Division: A (IRT)
- Line: IRT Eastern Parkway Line
- Services: 2 (all times); 3 (all except late nights); 4 (late nights, and limited rush hour service)
- Transit: NYCT Bus: B45, B48
- Structure: Underground
- Platforms: 2 side platforms
- Tracks: 4 (2 on each level)

Other information
- Opened: October 10, 1920; 106 years ago
- Accessible: Yes
- Former/other names: Institute Park

Traffic
- 2025: 1,200,631 ▲2.8%
- Rank: 277 out of 423
Services
Preceding station	New York City Subway	Following station
Grand Army Plaza 2 3 4 via 135th Street	Local	Franklin Avenue–Medgar Evers College 2 3 4 services split
does not stop here
Location
Location within New York City Subway
Location within New York City
Location within New York
Track layout
Street map
Station service legend
Symbol	Description
Stops all times except late nights	Stops all times except late nights
Stops all times	Stops all times
Stops late nights only	Stops late nights only

The Eastern Parkway–Brooklyn Museum station is a local station on the IRT Eastern Parkway Line of the New York City Subway. Located at the intersection of Washington Avenue and Eastern Parkway in Brooklyn adjacent to the Brooklyn Museum, it is served by the 2 train at all times, and by the 3 train at all times except late nights, when the 4 train takes over service.

== History ==
=== Construction and opening ===
After the Interborough Rapid Transit Company (IRT)'s original line opened as far as Atlantic Avenue in Brooklyn, the New York City government began planning new lines. As early as 1903, William Barclay Parsons, chief engineer of the Rapid Transit Commission, had proposed constructing a four-track extension of the IRT line under Flatbush Avenue, running southeast from Atlantic Avenue to Grand Army Plaza. From there, two branches would have extended south to Flatbush and east to Brownsville. This plan did not progress for a decade due to various disputes over the original subway. In 1913, New York City, the Brooklyn Rapid Transit Company (BRT), and the IRT reached an agreement, known as the Dual Contracts, to drastically expand subway service across New York City. As part of the Dual Contracts, two lines under Flatbush Avenue, one each operated by the BRT and IRT, were approved. The IRT was authorized to extend its four-track Brooklyn line under Flatbush Avenue and Eastern Parkway, while the BRT would construct a parallel two-track extension of the Brighton Line.

Groundbreaking for the IRT extension took place on May 23, 1914. The Institute Park station, as the Brooklyn Museum station was originally known, was to be one of the stations on the IRT extension. Before construction on Eastern Parkway even began, Brooklyn park commissioner Raymond Ingersoll recommended that the plans be modified to avoid damaging trees on Eastern Parkway. As a result, plans for the line were changed in October 1914. Under the revised plan, the four-track tunnel under Eastern Parkway was to be double-decked, except at the Franklin Avenue station, where all tracks would be on the same level. In April 1915, nineteen companies submitted bids to construct the section of line between Grand Army Plaza and Nostrand Avenue, including the Institute Park, Franklin Avenue, and Nostrand Avenue stations. The low bidder for this contract was the Inter-Continental Company. which bid $2.7 million; the contract was confirmed that May.

The tunnel between Grand Army Plaza and Nostrand Avenue was built using the cut-and-cover method, with two steam shovels excavating an estimated 600,000 cubic yards (460,000 m^{3}). Dirt from the excavation of the tunnel was used to infill the old Brighton Beach Race Course. Just before the Institute Park station was to open, the IRT received a petition from Brooklyn Institute of Arts and Sciences to change the name of the station to "Brooklyn Museum" to provide an adequate guide for the station's location. As a result, an order was issued on March 3, 1920, changing the name of the station to "Eastern Parkway–Brooklyn Museum". New signs and tiles had to be installed while the station finish work was already underway.

Service on the IRT Eastern Parkway Line had been extended from Atlantic Avenue to Utica Avenue in August 1920, but the Bergen Street, Grand Army Plaza, and Eastern Parkway–Brooklyn Museum stations were not ready to open with the rest of the line. The contractor responsible for completing the three stations had gone bankrupt in the middle of the project. The stations opened on October 9, 1920.

=== Later years ===
During the 1964–1965 fiscal year, the platforms at Eastern Parkway, along with those at four other stations on the Eastern Parkway Line, were lengthened to 525 feet to accommodate a ten-car train of 51-foot IRT cars. The work was performed by the Arthur A. Johnson Corporation.

In 1981, the MTA announced the creation of its Culture Stations program to install public art in the subway. The Culture Stations program was started to deter graffiti, and was inspired by legislation in the New York City Council that mandated that 1% of the cost of constructing public buildings be used for art. The program was modeled on the Louvre – Rivoli station on the Paris Métro, which featured reproductions of the artwork on display in the Louvre. Four stations, namely Eastern Parkway–Brooklyn Museum, Astor Place, 66th Street–Lincoln Center, and Fifth Avenue/53rd Street, were selected for the program due to their proximity to cultural institutions. These would be among the first stations in the MTA's new station refurbishment program, which began in 1982. Initially, there was funding only for the Astor Place and Fifth Avenue/53rd Street stations. The Eastern Parkway and 66th Street stations had still not been renovated by 1986, even though the Astor Place and Fifth Avenue/53rd Street projects had been completed by then.

In 2002, it was announced that Eastern Parkway would be one of ten subway stations citywide to receive renovations. The station subsequently underwent a renovation that lasted between 13 and 15 months; the project was expedited in advance of the museum's anniversary. The project, finished in April 2004, cost $12 million to $14 million to complete. The Brooklyn Museum donated some architectural decorations, which were installed within the station. A new exit was also built, leading to the Brooklyn Museum's new main-entrance pavilion.

As part of the 2015–2019 MTA Capital Program, elevators were added to the platforms and street, which made the station fully compliant with accessibility guidelines under the Americans with Disabilities Act of 1990. A contract for the elevators' construction was awarded in August 2018. Substantial completion was projected for October 2020, but the elevators opened two months later. Designed by Urbahn Architects and constructed by Gramercy Group, the project cost $25.8 million and included three elevators and a rebuilt staircase.

== Station layout ==
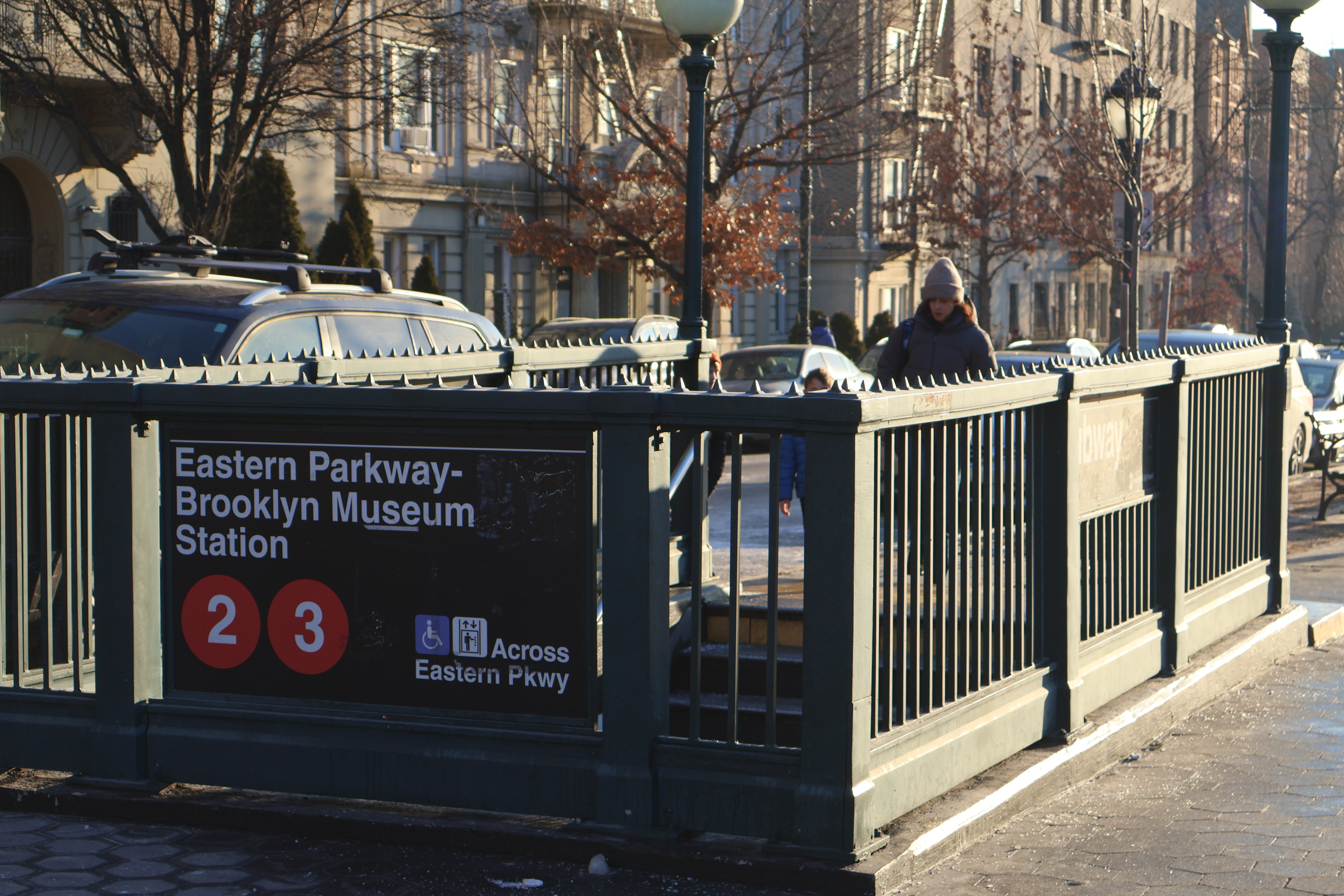
Eastern Parkway - Brooklyn Museum Station Entrance, NW Corner

There are two local tracks with two side platforms. The express tracks pass underneath the station and are not visible from the platforms. The 2 train stops here at all times, while the 3 train stops here at all times except late nights. The 4 train serves the station only during late nights. The next station to the north is Grand Army Plaza, while the next station to the south is Franklin Avenue–Medgar Evers College. Fixed platform barriers, which are intended to prevent commuters falling to the tracks, are positioned near the platform edges. A large mosaic on the walls displays Eastern Parkway and Brooklyn Museum.

In the eastern mezzanine are architectural ornaments from the Brooklyn Museum collection, installed during the 2003 renovation of the station. The station contains 78 ornaments, which include cornices and statues salvaged from demolished buildings. The platforms and the eastern mezzanine formerly displayed abstract art paintings created in 1991 by artist Pat Steir, collectively called the Brueghel Series.

There is an emergency exit from the express level at the south end of each platform. There is a closed western mezzanine blocked by a tiled wall and a door on the west ends of both platforms; the entrances to this mezzanine have been covered with metal hatches on street level.

=== Exits ===
The only two exits to this station are from the east mezzanine. One exit is on the south side of Eastern Parkway, in front of the Brooklyn Museum; the elevator is located by this entrance. The other is in the pedestrian mall on the north side of Eastern Parkway, across the street from the Brooklyn Museum.

== Image gallery ==
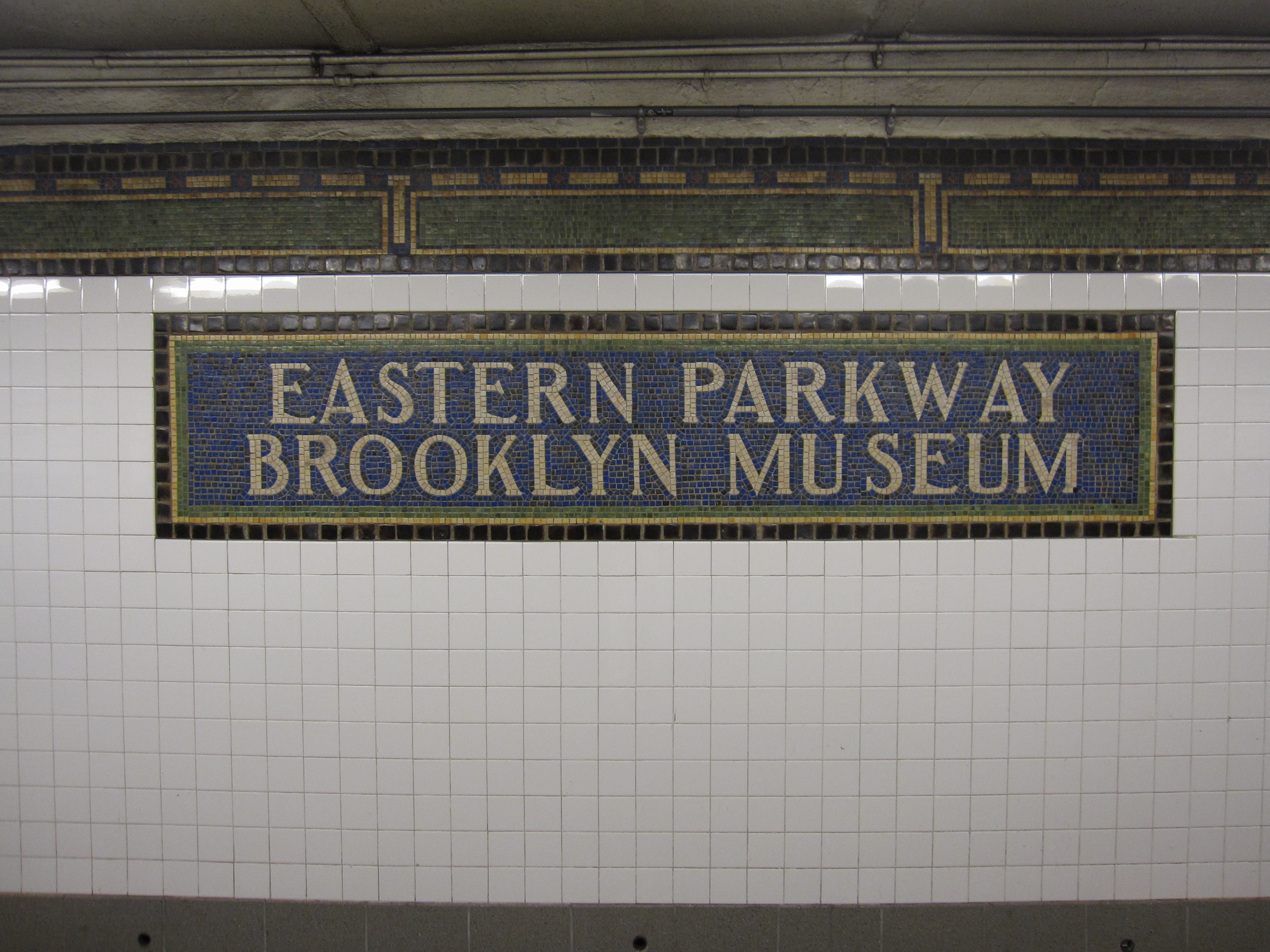

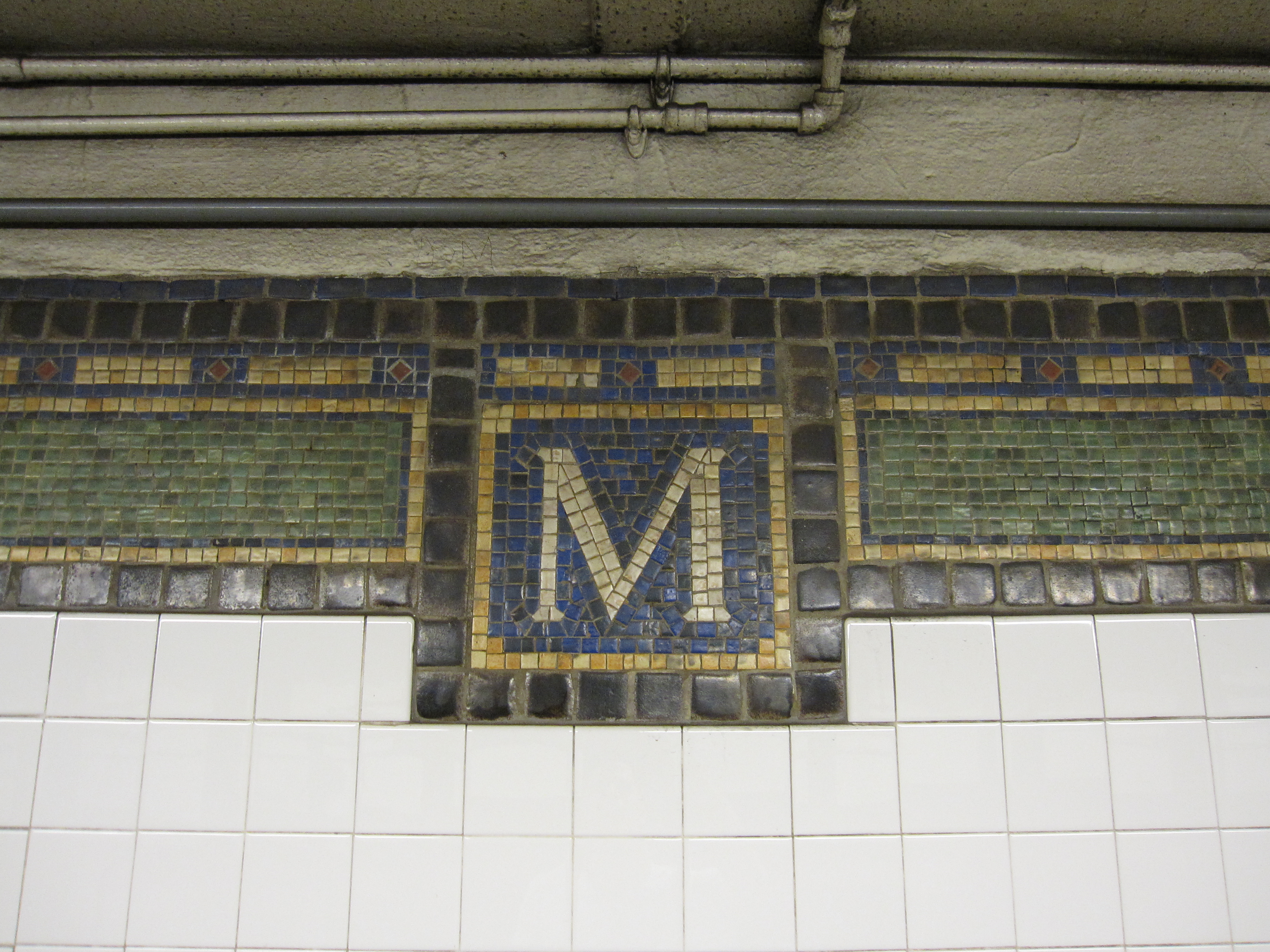

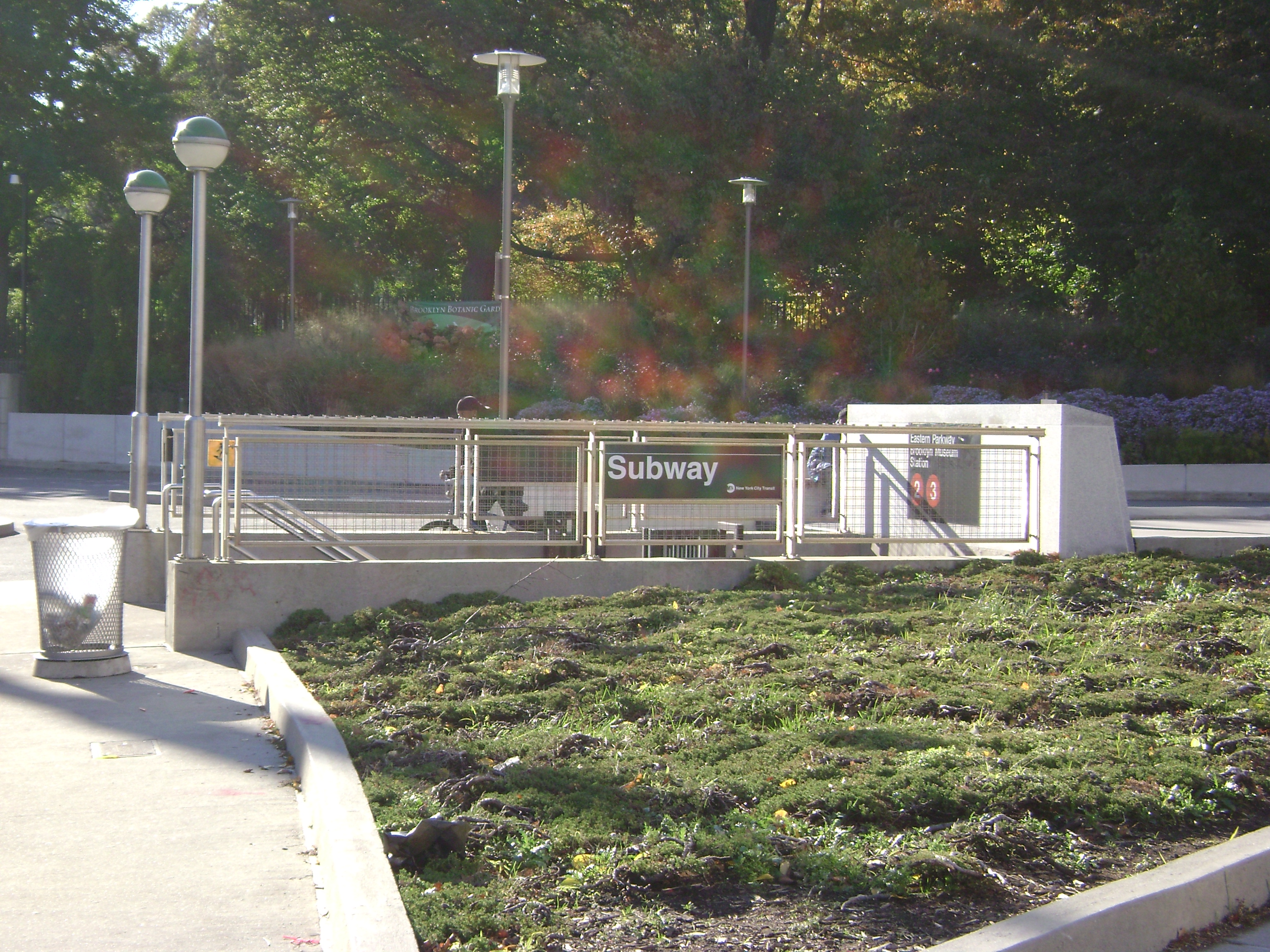

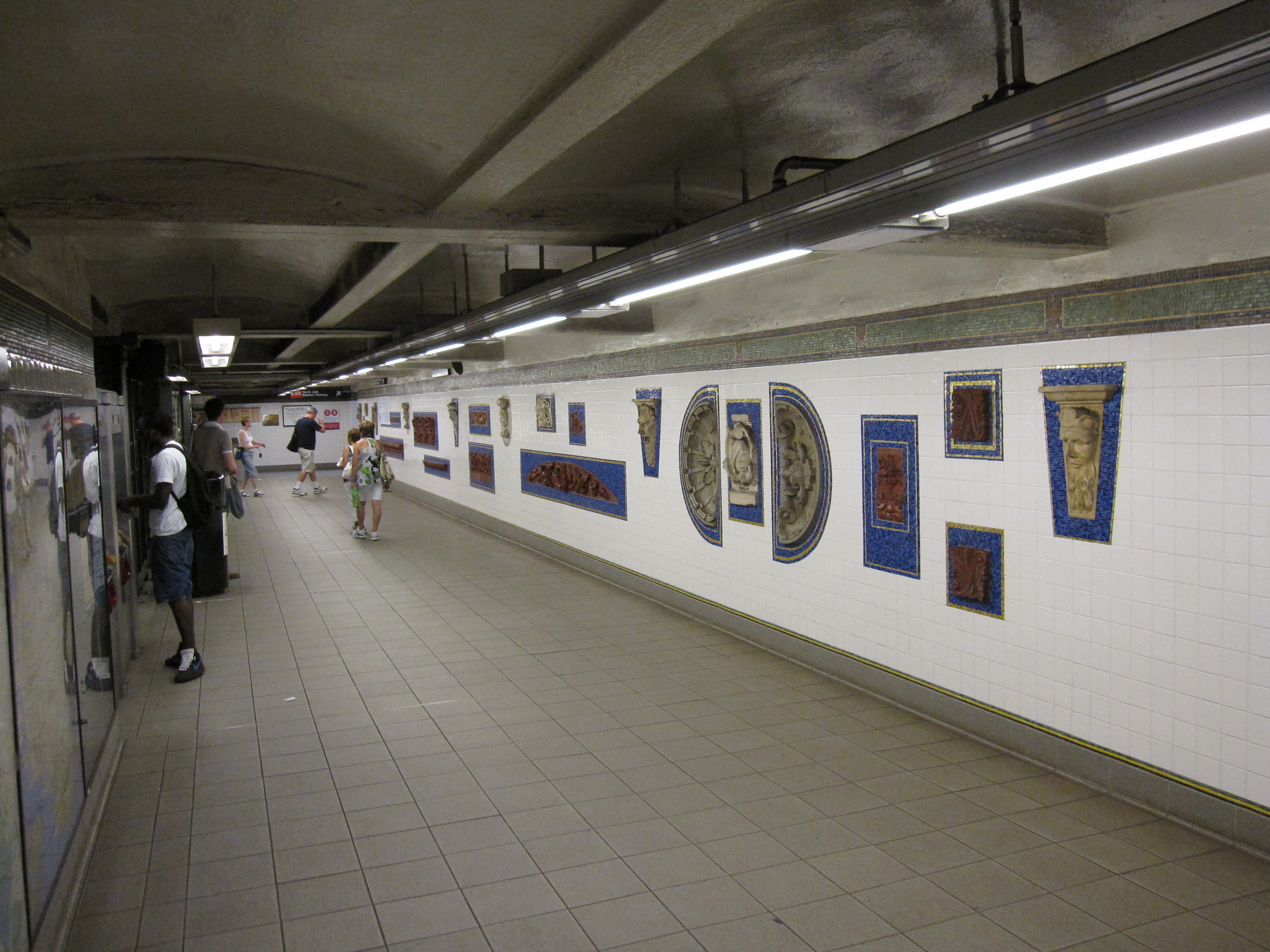
