= Bergen Street station (IRT Eastern Parkway Line) =

New York City Subway station in Brooklyn

Bergen Street
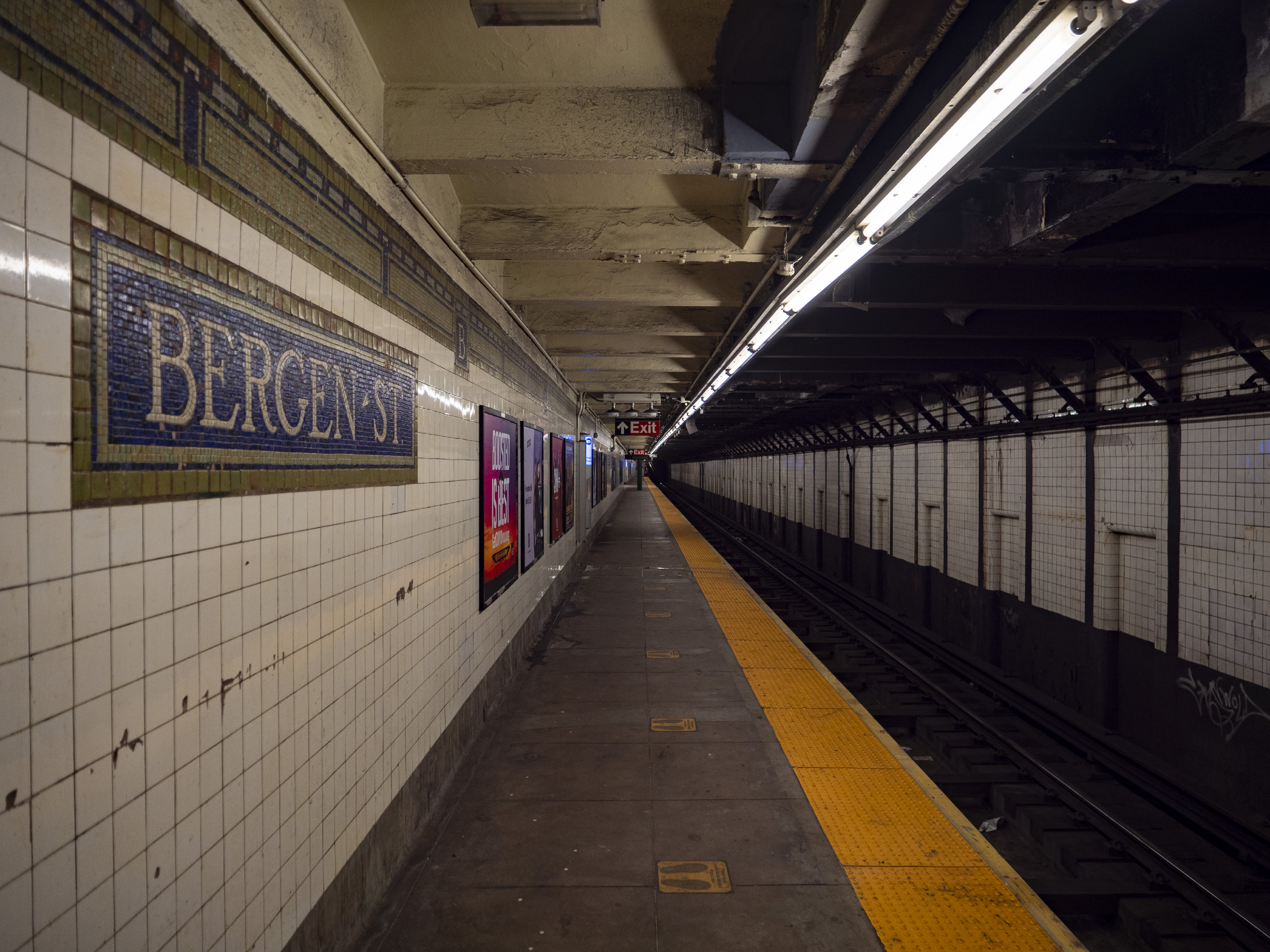
- Northbound platform

Station statistics
- Address: Bergen Street & Flatbush Avenue; Brooklyn, New York
- Borough: Brooklyn
- Locale: Park Slope, Prospect Heights
- Coordinates: 40.680833°N 73.97511°W
- Division: A (IRT)
- Line: IRT Eastern Parkway Line
- Services: 2 (all times); 3 (all except late nights); 4 (late nights, and limited rush hour service)
- Transit: NYCT Bus: B41, B45, B63, B65, B67
- Structure: Underground
- Platforms: 2 side platforms
- Tracks: 6

Other information
- Opened: October 10, 1920 (106 years ago)

Traffic
- 2025: 1,108,981 ▼0.2%
- Rank: 291 out of 423
Services
Preceding station	New York City Subway	Following station
Atlantic Avenue–Barclays Center 2 3 4 via 135th Street	Local	Grand Army Plaza 2 3 4 via Franklin Avenue–Medgar Evers College
does not stop here
Location
Location within New York City Subway
Location within New York City
Location within New York
Track layout
Street map
Station service legend
Symbol	Description
Stops all times except late nights	Stops all times except late nights
Stops all times	Stops all times
Stops late nights only	Stops late nights only

The Bergen Street station is a local station on the IRT Eastern Parkway Line of the New York City Subway. This station is located at Bergen Street and Flatbush Avenue on the border of Park Slope and Prospect Heights in Brooklyn. It is served by the 2 train at all times, and by the 3 train at all times except late nights, when the 4 train takes over service.

== History ==
After the Interborough Rapid Transit Company (IRT)'s original line opened as far as Atlantic Avenue in Brooklyn, the New York City government began planning new lines. As early as 1903, William Barclay Parsons, chief engineer of the Rapid Transit Commission, had proposed constructing a four-track extension of the IRT line under Flatbush Avenue, running southeast from Atlantic Avenue to Grand Army Plaza. From there, two branches would have extended south to Flatbush and east to Brownsville. This plan did not progress for a decade due to various disputes over the original subway. In 1913, New York City, the Brooklyn Rapid Transit Company (BRT), and the IRT reached an agreement, known as the Dual Contracts, to drastically expand subway service across New York City. As part of the Dual Contracts, two lines under Flatbush Avenue, one each operated by the BRT and IRT, were approved. The IRT was authorized to extend its four-track Brooklyn line under Flatbush Avenue and Eastern Parkway, while the BRT would construct a parallel two-track extension of the Brighton Line.

Groundbreaking for the IRT extension took place on May 23, 1914. The Bergen Street station was to be one of the stations on the IRT extension.

Service on the IRT Eastern Parkway Line had been extended from Atlantic Avenue to Utica Avenue in August 1920, but the Bergen Street, Grand Army Plaza, and Eastern Parkway–Brooklyn Museum stations were not ready to open with the rest of the line. The contractor responsible for completing the three stations had gone bankrupt in the middle of the project. The stations opened on October 9, 1920. The BMT Brighton Line was already in use at the time but used trackage that is now part of the Franklin Avenue Shuttle; the opening of the subway line beneath Flatbush Avenue provided a more direct route to Downtown Brooklyn and, eventually, Manhattan.

During the 1964–1965 fiscal year, the platforms at Bergen Street, along with those at four other stations on the Eastern Parkway Line, were lengthened to 525 feet (160 m) to accommodate a ten-car train of 51 foot (16 m) IRT cars. The work was performed by the Arthur A. Johnson Corporation.

== Station layout ==
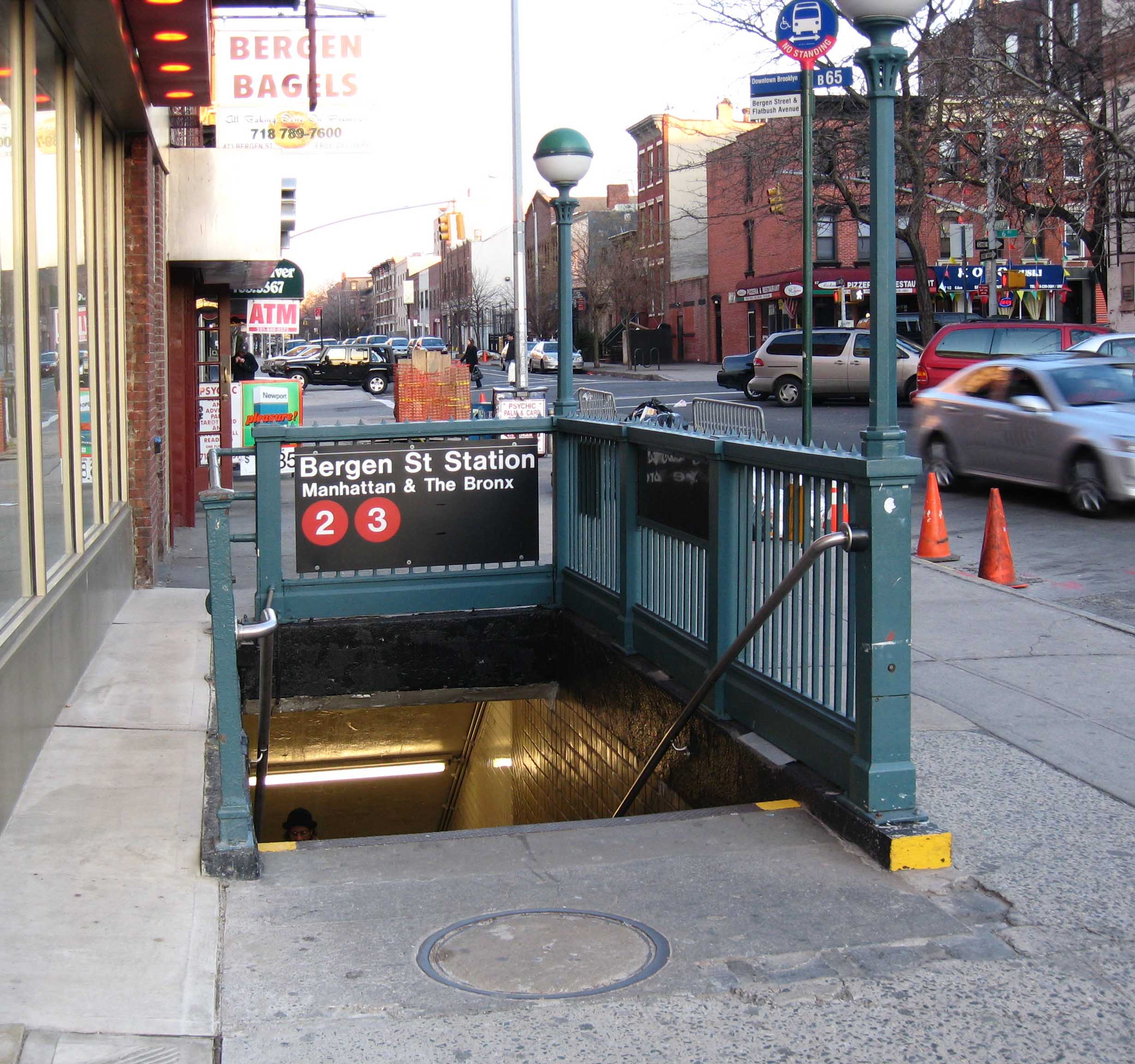
Street stair

The station contains six tracks and two side platforms: the outermost tracks are used by the IRT local trains. To the inside are the IRT express tracks, which slant upward to the inside of the outer local tracks. In between the express tracks are the BMT Brighton Line tracks. Those routes were built at the same time as the tracks at this station as part of the Dual Contracts. A full curtain wall separates the local from the express tracks, though a gap exists in the curtain wall at the northern end of the station. Fixed platform barriers, which are intended to prevent commuters falling to the tracks, are positioned near the platform edges.

The 2 train stops here at all times, while the 3 train stops here at all times except late nights. The 4 train serves the station only during late nights. The next station to the north is Atlantic Avenue–Barclays Center, while the next station to the south is Grand Army Plaza.

Both platforms have their original mosaics. The name tablets read "BERGEN ST." in gold serif font on a blue background and multi-layered green border. The trim line is green with "B" tablets on them on a blue background at regular intervals. At either ends of both platforms, where they were extended in 1964–1965, there are cinderblock tiles with signs reading "BERGEN ST" in sans serif font on a maroon background.

The platforms only have columns at the fare control areas and they are i-beam columns painted green.

=== Exits ===
Each platform has one same-level fare control area at the center and there are no crossovers or crossunders. The southbound platform has an unstaffed fare control area containing a bank of three regular turnstiles, two exit-only turnstiles, and two High Entry/Exit Turnstiles. Outside fare control are two staircases going up to the southwestern corner of Flatbush Avenue and Bergen Street and a passage leading to another staircase going up to the northwestern corner. The Manhattan-bound platform has a full-time turnstile bank and token booth. Outside fare control are and two staircases going up to either eastern corners of Bergen Street and Flatbush Avenue, as well as a closed and sealed stair to the southwestern corner of Sixth Avenue and Bergen Street.
