= Saratoga Avenue station (IRT New Lots Line) =

New York City Subway station in Brooklyn

Saratoga Avenue
- Eastern (railroad southern) end of Manhattan-bound platform

Station statistics
- Address: Saratoga Avenue & Livonia Avenue; Brooklyn, New York
- Borough: Brooklyn
- Locale: Brownsville
- Coordinates: 40.661531°N 73.915586°W
- Division: A (IRT)
- Line: IRT New Lots Line
- Services: 2 (limited rush hour service in the reverse-peak direction); 3 (all except late nights); 4 (late nights, and limited rush hour service in the peak direction); 5 (limited a.m. rush hour service in the northbound direction only)
- Transit: NYCT Bus: B7
- Structure: Elevated
- Platforms: 2 side platforms
- Tracks: 2

Other information
- Opened: November 22, 1920; 105 years ago
- Rebuilt: April 11, 2016; 10 years ago to September 19, 2016; 10 years ago
- Accessible: No; planned

Traffic
- 2025: 1,057,612 ▲14.6%
- Rank: 298 out of 423
Services
Preceding station	New York City Subway	Following station
Sutter Avenue–Rutland Road 2 3 4 5 Harlem–148th Street or Woodlawn	3 (New York City Subway service) 4 (New York City Subway service)	Rockaway Avenue 2 3 4 New Lots Avenue
Location
Location within New York City Subway
Location within New York City
Location within New York
Track layout
Street map
Station service legend
Symbol	Description
Stops all times	Stops all times
Stops late nights only	Stops late nights only
Stops late nights and weekends	Stops late nights and weekends
Stops rush hours only	Stops rush hours only
Stops rush hours in the peak direction only	Stops rush hours in the peak direction only
Stops weekdays during the day	Stops weekdays during the day

The Saratoga Avenue station is a station on the IRT New Lots Line of the New York City Subway. Located at the intersection of Saratoga Avenue and Livonia Avenue in Brownsville, Brooklyn, it is served by the 3 train at all times except late nights, when the 4 train takes over service. During rush hours, occasional 2, 4 and 5 trains also stop here.

== History ==
The New Lots Line was built as a part of Contract 3 of the Dual Contracts between New York City and the Interborough Rapid Transit Company, including this station. It was built as an elevated line because the ground in this area is right above the water table, and as a result the construction of a subway would have been prohibitively expensive. The first portion of the line between Utica Avenue and Junius Street, including this station, opened on November 22, 1920, with shuttle trains operating over this route. The line was completed to New Lots Avenue on October 16, 1922, with a two-car train running on the northbound track. On October 31, 1924, through service to New Lots Avenue was begun.

From April 11, 2016 until September 19, 2016, Saratoga Avenue and Pennsylvania Avenue were closed for renovation. As part of its 2025–2029 Capital Program, the MTA has proposed making the station wheelchair-accessible in compliance with the Americans with Disabilities Act of 1990.

== Station layout ==
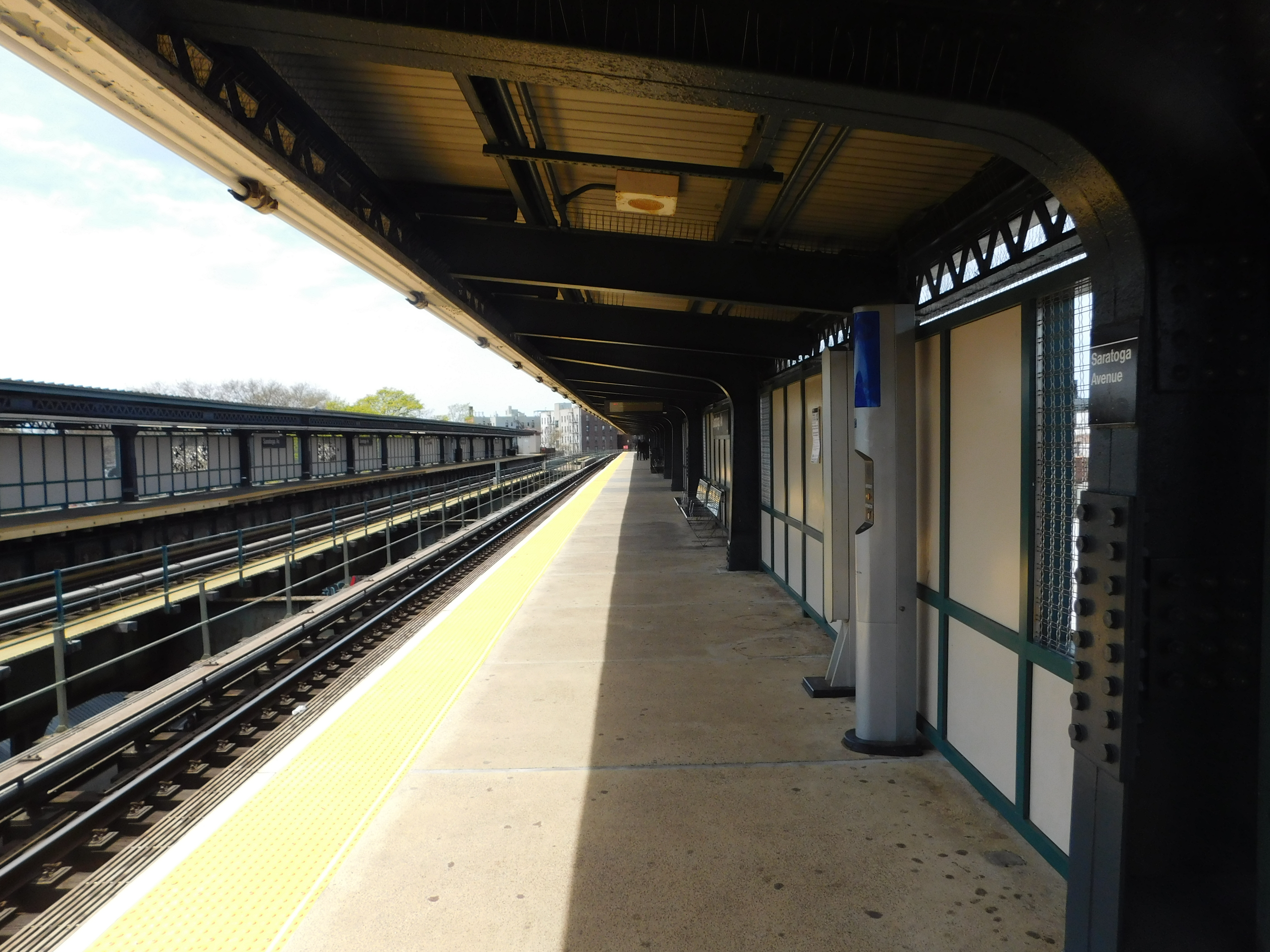
Manhattan-bound platform

This elevated station has two side platforms and two tracks with space for a center track that was never installed. Both platforms are longer than the standard IRT train length of 514 feet (157 m) and have beige windscreens and brown and red canopies with green canopies with green frames and support columns for their entire length except for a small section at the west (railroad north) end. Here, they have waist-high black steel fences with two lampposts and one standard black station sign in white lettering in-between them. The windscreens and canopy frames also have black and white station signs.

The station house had several enamel white-on-navy blue "To Street" porcelain signs directing passengers to the street stairs, one of which also had porcelain signs of the same style at the bottom of the canopy that said, "Interborough Rapid Transit Company: To All Trains." These signs were removed during the 2016 renovation.

=== Exits ===
The station's only entrance/exit is an elevated station house beneath the tracks at the extreme east (railroad south) end. Inside fare control, it has a waiting area that allows a free transfer between directions, one staircase to the Manhattan-bound platform and two to the New Lots Avenue-bound one. One of those staircases is built adjacent to the platform instead of directly on it and connected to the station house with a wooden elevated passageway. Outside fare control, there is a turnstile bank, token booth, and three staircases going down to all corners of Saratoga and Livonia Avenues except the northeast one.
