= Rockaway Avenue station (IRT New Lots Line) =

New York City Subway station in Brooklyn

Rockaway Avenue
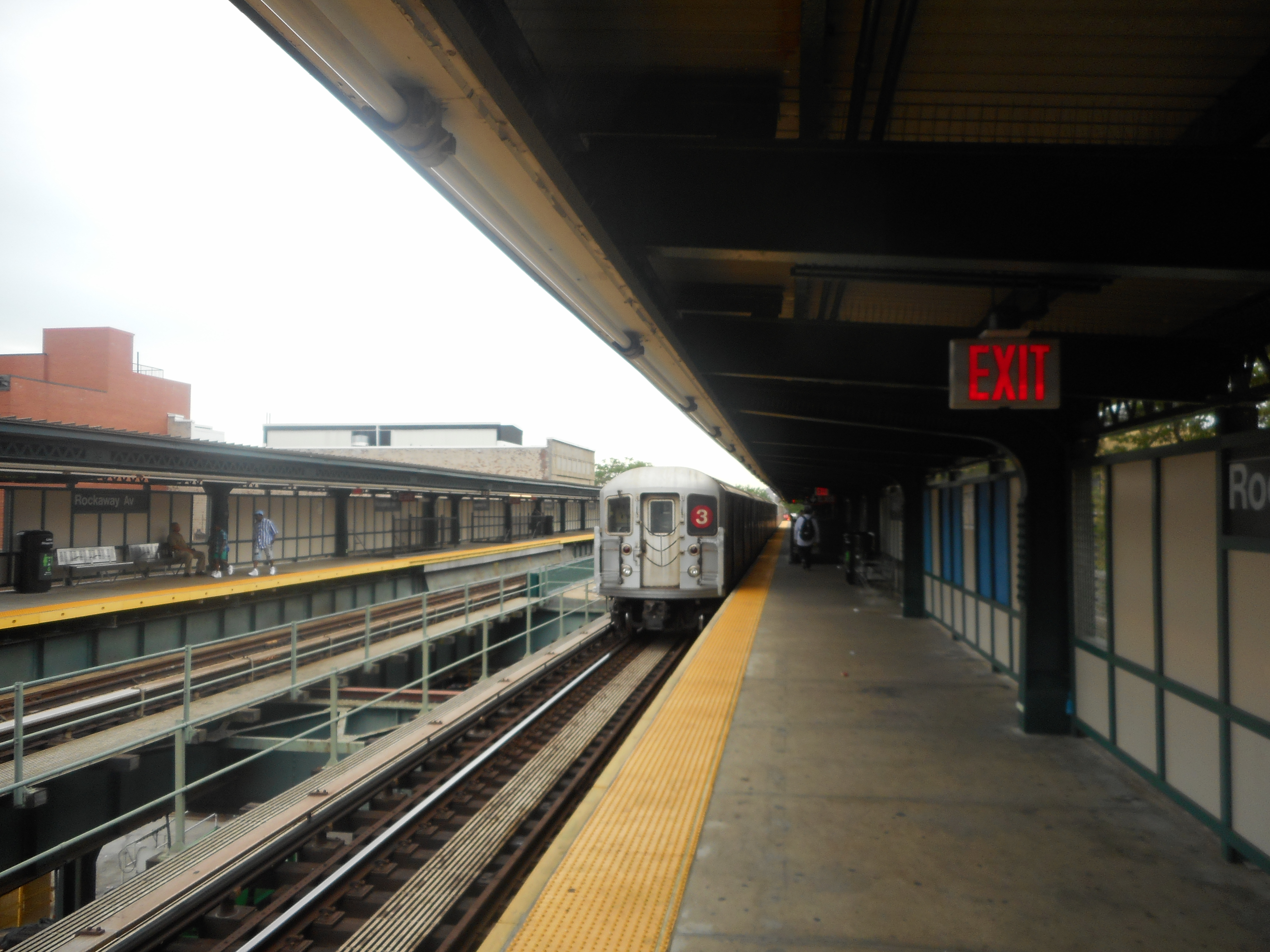
- Northbound 3 train leaving station

Station statistics
- Address: Rockaway Avenue & Livonia Avenue; Brooklyn, New York
- Borough: Brooklyn
- Locale: Brownsville
- Coordinates: 40.662541°N 73.908892°W
- Division: A (IRT)
- Line: IRT New Lots Line
- Services: 2 (limited rush hour service in the reverse-peak direction); 3 (all except late nights); 4 (late nights, and limited rush hour service in the peak direction); 5 (limited a.m. rush hour service in the northbound direction only)
- Transit: NYCT Bus: B60
- Structure: Elevated
- Platforms: 2 side platforms
- Tracks: 2

Other information
- Opened: November 22, 1920; 105 years ago
- Rebuilt: April 20, 2015; 11 years ago to March 28, 2016; 10 years ago

Traffic
- 2025: 984,783 ▲5.4%
- Rank: 314 out of 423
Services
Preceding station	New York City Subway	Following station
Saratoga Avenue 2 3 4 5 toward Harlem–148th Street	3 (New York City Subway service)	Junius Street 2 3 4 toward New Lots Avenue
Location
Location within New York City Subway
Location within New York City
Location within New York
Track layout
Street map
Station service legend
Symbol	Description
Stops all times	Stops all times
Stops late nights only	Stops late nights only
Stops late nights and weekends	Stops late nights and weekends
Stops rush hours only	Stops rush hours only
Stops rush hours in the peak direction only	Stops rush hours in the peak direction only
Stops weekdays during the day	Stops weekdays during the day

The Rockaway Avenue station is a station on the IRT New Lots Line of the New York City Subway, located at Rockaway Avenue and Livonia Avenue in Brownsville, Brooklyn. It is served by the 3 train at all times except late nights, when the 4 train takes over service. During rush hours, occasional 2, 4 and 5 trains also stop here.

== History ==
The New Lots Line was built as a part of Contract 3 of the Dual Contracts between New York City and the Interborough Rapid Transit Company, including this station. It was built as an elevated line because the ground in this area is right above the water table, and as a result the construction of a subway would have been prohibitively expensive. The first portion of the line between Utica Avenue and Junius Street, including this station, opened on November 22, 1920, with shuttle trains operating over this route. The line was completed to New Lots Avenue on October 16, 1922, with a two-car train running on the northbound track. On October 31, 1924, through service to New Lots Avenue was begun.

The New York City Board of Transportation announced plans in November 1949 to extend platforms at several IRT stations, including Rockaway Avenue, to accommodate all doors on ten-car trains. Although ten-car trains already operated on the line, the rear car could not open its doors at the station because the platforms were so short. Funding for the platform extensions was included in the city's 1950 capital budget.

From April 20, 2015 to March 28, 2016, Rockaway Avenue and Van Siclen Avenue were closed for renovations.

== Station layout ==
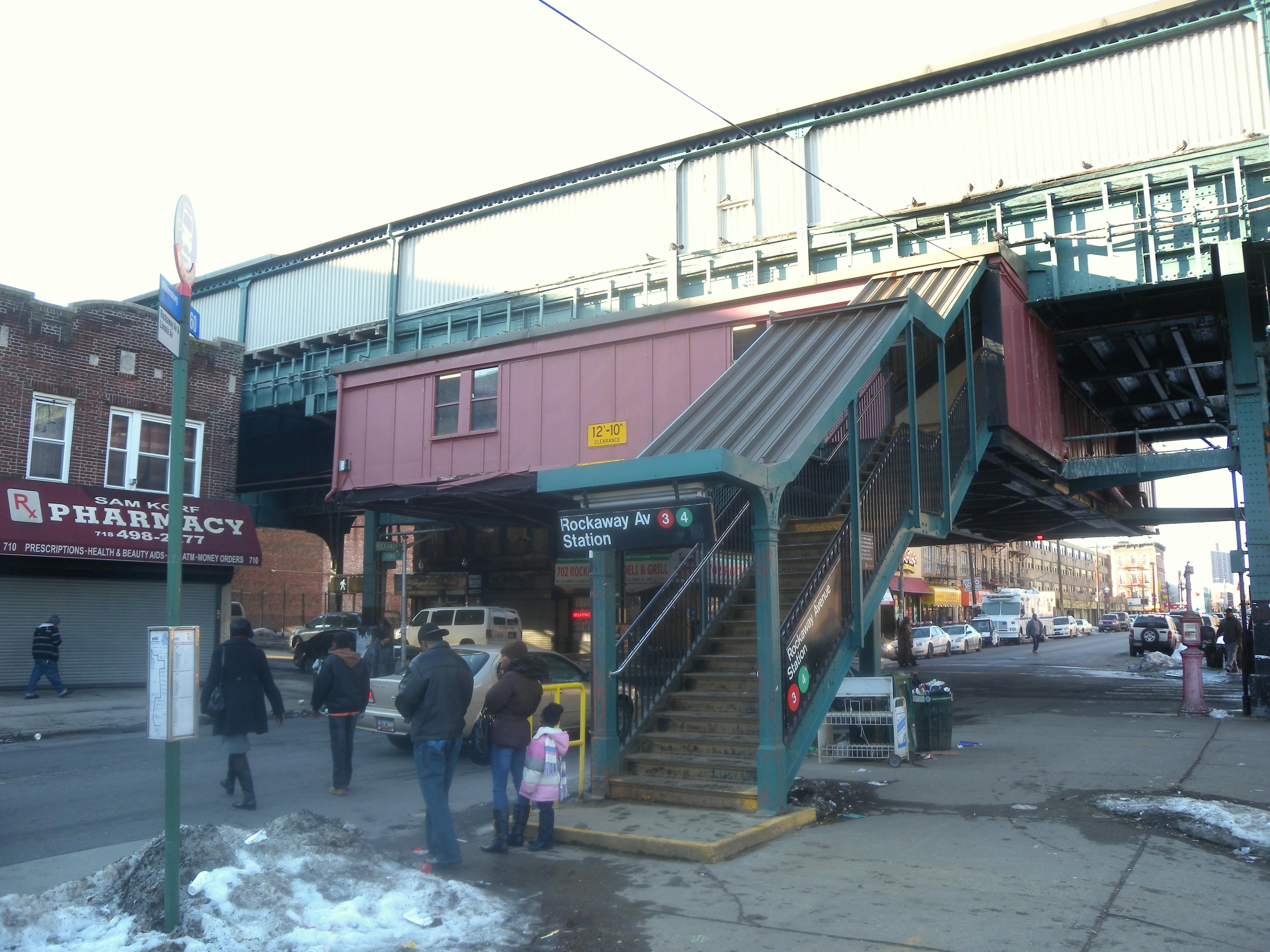
Entrance

This station has two side platforms and two tracks. Between the two tracks, there is space for an additional third track that was never installed.

=== Exits ===
This station's only exit is via a wooden mezzanine under the tracks. The mezzanine has a crossunder and metal canopies. Outside fare control, stairs go to the northwest and southeast corners of Livonia and Rockaway Avenues.
