= Sutter Avenue–Rutland Road station =

New York City Subway station in Brooklyn

Sutter Avenue–Rutland Road
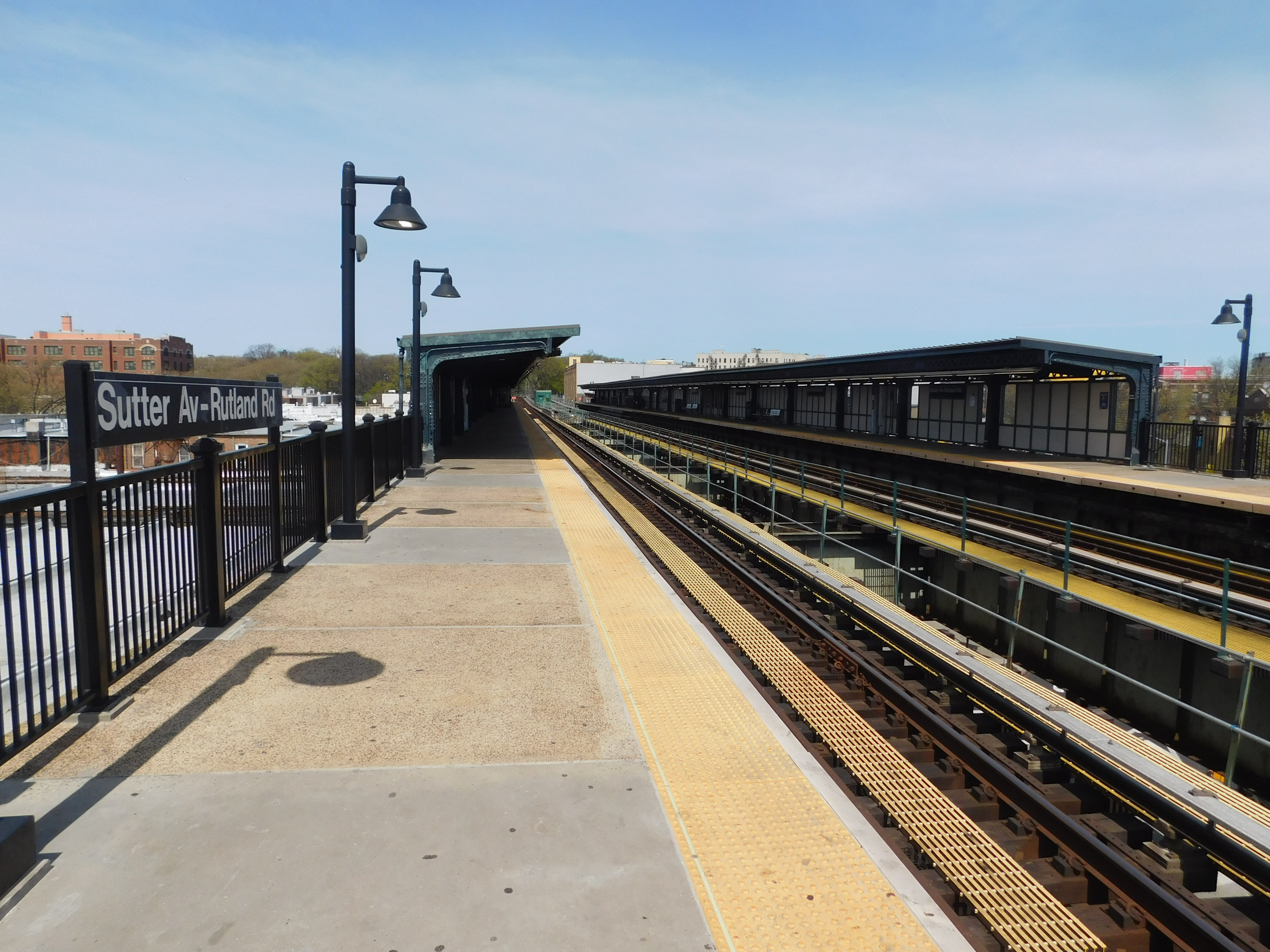
- The Sutter Avenue–Rutland Road station in April 2025, post-renovation.

Station statistics
- Address: Sutter Avenue / Rutland Road & East 98th Street; Brooklyn, New York
- Borough: Brooklyn
- Locale: Brownsville, East Flatbush
- Coordinates: 40.664884°N 73.922882°W
- Division: A (IRT)
- Line: IRT New Lots Line
- Services: 2 (limited rush hour service in the reverse-peak direction); 3 (all except late nights); 4 (late nights, and limited rush hour service in the peak direction); 5 (limited a.m. rush hour service in the northbound direction only)
- Transit: NYCT Bus: B12, B15, B47
- Structure: Elevated
- Platforms: 2 side platforms
- Tracks: 2

Other information
- Opened: November 22, 1920; 105 years ago
- Rebuilt: October 5, 2016; 10 years ago to June 19, 2017; 9 years ago

Traffic
- 2025: 1,364,508 ▲8.3%
- Rank: 246 out of 423
Services
Preceding station	New York City Subway	Following station
Crown Heights–Utica Avenue 2 3 4 5 toward Harlem–148th Street	3 (New York City Subway service)	Saratoga Avenue 2 3 4 toward New Lots Avenue
Location
Location within New York City Subway
Location within New York City
Location within New York
Track layout
Street map
Station service legend
Symbol	Description
Stops all times	Stops all times
Stops late nights only	Stops late nights only
Stops late nights and weekends	Stops late nights and weekends
Stops rush hours only	Stops rush hours only
Stops rush hours in the peak direction only	Stops rush hours in the peak direction only
Stops weekdays during the day	Stops weekdays during the day

The Sutter Avenue–Rutland Road station is a station on the IRT New Lots Line of the New York City Subway, located at the intersection of Sutter Avenue, Rutland Road, and East 98th Street all on the border of the East Flatbush and Brownsville neighborhoods in the Brooklyn borough of New York City. It is served by the 3 train at all times except late nights, when the 4 train takes over service. During rush hours, occasional 2 and 5 trains also stop here.

== History ==
The New Lots Line was built as a part of Contract 3 of the Dual Contracts between New York City and the Interborough Rapid Transit Company, including this station. It was built as an elevated line because the ground in this area is right above the water table, and as a result the construction of a subway would have been prohibitively expensive. The first portion of the line between Utica Avenue and Junius Street, including this station, opened on November 22, 1920, with shuttle trains operating over this route. The line was completed to New Lots Avenue on October 16, 1922, with a two-car train running on the northbound track. On October 31, 1924, through service to New Lots Avenue began.

Northbound platform in January 2016, pre-renovation

The New York City Board of Transportation announced plans in November 1949 to extend platforms at several IRT stations, including Sutter Avenue, to accommodate all doors on ten-car trains. Although ten-car trains already operated on the line, the rear car could not open its doors at the station because the platforms were so short. Funding for the platform extensions was included in the city's 1950 capital budget.

From October 5, 2016, to June 19, 2017, this station and Junius Street were closed for renovations.

== Station layout ==
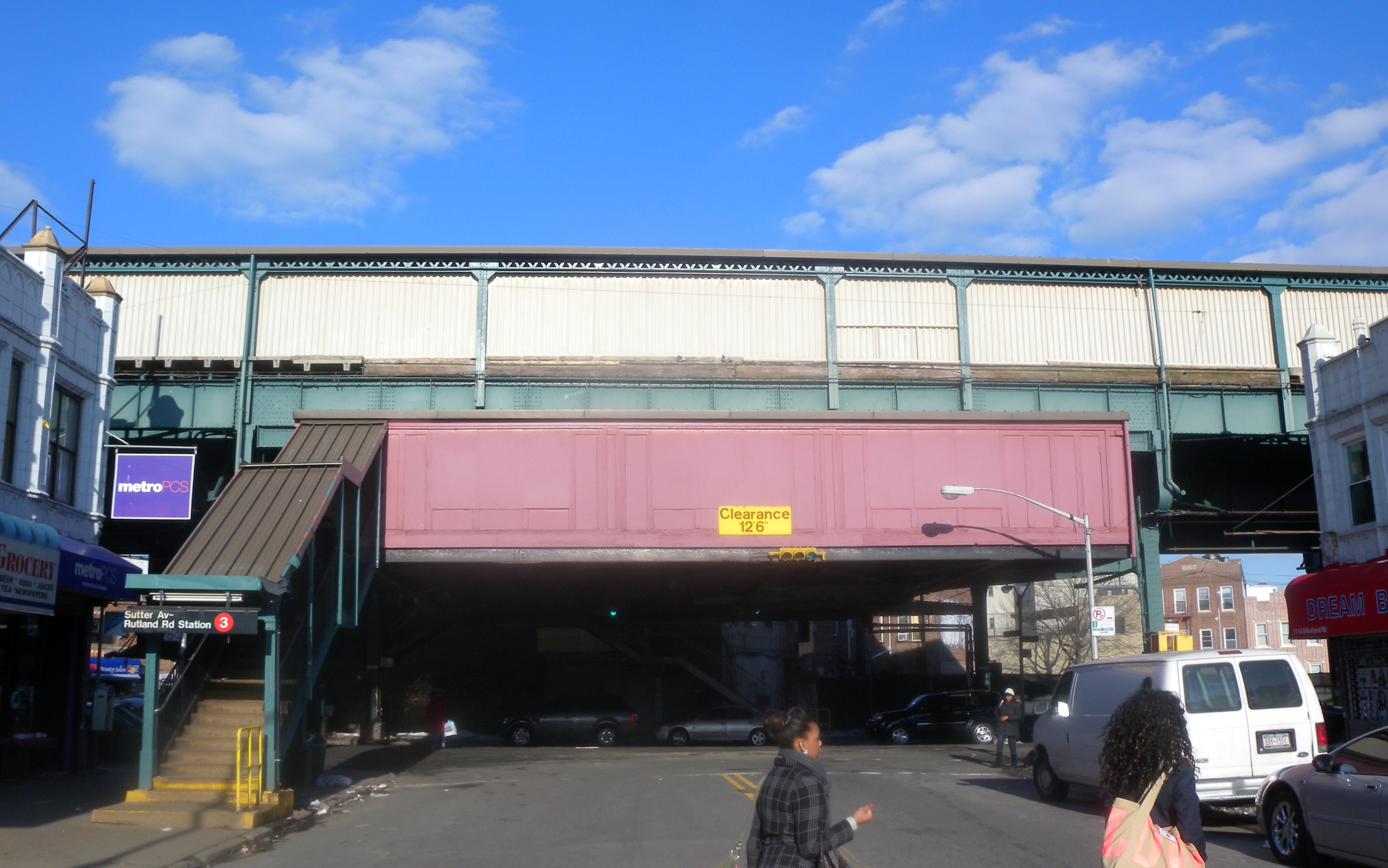
West stair to mezzanine, seen from street

This elevated station has two side platforms and two tracks with space for a center track that was never added. The station is between Crown Heights–Utica Avenue to the north and Saratoga Avenue to the south. The middle third of both platforms have beige windscreens and brown canopies supported by green frames and support columns. The remaining two-thirds have black, waist-high steel fences with lampposts at regular intervals. The station signs are in the standard black name plates in white lettering.

This is the northernmost station on the IRT New Lots Line. North of the station, the line curves west under Eastern Parkway and ramps down underground to become the IRT Eastern Parkway Line. The Manhattan-bound track goes underneath the New Lots Avenue-bound track on the south side of the IRT Eastern Parkway Line. A center track begins at a bumper block near the tunnel portal and merges with the two express tracks of the Eastern Parkway line south of Utica Avenue. South of the station, the line curves east above Livonia Avenue and continues along that route with six more stops.

=== Exits ===
This station has one elevated station house beneath the platforms and tracks. Two staircases from the center of each platform go down to a waiting area/crossunder, where a turnstile bank provides access to/from the station. Outside fare control, there is a token booth and two staircases facing in opposite directions going down to the east side of East 98th Street at the T-intersection of Rutland Road. The north staircase is near the southern corner of the T-intersection of Sutter Avenue and East 98th Street. A third staircase goes down to the northwest corner of East 98th Street and Rutland Road.
