= Pennsylvania Avenue station (IRT New Lots Line) =

New York City Subway station in Brooklyn

Pennsylvania Avenue
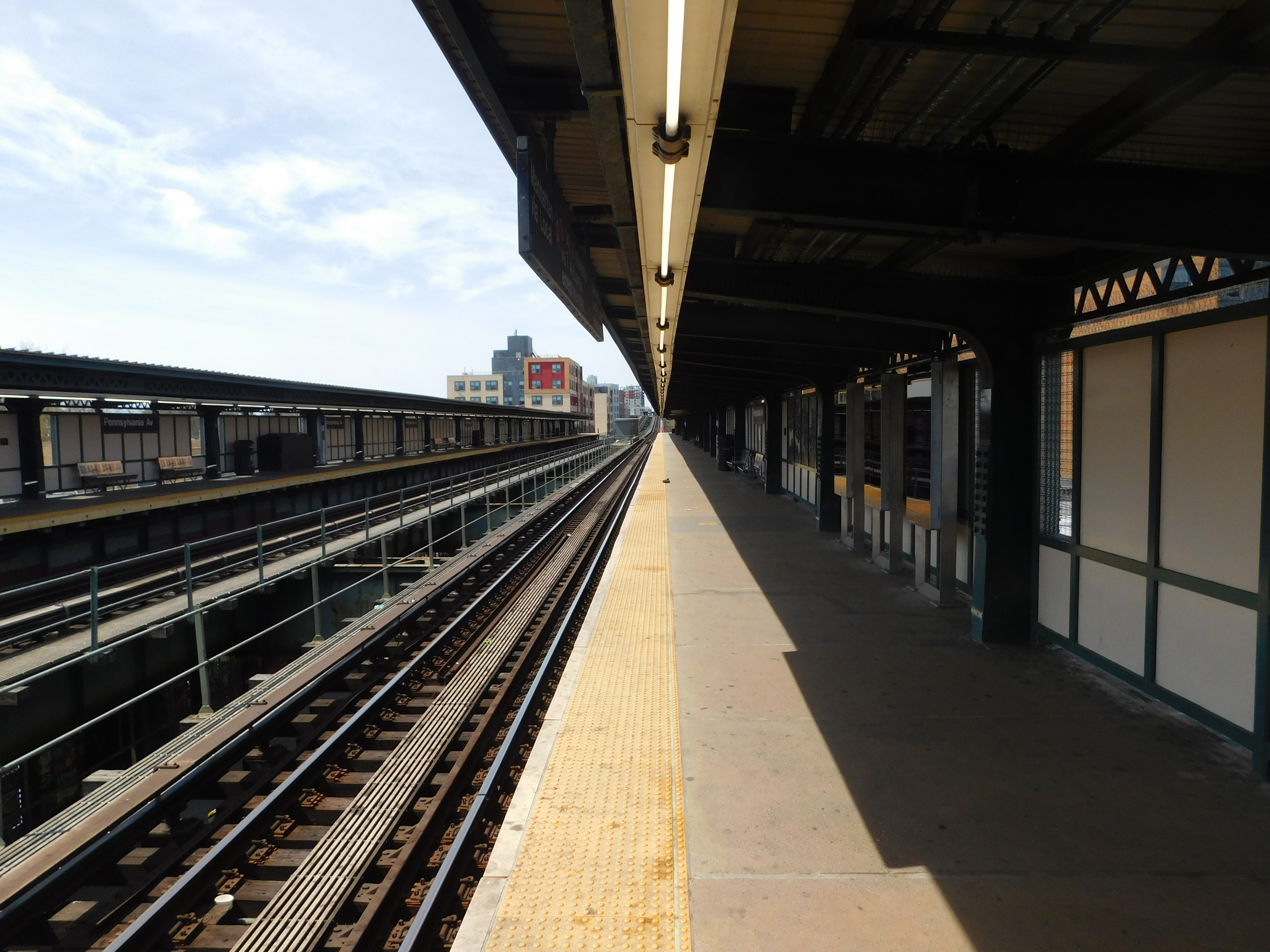
- Manhattan-bound platform

Station statistics
- Address: Pennsylvania Avenue & Livonia Avenue; Brooklyn, New York
- Borough: Brooklyn
- Locale: East New York
- Coordinates: 40.664722°N 73.894129°W
- Division: A (IRT)
- Line: IRT New Lots Line
- Services: 2 (limited rush hour service in the reverse-peak direction); 3 (all except late nights); 4 (late nights, and limited rush hour service in the peak direction); 5 (limited a.m. rush hour service in the northbound direction only)
- Transit: NYCT Bus: B20, B83
- Structure: Elevated
- Platforms: 2 side platforms
- Tracks: 2

Other information
- Opened: December 24, 1920; 105 years ago
- Rebuilt: Whole station: April 11, 2016; 10 years ago to September 19, 2016; 10 years ago; Mezzanine: October 27, 2016; 9 years ago to March 3, 2017; 9 years ago

Traffic
- 2025: 791,529 ▲0.9%
- Rank: 341 out of 423
Services
Preceding station	New York City Subway	Following station
Junius Street 2 3 4 5 toward Harlem–148th Street	3 (New York City Subway service)	Van Siclen Avenue 2 3 4 toward New Lots Avenue
Location
Location within New York City Subway
Location within New York City
Location within New York
Track layout
Street map
Station service legend
Symbol	Description
Stops all times	Stops all times
Stops late nights only	Stops late nights only
Stops late nights and weekends	Stops late nights and weekends
Stops rush hours only	Stops rush hours only
Stops rush hours in the peak direction only	Stops rush hours in the peak direction only
Stops weekdays during the day	Stops weekdays during the day

The Pennsylvania Avenue station is a station on the IRT New Lots Line of the New York City Subway. Located at the intersection of Pennsylvania and Livonia Avenues in East New York, Brooklyn, it is served by the 3 train at all times except late nights, when the 4 train takes over service. During rush hours, occasional 2, 4 and 5 trains also stop here.

== History ==
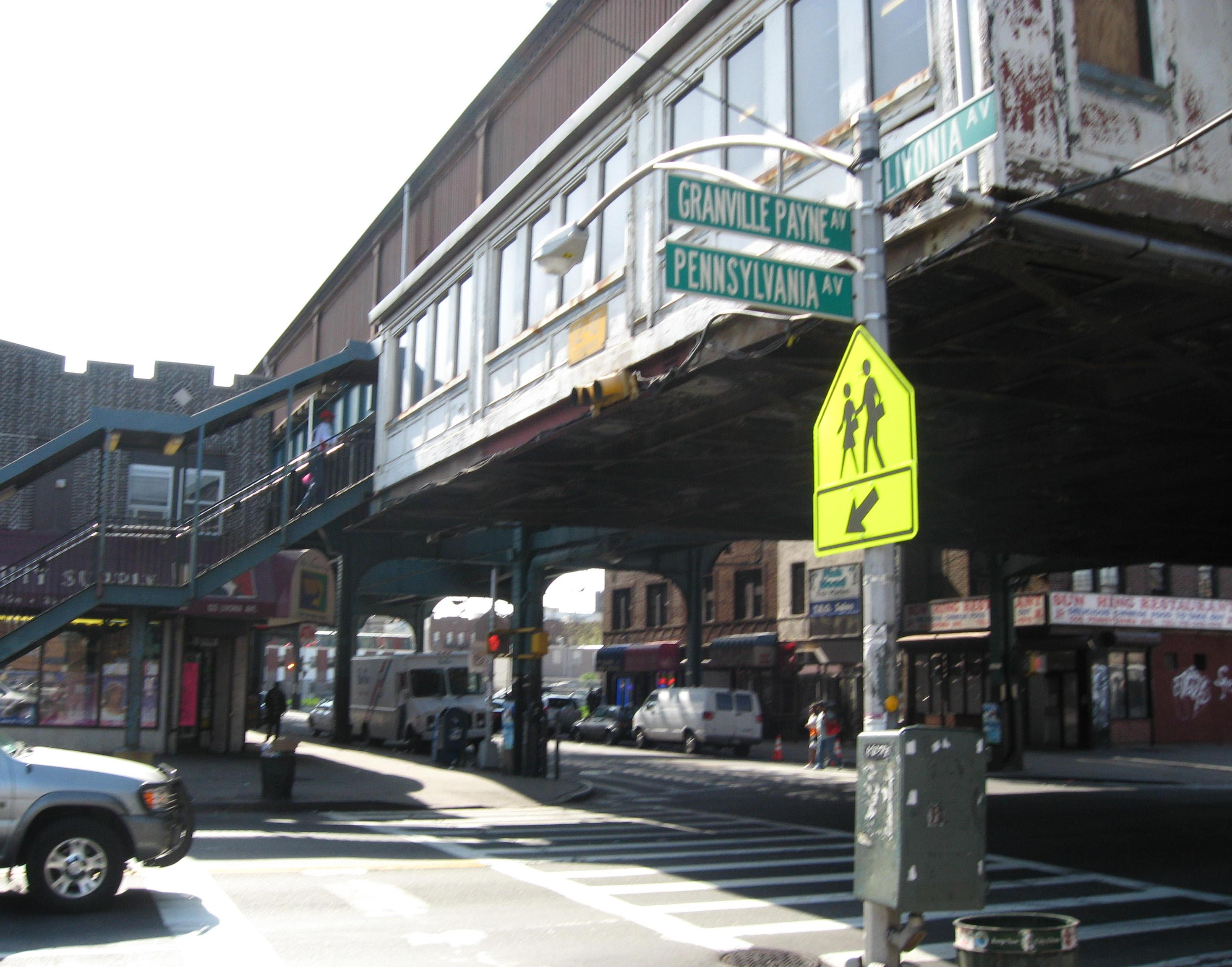
Southern stair

The New Lots Line was built as a part of Contract 3 of the Dual Contracts between New York City and the Interborough Rapid Transit Company, including this station. It was built as an elevated line because the ground in this area is right above the water table, and as a result the construction of a subway would have been prohibitively expensive. The first portion of the line between Utica Avenue and Junius Street opened on November 22, 1920, with shuttle trains operating over this route. The line opened one more stop farther to the east to Pennsylvania Avenue on December 24, 1920. At that date, only the southbound platform was used.

While work at New Lots Avenue and at Van Siclen Avenue was practically completed in 1921, they could not open yet because trains could not run to the terminal until track work, the signal tower, and the compressor room were in service. Work began on June 19, 1922, and on October 16, 1922, shuttles began operating between this station and New Lots Avenue. A two-car train operated on a single track on the northbound track. On October 31, 1924, through service to New Lots Avenue was begun.

From April 11, 2016 until September 19, 2016, Saratoga Avenue and Pennsylvania Avenue were closed for renovation. A truck accident on October 27, 2016 damaged the station's mezzanine, so it was closed again for repairs until March 3, 2017. The platforms and tracks were undamaged in the accident.

== Station layout ==
This elevated station has two side platforms and two tracks with space for a center track that was never installed. Both platforms have beige windscreens and brown canopies with green support frames and columns that run along the entire length except for a small section at the extreme west (railroad north) end. Here, there are only waist-high black steel fences. The station name plates are in the standard black with white lettering. The platforms are slightly longer than the standard IRT train length of 514 feet (157 m).

=== Exits ===
The station's only entrance/exit is an elevated station house beneath the tracks. Inside fare control, there is a turnstile bank, waiting area that allows a free transfer between directions, and a single staircase to each platform at their extreme east (railroad south) ends. Outside fare control, there is a token booth and two staircases going down to the northeast and southwest corners of Pennsylvania and Livonia Avenues. The landing on the south side of the station house has an exit-only turnstile to allow passengers on New Lots Avenue-bound trains to exit the station without having to go through the station house. The exterior of the station house, including the staircase canopies, doors, and fences were painted red in July 2009.
