= Van Siclen Avenue station (IRT New Lots Line) =

New York City Subway station in Brooklyn

Van Siclen Avenue
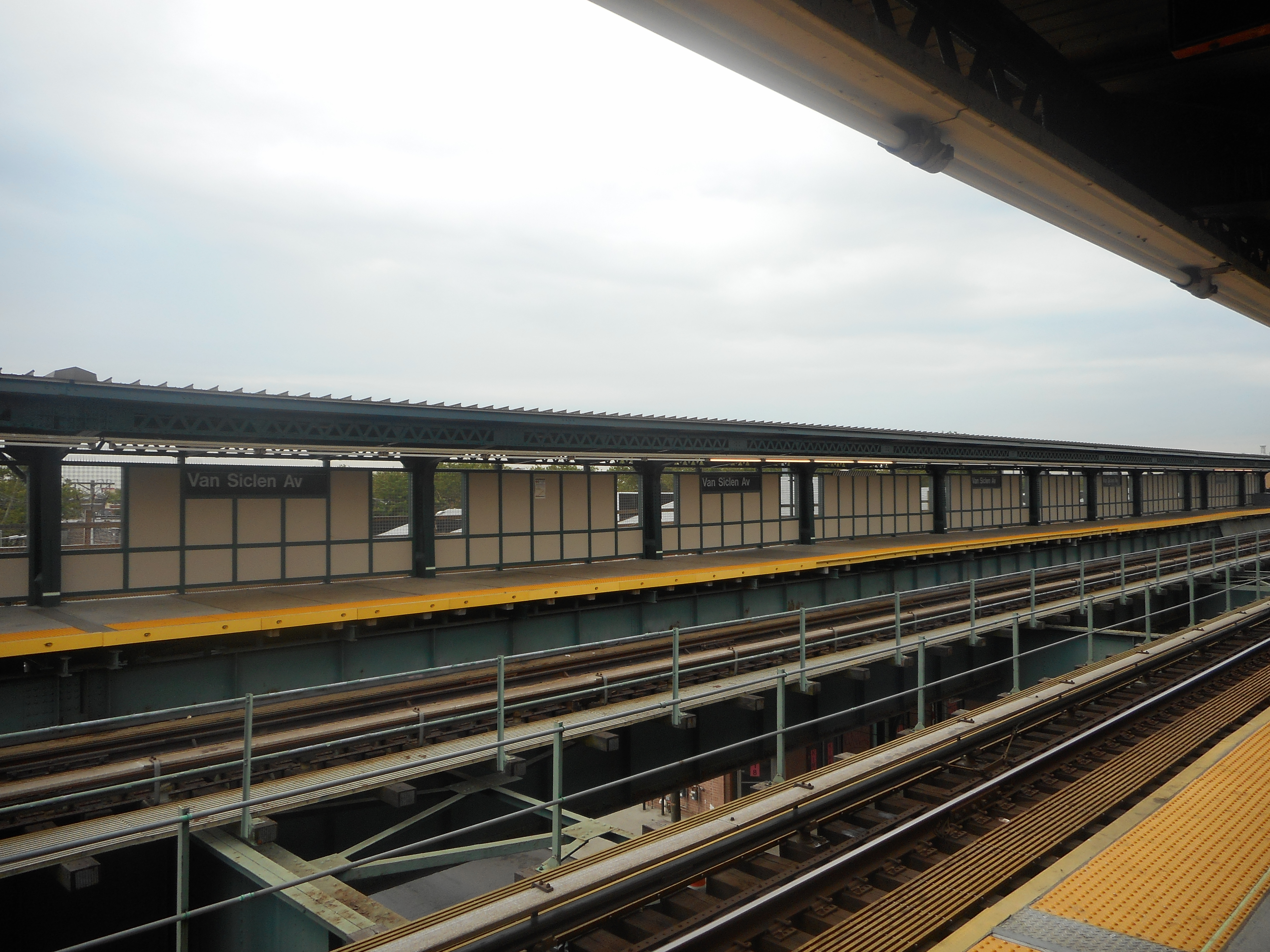
- View of southbound platform

Station statistics
- Address: Van Siclen Avenue & Livonia Avenue; Brooklyn, New York
- Borough: Brooklyn
- Locale: East New York
- Coordinates: 40.665535°N 73.888593°W
- Division: A (IRT)
- Line: IRT New Lots Line
- Services: 2 (limited rush hour service in the reverse-peak direction); 3 (all except late nights); 4 (late nights, and limited rush hour service in the peak direction); 5 (limited a.m. rush hour service in the northbound direction only)
- Structure: Elevated
- Platforms: 2 side platforms
- Tracks: 2

Other information
- Opened: October 16, 1922; 104 years ago
- Rebuilt: April 20, 2015; 11 years ago to March 28, 2016; 10 years ago

Traffic
- 2025: 498,560 ▲4.1%
- Rank: 396 out of 423
Services
Preceding station	New York City Subway	Following station
Pennsylvania Avenue 2 3 4 5 toward Harlem–148th Street	3 (New York City Subway service)	New Lots Avenue 2 3 4 Terminus
Location
Location within New York City Subway
Location within New York City
Location within New York
Track layout
Street map
Station service legend
Symbol	Description
Stops all times	Stops all times
Stops late nights only	Stops late nights only
Stops late nights and weekends	Stops late nights and weekends
Stops rush hours only	Stops rush hours only
Stops rush hours in the peak direction only	Stops rush hours in the peak direction only
Stops weekdays during the day	Stops weekdays during the day

The Van Siclen Avenue station is a station on the IRT New Lots Line of the New York City Subway, located at the intersection of Van Siclen Avenue and Livonia Avenue in East New York, Brooklyn. It is served by the 3 train at all times except late nights, when the 4 train takes over service. During rush hours, occasional 2, 4 and 5 trains also stop here.

== History ==
The New Lots Line was built as a part of Contract 3 of the Dual Contracts between New York City and the Interborough Rapid Transit Company, including this station. It was built as an elevated line because the ground in this area is right above the water table, and as a result the construction of a subway would have been prohibitively expensive. The first portion of the line between Utica Avenue and Junius Street opened on November 22, 1920, with shuttle trains operating over this route. The line opened one more stop farther to the east to Pennsylvania Avenue on December 24, 1920. At that date, only the southbound platform was used.

While work at this station and at New Lots Avenue was practically completed in 1921, they could not open yet because trains could not run to the terminal until track work, the signal tower, and the compressor room were in service. Work began on June 19, 1922, and this station opened on October 16, 1922, when shuttles started operating between Pennsylvania Avenue and New Lots Avenue. A two-car train operated on a single track on the northbound track. On October 31, 1924, through service to New Lots Avenue was begun.

From April 20, 2015, to March 28, 2016, this station and Rockaway Avenue were closed for renovations.

== Station layout ==
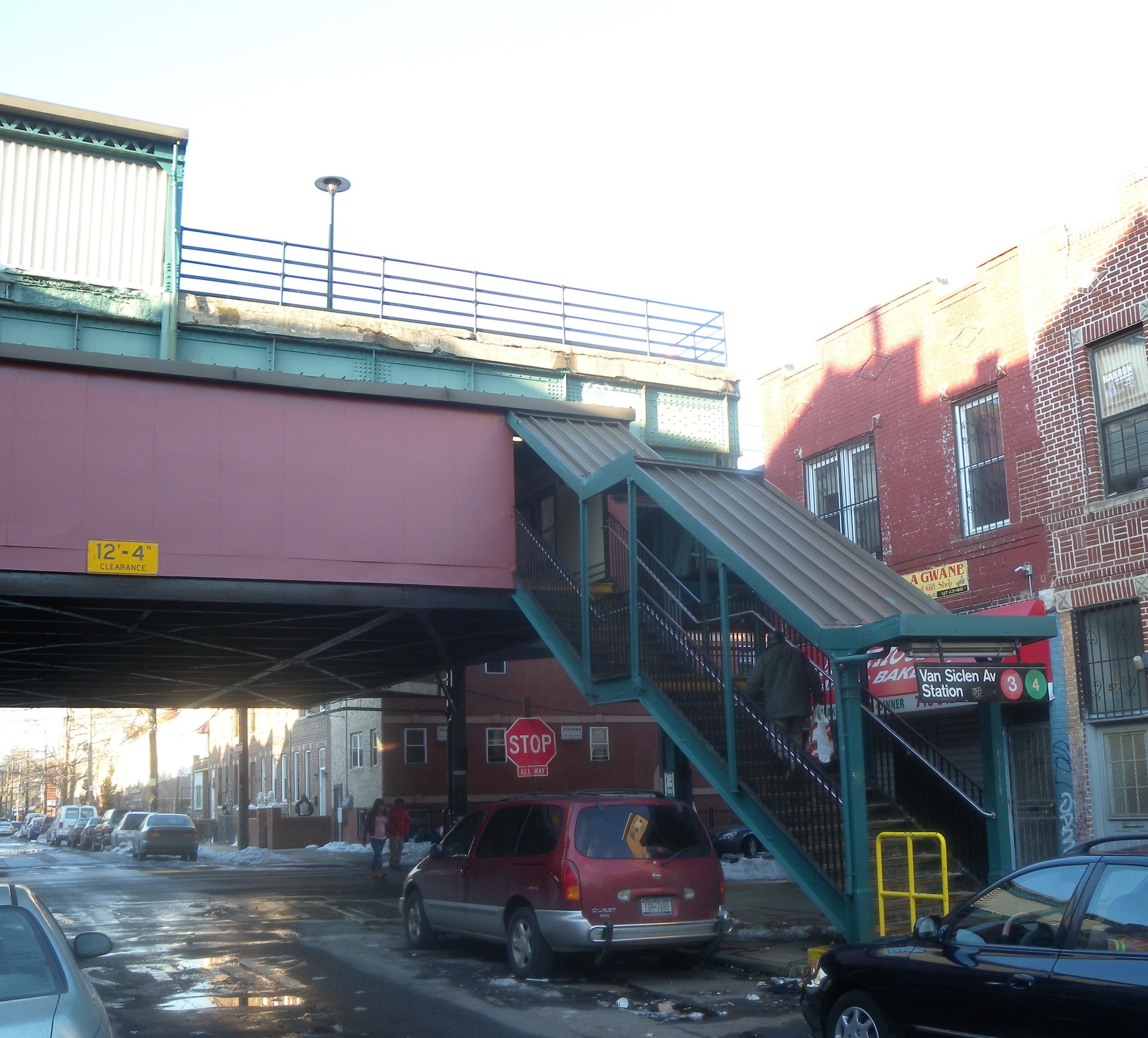
Entrance

This elevated station has two side platforms and two tracks with space for a center track that was never installed. The platforms are longer than a standard IRT train of 514 feet (157 m) and have beige windscreen and brown canopies with green support columns along their entire length except at their extreme ends. Here, they have waist-high, steel fences with lampposts at regular intervals. The station's signs are the standard black name plates with white Helvetica lettering.

=== Exits ===
The station's only mezzanine is an elevated headhouse below the platforms and tracks at the extreme east (railroad south) end. A single staircase from each platform goes down to a waiting area/crossover, where a turnstile bank provides access to and from the station. Outside fare control, there is a token booth and two staircases going down the northwest and southeast corners of Livonia Avenue and Van Siclen Avenue.
