= Livonia Avenue station =

New York City Subway station in Brooklyn

Livonia Avenue
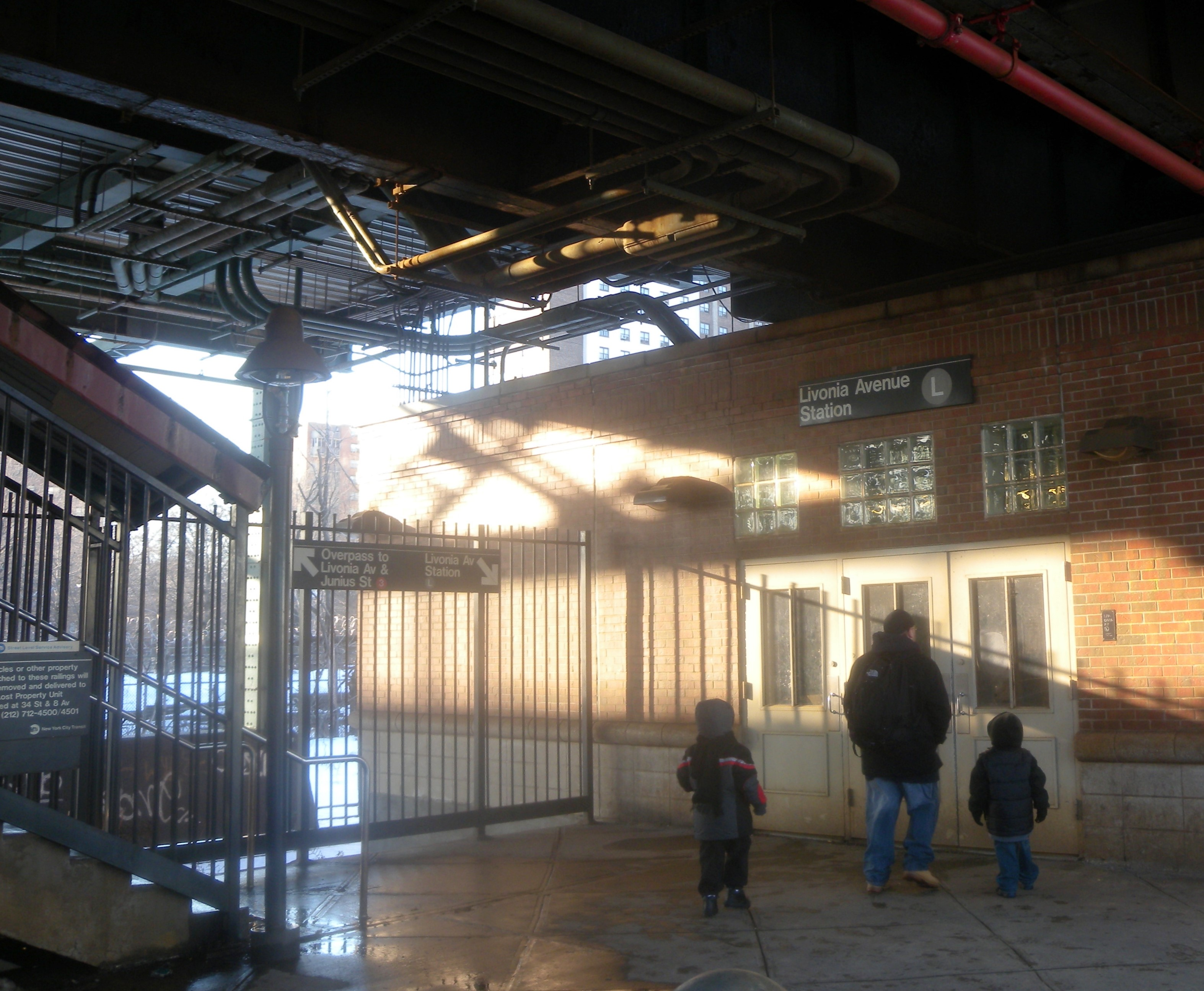
- Ground level entrance

Station statistics
- Address: Livonia Avenue & Van Sinderen Avenue; Brooklyn, New York
- Borough: Brooklyn
- Locale: Brownsville, East New York
- Coordinates: 40.663745°N 73.90048°W
- Division: B (BMT)
- Line: BMT Canarsie Line
- Services: L (all times)
- System transfers: Free out-of-system transfer with MetroCard or OMNY: 2 (limited rush hour service in the reverse-peak direction); 3 (all except late nights); 4 (late nights, and limited rush hour service in the peak direction); 5 (limited a.m. rush hour service in the northbound direction only) at Junius Street
- Structure: Elevated
- Platforms: 2 side platforms
- Tracks: 2

Other information
- Opened: May 15, 1911; 115 years ago
- Accessible: Yes

Traffic
- 2025: 646,319 ▲13.2%
- Rank: 366 out of 423
Services
Preceding station	New York City Subway	Following station
Sutter Avenue toward Eighth Avenue	L (New York City Subway service)	New Lots Avenue toward Canarsie–Rockaway Parkway
Location
Location within New York City Subway
Location within New York City
Location within New York
Track layout
Street map
Station service legend
Symbol	Description
Stops all times	Stops all times

The Livonia Avenue station (or Livonia Avenue-Junius Street station) is an elevated station on the BMT Canarsie Line of the New York City Subway. Located at the intersection of Livonia and Van Sinderen Avenues at the border of Brownsville and East New York, Brooklyn, it is served by the L train at all times. It opened on May 15, 1911, and is planned to be connected with the IRT New Lots Line's Junius Street station in the 2020s.

== History ==
The Livonia Avenue station opened on May 15, 1911, as an infill station after the line opened in 1906. Prior to its construction, the Board of Aldermen passed a resolution recommending that the Public Service Commission compel the Brooklyn Union Elevated Company to open a station at Livonia Avenue on the Canarsie line. The Commission initially refused to order the opening following an investigation. Commission Secretary Travis H. Whitney explained that until Livonia Avenue was opened across the railroad's right of way, a station would be mostly inaccessible. While the district west of the railroad was heavily populated, the area to the east was sparsely populated. The station was eventually completed by the B.R.T. To solve the earlier accessibility issues, the final structure included a bridged approach from the west. This dedicated bridge allowed passengers to completely avoid the dangerous grade crossing over the Long Island-New York connecting railroad tracks.

The station was renovated in 2005-2006 at a cost of $13.83 million. The 2007 artwork here is called Seasons by Philemona Williamson. It consists of stained glass windows on the platform windscreens depicted events related to the four seasons of meteorology.

Plans for the Interborough Express, a light rail line using the Bay Ridge Branch right of way, were announced in 2023. As part of the project, a light rail station at Livonia Avenue has been proposed next to the existing subway station.

=== Transfer with New Lots Line ===
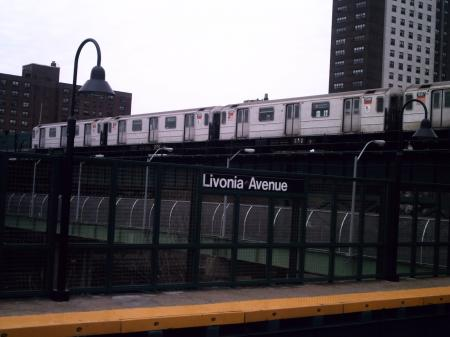
A New Lots Avenue-bound 3 train of R62s passing above Livonia Avenue after leaving Junius Street

The Canarsie Line passes under the IRT New Lots Line at the south end of the station. The IRT's station at Junius Street (served by the 34 train) is one block to the west of the BMT station. There is a free out-of-system transfer between the stations; passengers must leave one station and use a MetroCard or OMNY to enter the other station. The out-of-system transfer is made via an overpass running parallel to the New Lots Line, which allows pedestrians on Livonia Avenue to cross over the Long Island Rail Road's open-cut Bay Ridge Branch.

In 2015, there were proposals to convert the overpass to a free-transfer passage between the two stations due to increasing ridership and plans for additional housing in the area. Both stations would also have been upgraded to become compliant with mobility accessibility guidelines under the Americans with Disabilities Act of 1990. Money was allocated in the 2015–2019 Capital Program to build this transfer. However, in an April 2018 revision to the Capital Program, funding for the project, with the exception of funding already used to design the connection, was removed. Regardless, a free MetroCard and OMNY transfer between the two stations was provided during weekends and late nights as part of the reconstruction of the 14th Street Tunnel starting in April 2019; it was made permanent in February 2020.

The 2020–2024 Capital Program added back funding for the accessibility project, with an allocation of $38.4 million; by January 2020, only $400,000 of that amount had been spent on "pre-design" activities. In February 2020, the MTA awarded a design–build contract to construct the free transfer and associated elevator upgrades. By fall 2020, ADA improvements at the Livonia Avenue station were underway. The Rockaway Parkway-bound platform was temporarily closed for modifications on November 15, 2020 and reopened on March 9, 2021. The Manhattan-bound platform was temporarily closed for similar modifications on March 29, 2021 and reopened on July 14, 2021. The project to make the station accessible was completed on May 17, 2022, and the new elevators were officially opened in June 2022. By 2026, an overpass between the two stations, along with three elevators at the Junius Street station, was under construction and was expected to be completed later that year.

== Station layout ==
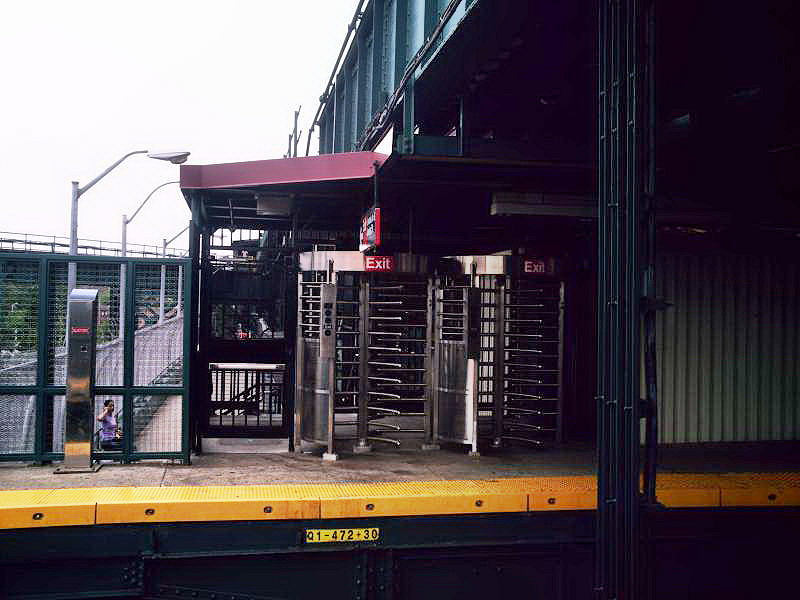
Unstaffed entrance on the Canarsie-bound platform

This elevated station has two side platforms and two tracks. Both platforms have beige windscreens and red canopies in their centers and barb wired fences at either ends. They are all supported by green frames.

Just south of this station is a spur branching off towards the Linden Shops & Yard. Another spur branches off of the IRT New Lots Line, which crosses over Livonia Avenue, and connects with track from the Canarsie Line before entering the yard. These spurs and the yard have no third rail and are used by New York City Transit diesel locomotives going to and from the facility.

=== Exits ===
The station's main entrance/exit is a ground-level station house directly underneath the platforms on the north side of the T-intersection of Van Sinderen and Livonia Avenues. It has a turnstile bank, token booth, and one staircase to each platform at the center. The Canarsie-bound platform has a secondary exit leading directly to the pedestrian bridge that contains two HEET turnstiles, an emergency gate, and a small staircase.

Right next to the station house is a pedestrian bridge that spans west above the adjacent and parallel Bay Ridge Branch of the Long Island Rail Road and leads to Junius Street, where the entrance to a station of the same name on the IRT New Lots Line is less than a block away.
