= IRT New Lots Line =

New York City Subway line

- The New Lots Line is served by the 3 train at all times except late nights, when the 4 train takes over service. Limited service is also provided by the 2, 4, and 5 trains during rush hours.

Overview
- Status: Operating
- Owner: City of New York
- Locale: Brooklyn
- Termini: Sutter Avenue–Rutland Road; New Lots Avenue
- Stations: 7

Service
- Type: Rapid transit
- System: New York City Subway
- Operator: New York City Transit Authority
- Daily ridership: 18,455

History
- Opened: November 23, 1920; 105 years ago
- Last extension: 1922

Technical
- Line length: 4.91 miles (7.90 km)
- Num of tracks: 2-3
- Character: Elevated
- Track gauge: 1,435 mm (4 ft 8 1/2 in) standard gauge
- Electrification: 600V DC third rail

The IRT New Lots Line or Livonia Avenue Line is a rapid transit line in the A Division of the New York City Subway. Located in the New York City borough of Brooklyn, the line runs from the Utica Avenue station in Crown Heights and continues to the New Lots Avenue station in East New York.

The New Lots Line is entirely elevated and consists of seven stations; most of the line has two tracks, except for Junius Street station, which has three tracks. It runs above Livonia Avenue in the, Brownsville and East New York neighborhoods, except for a short section above East 98th Street on the border with East Flatbush. The line is served by the 3 train at all times except late nights, when the 4 train takes over service. During rush hours, occasional 2, 4, and 5 trains also serve the line.

The New Lots Line was built as a part of Contract 3 of the Dual Contracts between New York City and the Interborough Rapid Transit Company. The first portion of the line between Utica Avenue and Junius Street opened on November 22, 1920, with shuttle trains operating over this route. The line opened one more stop farther to the east to Pennsylvania Avenue on December 24, 1920. Service was extended to New Lots Avenue on October 16, 1922. In 1968, as part of the proposed Program for Action, the IRT New Lots Line would have been extended past New Lots Avenue toward Spring Creek, but the plan was never completed. Stations on the line were rebuilt several times throughout the years.

== History ==
=== Planning ===
In 1913, New York City, the Brooklyn Rapid Transit Company, and the Interborough Rapid Transit Company (IRT) reached an agreement, known as the Dual Contracts, to drastically expand subway service across New York City. As part of Contract 3 of the agreement, between New York City and the IRT, the original subway opened by the IRT in 1904 to City Hall, and extended to Atlantic Avenue in 1908, was to be extended eastward into Brooklyn. The line was to be extended along Flatbush Avenue and Eastern Parkway to Buffalo Avenue as a four-track subway line, and then along East 98th Street and Livonia Avenue to New Lots Avenue as an elevated two-track line, with provisions for the addition of a third track. In addition, a two-track branch line along Nostrand Avenue branching off east of the Franklin Avenue station was to be constructed.

The underground portion of the line became known as the Eastern Parkway Line, or Route 12, while the elevated portion became known as the New Lots Line. This section was constructed as an elevated line because the ground in this area is right above the water table, and as a result the construction of a subway would have been prohibitively expensive. This line was constructed as Route 31, the Livonia Avenue Route. In 1914, several studies of the line had been completed. At the end of 1916, contract drawings for the line were completed, and the working drawings were being prepared. While preliminary studies for the construction of a yard along the line were completed, its locations were not yet decided upon. On April 16, 1916, the New York State Public Service Commission (PSC) denied a request by the Chief Engineer of the IRT for the installation of a third track on the line to provide necessary space for train storage. The request was turned down because it would have required the acquisition of additional steel and because the legal routing of Route 31 did not specify the construction of a third track along the line. On May 9, 1916, title was acquired to sixteen parcels of land between the intersection of Eastern Parkway and Buffalo Avenue and East New York Avenue opposite of East 98th Street in condemnation proceedings to complete the line.

=== Construction ===
Bids were opened for the construction of the line on May 23, 1916. Six bids on the project were received, and, on June 1, 1916, the contract was awarded to Dennis E. Conners, who submitted the low bid of $1,376,122. The high bid to build the line was for $1,467,000. Work on the project had to be completed by June 1, 1917. On June 5, the PSC accepted bids for 52,756 tons of structural steel to be used on multiple subway extensions to be completed as part of the Dual Contracts, of which 15,100 tons of the steel were for the Livonia Avenue extension. The PSC put this contract out to determine whether it was possible to let separate contracts for the steel by line, given that the price of steel was rapidly increasing. Three bids were submitted, but the Chief Engineer recommended that they all be rejected, because he anticipated that the price of steel would stop rising rapidly and instead start decreasing, and because the city had found a cheaper way to procure steel. On June 8, the award of the construction of the line to Conners was rescinded. Conners sent a letter to the PSC on June 20, agreeing to reduce his bid for steel by $20,000. The PSC subsequently rejected the three bids; it readvertised bids for the steel work and its erection, or just for the erection of the steel at the end of 1916.

A new contract for the construction of the line was awarded by the PSC on January 17, 1917, in two parts. The contract for the steel was awarded to American Bridge Company for $1,431,755, and the contract for the erection of the structure was awarded to W.G. Cooper for $257,164. The cost of these two contracts was $1,688,919, and work on the line had to be completed in fifteen months. Construction on the line began in spring 1917, and a quarter of the work that needed to be done before the erection of the steel was completed by September 1917. Work on the column footings for the elevated structure were completed by the end of the year.

Construction on the line was 17% complete at the end of Fiscal Year 1917, and was 25% complete at the end of Fiscal Year 1918. Drainage work on the line was 35% complete, and station work was underway at the end of Fiscal Year 1918. In August 1919, work on the line was suspended because W.G. Cooper broke his contract due to the high cost of material and labor. In February 1920, a contract for the unfinished portion of the line was awarded to George W. McNulty and the Holbrook, Cabot and Rollins Company. The contract for the completion of stations was awarded in July 1920, and was expected to take six months to complete. That month, it was announced that the line would not be ready to open for an additional eight months.

During 1919, the city purchased an area of land bounded by Hegeman and Lawrence Avenues, and Elton and Linwood Streets for the construction of a storage yard. Contracts for the yard were awarded in 1920. The yard was to be built with inspection facilities and the ability to store 250 cars.

=== Opening ===
The first portion of the line between Utica Avenue and Junius Street opened on November 22, 1920, with shuttle trains operating over this route. This extended service on the Eastern Parkway Line, which had opened from Atlantic Avenue to Utica Avenue on August 23, 1920. The New Lots Line opened one more stop farther to the east to Pennsylvania Avenue on December 24, 1920. At that date, only the southbound platform was used.

In 1921, the stations at Van Siclen Avenue and New Lots Avenue were practically completed, but they were not opened yet because trains could not run to the terminal until track work, the signal tower, and the compressor room were in service. On March 15, 1921, a contract for the completion of a signal tower to control train movements at the terminal crossovers at New Lots Avenue, and at the entrances to Livonia Yard, was submitted to the New York City Board of Estimate. On May 26, 1921, the contract for the installation of tracks in Livonia Yard was awarded to B.T. & J.J. Mack, and was sent to the Board of Estimate for approval. However, the contract was returned to the New York State Transit Commission (NYSTC) on August 2, 1921, because the contract did not receive the number of votes needed for approval. The contract was returned to the Board of Estimate on April 5, 1922, and was approved on April 28, 1922. The contract for the completion of the signal tower was rebid and was resubmitted to the Board of Estimate on May 15, 1922. On May 18, 1922, work began on the installation of tracks in Livonia Yard, and on June 9, 1922, the signal tower contract was approved. On June 19, 1922, work began on the tracks, signal tower and compressor room. The approach tracks needed for the operation of through service to New Lots Avenue were completed on July 18, 1922.

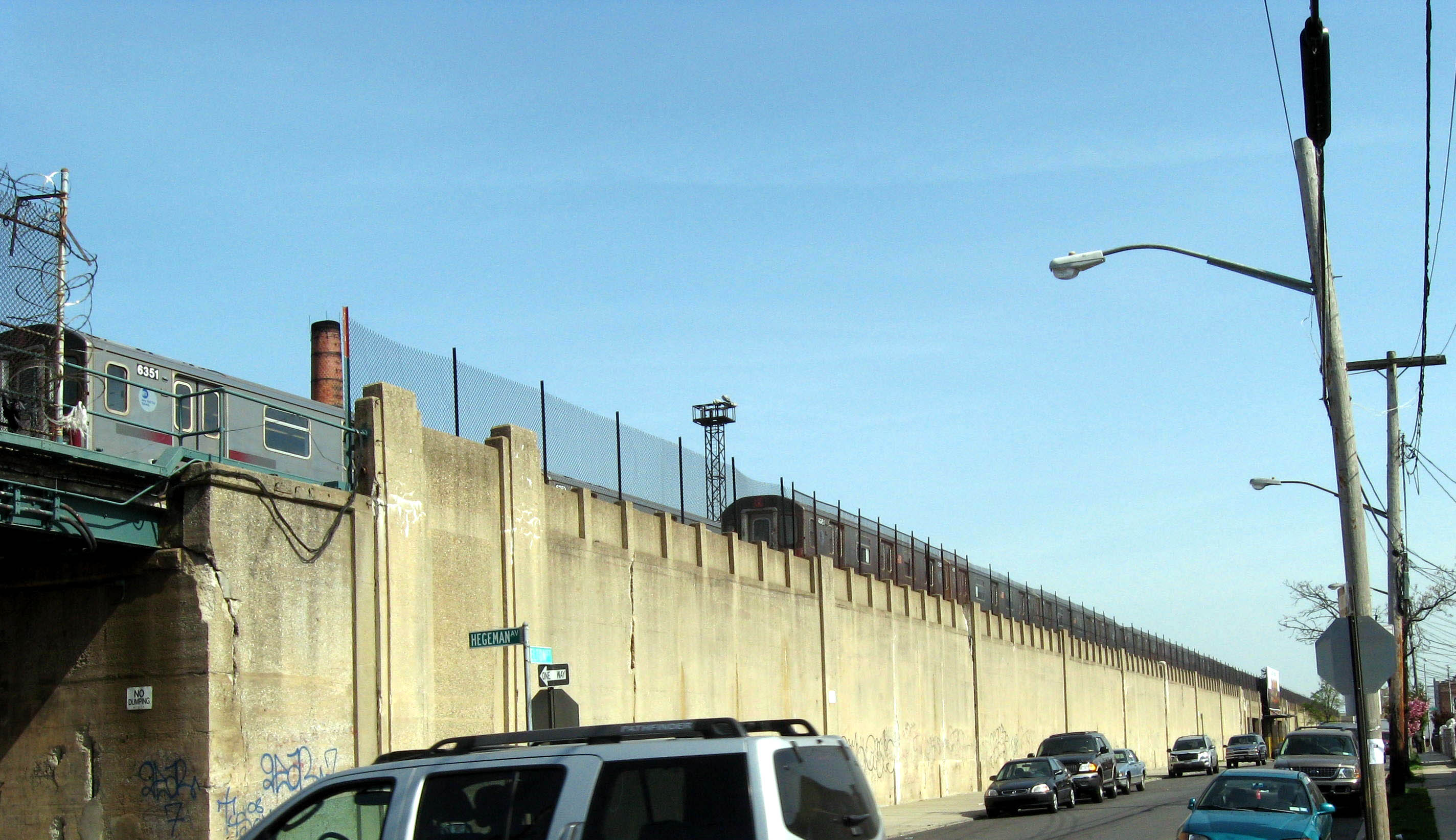
View of the northwest corner of Livonia Yard. An R142 2 train awaits service.

Shuttles started operating between Pennsylvania Avenue and New Lots Avenue on October 16, 1922, with a two-car train operating back and forth along on the northbound track. Trains ran every eight minutes during rush hours, and ten minutes during middays, and made close connections with main line service at Pennsylvania Avenue. The implementation of shuttle service was done at the request of the NYSTC, which urged the IRT to start service as soon as it could safely be operated. Though work on the tower was not yet finished at the time, enough was completed to allow for the shuttle service. The use of shuttle service accelerated the opening of this portion of the line by a month, when through service was estimated to be inaugurated with the completion of the tower. Work on Livonia Yard was completed on December 31, 1922, and the yard was opened for service on July 28, 1923. On October 31, 1924, through service to New Lots Avenue was begun.

Until January 23, 1928, it was custom to split full-length trains from Van Cortlandt Park (later labeled 1 trains) at Eastern Parkway–Brooklyn Museum on the IRT Eastern Parkway Line. The back half of each train would travel to Flatbush Avenue–Brooklyn College on the IRT Nostrand Avenue Line, and the front half would travel to New Lots Avenue on the New Lots Avenue Line. This sometimes caused disputes when customers did not realize that the different portions of each train would go to different destinations. With the change in service, West Farms trains (later labeled 2 trains) were extended from Atlantic Avenue to Flatbush Avenue, and all Van Cortlandt Park trains were extended to New Lots Avenue. In July 1937, the line became fully signaled for the first time.

=== Expansion plans ===
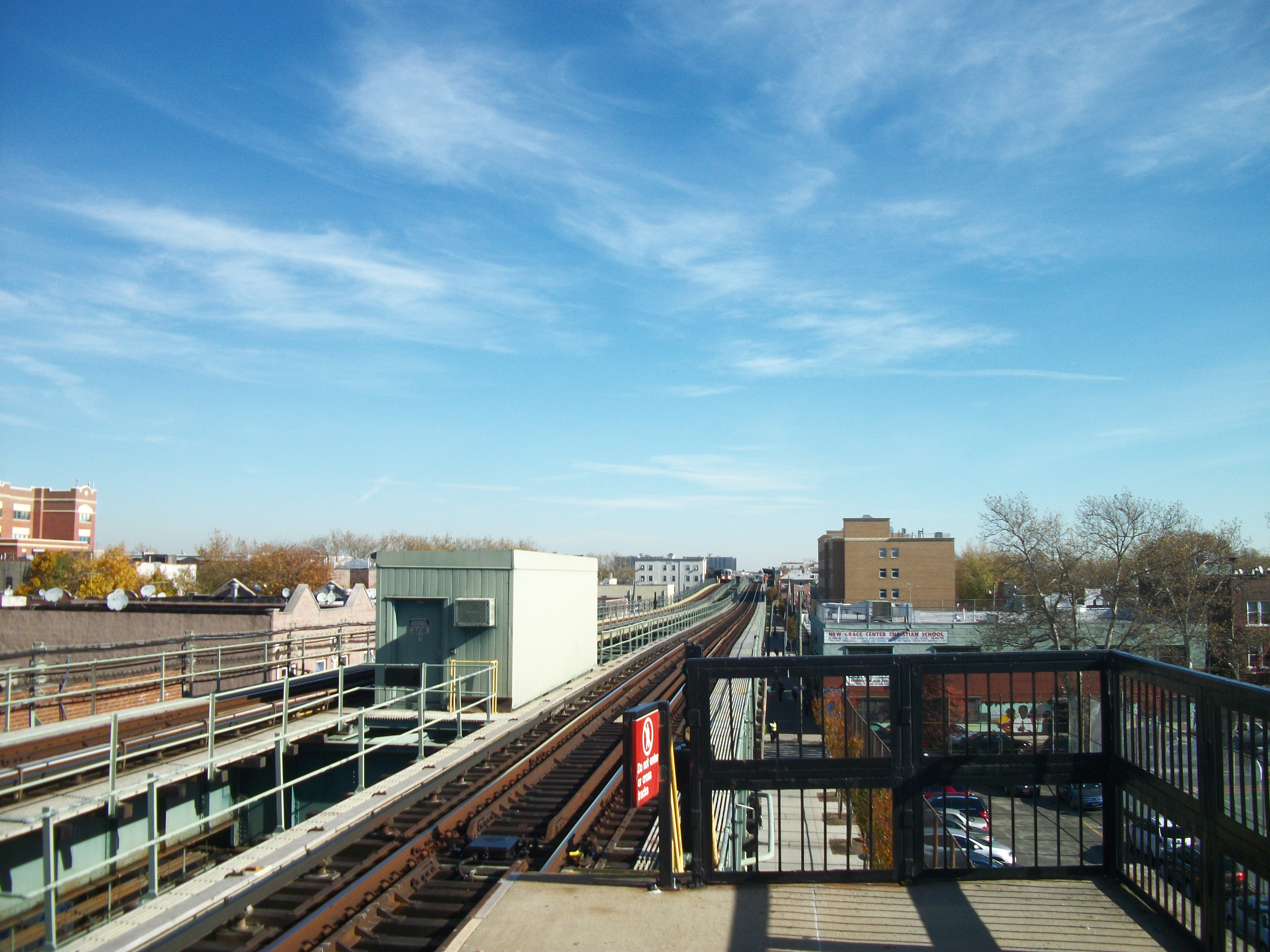
A view of the New Lots Line looking east from the Pennsylvania Avenue station showing the line's unused center trackway, with a building constructed on top of it.

On March 1, 1951, the New York City Board of Transportation announced that it would conduct an engineering study for the construction of a third track between Utica Avenue and New Lots Avenue using the unused trackbed in the center of the elevated structure.

In 1961, work to extend the platforms at stations along the line to accommodate ten-car trains was completed. As part of an 18-month capital budget that took effect on January 1, 1963, the New Lots Avenue station was reconstructed.

In 1968, as part of the proposed Program for Action, the IRT New Lots Line in East New York, would be extended southerly through the Livonia Yard to Flatlands Avenue to a modern terminal at Flatlands Avenue and Linwood Street. This two-track line would have run at ground level and it would have provided better access to the then-growing community of Spring Creek. This extension would have been completed at the cost of $12 million. The extension was canceled in the mid-1970s, largely due to the city's fiscal crisis at the time. As of 2022, a potential extension of the IRT New Lots Line through Livonia Yard is being evaluated as part of the 2025–2044 20-Year Needs Assessment.

=== Service changes ===
2 and 3 trains kept on switching their southern terminals until July 10, 1983, when 2 trains began terminating at Flatbush Avenue and 3 trains began terminating at New Lots Avenue. In addition, rush hour 4 trains were rerouted from Flatbush Avenue to Utica Avenue, and late evening and late night service was rerouted from Flatbush Avenue to New Lots Avenue. 5 trains were rerouted from Utica Avenue to Flatbush Avenue during rush hours. These changes were made to reduce non-revenue subway car mileage, to provide a dedicated fleet for each service, and to provide an easily accessible inspection yard for each service. The change allowed the 2 to be dedicated to 239th Street Yard and allowed the 3 to be assigned to Livonia Yard. With the rerouting of 3 trains, train lengths along the New Lots Line were reduced from 10 cars to 9 cars, within acceptable crowding levels, and train lengths along the Nostrand Avenue Line were increased from 9 to 10 cars, reducing crowding. 4 trains were added on December 20, 1946, and 5 trains were gradually added between 1938 and 1950.

=== Station renovations ===
In 1975, the New York City Transit Authority (NYCTA) applied for a Mass Transportation Facilities Grant Application from the United States Department of Transportation (USDOT) to fund four improvement projects, including the replacement of wooden platforms with concrete platforms at Rockaway Avenue, Junius Street, Pennsylvania Avenue, and Van Siclen Avenue. This project was estimated to cost $1,451,000. The four projects part of this application, combined, were estimated to cost $13,801,000, with $9,661,000 to be funded by the grant, which the city requested to be reallocated from funding for urban highways. The remainder was to be funded from New York City and New York State. The grant request was approved by the USDOT, and NYCTA invited contractors to bid on the platform replacement project in November 1976.

From 2000 to August 2001, 3 train service was split into two sections to allow for the line to be rebuilt, with transfers available at Utica Avenue. Work took place on weekday middays between 10 a.m. and 3 p.m., and service operated in one of three ways: shuttle buses replaced trains, all trains operated in both directions on a single track, or shuttle trains ran. 4 trains terminated at Atlantic Avenue when shuttle or single-track trains were in operation.

As part of the Metropolitan Transportation Authority (MTA)'s 2010–2014 Capital Program, funding was provided for a 25-station Station Renewal program, which focused on renovating stations with a high concentration of components rated 3.5 or worse on a five-point scale, with 5 being the highest. All of the stations on the line, except for New Lots Avenue, were among the priority candidates to be among the 25 stations selected for the program. Between 41% and 58% of components at these six stations were rated 3.5 or worse. A $45.7 million contract was awarded to renovate the line's seven stations in 2014. The project was completed between January 2015 and October 2017. As part of the project, station drainage, doors, windows, railings, platform rubbing boards, structural steel, panels and signage were replaced. In addition, detectable warning strips, bird deterrent systems, track lubrication systems and artwork were installed. The project was completed in four phases, and each phase was supposed to take five months. For the first phase, the Van Siclen Avenue and Rockaway Avenue stations were closed from April 20, 2015, to March 28, 2016. Next, from April 11, 2016, until September 19, 2016, the Saratoga Avenue and Pennsylvania Avenue stations were closed for renovation. The Pennsylvania Avenue station was closed once again from October 27, 2016, to March 3, 2017, due to a truck accident which damaged the station's mezzanine. In the third phase, Junius Street and Sutter Avenue–Rutland Road stations were closed for renovations from October 5, 2016, to June 19, 2017. In the fourth phase, which occurred simultaneously with the other phases, the New Lots Avenue station was renovated without being closed from December 2014 to December 2017. The fare control area at New Lots Avenue was reconfigured.

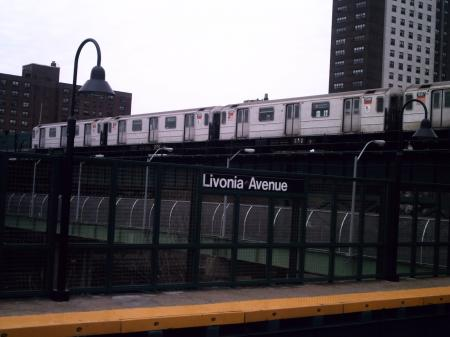
Crossing over BMT Canarsie Line.

Funding for the construction of a free transfer between the Junius Street station and the nearby Livonia Avenue station on the BMT Canarsie Line, which is directly to the east of the station, was included in the 2015–2019 MTA Capital Program. Passengers can transfer between the two stations for free by using an overpass running parallel to the New Lots Line, which allows pedestrians on Livonia Avenue to cross over the Long Island Rail Road's open-cut Bay Ridge Branch, and using a MetroCard or OMNY. At the request of Brooklyn Borough President Eric Adams, and due to increasing ridership and plans for additional housing in the area, funding was provided to build the free transfer. In addition, both stations would also have been upgraded to become compliant with mobility accessibility guidelines under the Americans with Disabilities Act of 1990. However, in the April 2018 revision to the Capital Program, funding for the project, with the exception of funding already used to design the connection, was removed. A free MetroCard-only transfer between the two stations was provided during weekends and late nights as part of the reconstruction of the 14th Street Tunnel starting in April 2019. Funding for the free transfer connection was added back in the 2020–2024 Capital Program. In February 2020, the out-of-system transfer was made permanent until the in-system transfer was completed.

== Extent and service ==
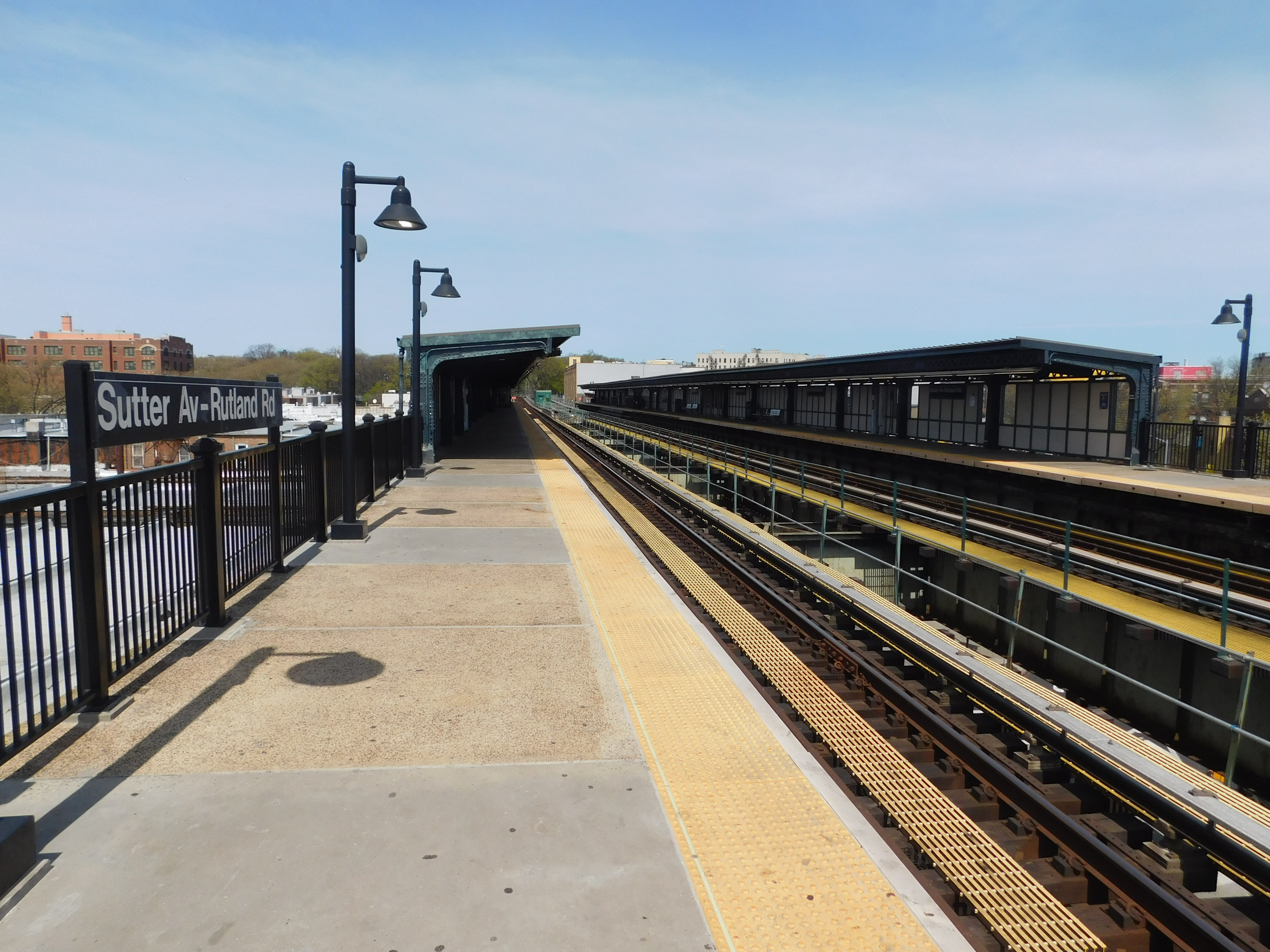
Sutter Avenue–Rutland Road station

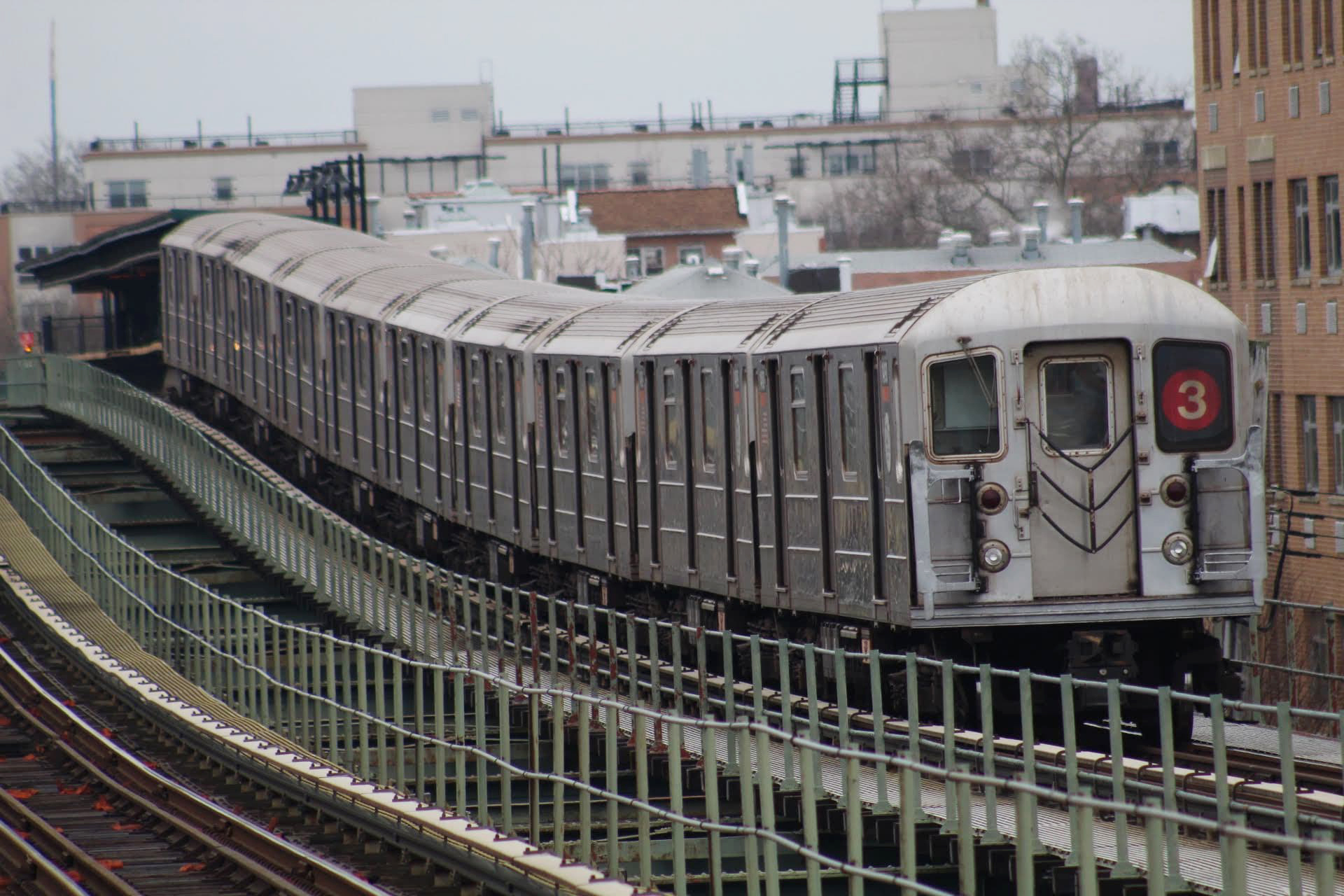
New Lots Avenue-bound 3 train approaching Van Siclen Avenue.

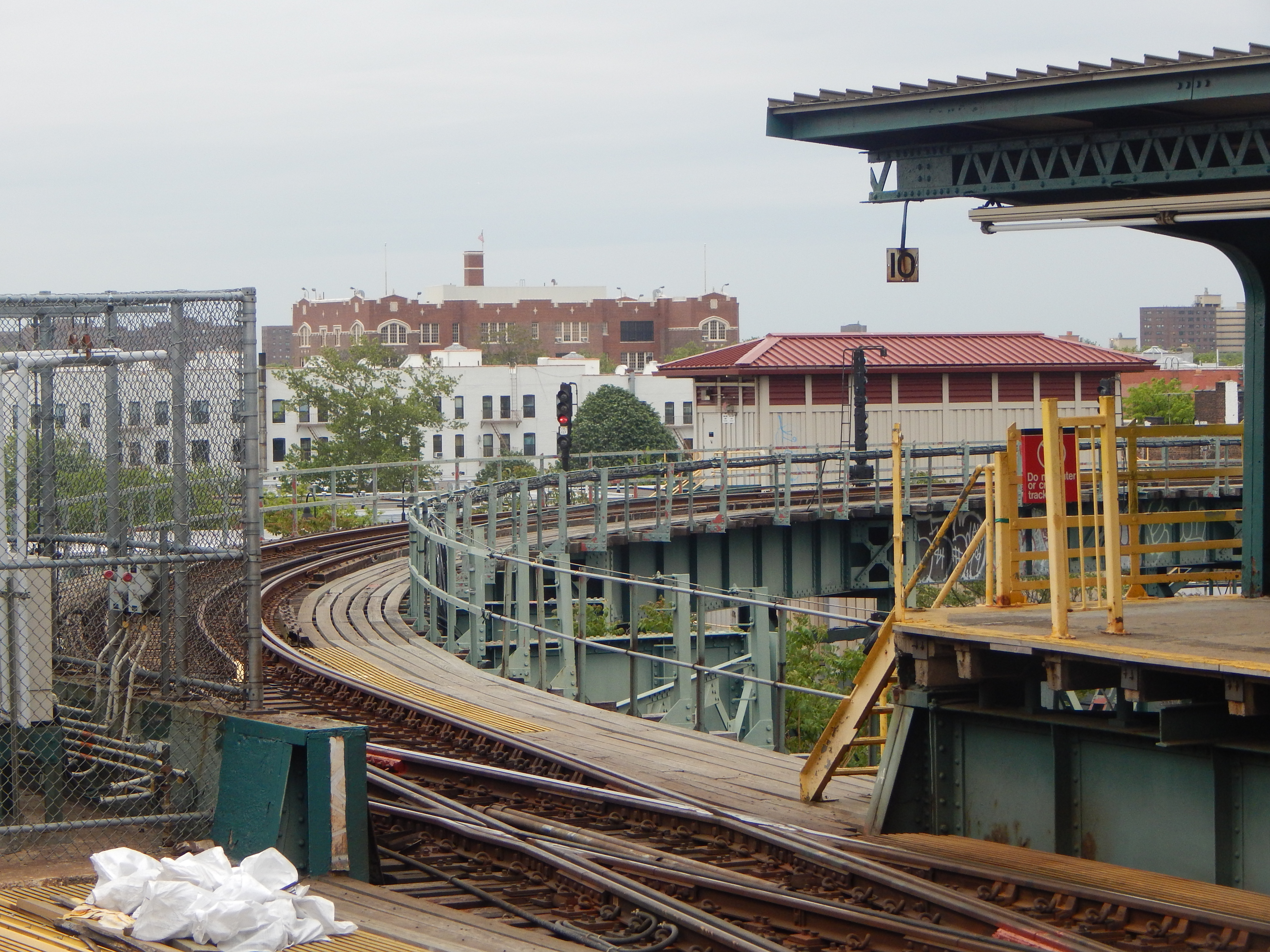
A view of the switch connecting the New Lots Line to Linden Yard east of the Junius Street station.

The following services use part or all of the IRT New Lots Line:

| | Time period | | |
| | rush hours | middays, evenings, and weekends | late nights |
|---|---|---|---|
| "2" train | limited service | no service | |
| "3" train | service | | no service |
| "4" train | limited service | no service | service |
| "5" train | limited service | no service | |

The line is served by the 3 train at all times except late nights, when the 4 train takes over service. Some rush hour 2 and 5 trains also run on this line because of capacity issues at their usual terminal at Flatbush Avenue–Brooklyn College on the IRT Nostrand Avenue Line.

=== Route description ===
The New Lots Line is the only elevated structure on the Brooklyn IRT. The line begins just east of Utica Avenue in Crown Heights, branching off from the IRT Eastern Parkway Line near Buffalo Avenue. The line then emerges from a tunnel on the southeast corner along the eastern edge of Lincoln Terrace Park, the IRT New Lots Line then crosses a bridge over East New York Avenue and then runs over East 98th Street with only one station, until it approaches the intersection with Livonia Avenue, where the line curves over that avenue and continues as such until its terminus. Right after Junius Street station, Livonia Avenue is bisected by the Long Island Rail Road Bay Ridge Branch as well as the Linden Shops, both of which run between Junius Street and Van Sinderen Avenue, the latter of which is flanked by the BMT Canarsie Line, also an elevated line, but runs underneath the New Lots Line. The last station on the line is New Lots Avenue, which is actually two blocks west of its namesake street, where Livonia Avenue ends. The New Lots Line crosses over New Lots Avenue and then Elton Street, curving to the south and terminating within the Livonia Yard. There is a provision for a future extension from New Lots Avenue in the elevated structure at Linwood Avenue. The line includes an unused center trackway, built as a provision for a third track. On the roof of the mezzanines at each station are cross ties but no rails. In some areas, the space is used for mechanical and signal rooms. A center track exists only at Junius Street, where it crosses the southbound track at grade towards the Linden Shops. This un-electrified track is one of only two connections to the national rail system. The BMT West End Line is the other connection, via the New York Connecting Railroad; the Linden Shops are connected to the Long Island Rail Road and from there to the rest of the national network.

== Station listing ==
Station service legend
| Stops all times except late nights | Stops every day during daytime hours only |
| Stops late nights only | Stops every day during overnight hours only |
| Stops rush hours in the peak direction only | Stops during weekday rush hours in the peak direction only |
| Stops rush hours in the reverse-peak direction only | Stops during weekday rush hours in the reverse peak direction only |
Time period details
| Disabled access | Station is compliant with the Americans with Disabilities Act |
| ↑ | Station is compliant with the Americans with Disabilities Act in the indicated direction only |
| ↓ | Station is compliant with the Americans with Disabilities Act in the indicated direction only |
| | Elevator access to mezzanine only |

| Neighborhood (approximate) | Disabled access | Station | Services | Opened | Transfers and notes |
Begins as continuation of IRT Eastern Parkway Line local tracks (2 3 4 5 )
| Brownsville | | Sutter Avenue–Rutland Road | 2 3 4 5 | November 22, 1920 | B15 bus to JFK Airport |
| Brownsville | | Saratoga Avenue | 2 3 4 5 | November 22, 1920 | |
| Brownsville | | Rockaway Avenue | 2 3 4 5 | November 22, 1920 | |
| Brownsville | | Junius Street | 2 3 4 5 | November 22, 1920 | MetroCard/OMNY transfer to BMT Canarsie Line (L ) at Livonia Avenue |
connecting track to Linden Shops (non-electrified)
| East New York | | Pennsylvania Avenue | 2 3 4 5 | December 24, 1920 | |
| East New York | | Van Siclen Avenue | 2 3 4 5 | October 16, 1922 | |
| East New York | | New Lots Avenue | 2 3 4 5 | October 16, 1922 | B15 bus to JFK Airport |
| East New York | Terminus of all service | | | | |
| East New York | Connecting tracks to Livonia Yard | | | | |
