= Junius Street station =

New York City Subway station in Brooklyn

Junius Street
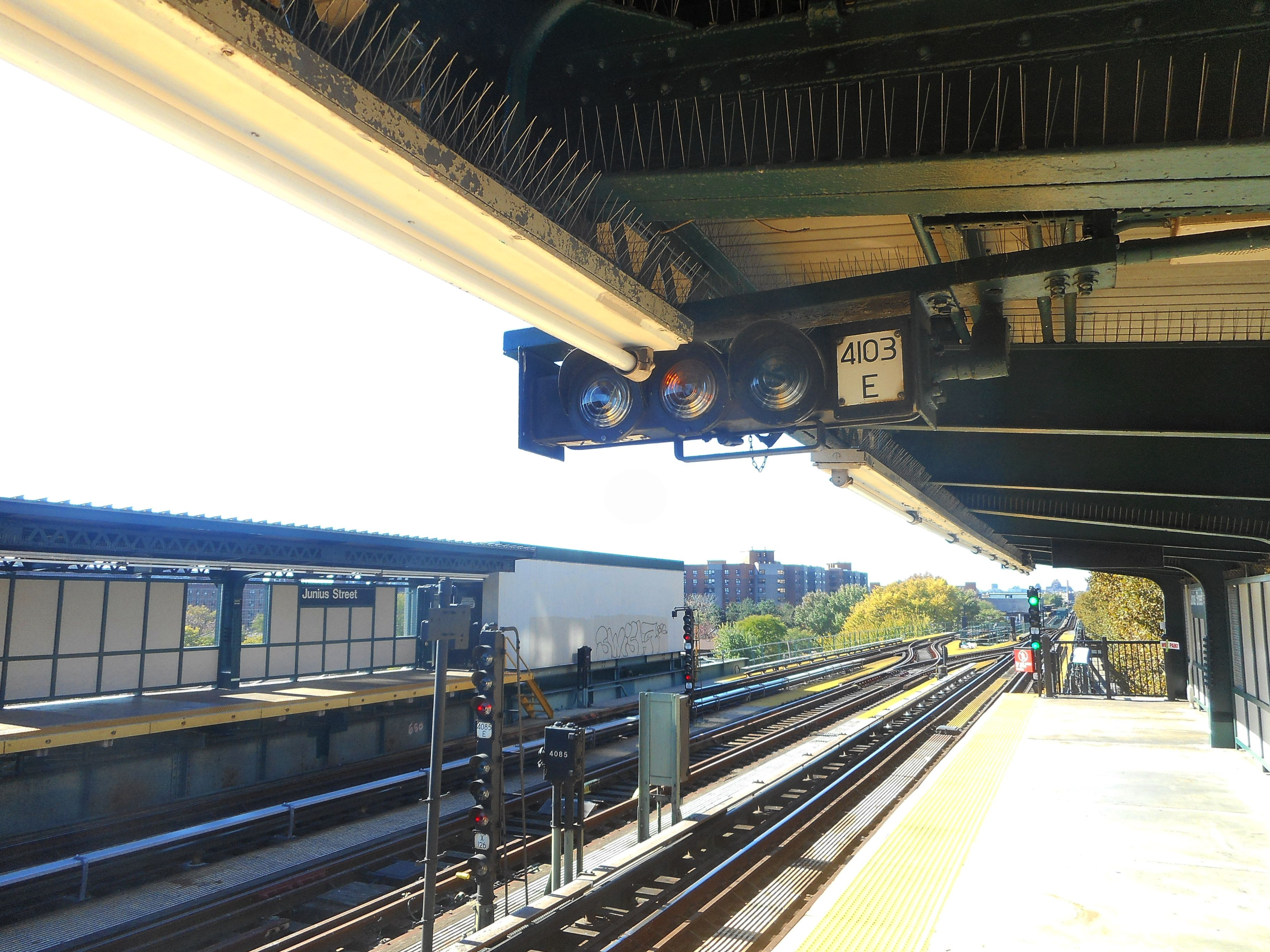

Station statistics
- Address: Junius Street & Livonia Avenue; Brooklyn, New York
- Borough: Brooklyn
- Locale: Brownsville
- Coordinates: 40.663615°N 73.90151°W
- Division: A (IRT)
- Line: IRT New Lots Line
- Services: 2 (limited rush hour service in the reverse-peak direction); 3 (all except late nights); 4 (late nights, and limited rush hour service in the peak direction); 5 (limited a.m. rush hour service in the northbound direction only)
- System transfers: Free out-of-system transfer with MetroCard or OMNY: L (all times) at Livonia Avenue
- Transit: NYCT Bus: B14
- Structure: Elevated
- Platforms: 2 side platforms
- Tracks: 3 (1 not for passenger service)

Other information
- Opened: November 22, 1920; 105 years ago
- Rebuilt: October 5, 2016; 10 years ago to June 19, 2017; 9 years ago
- Accessible: No; under construction

Traffic
- 2025: 553,747 ▲11.9%
- Rank: 384 out of 423
Services
Preceding station	New York City Subway	Following station
Rockaway Avenue 2 3 4 5 Harlem–148th Street or Woodlawn	3 (New York City Subway service) 4 (New York City Subway service)	Pennsylvania Avenue 2 3 4 New Lots Avenue
Location
Location within New York City Subway
Location within New York City
Location within New York
Track layout
Street map
Station service legend
Symbol	Description
Stops all times	Stops all times
Stops late nights only	Stops late nights only
Stops late nights and weekends	Stops late nights and weekends
Stops rush hours only	Stops rush hours only
Stops rush hours in the peak direction only	Stops rush hours in the peak direction only
Stops weekdays during the day	Stops weekdays during the day

The Junius Street station is a station on the IRT New Lots Line of the New York City Subway. Located at the intersection of Junius Street and Livonia Avenue in Brownsville, Brooklyn, it is served by the 3 train at all times except late nights, when the 4 train takes over service. During rush hours, occasional 2, 4 and 5 trains also stop here.

== History ==
The New Lots Line was built as a part of Contract 3 of the Dual Contracts between New York City and the Interborough Rapid Transit Company, including this station. It was built as an elevated line because the ground in this area is right above the water table, and as a result the construction of a subway would have been prohibitively expensive. This station opened along with the first portion of the line from Utica Avenue on November 22, 1920, with shuttle trains operating over this route. This station ceased to be the line's terminal when the line opened one more stop farther to the east to Pennsylvania Avenue on December 24, 1920, using its southbound platform. The line was completed to New Lots Avenue on October 16, 1922, with a two-car train running on the northbound track. On October 31, 1924, through service to New Lots Avenue was begun.

From October 5, 2016, to June 19, 2017, this station and Sutter Avenue–Rutland Road were closed for renovations.

=== Transfer with Canarsie Line ===
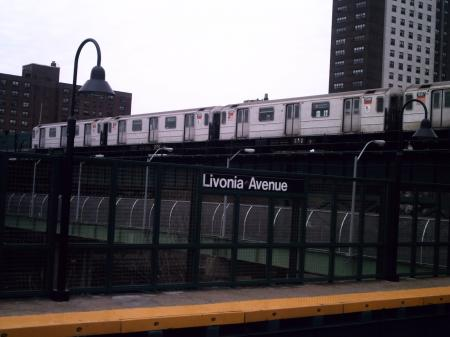
A New Lots Avenue-bound 3 train of R62s passing above Livonia Avenue after leaving Junius Street.

The New Lots Line passes over the Livonia Avenue station on the BMT Canarsie Line (L train) directly to the east of this station. There is a free out-of-system transfer between the stations; passengers must leave one station and use a MetroCard or OMNY to enter the other station. The out-of-system transfer is made via an overpass running parallel to the New Lots Line, which allows pedestrians on Livonia Avenue to cross over the Long Island Rail Road's open-cut Bay Ridge Branch.

In 2015, there were proposals to convert the overpass into a free-transfer passage between the two stations, due to increasing ridership and plans for additional housing in the area. Money was allocated in the 2015–2019 Capital Program to build this transfer. Both stations would also have been upgraded to become compliant with mobility accessibility guidelines under the Americans with Disabilities Act of 1990. However, in the April 2018 revision to the Capital Program, funding for the project, with the exception of funding already used to design the connection, was removed. A free MetroCard-only transfer between the two stations was also provided during weekends and late nights as part of the reconstruction of the 14th Street Tunnel starting in April 2019 and introduced permanently in February 2020. The 2020–2024 Capital Program added back funding for the project, with an allocation of $38.4 million; by January 2020, only $400,000 of that amount had been spent on "pre-design" activities. In February 2020, the MTA awarded a design–build contract to construct the free transfer and associated elevator upgrades. In November 2022, the MTA announced that it would award a $965 million contract for the installation of 21 elevators across eight stations, including Junius Street. A joint venture of ASTM and Halmar International would construct the elevators under a public-private partnership. By 2026, an overpass between the two stations, along with three elevators at the Junius Street station, was under construction and was expected to be completed later that year.

== Station layout ==
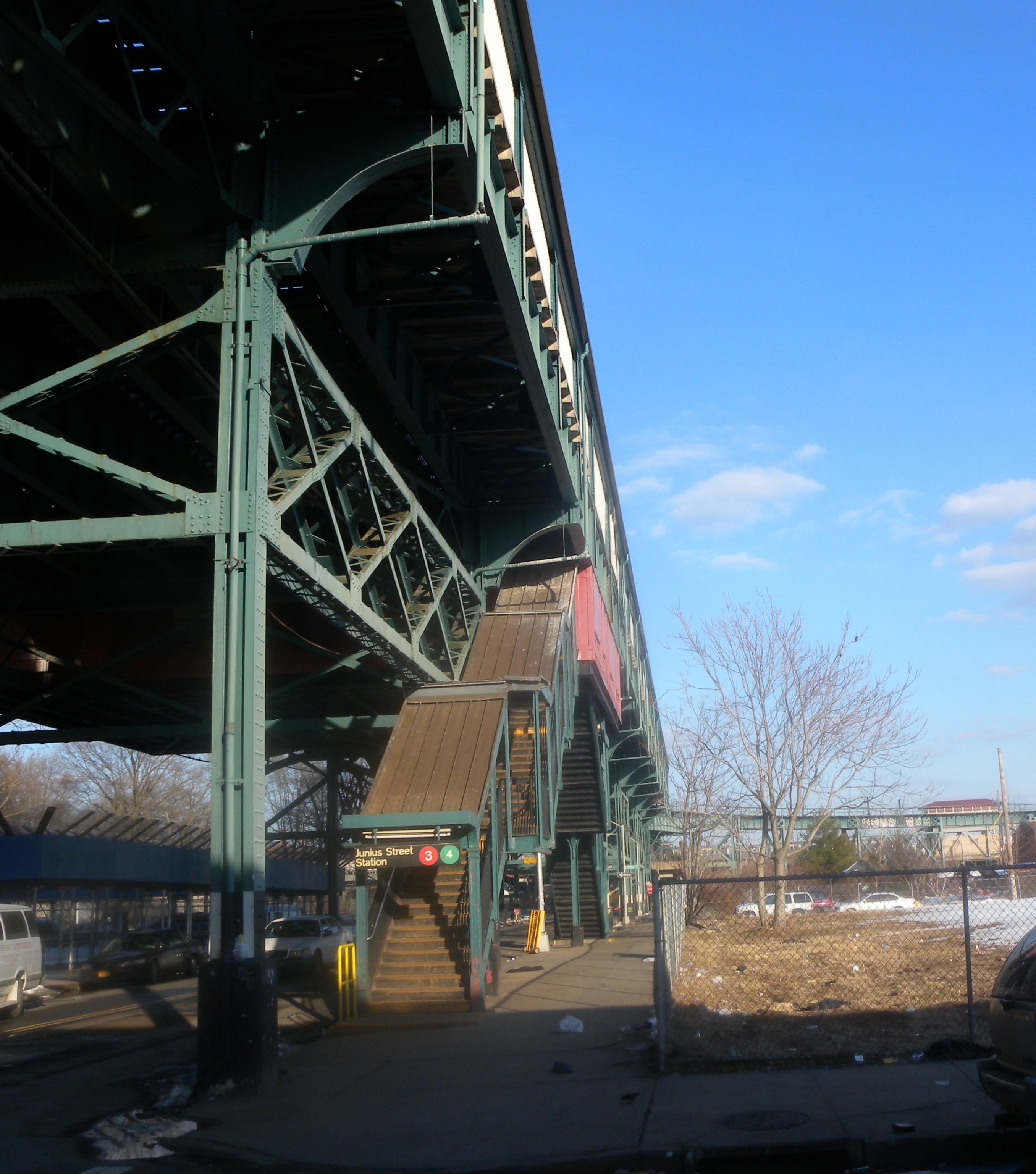
Entrance

There are two side platforms and three tracks. It is the only station on the line with a center track, which was installed sometime before 1987. However, it does not have a third rail and thus can only be used by diesel trains or other non-electric equipment. Just west (railroad north) of the station, tracks split from both the northbound and southbound tracks, merging to form the center track; this goes through the station and turns south, crossing the southbound track at grade. The track joins with one from the BMT Canarsie Line (below the station) and heads to the Linden Shops. Both platforms have beige windscreens and green canopies that run for the entire length.

East of this station, the New Lots Line passes over the BMT Canarsie Line. At Junius Street, a block from the station entrance, an overpass running parallel to the New Lots Line allows pedestrians on Livonia Avenue to cross over the Long Island Rail Road's open-cut Bay Ridge Branch. This overpass leads to the main entrance of the Livonia Avenue station on the BMT Canarsie Line.

=== Exits ===
The two street stairs to the station's only mezzanine are a block away on the south side of Livonia Avenue between Powell and Sackman Streets. The small, elevated mezzanine/station house beneath the tracks has a token booth, turnstile bank, and two staircases to the center of each of the two side platforms.

Despite the station name, there are currently no actual entrances to this station on Junius Street; a mezzanine over Junius Street was closed many years ago, and stairs to the street were subsequently removed. However, as part of the accessibility upgrades and construction of the free transfer to Livonia Avenue station, the mezzanine over Junius Street is currently being rebuilt with elevator access, once again providing direct access to/from the namesake street.
