= New Lots Avenue station (IRT New Lots Line) =

New York City Subway station in Brooklyn

New Lots Avenue
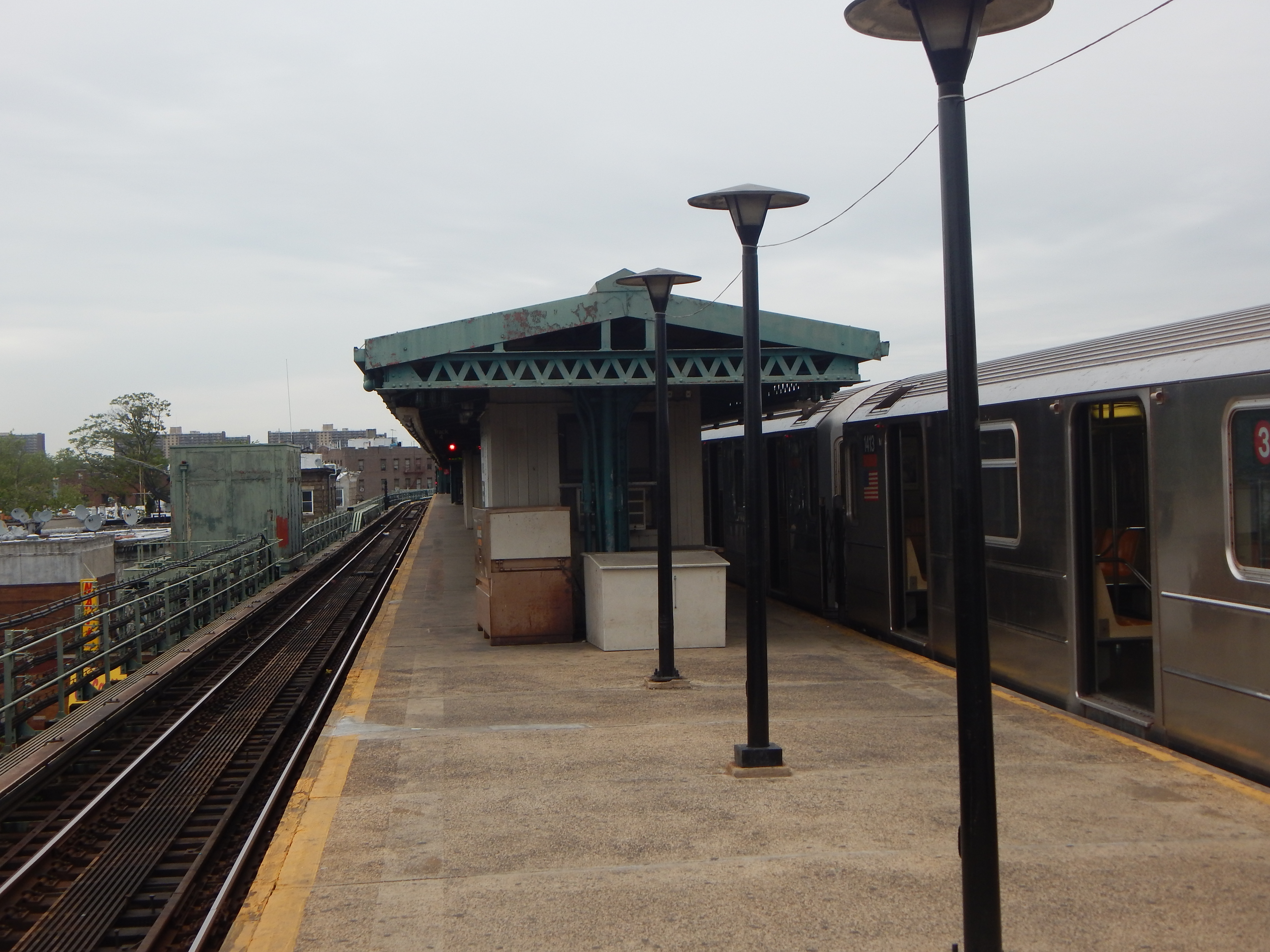
- Station platform in May 2015

Station statistics
- Address: New Lots Avenue & Livonia Avenue; Brooklyn, New York
- Borough: Brooklyn
- Locale: East New York
- Coordinates: 40.666382°N 73.882585°W
- Division: A (IRT)
- Line: IRT New Lots Line
- Services: 2 (limited rush hour service in the reverse-peak direction); 3 (all except late nights); 4 (late nights, and limited rush hour service in the peak direction); 5 (limited a.m. rush hour service in the northbound direction only)
- Transit: NYCT Bus: B6, B15, B84
- Structure: Elevated
- Platforms: 1 island platform
- Tracks: 2

Other information
- Opened: October 16, 1922; 104 years ago
- Accessible: No; under construction

Traffic
- 2025: 1,072,117 ▲7.6%
- Rank: 296 out of 423
Services
Preceding station	New York City Subway	Following station
Van Siclen Avenue 2 3 4 5 Harlem–148th Street or Woodlawn	3 (New York City Subway service) 4 (New York City Subway service)	Terminus
Location
Location within New York City Subway
Location within New York City
Location within New York
Track layout
Street map
Station service legend
Symbol	Description
Stops all times	Stops all times
Stops late nights only	Stops late nights only
Stops late nights and weekends	Stops late nights and weekends
Stops rush hours only	Stops rush hours only
Stops rush hours in the peak direction only	Stops rush hours in the peak direction only
Stops weekdays during the day	Stops weekdays during the day

The New Lots Avenue station is the eastern terminal of the IRT New Lots Line of the New York City Subway. Located in East New York, Brooklyn, it is the railroad southern terminal for the 3 train at all times except late nights, when the 4 train takes over service. During rush hours, occasional 2, 4, and 5 trains also stop here.

== History ==
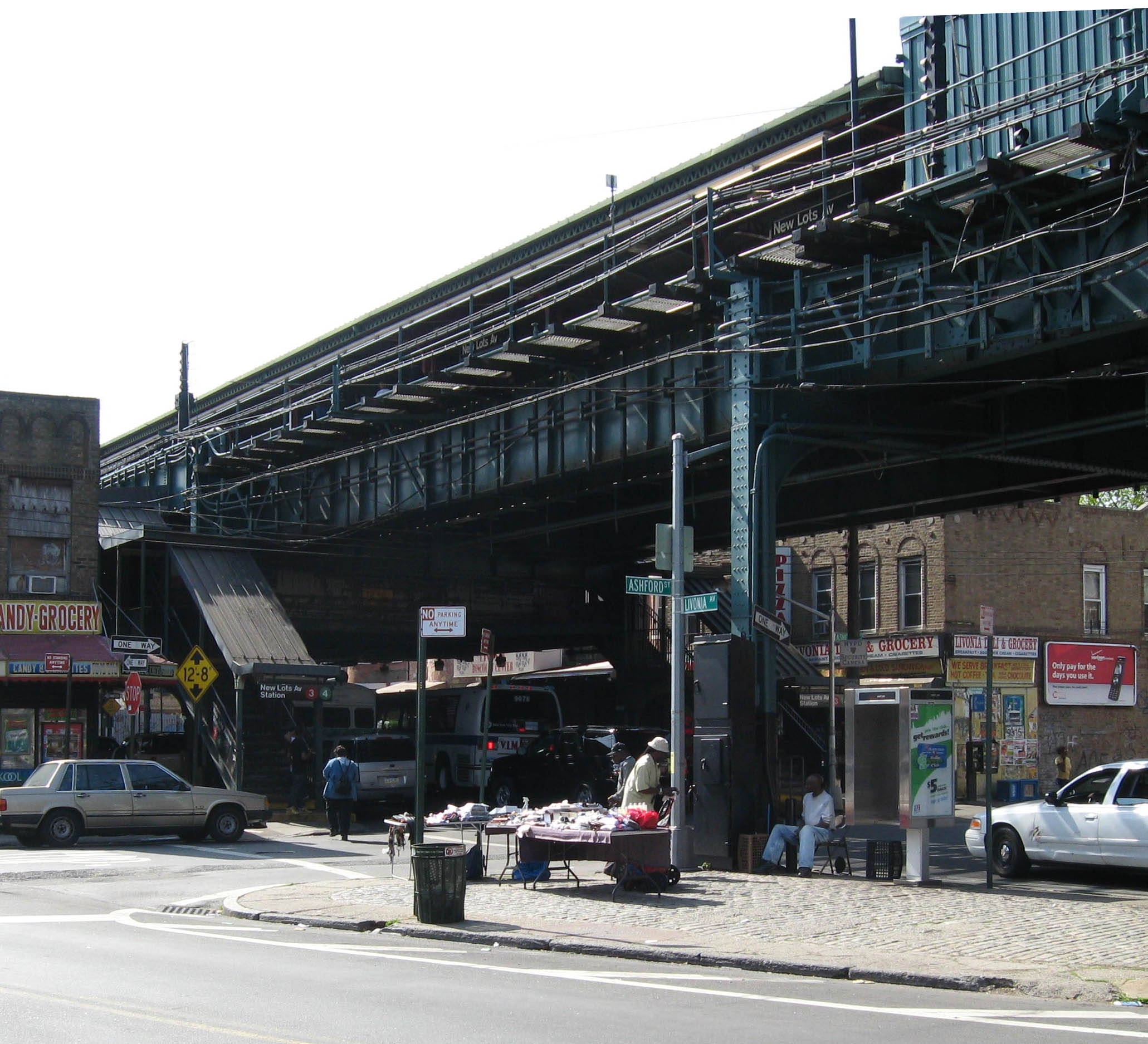
Street entrance

The New Lots Line was built as a part of Contract 3 of the Dual Contracts between New York City and the Interborough Rapid Transit Company, including the New Lots Avenue station. It was built as an elevated line because the ground in this area is right above the water table, and as a result the construction of a subway would have been prohibitively expensive. The first portion of the line between Utica Avenue and Junius Street opened on November 22, 1920, with shuttle trains operating over this route. The line opened one more stop farther to the east to Pennsylvania Avenue on December 24, 1920.

While work at this station and at Van Siclen Avenue was practically completed in 1921, they could not open yet because trains could not run to the terminal until track work, the signal tower, and the compressor room were in service. Work began on June 19, 1922, and shuttles started operating between Pennsylvania Avenue and New Lots Avenue on October 16, 1922. A two-car train operated single-track service on the northbound track. On October 31, 1924, through service to New Lots Avenue was begun.

As part of an 18-month capital budget that took effect on January 1, 1963, this station was reconstructed.

In 1968, as part of the proposed Program for Action, the IRT New Lots Line would have been extended southerly through the Livonia Yard to Flatlands Avenue to a modern terminal at Flatlands Avenue and Linwood Street, replacing the New Lots Avenue terminal. This line would have run at ground level and it would have provided better access to the then-growing community of Spring Creek. This extension would have been completed at the cost of $12 million.

In 2019, the MTA announced that this station would become ADA-accessible as part of the agency's 2020–2024 Capital Program. A request for proposals was put out on May 18, 2023 for the contract for a project bundle to make 13 stations accessible, including New Lots Avenue. The contract to add one elevator at the station was awarded in December 2023. To construct the elevator, this project would involve building a new station house by permanently pedestrianizing Livonia Avenue for a single block between Jerome and Warwick Streets.

== Station layout ==
This elevated station has two tracks and one island platform. The station has an active tower and crew quarters at platform level. The platform has a canopy for most of its length.

To the east of the station, the tracks curve into Livonia Yard. Northeast of the station, there is a never-used trackway structure which continues for about 75 feet (23 m). This extension was a provision for the line to continue east on New Lots Avenue.

=== Exits ===
The station's sole entrance/exit is two staircases to either western corner of Livonia Avenue and Ashford Street via an elevated, wooden mezzanine/station house under the far eastern end of the platform.

As part of the work to install ADA-accessible elevators at the station, a new entrance is expected to be built near the middle of the station, with one staircase and the elevator going down to the west side of Warwick Street at Livonia Avenue.
