= Harlem–148th Street station =

New York City Subway station in Manhattan

Harlem–148 Street
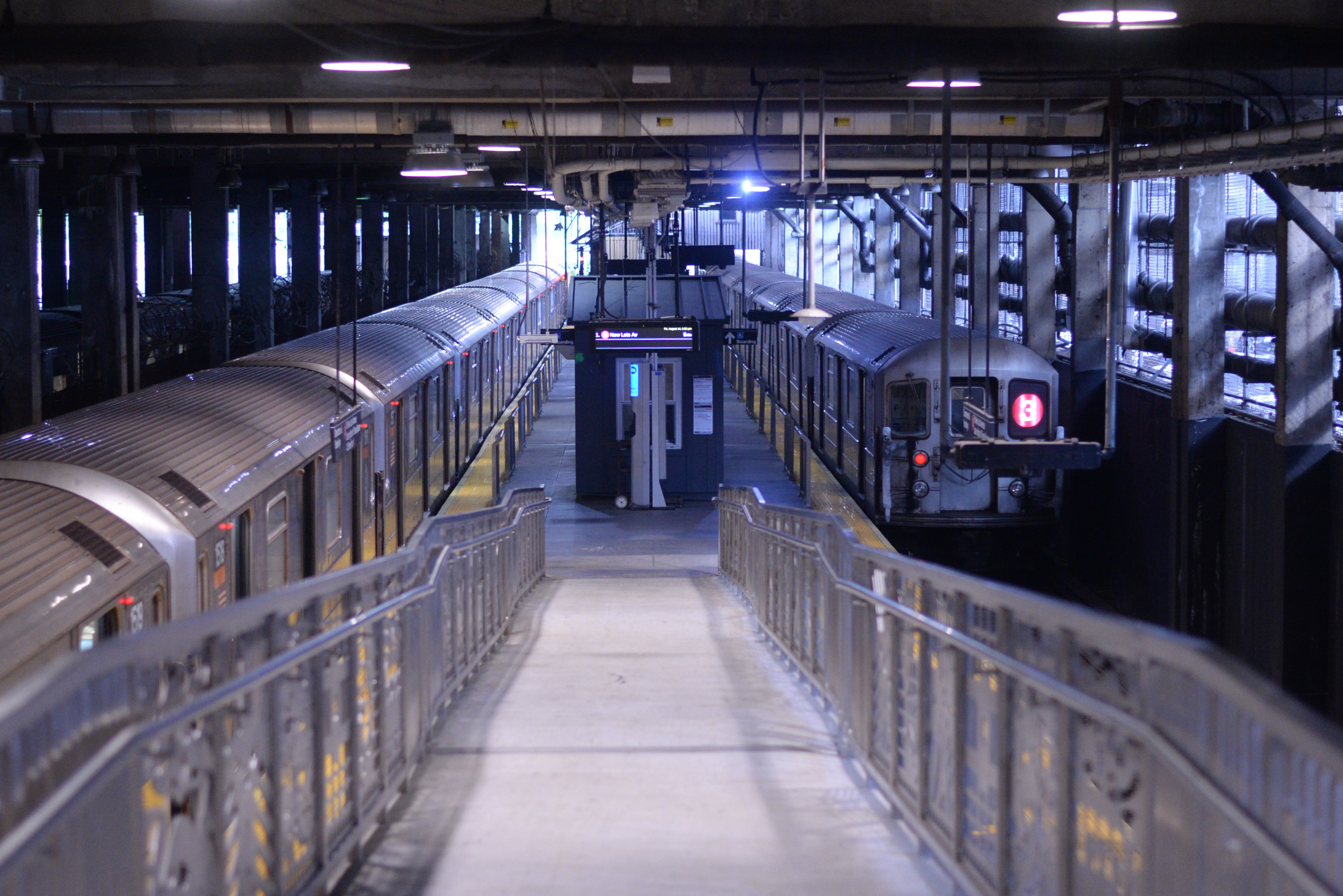
- A departing 3 train pulls away from the Harlem–148th St platform

Station statistics
- Address: West 149th Street & Adam Clayton Powell Jr. Boulevard; New York, New York
- Borough: Manhattan
- Locale: Harlem
- Coordinates: 40.824°N 73.937°W
- Division: A (IRT)
- Line: IRT Lenox Avenue Line
- Services: 3 (all times)
- Transit: NYCT Bus: M2
- Structure: Covered, At-grade
- Platforms: 1 island platform
- Tracks: 2

Other information
- Opened: May 13, 1968; 58 years ago
- Accessible: Yes
- Former/other names: 148th Street–Lenox Terminal

Traffic
- 2025: 665,995 ▲2.5%
- Rank: 360 out of 423
Services
Preceding station	New York City Subway	Following station
Terminus	3 (New York City Subway service)	145th Street toward New Lots Avenue
Location
Location within New York City Subway
Location within New York City
Location within New York
Track layout
Street map
Station service legend
Symbol	Description
Stops all times	Stops all times

The Harlem–148th Street station (also signed as 148th Street–Lenox Terminal station) is a New York City Subway station on the IRT Lenox Avenue Line in Harlem, Manhattan. It serves as the northern terminal station of the 3 train at all times as well as the Northern terminal of the IRT Lenox Avenue line. The entrance to the station is located at the intersection of 149th Street and Adam Clayton Powell Jr. Boulevard, which has historically been known as 7th Avenue. The station contains a pair of tracks and an island platform and is located at ground level (although at a lower elevation than the adjacent streets). A parking structure for the adjacent Frederick Douglass Academy is located above the station, forming a roof above the platform and tracks.

Although the Lenox Avenue Line was constructed in 1904, the Harlem–148th Street station was not part of the original line. The station was first proposed in 1940, and was opened in 1968 within the confines of the preexisting Lenox Yard. The station was intended to replace 145th Street, the next stop south, as the northern terminal of the Lenox Avenue Line. However, the 145th Street station remained open as a result of community opposition.

== History ==
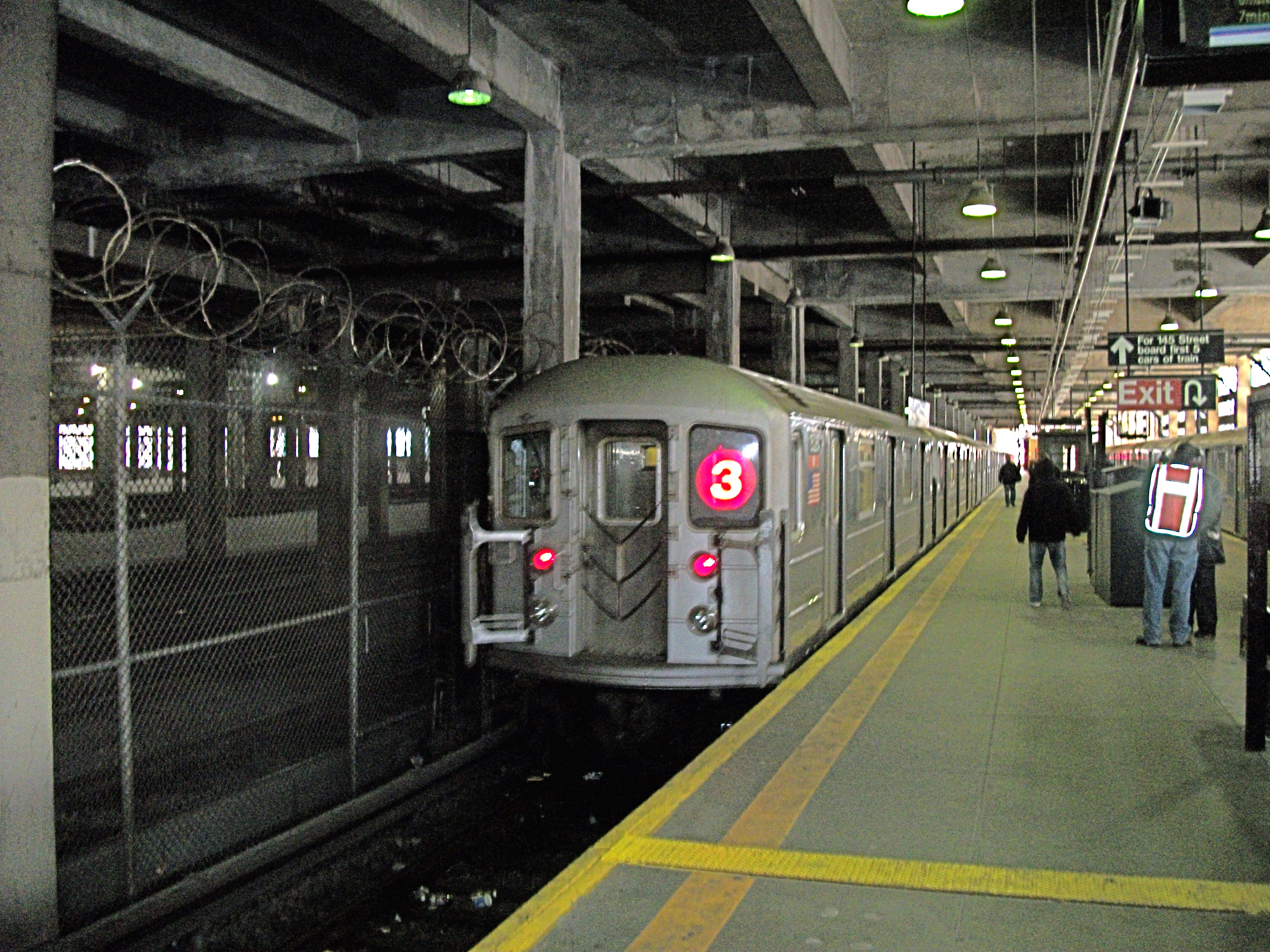
3 train leaving the station

=== Background ===
The station's location and tracks were originally part of the Lenox Avenue Yard opened in 1904, where 3 trains are currently stored. An extension of the Lenox Avenue line to 149th or 150th Street had been proposed since the Dual Contracts of the 1910s. In 1916, an extension to 149th Street was proposed as part of a connection between the Lenox Avenue Line and the IRT Jerome Avenue Line in the Bronx (served by the 4 train).

In 1940, the New York City Board of Transportation proposed extending the IRT Lenox Avenue Line to the Bronx along the northern portion of the IRT Ninth Avenue Line, in turn connecting to the Jerome Avenue Line at 167th Street. However, the tunnel from Sedgwick Avenue to Anderson–Jerome Avenues was built to elevated-railway standards, whose "open" third rails, which did not have any protective covers on top, were shorter than the subway's "covered" third rails. Another issue was that the Ninth Avenue Line could not carry subway cars, as it was only strong enough to carry the lighter wooden elevated cars. These incompatibilities prevented the connection from being built.

=== Opening ===
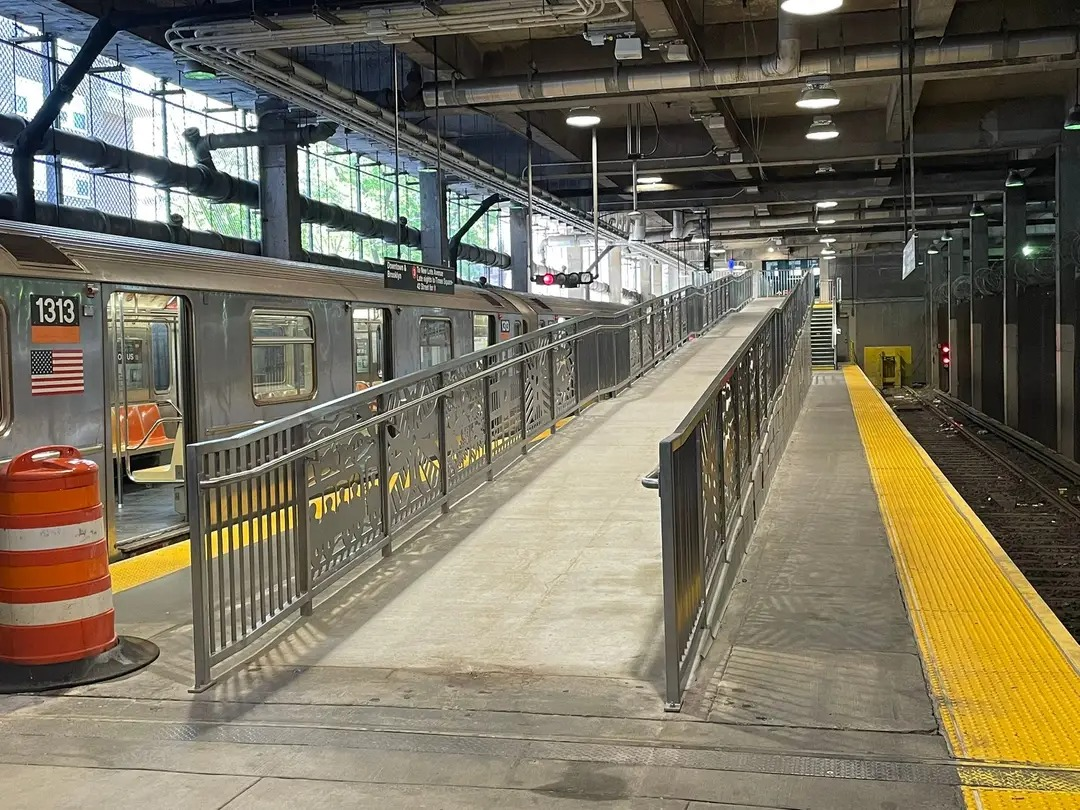
Wheelchair ramp from the station house, installed in 2026.

In 1957, a station at 150th Street within the Lenox Yard was proposed to better serve the local area (including the nearby Harlem River Houses). The station, and the Bronx extension, had been requested by local citizens since the 1940s due to unreliable bus and surface trolley service. The station was later moved to 149th Street due to Lenox Yard's downsizing in the 1960s, with the land sold to the developers that would build the Frederick Douglass Academy and the Esplanade Gardens apartment complex above the yard and station.

The new terminal, upon completion, was intended to replace the former terminal at 145th Street station due to the proximity of switches that prevented that station's lengthening to accommodate ten-car trains. However, plans to shut down 145th Street were cancelled due to protests from local residents. Trains began operating without passengers to the 148th Street station on May 5, 1968, and the station officially opened on May 13, 1968. The project was completed at a relatively low cost because the extension made use of two existing yard tracks. (Note: As a comparison, a one stop extension of the IND Sixth Avenue Line between 52nd and 58th Streets to a terminal at 57th Street, which was completed two months later, cost $13.2 million.) The station cost $1.29 million, track improvements cost $3.178 million, and signaling cost $3.553 million. The name of the station was originally planned to be 149th Street–Seventh Avenue station, but because of possible confusion with 149th Street–Grand Concourse, it was changed to 148th Street–Lenox Terminal.

=== Later changes ===
The station sign was reversed as Lenox Terminal–148th Street in the 1990s before reverting to its original name by 2003. From August 5, 1990, to September 4, 1994, and from September 10, 1995, to July 27, 2008, this station lacked full-time service, as 3 trains did not operate during late nights. Full-time service was restored on July 27, 2008.

In December 2019, the Metropolitan Transportation Authority (MTA) announced that this station would become ADA-accessible as part of the agency's 2020–2024 Capital Program. A request for proposals was put out on May 18, 2023 for the contract for a project bundle to make 13 stations accessible, including Harlem–148th Street. The contract to add one wheelchair ramp at the station was awarded in December 2023. The wheelchair ramp, which stretches from the mezzanine doorway around the staircase down to the platform, opened in May 2026, making the station fully accessible.

The MTA announced in April 2024 that it would make aesthetic improvements to the station during mid-2024 as part of its Re-New-Vation program.

== Station layout ==
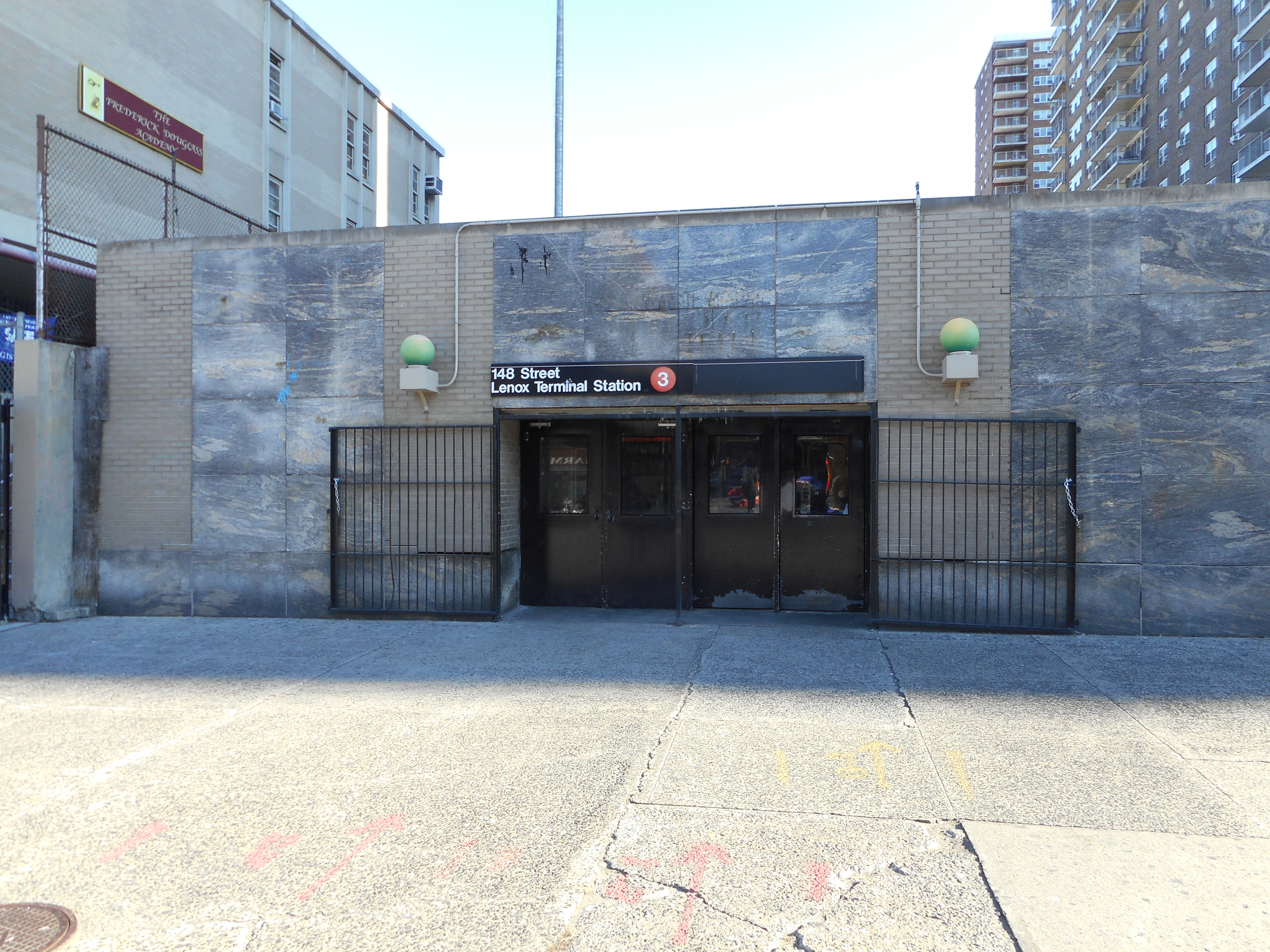
Entrance to Harlem–148th Street

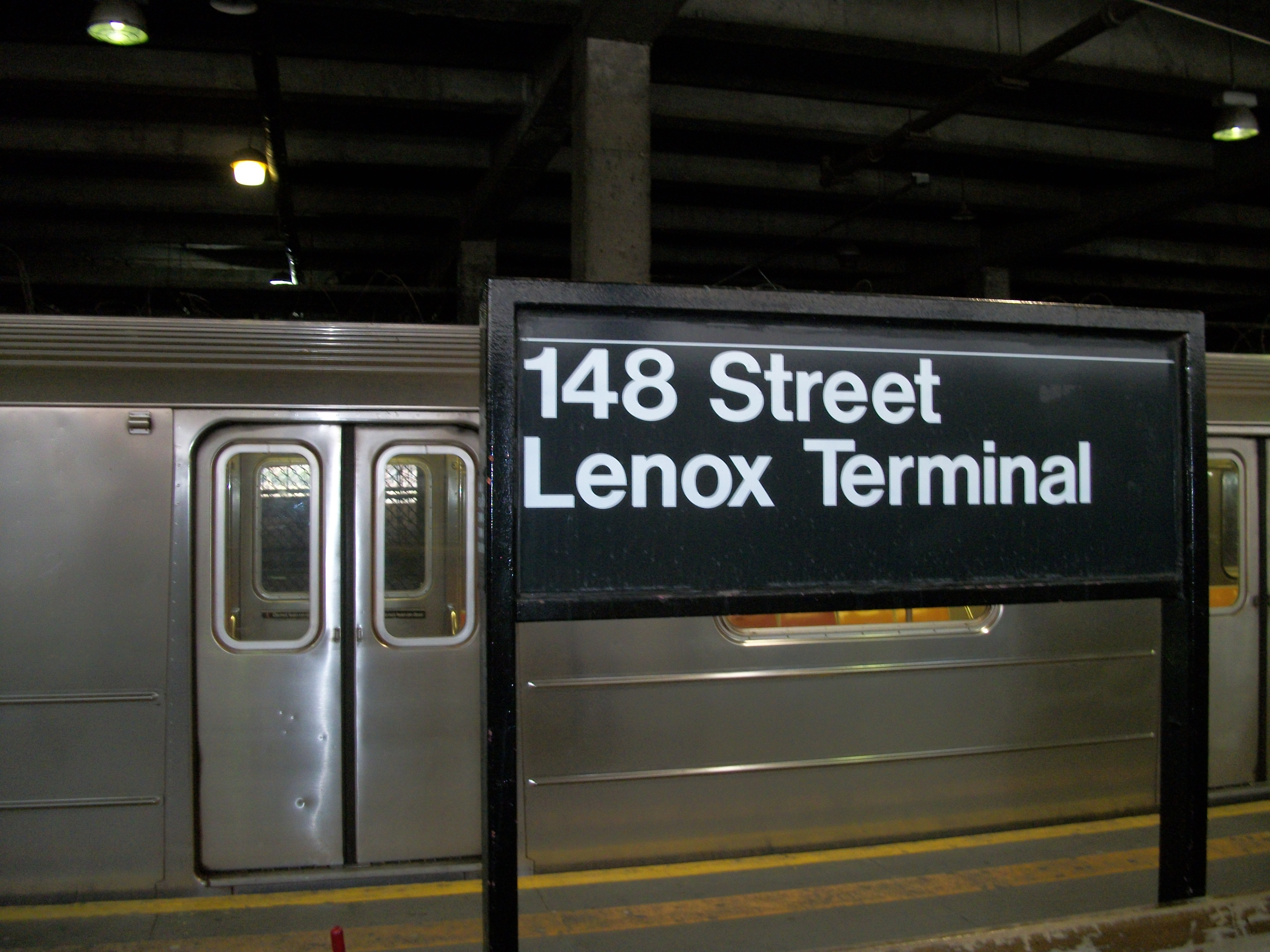
Station signage

The station is the northern terminus for the 3 train at all times; the next stop to the south is 145th Street. When this station opened, it supplanted 145th Street, the next stop south, as the northern terminal of the IRT Lenox Avenue Line. The station has two tracks and one island platform, and the tracks end at bumper blocks at the west end of the platform. The station is adjacent to Lenox Yard, which is used for train storage and has no maintenance facility. Due to the high ceiling, platform service information signs are hung from heavy cables.

While this station appears to be underground, it and the adjacent yard are actually at-grade. The Esplanade Gardens apartment complex is located between 147th and 149th streets while Frederick Douglass Academy High School sits between 149th and 150th Streets; both structures rest on pilotis above the station and yard.

=== Exit ===
The station's only mezzanine is at the west (railroad north) end of the station. From the single island platform, a wheelchair ramp and a double-wide stairway each lead up to a set of doors that separate the fare control to the street-level station-house at Adam Clayton Powell Jr. Boulevard and West 149th Street. There are three turnstiles and a token booth.
