= Nostrand Avenue station (IRT Eastern Parkway Line) =

New York City Subway station in Brooklyn

Nostrand Avenue
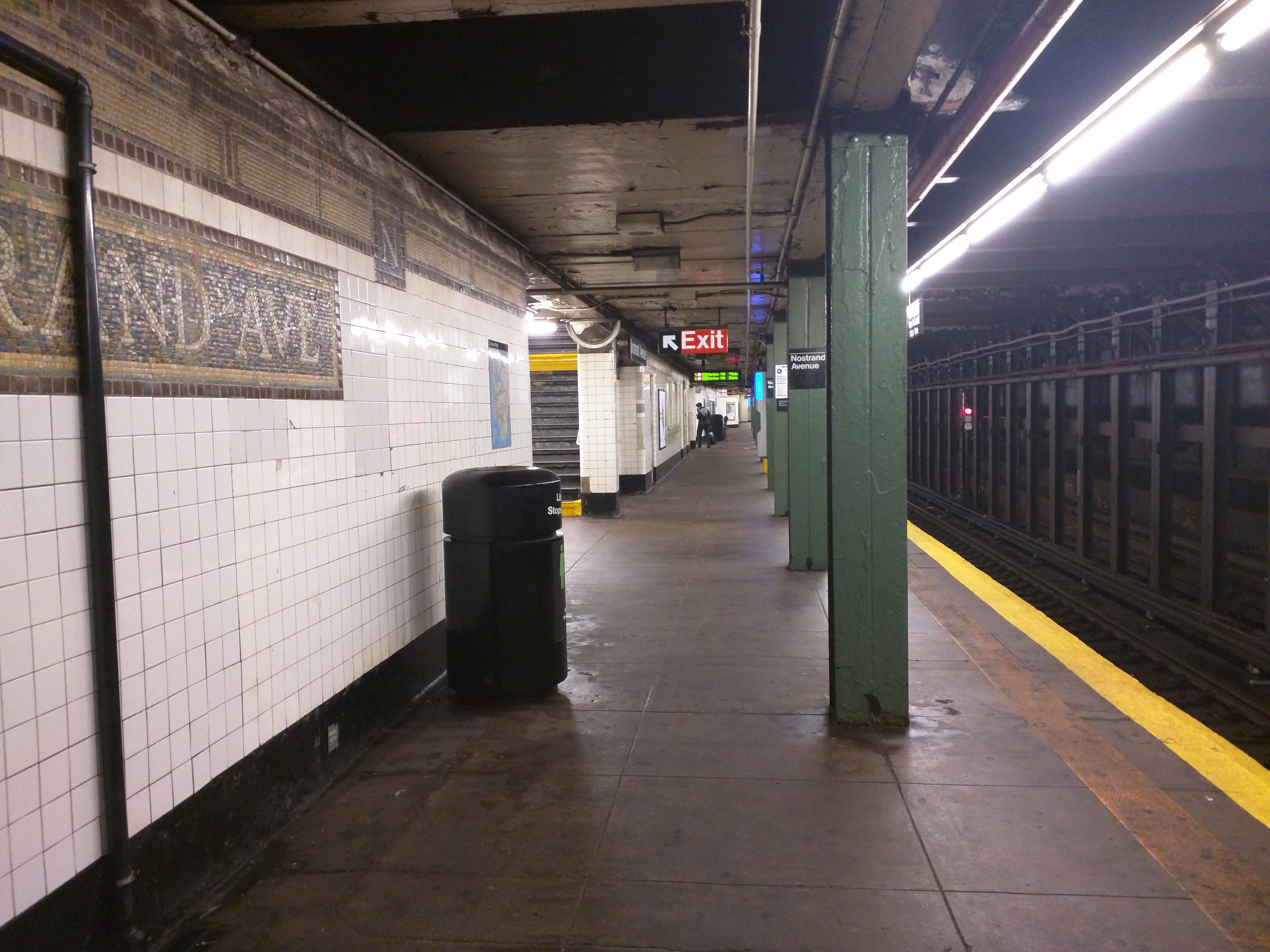
- Northbound platform

Station statistics
- Address: Nostrand Avenue & Eastern Parkway; Brooklyn, New York
- Borough: Brooklyn
- Locale: Crown Heights
- Coordinates: 40.6698°N 73.95052°W
- Division: A (IRT)
- Line: IRT Eastern Parkway Line
- Services: 2 (limited rush hour service in the reverse-peak direction); 3 (all except late nights); 4 (late nights, and limited rush hour service); 5 (one weekday a.m. rush hour trip in the northbound direction only)
- Transit: NYCT Bus: B44, B45
- Structure: Underground
- Levels: 2
- Platforms: 2 side platforms (1 on each level)
- Tracks: 4 (2 on each level)

Other information
- Opened: August 23, 1920; 106 years ago
- Accessible: No; planned

Traffic
- 2025: 811,771 ▼0.3%
- Rank: 339 out of 423
Services
Preceding station	New York City Subway	Following station
Franklin Avenue–Medgar Evers College 2 3 4 5 toward Harlem–148th Street	Local	Kingston Avenue 2 3 4 toward New Lots Avenue
Location
Location within New York City Subway
Location within New York City
Location within New York
Track layout
Street map
Station service legend
Symbol	Description
Stops all times except late nights	Stops all times except late nights
Stops late nights only	Stops late nights only
Stops rush hours only	Stops rush hours only
Stops weekdays during the day	Stops weekdays during the day

The Nostrand Avenue station is a local station on the IRT Eastern Parkway Line of the New York City Subway. Located at the intersection of Nostrand Avenue and Eastern Parkway in Crown Heights, Brooklyn, it is served by the 3 train at all times except late nights, when the 4 train takes over service. There is also limited rush hour 2 and 5 services here.

The station opened on August 23, 1920, as part of an extension of the IRT Eastern Parkway Line by the Interborough Rapid Transit Company. The station's platforms were extended in the 1964–1965 fiscal year so they could accommodate ten-car trains.

== History ==
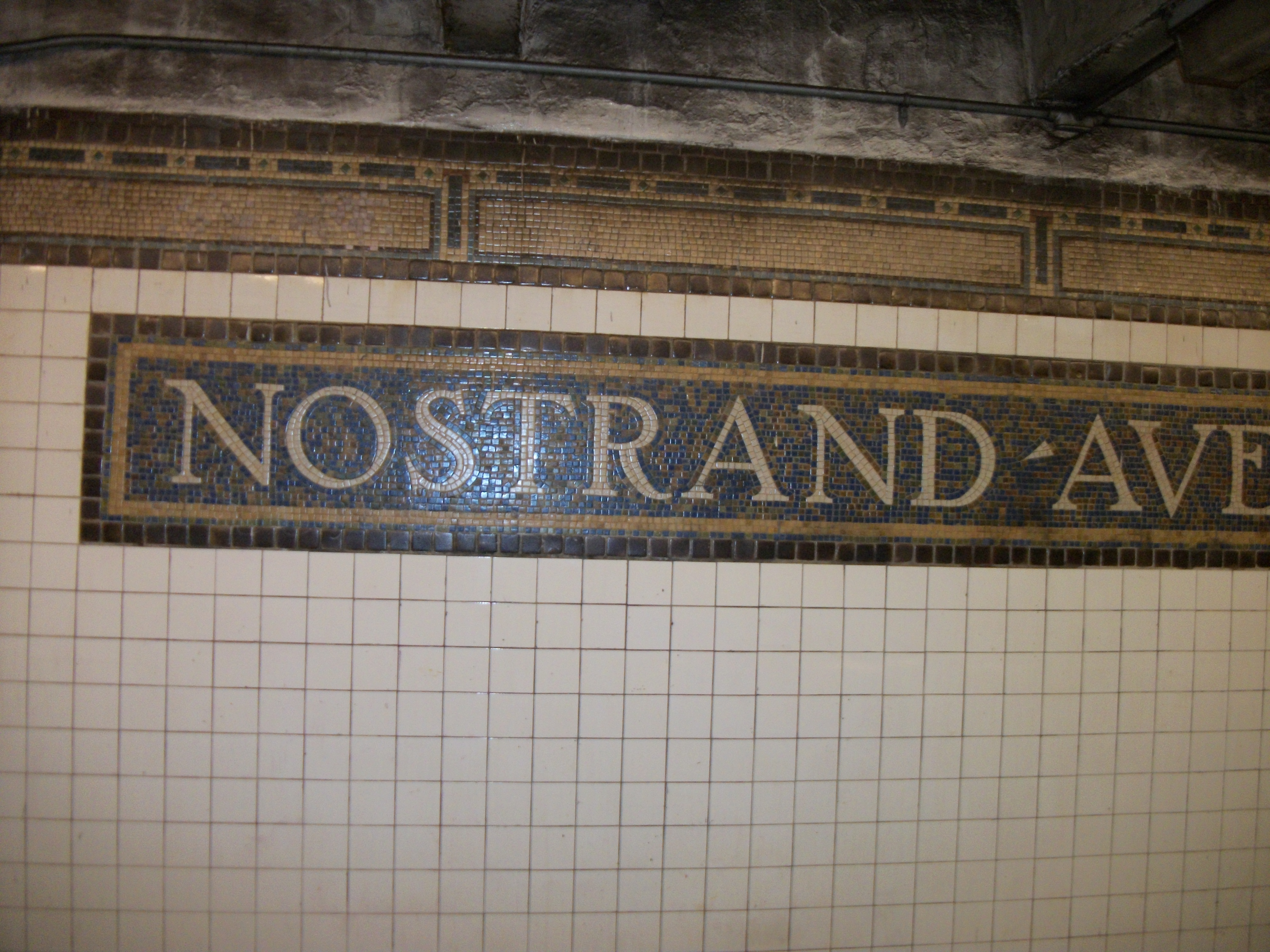
Mosaic name tablets

=== Background ===
Nostrand Avenue station was constructed as part of the Eastern Parkway Line. The line's section to Atlantic Avenue was part of Contract 2 of the Interborough Rapid Transit Company (IRT)'s plan to construct an extension of the original subway, Contract 1. Contract 2 extended the original line from City Hall in Manhattan to Atlantic Avenue in Brooklyn. The Board of Rapid Transit Commissioners approved the route on September 27, 1900, and the contract was signed on September 11, 1902. Construction commenced on Contract 2 on March 4, 1903. The first section opened on January 9, 1908, extending the subway from Bowling Green to Borough Hall. On April 28, 1908, the IRT formally applied with the New York Public Service Commission for permission to open the final section of the Contract 2 line from Borough Hall to Atlantic Avenue near the Flatbush Avenue LIRR station. The application was approved, and the IRT extension opened on May 1, 1908.

On March 19, 1913, New York City, the Brooklyn Rapid Transit Company, and the IRT reached an agreement, known as the Dual Contracts, to drastically expand subway service across New York City. As part of Contract 3 of the agreement, between New York City and the IRT, the original subway opened by the IRT in 1904 to City Hall, and extended to Atlantic Avenue in 1908, was to be extended eastward into Brooklyn. The line was to be extended along Flatbush Avenue and Eastern Parkway to Buffalo Street as a four-track subway line, and then along East 98th Street and Livonia Avenue to New Lots Avenue as an elevated two-track line, with provisions for the addition of a third track. In addition, a two-track branch line along Nostrand Avenue branching off east of the Franklin Avenue station was to be constructed. The underground portion of the line became known as the Eastern Parkway Line, or Route 12, while the elevated portion became known as the New Lots Line.

=== Construction and opening ===
The IRT Eastern Parkway Line was built as part of Route 12 from 1915 to 1918. On August 23, 1920, the Eastern Parkway Line was extended from Atlantic Avenue to Crown Heights–Utica Avenue, with the Nostrand Avenue station opening at this time. The new trains would be served by trains from Seventh Avenue.

=== Later years ===
During the 1964–1965 fiscal year, the platforms at Kingston Avenue, along with those at four other stations on the Eastern Parkway Line, were lengthened to 525 feet (160 m) to accommodate a ten-car train of 51-foot (16 m) IRT cars. The work was performed by the Arthur A. Johnson Corporation.

As part of its 2025–2029 Capital Program, the MTA has proposed making the station wheelchair-accessible in compliance with the Americans with Disabilities Act of 1990.

== Station layout ==
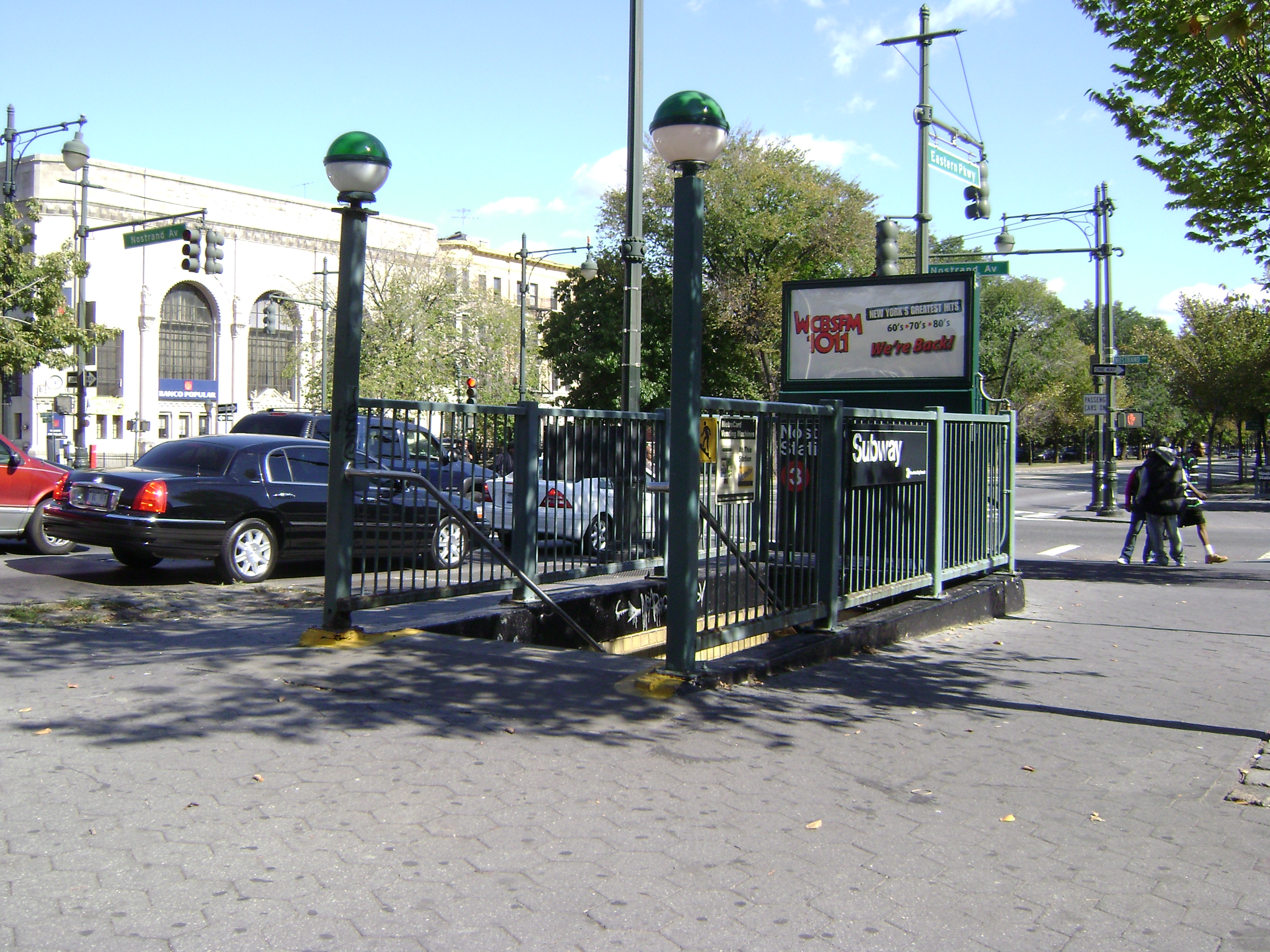
Street stair

This underground local station has two levels. The upper level serves New Lots Avenue-bound trains while the lower level serves Manhattan-bound trains. From north to south, each level has an express track, a local track, and one side platform. 3 trains stop here at all times except late nights and 4 trains stop here during late nights. Other times, 4 trains as well as limited rush hour 5 trains run on the express track to the north of the local track on each level to bypass the station. Limited rush hour 2 trains in the reverse-peak direction and one weekday morning northbound 5 train also serve this station. The station is between Franklin Avenue–Medgar Evers College to the west (railroad north) and Kingston Avenue to the east (railroad south).

Both platforms have their original Dual Contracts-era IRT trim line and name tablets. The trim line has a tan-yellow center, brown border, and a spec of blue in-between. "N" tablets on a blue background and brown border run along the trim line at regular intervals. The name tablets read "NOSTRAND AVE." in serif font in gold lettering on a blue and brown background, a gold center, and brown border.

The platform extensions at either end have signs reading "NOSTRAND AVE" in white sans serif lettering on a brown border. The center of the platforms has green I-beam columns at regular intervals with alternating ones having the standard black station name plate in white lettering.

West of this station (railroad north), the perpendicular IRT Nostrand Avenue Line merges with the IRT Eastern Parkway Line at the Rogers Avenue Junction. President Street–Medgar Evers College on that line is two blocks to the south.

=== Exits ===
The upper level has one fare control at the center with two staircases going down to the lower level. It has a turnstile bank, token booth, and two staircases going up to the south side mall of Eastern Parkway (between the main and service roads) and Nostrand Avenue. One staircase goes to the southeast corner while the other goes to the southwest corner.
