= Kingston Avenue =

Kingston Avenues may refer to the following stations of the New York City Subway in Brooklyn:

- Kingston–Throop Avenues (IND Fulton Street Line), serving the A and C trains
- Kingston Avenue (IRT Eastern Parkway Line), serving the 2, 3, 4, and 5 trains
