= Seventh Avenue Express =

Seventh Avenue Express is the name of the following subway services in New York City:

- Seventh Avenue Express-Lenox (3)
- Seventh Avenue Express-White Plains Road (2)
- Broadway-Seventh Avenue Express, former service between Van Cortlandt Park and Brooklyn
