= Crown Heights–Utica Avenue station =

New York City Subway station in Brooklyn

Crown Heights–Utica Avenue
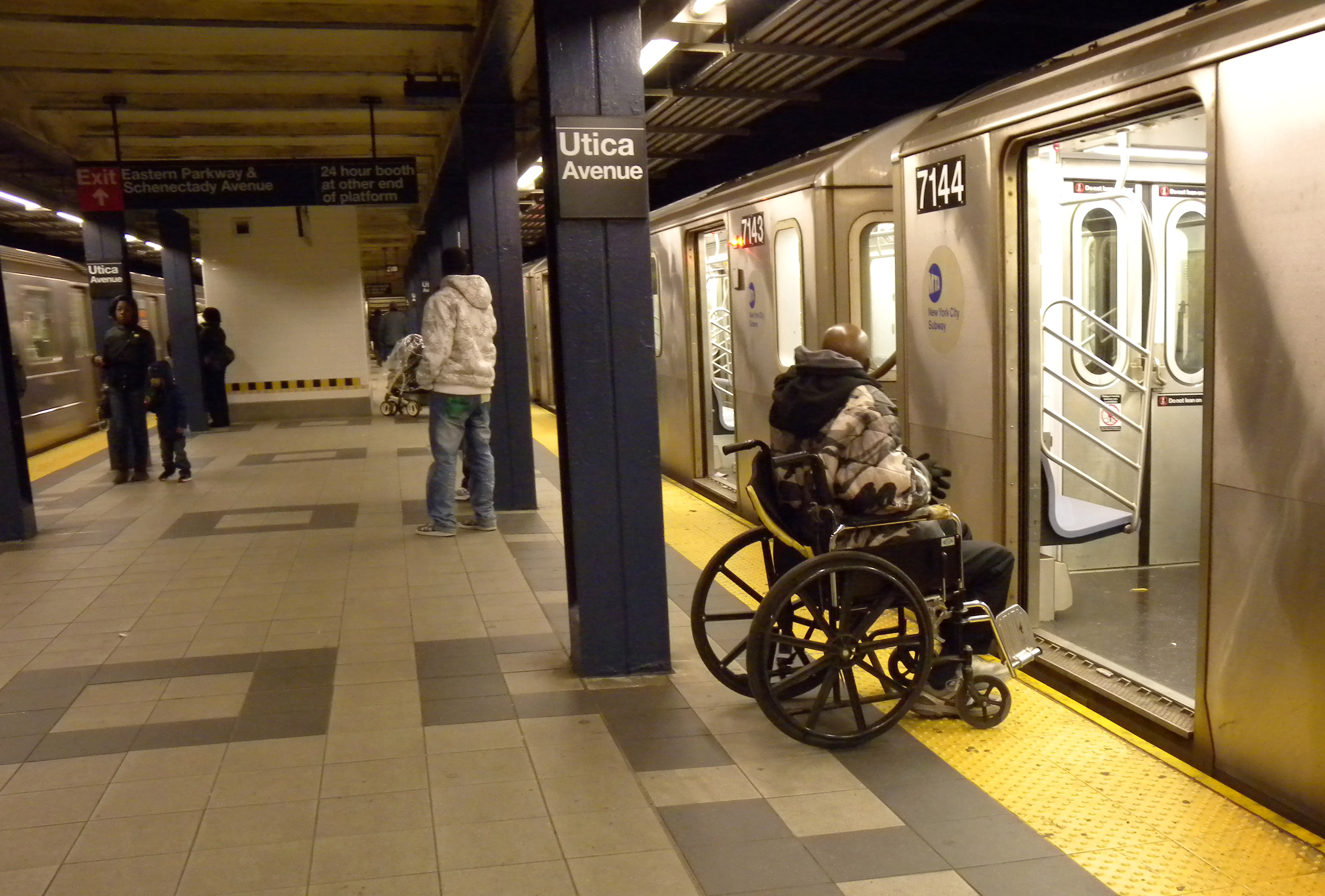
- A southbound express R142 4 train on the upper level

Station statistics
- Address: Utica Avenue & Eastern Parkway; Brooklyn, New York
- Borough: Brooklyn
- Locale: Crown Heights
- Coordinates: 40.668758°N 73.931208°W
- Division: A (IRT)
- Line: IRT Eastern Parkway Line
- Services: 2 (limited rush hour service in the reverse-peak direction); 3 (all except late nights); 4 (all times); 5 (limited rush hour service only)
- Transit: NYCT Bus: B14, B17, B45, B46, B46 SBS
- Structure: Underground
- Levels: 2
- Platforms: 2 island platforms (1 on each level) cross-platform interchange
- Tracks: 4 (2 on each level)

Other information
- Opened: August 23, 1920; 106 years ago
- Accessible: Yes

Traffic
- 2025: 5,223,543 ▲1.6%
- Rank: 56 out of 423
Services
| Preceding station | New York City Subway | Following station |
|---|---|---|
| Franklin Avenue–Medgar Evers College 4 5 toward Woodlawn | Express | Terminus |
| Kingston Avenue 2 3 4 5 toward Harlem–148th Street | Local | Sutter Avenue–Rutland Road 2 3 4 toward New Lots Avenue |
Location
Location within New York City Subway
Location within New York City
Location within New York
Track layout
Upper level
Lower level
Street map
Station service legend
| Symbol | Description |
| Stops all times except late nights | Stops all times except late nights |
| Stops all times | Stops all times |
| Stops late nights only | Stops late nights only |
| Stops rush hours only | Stops rush hours only |
| Stops rush hours in the peak direction only | Stops rush hours in the peak direction only |

The Crown Heights–Utica Avenue station (signed as Utica Avenue) is an express station on the IRT Eastern Parkway Line of the New York City Subway. Located under Eastern Parkway near Utica Avenue in Crown Heights, Brooklyn, it is served by the 4 train at all times and the 3 train at all times except late nights. It is the southern terminus for daytime 4 trains. There is also limited rush hour 2 and 5 services here.

Despite its name, this station has no exit to the corner of Utica Avenue and Eastern Parkway. It is actually located between Schenectady and Utica Avenues and the two exits lead to the middle of the block, several feet from the actual cross street.

The station opened on August 23, 1920, as part of an extension of the IRT Eastern Parkway Line by the Interborough Rapid Transit Company.

== History ==
=== Background ===
Crown Heights—Utica Avenue station was constructed as part of the Eastern Parkway Line. The line's section to Atlantic Avenue was part of Contract 2 of the Interborough Rapid Transit Company (IRT)'s plan to construct an extension of the original subway, Contract 1. Contract 2 extended the original line from City Hall in Manhattan to Atlantic Avenue in Brooklyn. The Board of Rapid Transit Commissioners approved the route on September 27, 1900, and the contract was signed on September 11, 1902. Construction commenced on Contract 2 on March 4, 1903. The first section opened on January 9, 1908, extending the subway from Bowling Green to Borough Hall. On April 28, 1908, the IRT formally applied with the New York Public Service Commission for permission to open the final section of the Contract 2 line from Borough Hall to Atlantic Avenue near the Flatbush Avenue LIRR station. The application was approved, and the IRT extension opened on May 1, 1908.

On March 19, 1913, New York City, the Brooklyn Rapid Transit Company, and the IRT reached an agreement, known as the Dual Contracts, to drastically expand subway service across New York City. As part of Contract 3 of the agreement, between New York City and the IRT, the original subway opened by the IRT in 1904 to City Hall, and extended to Atlantic Avenue in 1908, was to be extended eastward into Brooklyn. The line was to be extended along Flatbush Avenue and Eastern Parkway to Buffalo Street as a four-track subway line, and then along East 98th Street and Livonia Avenue to New Lots Avenue as an elevated two-track line, with provisions for the addition of a third track. In addition, a two-track branch line along Nostrand Avenue branching off east of the Franklin Avenue station was to be constructed. The underground portion of the line became known as the Eastern Parkway Line, or Route 12, while the elevated portion became known as the New Lots Line.

=== Construction and opening ===
The IRT Eastern Parkway Line was built as part of Route 12 from 1915 to 1918. On August 23, 1920, the Eastern Parkway Line was extended from Atlantic Avenue to Crown Heights–Utica Avenue, with the Utica Avenue station opening at this time. The new trains would be served by trains from Seventh Avenue.

On November 22, 1920, the first portion of the IRT New Lots Line opened between Utica Avenue and Junius Street opened on November 22, 1920, with shuttle trains operating over this route.

=== Later years ===
The New York City Board of Transportation announced plans in November 1949 to extend platforms at several IRT stations, including Utica Avenue, to accommodate all doors on ten-car trains. Although ten-car trains already operated on the line, the rear car could not open its doors at the station because the platforms were so short. Funding for the platform extensions was included in the city's 1950 capital budget.

In 1981, the Metropolitan Transportation Authority listed the station among the 69 most deteriorated stations in the subway system. A renovation of the Utica Avenue station was funded as part of the MTA's 1980–1984 capital plan. The MTA received a $106 million grant from the Urban Mass Transit Administration in October 1983; most of the grant would fund the renovation of eleven stations, including Utica Avenue.

In April 1993, the New York State Legislature agreed to give the MTA $9.6 billion for capital improvements. Some of the funds would be used to renovate nearly one hundred New York City Subway stations, including Utica Avenue. The MTA announced in 2024 that it would replace the station's existing waist-high turnstiles with taller, wide-aisle turnstiles. In April 2025, the MTA announced plans to install taller fare gates with glass panels at 20 stations, including the Crown Heights–Utica Avenue station. The fare gates would be manufactured by Cubic Transportation Systems, Conduent, Scheidt & Bachmann, and STraffic as part of a pilot program to reduce fare evasion.

== Station layout ==
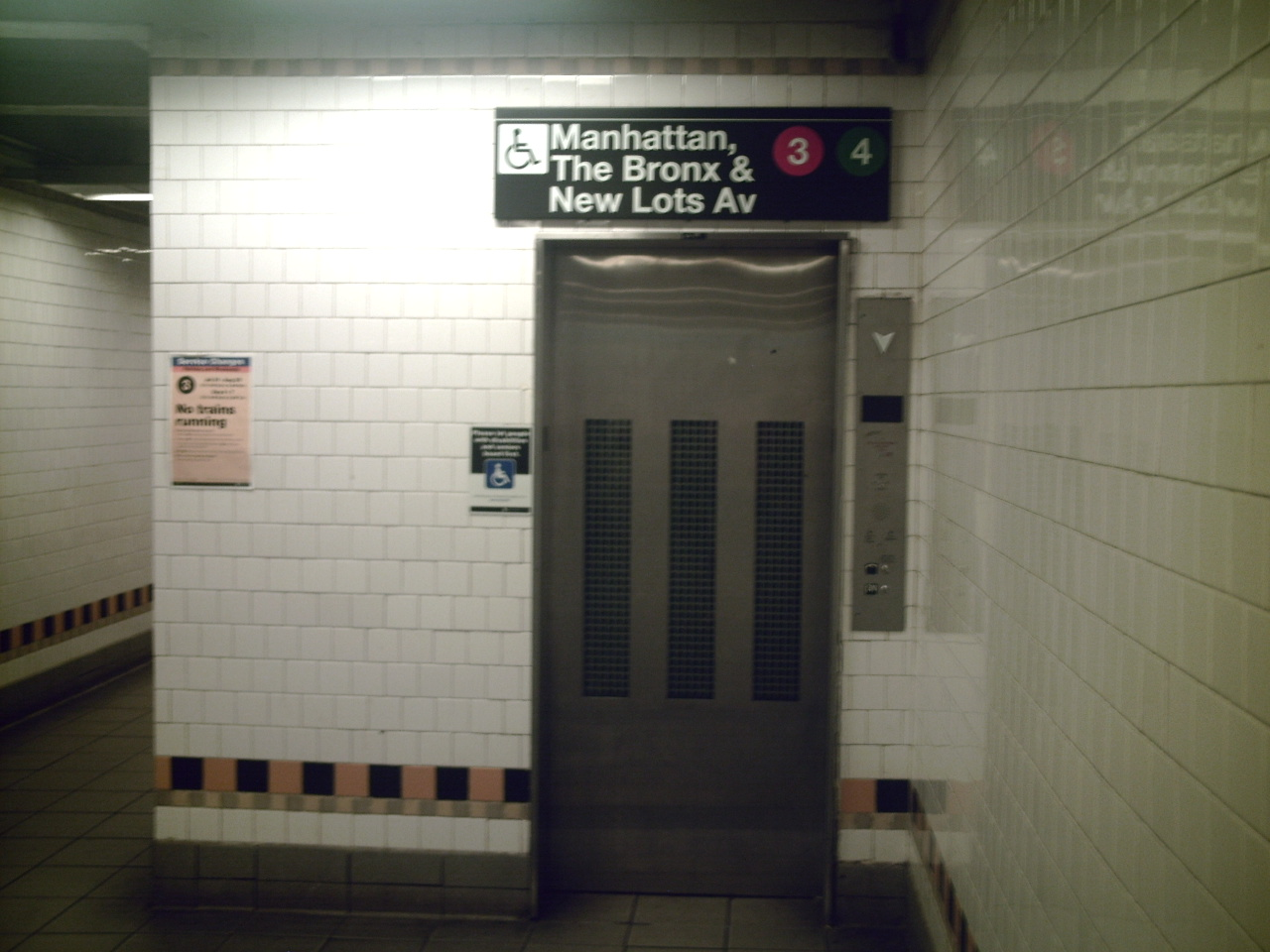
Elevator to platforms

The Crown Heights–Utica Avenue station, signed as Utica Avenue station, is an express station configured in a two level layout, with southbound trains on the upper level and northbound trains on the lower one, each consisting of an island platform with the local tracks to the west and the express tracks to the east. The station is served by the 4 train at all times and by the 3 train at all times except late nights. During rush hours, limited 2 and 5 trains also serve the station. 2, 3 and nighttime 4 trains run on the local tracks along with two weekday a.m. northbound 5 trains, while most daytime 4 and limited rush hour 5 trains run on the express tracks. Southbound 4 and 5 express trains both discharge all passengers on the upper level before reversing direction and returning northbound on the lower level to recruit passengers.

The next stop to the west (railroad north) is Kingston Avenue for local trains and Franklin Avenue–Medgar Evers College for express trains. The next stop for all service to the east (railroad south), with the exception of the aforementioned most daytime 4 and limited rush hour 5 trains that originate and terminate here, is Sutter Avenue–Rutland Road.

This is the easternmost underground and four-track subway station on the Eastern Parkway Line; to the east (railroad south) of here, the local tracks rises to an elevated structure and become the IRT New Lots Line, while the express tracks end at bumper blocks just under Ralph Avenue. Diamond crossover tracks exist west (railroad north) of the station for northbound trains and east for southbound trains. Another diamond crossover, east of here, connects the southbound express track to a ramp down to the lower level. Trains descending the ramp can access either the local or express track.

There is an active tower at the south end of the platform while a closed one exists on the east of the lower level.

=== Exits ===
The station's two exits are located at either end. The one on the west (railroad north) is staffed weekdays only and accessed via a wide staircase in place of the end wall of the New Lots Avenue-bound platform. This staircase leads up to a small mezzanine where there is a token booth and turnstiles. When the booth and turnstile bank are closed, three HEET turnstiles and one exit-only turnstile provide access to/from the entrance. The two street staircases lead out to the two malls on either side of the main road of Eastern Parkway on the west side of Schenectady Avenue.

The station's full-time exit is at the east end (railroad south) of the platforms. Two narrow staircases and one elevator connect both platforms to a small upper level mezzanine that has two public restrooms (one for men and the other for women) and leads to a bank of turnstiles. The four street stairs here lead to either mall of Eastern Parkway west of Utica Avenue, two on the north mall and two on the south mall. Another elevator from the north mall leads to fare control.

=== Design ===
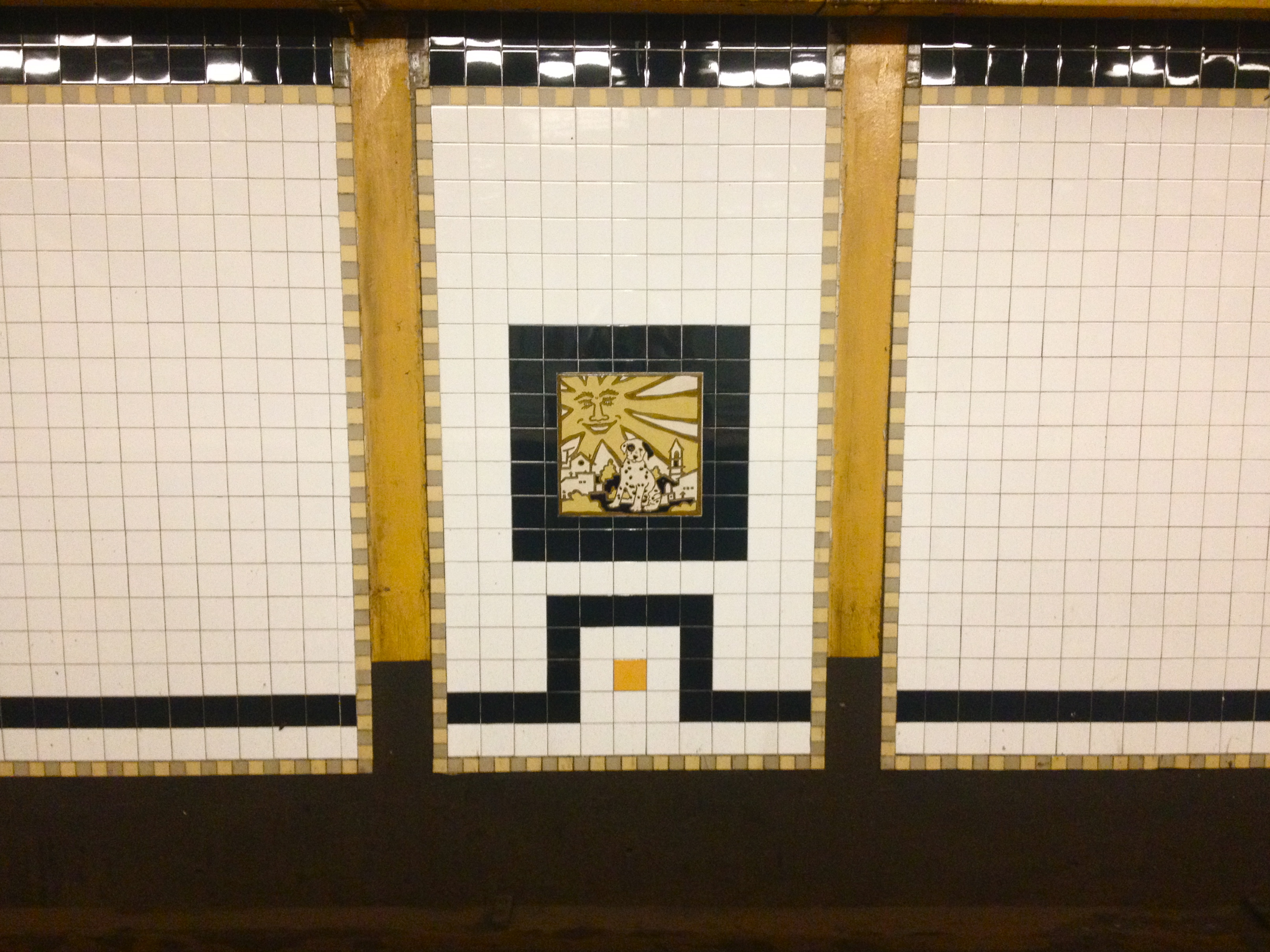
Detail of Good Morning and Good Night by Hugo Consuegra

On the New Lots Avenue-bound platform, the track walls have a section of yellow-orange tiles beneath the trim-line and another line of yellow tiles on the bottom of the tiled portions. The I-beams and other steel work along the track walls are painted in dark blue. The Manhattan-bound platform has its metalwork painted in golden yellow and the tiles beneath the trim line in dark blue. In the station, there are ornate doors in the tile walls which serve as vent chambers.

The 2004 artwork here is part of a series called Good Morning and Good Night. It consists of ceramic tiles of the sun and moon on the platform walls.

== Provisions for expansion ==
Extensions of the IRT subway east or south of the station have been proposed since the line's planning in the 1910s, which included terminating the line at Buffalo Avenue just east of the station, or extending the line down Utica Avenue towards Flatbush Avenue and Avenue U near Kings Plaza. The Utica Avenue extension in particular has been proposed several times as part of the New York City Transit Authority's 1968 expansion proposals, in older pre-unification plans, and in the competing pre-unification expansion plans of the Independent Subway System (IND). Just east of this station, a bellmouth splits away from the local track on both levels, and curves south. This was built into the station as a provision for the proposed Utica Avenue Line, which is why the station itself has no exits to Utica Avenue. In 2015, New York City Mayor Bill de Blasio announced his proposal for an extension of the 3 and 4 trains down Utica Avenue.
