= 3 (New York City Subway service) =

Rapid transit service

- Seventh Avenue Express

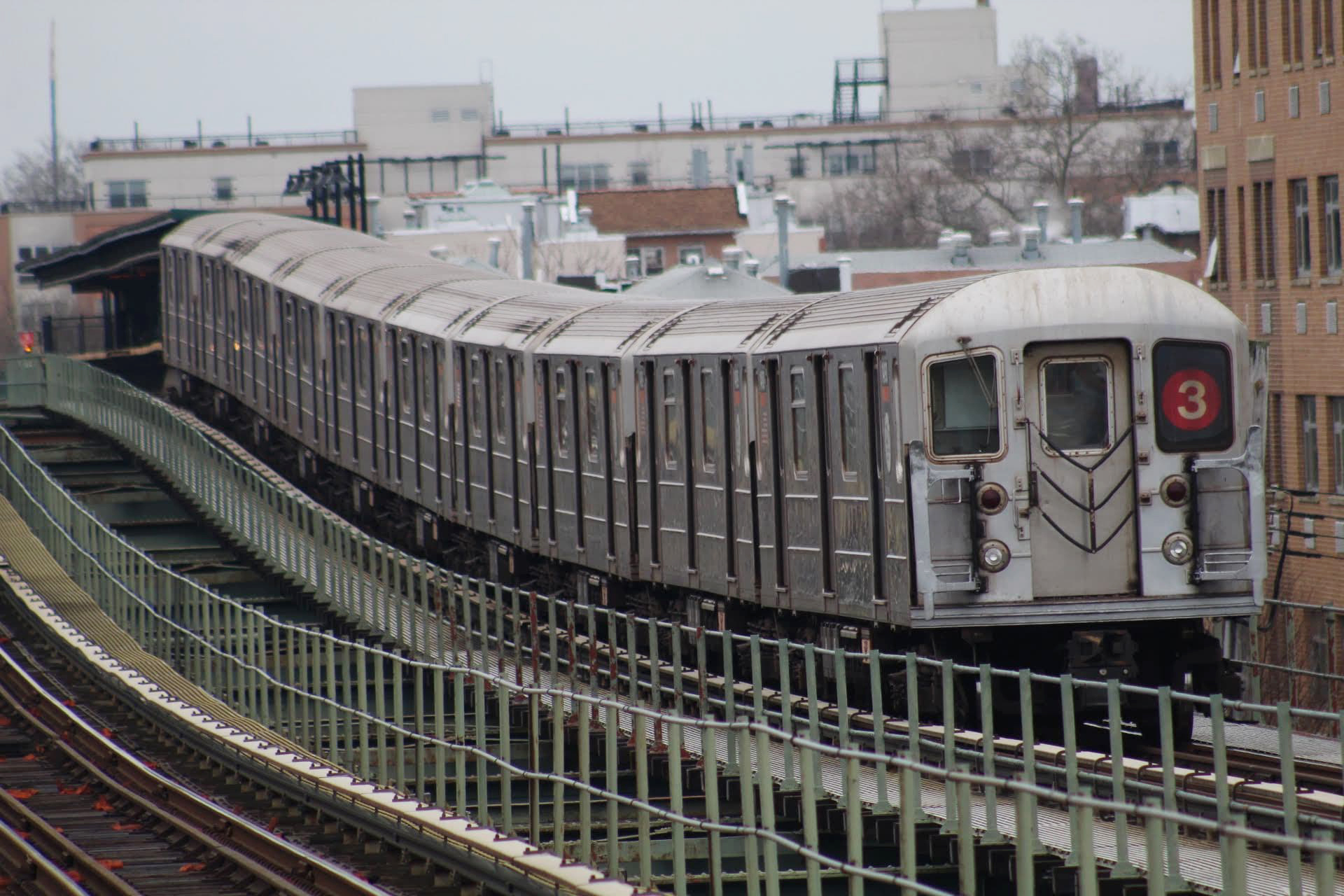
- A New Lots Avenue-bound 3 train of R62s approaching Van Siclen Avenue

- Northern end: Harlem–148th Street
- Southern end: 34th Street–Penn Station (late nights); New Lots Avenue (all times except late nights)
- Stations: 34; 10 (overnight service)
- Rolling stock: R62 (Rolling stock assignments subject to change)
- Depot: Livonia Yard
- Started service: November 23, 1904; 121 years ago

The 3 Seventh Avenue Express is a rapid transit service in the A Division of the New York City Subway. Its route emblem, or "bullet", is colored red since it uses the IRT Broadway–Seventh Avenue Line through most of Manhattan.

The 3 operates 24 hours daily, although service patterns vary based on the time of day. Daytime service operates between 148th Street in Harlem, Manhattan and New Lots Avenue in East New York, Brooklyn, making express stops in Manhattan (between 96th and Chambers Streets) and all stops in Brooklyn. Overnight service short turns at 34th Street–Penn Station in Midtown Manhattan and does not operate to or from New Lots Avenue.

The 3 train formerly ran to City Hall or South Ferry in Manhattan, and was later rerouted to Flatbush Avenue–Brooklyn College in Brooklyn. In 1983, it was rerouted to New Lots Avenue.

== Service history ==
=== Early history ===
On November 23, 1904, the IRT Lenox Avenue Line opened between 96th Street and 145th Street. Service ran between 145th Street and City Hall, making all stops.

On July 1, 1918, the entire IRT Broadway–Seventh Avenue Line was completed. Lenox Avenue service from 145th Street was rerouted south of 42nd Street from the IRT Lexington Avenue Line to this new line, making all stops to South Ferry.

As of 1934, service operated between 145th Street and South Ferry except late nights, when service operated between 145th Street and 96th Street, making local stops.

The IRT routes were given numbered designations with the introduction of "R-type" rolling stock, which contained rollsign curtains with numbered designations for each service. The first such fleet, the R12, was put into service in 1948. The Seventh Avenue–Lenox route became known as the 3.

=== Under the New York City Transit Authority ===
On January 3, 1955, late night two-car shuttle service between 145th Street and 96th Street, between 12:12 and 6:57 a.m. was discontinued due to low ridership. As a result, 145th Street was closed overnight. In addition, some 3 trains started running express in Manhattan during rush hours. These trains were extended to Flatbush Avenue; a few layups and put-ins ran to New Lots Avenue. However, from December 20, 1957, 3 trains were rerouted to New Lots Avenue during rush hours. On February 6, 1959, all trains except late nights made express stops in Manhattan as part of the "West Side Improvement" and ran to Flatbush Avenue.

Starting April 8, 1960, 3 trains were rerouted from Flatbush Avenue to New Lots Avenue, and weekday evening service between 9 p.m. and 1 a.m. was cut to a shuttle between 145th Street and 135th Street. Before the change, 3 trains had run between 145th Street and Flatbush Avenue between about 5:30 a.m. and 12:45 a.m. on weekdays and Saturdays and from about 7:15 a.m. to 12:45 a.m. on Sundays. This service had been supplemented by additional service to and from New Lots Avenue.

However, on April 18, 1965, 3 service started to run to Flatbush Avenue again. On October 17, 1965, weekend evening service was also cut to a shuttle between 145th Street and 135th Street.

On May 13, 1968, trains were extended to the newly completed 148th Street–Lenox Terminal. Later that year, on November 12, late night shuttle service was implemented between 148th Street and 135th Street. On May 23, 1976, the current practice of starting Sunday service late (9 or 10 a.m.) began.

On July 10, 1983, the 2 and 3 trains swapped terminals in Brooklyn, with 2 trains terminating at Flatbush Avenue and 3 trains terminating at New Lots Avenue. These changes were made to reduce non-revenue subway car mileage, to provide a dedicated fleet for each service, and to provide an easily accessible inspection yard for each service. The change allowed the 2 to be dedicated to 239th Street Yard and allowed the 3 to be assigned to Livonia Yard. With the rerouting of 3 trains, train lengths along the New Lots Line were reduced from 10 cars to 9 cars, within acceptable crowding levels, and train lengths along the Nostrand Avenue Line were increased from 9 to 10 cars, reducing crowding.

Beginning on August 5, 1990, late-night shuttles between 148th Street and 135th Street were discontinued and replaced by shuttle buses. On September 4, 1994, late-night shuttles between 148th Street and 135th Street were resumed, but were discontinued again on September 10, 1995. This was a cost-saving measure due to low ridership.

In January 1991, a reduction of service along the Eastern Parkway corridor to remove excess capacity was proposed. Weekend daytime 3 service would be rerouted to originate and terminate at South Ferry in Manhattan instead of New Lots Avenue in Brooklyn. Service between Chambers Street and Franklin Avenue would be provided by 2 trains; service between Franklin Avenue and New Lots Avenue would be provided by extended 4 trains. This service change would have been implemented in July 1991, pending approval from the MTA board.

From March 2 to October 12, 1998, the IRT Lenox Avenue Line was rehabilitated. Most 3 service was rerouted to 137th Street–City College. From October 4, 1999, to August 3, 2001, Limited AM rush hour 3 trains originated at 137th Street – City College instead of 148th Street; these trains ran local to 96th Street before switching to the express track. From August 6, 2001, to April 25, 2003, limited AM rush hour 3 trains originated at East 180th Street in the Bronx instead of 148th Street.

=== 2001–present ===
After the September 11, 2001 attacks, 3 service was initially split in two sections, with the northern section operating between 148th and 135th Streets and the southern section operating between Utica Avenue and New Lots Avenue, but service in Brooklyn was replaced by 4 trains on the evening of September 12, leaving the 3 to operate only as a shuttle between 148th and 135th Streets. On September 17, service was restored along the full route and made all stops in Manhattan, with trains skipping Franklin Street, Chambers Street and Park Place; Franklin Street reopened on September 18. On September 19, service was cut back from New Lots Avenue to 14th Street in Manhattan; 3 trains made express stops between 96th and 14th Streets, while the 1 replaced the 3 in Brooklyn. Also on this date, 3 trains began to permanently use consists of 10-car trains as a result of equipment sharing between Livonia Yard (the maintenance facility in Brooklyn where subway cars assigned to the 3 are based from) and 240th Street Yard (the maintenance facility in the Bronx where subway cars assigned to the 1 are based from). Normal 3 service was restored on September 15, 2002.

On July 27, 2008, late night 3 service was restored, operating express between 148th Street and Times Square–42nd Street. In addition, late morning weekday service was increased from running every 6 to 8 minutes to running every 5 to 7 minutes to reduce crowding on the 2. These increases were made as part of an $8.9 million package of systemwide service enhancements.

The Clark Street Tube underwent planned repairs on weekends from June 17, 2017, to June 24, 2018, due to Hurricane Sandy-related damage. The 3 operated only in Manhattan between Harlem-148th Street and 14th Street. During this time, the 4 replaced the 3 in Brooklyn between Atlantic and New Lots Avenues.

On November 17, 2019, the MTA made adjustments to weekday evening 3, 4, and 5 service in order to accommodate planned subway work. Late night 3 service to Times Square started an hour earlier, at 10:30 p.m. instead of 11:30 p.m.; to replace 3 service, 4 service was extended to New Lots Avenue. This change, which was approved by the MTA Board on June 27, 2019, was expected to save the agency $900,000 annually.

In January 2025, overnight 3 service was quietly extended from Times Square–42nd Street to 34th Street–Penn Station, although a few northbound trips continued to enter service at Times Square. One month later, some weekday early morning and late evening trips were rerouted to and from 137th Street–City College as a result of accessibility improvements taking place at 148th Street. Some trips also began ending at 135th Street during the evening. Effective June 8, 2025, 3 service to 137th Street was discontinued.

In May 2025, as part of the 2025–2029 Capital Program, the MTA proposed that the 3 train be rerouted from New Lots Avenue to Flatbush Avenue at its southern end, as it did prior to 1983. A new 8 service, operating along the Broadway–Seventh Avenue Line, would take over the southernmost portion of the 3's route from Franklin Avenue to New Lots Avenue. The proposal, first suggested in 2023 as part of the MTA's 20-year needs assessment, would remove a bottleneck at the Rogers Avenue Junction south of Franklin Avenue, where 5 express and 3 local trains must cross over each other's tracks.

== Route ==
=== Signage history ===
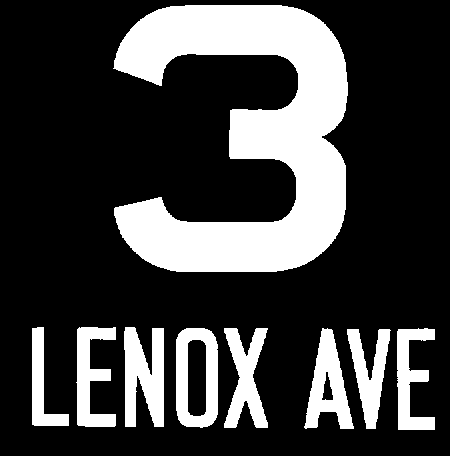
Pre-1967 bullet used on the R12s to R36s

1967–1979 bullet

The current bullet used since 1979

=== Service pattern ===
The following table shows the lines used by the 3, with shaded boxes indicating the route at the specified times:

Line	From	To	Tracks	Times	
Line	From	To	Tracks	all ex. nights	late nights
IRT Lenox Avenue Line (full line)	Harlem–148th Street	110th Street–Malcolm X Plaza	all		
IRT Broadway–Seventh Avenue Line	96th Street	34th Street–Penn Station	express		
IRT Broadway–Seventh Avenue Line	14th Street	Chambers Street	express		
IRT Broadway–Seventh Avenue Line, Brooklyn Branch	Park Place	Borough Hall	all		
IRT Eastern Parkway Line (full line)	Hoyt Street	Crown Heights–Utica Avenue	local		
IRT New Lots Line (full line)	Sutter Avenue–Rutland Road	New Lots Avenue	all		

=== Stations ===
For a more detailed station listing, see the articles on the lines listed above.

Station service legend
Stops all times	Stops 24 hours a day
Stops all times except late nights	Stops every day during daytime hours only
Stops weekdays during the day	Stops during weekday daytime hours only
Stops rush hours only	Stops during weekday rush hours only
Station closed	Station closed
Stops rush hours in the peak direction only	Stops rush hours in the peak direction only (limited service)
Stops rush hours in the reverse-peak direction only	Stops rush hours in the reverse-peak direction only (limited service)
Time period details
Disabled access	Station is compliant with the Americans with Disabilities Act
↑	Station is compliant with the Americans with Disabilities Act in the indicated direction only
↓	Station is compliant with the Americans with Disabilities Act in the indicated direction only
	Elevator access to mezzanine only

3 service	Stations	Disabled access	Subway transfers	Connections/Notes
Manhattan
Lenox Avenue Line
Stops all times	Harlem–148th Street	Disabled access		
Stops all times	145th Street			Access to and from first five cars of southbound trains, and from first five cars of northbound trains only No northbound entry Some southbound a.m. rush hour trips begin at this station
Stops all times	135th Street	Disabled access	2	Some northbound evening trips end at this station
Stops all times	125th Street		2	M60 Select Bus Service to LaGuardia Airport
Stops all times	116th Street		2	
Stops all times	110th Street–Malcolm X Plaza		2	
Broadway–Seventh Avenue Line
Stops all times	96th Street	Disabled access	1 2	
Stops all times	72nd Street	Disabled access	1 2	
Stops all times	Times Square–42nd Street	Disabled access	1 2; 7 <7> (IRT Flushing Line); A C E (IND Eighth Avenue Line at 42nd Street–Port Authority Bus Terminal); N Q R W (BMT Broadway Line); S (42nd Street Shuttle); B D F <F> M (IND Sixth Avenue Line at 42nd Street–Bryant Park, daytime only)	Port Authority Bus Terminal; M34A Select Bus Service
Stops all times	34th Street–Penn Station	Disabled access	1 2	M34 / M34A Select Bus Service; Amtrak, LIRR and NJ Transit at Pennsylvania Station
Stops all times except late nights	14th Street	Disabled access	1 2 F <F> M (IND Sixth Avenue Line at 14th Street); L (BMT Canarsie Line at Sixth Avenue)	PATH at 14th Street; M14A/D Select Bus Service
Stops all times except late nights	Chambers Street	Disabled access	1 2	
Brooklyn branch
Stops all times except late nights	Park Place	Elevator access to mezzanine only	2 A C (IND Eighth Avenue Line at Chambers Street); E (IND Eighth Avenue Line at World Trade Center); R W (BMT Broadway Line at Cortlandt Street)	PATH at World Trade Center
Stops all times except late nights	Fulton Street	Disabled access	2; 4 5 (IRT Lexington Avenue Line); A C (IND Eighth Avenue Line); J Z (BMT Nassau Street Line)	PATH at World Trade Center
Stops all times except late nights	Wall Street		2	M15 Select Bus Service; Staten Island Ferry at Whitehall Terminal
Brooklyn
Stops all times except late nights	Clark Street	Elevator access to mezzanine only	2	NYC Ferry: East River and South Brooklyn routes (at Old Fulton Street and Furman Street)
Stops all times except late nights	Borough Hall	Disabled access	2; 4 5 (IRT Eastern Parkway Line); R W (BMT Fourth Avenue Line at Court Street)	
Eastern Parkway Line
Stops all times except late nights	Hoyt Street	↓	2	Station is ADA-accessible in the southbound direction only.
Stops all times except late nights	Nevins Street		2 4 5	
Stops all times except late nights	Atlantic Avenue–Barclays Center	Disabled access	2 4 5 B Q (BMT Brighton Line); D N R W (BMT Fourth Avenue Line)	LIRR Atlantic Branch at Atlantic Terminal
Stops all times except late nights	Bergen Street		2 4	
Stops all times except late nights	Grand Army Plaza		2 4	
Stops all times except late nights	Eastern Parkway–Brooklyn Museum	Disabled access	2 4	
Stops all times except late nights	Franklin Avenue–Medgar Evers College		2 4 5 S (BMT Franklin Avenue Line at Botanic Garden)	
Stops all times except late nights	Nostrand Avenue		2 4 5	B44 Select Bus Service
Stops all times except late nights	Kingston Avenue		2 4 5	
Stops all times except late nights	Crown Heights–Utica Avenue	Disabled access	2 4 5	B46 Select Bus Service
New Lots Line
Stops all times except late nights	Sutter Avenue–Rutland Road		2 4 5	B15 bus to JFK Int'l Airport
Stops all times except late nights	Saratoga Avenue		2 4 5	
Stops all times except late nights	Rockaway Avenue		2 4 5	
Stops all times except late nights	Junius Street		2 4 5 Out-of-system transfer with MetroCard/OMNY: L (BMT Canarsie Line at Livonia Avenue)	
Stops all times except late nights	Pennsylvania Avenue		2 4 5	
Stops all times except late nights	Van Siclen Avenue		2 4 5	
Stops all times except late nights	New Lots Avenue		2 4 5	B15 bus to JFK Int'l Airport
