= B45 (New York City bus) =

Bus route in Brooklyn, New York

b45
- St. Johns Place Line
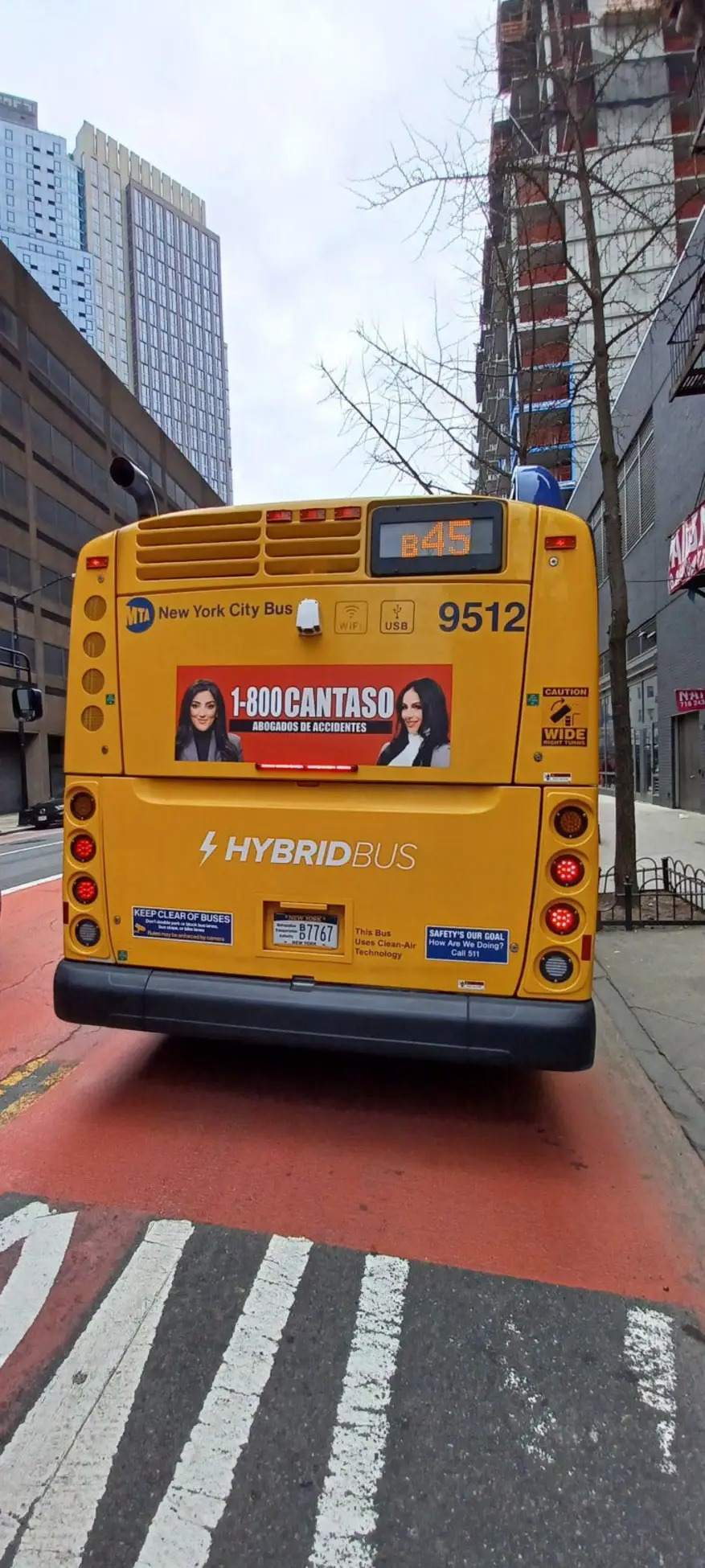
- A 2021 New Flyer XDE40 (9512) on the B45 in Downtown Brooklyn

Overview
- System: MTA Regional Bus Operations
- Operator: New York City Transit Authority
- Garage: East New York Depot
- Vehicle: New Flyer Xcelsior XD40; New Flyer Xcelsior XDE40; New Flyer Xcelsior XE40; OBI Orion VII NG HEV
- Began service: 1877 (streetcar); 1947 (bus)

Route
- Locale: Brooklyn, New York, U.S.
- Communities served: Crown Heights, Prospect Heights, Fort Greene, Boerum Hill, Downtown Brooklyn
- Landmarks served: Brooklyn Borough Hall, Atlantic Terminal, Barclays Center
- Start: Downtown Brooklyn – Court Street
- Via: St. Johns Place
- End: Crown Heights – Ralph Avenue
- Length: 4.8 miles (7.7 km)
- Other routes: B65 Bergen/Dean Streets

Service
- Operates: All times, except late nights
- Annual patronage: 841,607 (2025)
- Transfers: Yes
- Timetable: B45

The B45 is a bus route that constitutes a public transit line operating in Brooklyn, New York City, mainly along Atlantic Avenue, Washington Avenue, Sterling Place, and St. Johns Place between Downtown Brooklyn and Crown Heights. It is operated by the MTA New York City Transit Authority. Its precursor was a streetcar line that began operation in 1877, and was known as the St. Johns Place Line. The route became a bus line in 1947.

== Route ==
The westbound B45 begins at St. Johns Place and Ralph Avenue and runs down St. Johns Place until Rogers Avenue, where it makes a right turn on Rogers Avenue and then a left turn onto Sterling Place. It runs down Sterling Place until Washington Avenue, where it makes a right turn onto Washington Avenue. It runs down Washington Avenue until Atlantic Avenue, where it makes a left turn. It runs down Atlantic Avenue until Flatbush Avenue, where it makes a right turn. It runs down Flatbush Avenue until Livingston Street, where it makes a left turn. It then runs down Livingston Street until Boerum Place, where it makes a right turn onto Boerum Place, a left turn onto Joralemon Street, a left turn onto Court Street and one last left turn back onto Livingston Street, where it terminates.

The eastbound B45 begins at Livingston Street and Court Street and runs down Livingston Street until Flatbush Avenue, where it makes a right turn onto Flatbush. Because of left turns from Flatbush Avenue to Atlantic Avenue being banned, the B45 takes a slight detour via Fourth and Atlantic Avenues. It runs down Atlantic Avenue until Washington Avenue, where it makes a right turn. It runs down Washington Avenue until St. Johns Place, where it makes a left turn. It runs down St. Johns Place until Buffalo Avenue, where it makes a left turn. It makes a right turn onto St Marks Avenue and makes another right turn onto Ralph Avenue. It then runs down Ralph Avenue until St. Johns Place, where it shares its eastern terminus with the B65.

== History ==
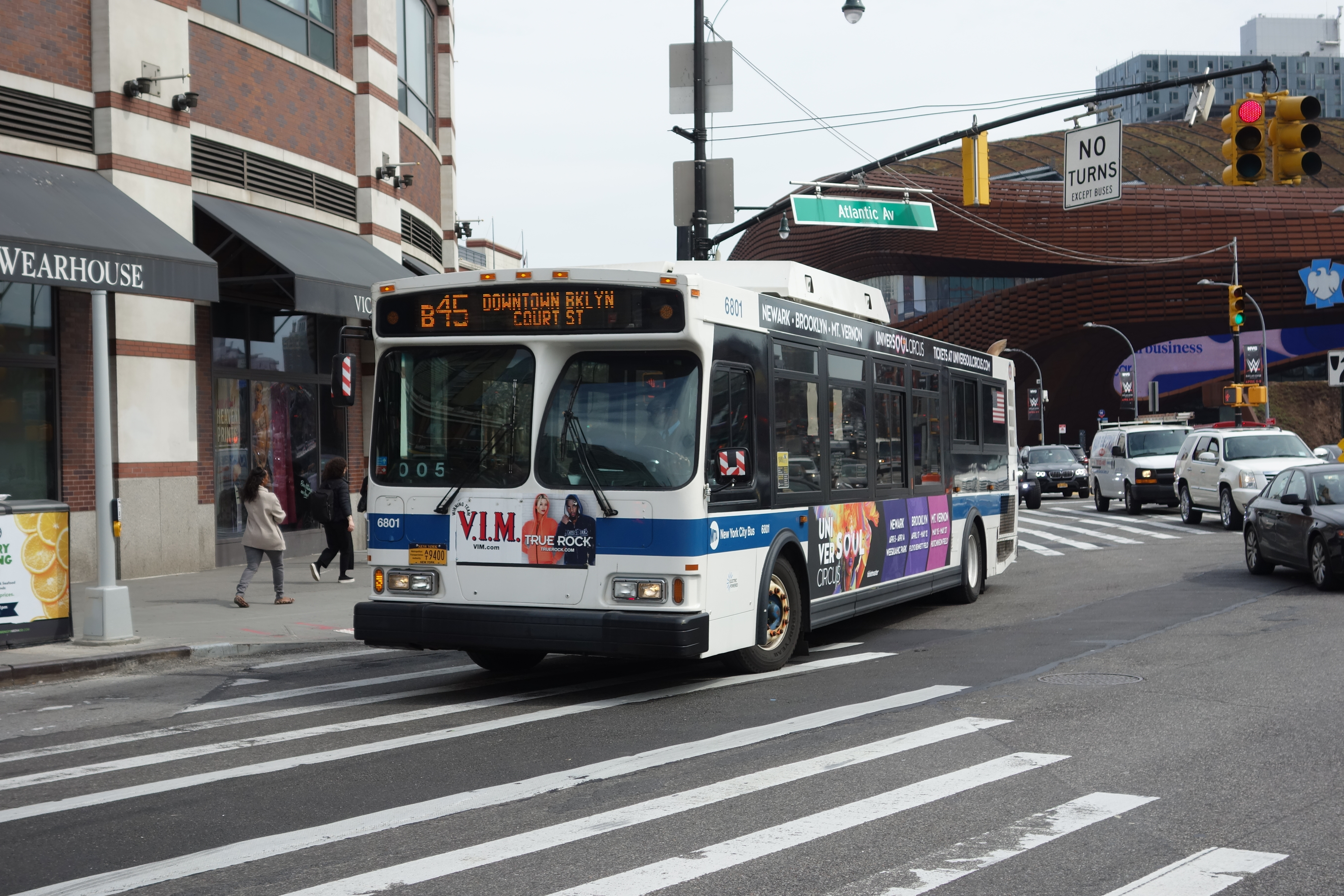
A 2007 Orion VII OG HEV (6801) on the Downtown Brooklyn-bound B45 near Atlantic Terminal in March 2019

In 1877, the Atlantic Avenue Railroad leased its main line east of Fifth Avenue (just east of Flatbush Avenue) to the Long Island Rail Road as a branch of their system to downtown Brooklyn. However, the Atlantic Avenue Railroad still wanted to serve the area east of downtown, and it opened a new track on the south side of Atlantic Avenue from Fifth Avenue to Washington Avenue, and then a line along Washington Avenue and Sterling Place (then Butler Street) to Nostrand Avenue, on June 11, 1883.

The rest of the line was built by the Nassau Electric Railroad, which had the right to build from Hamilton Ferry to City Line along Union Street, St. Johns Place (then Douglass Street), East New York Avenue, and Liberty Avenue. The Nassau Electric leased the Atlantic Avenue on April 5, 1896, and never built the portion between the end of the Union Street Line at Grand Army Plaza and the crossing of their Ocean Avenue Line at Rogers Avenue, one block west of Nostrand Avenue. Instead, the Atlantic Avenue Railroad's Butler Street Line was truncated to Rogers Avenue and extended via St. Johns Place and East New York Avenue, and, once the lease was consummated, cars were operated from Fulton Ferry to Sheepshead Bay (leaving the line at Rogers Avenue) and to City Line, where they soon connected with the Long Island Electric Railway and New York and Long Island Traction Company.

Buses were substituted for streetcars on August 24, 1947, and replaced by trolley buses on September 16, 1948, only for buses to be gradually restored between 1954 and 1959. The bus route was truncated to the intersection with the Bergen Street Line and Ralph Avenue Line by 1969.

On December 1, 2022, the MTA released a draft redesign of the Brooklyn bus network. As part of the redesign, the B45 would be extended east to the Ralph Avenue station. Westbound service between New York Avenue and Rogers Avenue would be rerouted to Sterling Place to avoid a narrow two-way section of St. Johns Place. Closely spaced stops would also be eliminated.

== Incidents ==
On September 21, 2018, an eastbound B45 bus with no passengers skidded on a right turn to Ralph Avenue, crashing into a building. No one was seriously hurt, but the driver was suffering from trauma.

== See also ==
- List of streetcar lines in Brooklyn
