= City Hall station (IRT Lexington Avenue Line) =

New York City Subway station, 1904–1945

City Hall
- Former New York City Subway station
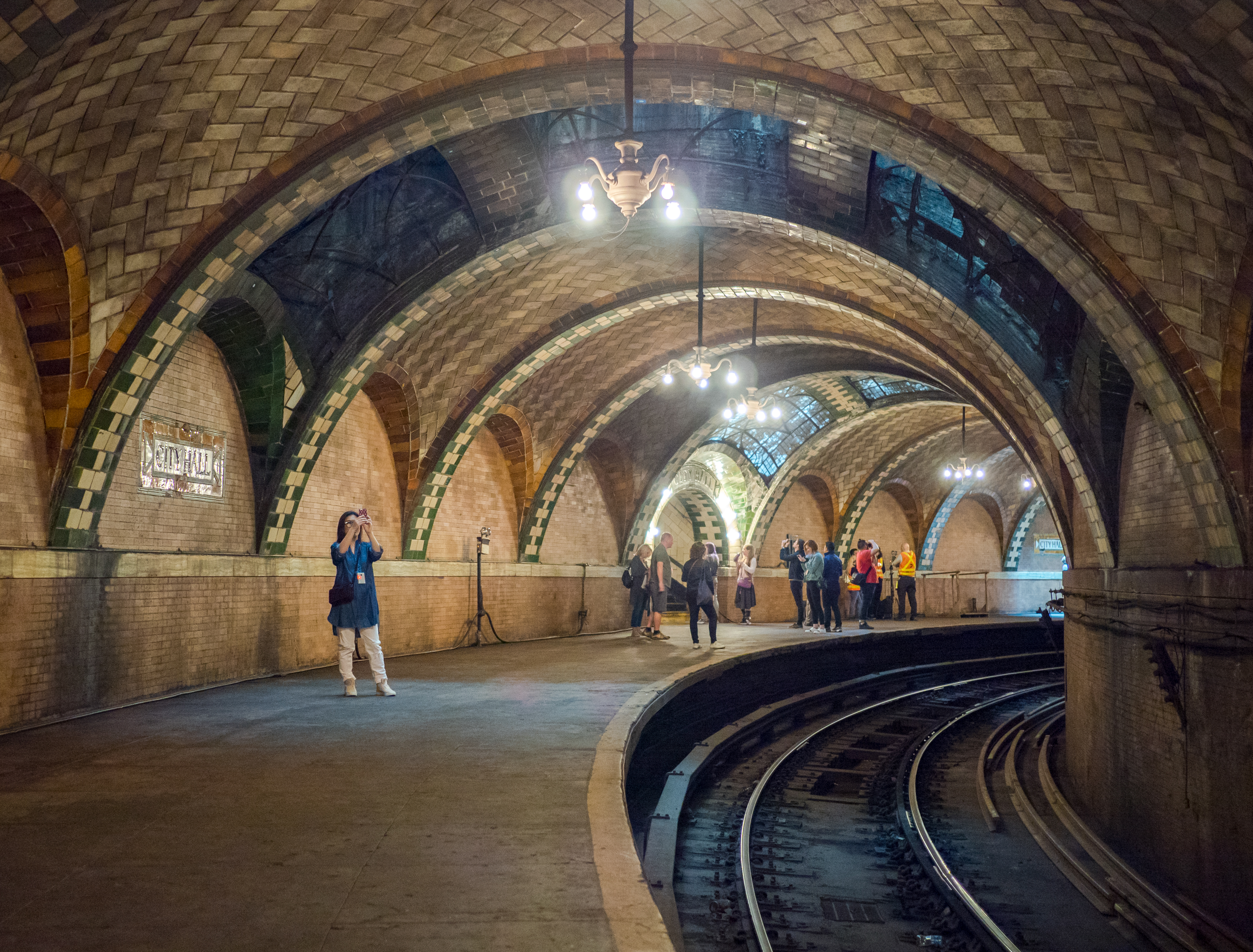
- Station platform in 2018

Station statistics
- Address: Park Row & City Hall Park; New York, NY 10007
- Borough: Manhattan
- Locale: Civic Center
- Division: A (IRT)
- Line: IRT Lexington Avenue Line
- Services: None (abandoned)
- Structure: Underground
- Platforms: 1 side platform
- Tracks: 1 balloon loop

Other information
- Opened: October 27, 1904; 122 years ago
- Closed: December 31, 1945; 80 years ago
- Former/other names: City Hall Loop

Station succession
- Next north: Brooklyn Bridge–City Hall
- Next south: (Terminal)
Track layout
- City Hall Subway Station (IRT)
- U.S. National Register of Historic Places
- New York State Register of Historic Places
- New York City Landmark
- Location: New York City, New York
- Coordinates: 40°42′45″N 74°00′24″W
- Built: 1904
- Architect: Heins & LaFarge
- Architectural style: Romanesque Revival
- MPS: New York City Subway System MPS
- NRHP reference No.: 04001010
- NYCL No.: 1096

Significant dates
- Added to NRHP: September 17, 2004
- Designated NYSRHP: July 20, 2004
- Designated NYCL: October 23, 1979

The City Hall station, also known as City Hall Loop station, is a closed station on the IRT Lexington Avenue Line of the New York City Subway. It is located under City Hall Park, next to New York City Hall, in the Civic Center neighborhood of Manhattan in New York City. The station was constructed for the Interborough Rapid Transit Company (IRT) as the southern terminal of the city's first subway line, which was approved in 1900. Construction of the segment of the line that includes the City Hall station started on September 12 of the same year. The station opened on October 27, 1904, as one of the original 28 stations of the New York City Subway. As ridership grew, it was deemed infeasible to lengthen the original platform to accommodate ten-car trains. The station was closed on December 31, 1945, because of its proximity to the Brooklyn Bridge station. Since then, the platform has remained unused (except for occasional tours and events), while its track continues to be used as a turning loop.

The City Hall station, with its single track and curved side platform, was the showpiece of the original IRT subway. The single platform and mezzanine feature Guastavino tile, skylights, colored glass tilework, and brass chandeliers. The Rafael Guastavino-designed station is unique in the system for the usage of Romanesque Revival architecture. The tunnel passing through the City Hall station is still used as a turning loop for the 6 and <6> trains and can be seen from passing trains. The station is a New York City designated landmark and is listed on the National Register of Historic Places.

== History ==
=== Construction and opening ===
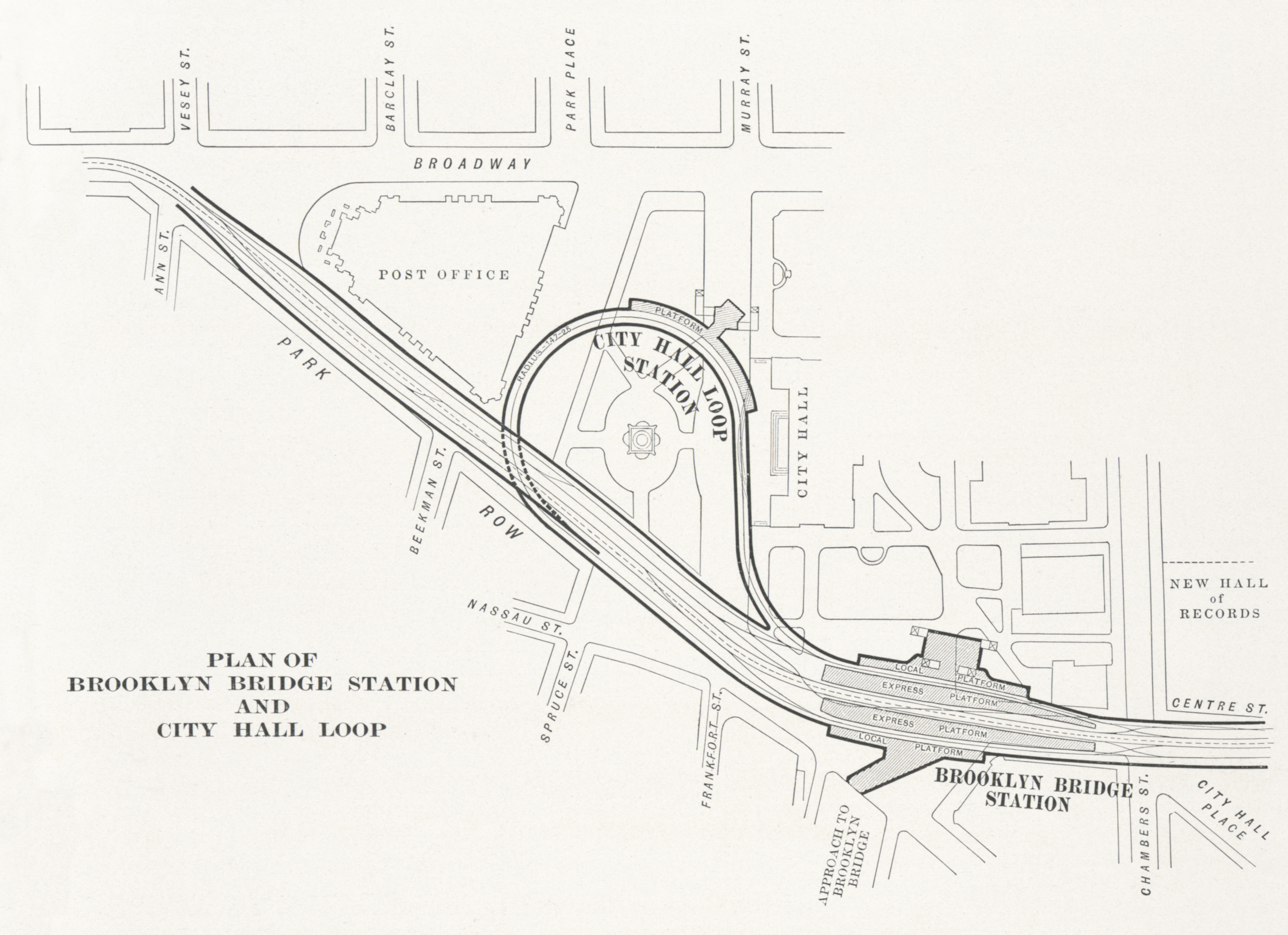
Plan of the station

Planning for a subway line in New York City dates to 1864. However, development of what would become the city's first subway line did not start until 1894, when the New York State Legislature passed the Rapid Transit Act. The subway plans were drawn up by a team of engineers led by William Barclay Parsons, the Rapid Transit Commission's chief engineer. They called for a subway line from New York City Hall in lower Manhattan to the Upper West Side, where two branches would lead north into the Bronx. A plan was formally adopted in 1897, and all legal conflicts over the route alignment were resolved near the end of 1899. The Rapid Transit Construction Company, organized by John B. McDonald and funded by August Belmont Jr., signed the initial Contract 1 with the Rapid Transit Commission in February 1900, in which it would construct the subway and maintain a 50-year operating lease from the opening of the line. In 1901, the firm of Heins & LaFarge was hired to design the underground stations. Belmont incorporated the Interborough Rapid Transit Company (IRT) in April 1902 to operate the subway.

The station had always been envisioned as a terminal with loop tracks. The initial plans in the 1890s called for a multi-track loop, extending beneath the City Hall Post Office and Courthouse, which was then at the southern corner of City Hall Park. The loop was planned to have either two tracks (on two levels) or four tracks. When the plans for the IRT line were changed in 1898 to allow the express tracks to go to Brooklyn as part of the subway's Contract 2, the planned City Hall station was changed to a single-track local station, thereby avoiding a grade crossing with the express tracks. Under the 1898 iteration of the plan, the loop was to diverge from the line at the south end of Centre Street, traveling west under City Hall Park, south under Broadway, and then northeast under Park Row. In addition, tracks from the loop would have led to the post office building. East of the loop, there were two express tracks and two storage tracks.

==== Construction of the loop ====
A formal groundbreaking ceremony was performed at City Hall on March 24, 1900, pursuant to the contract's requirements. The ceremony was officiated by then-Mayor Robert Van Wyck. Degnon-McLean Contracting Company was awarded the contract for Section 1, from the City Hall loop to Chambers Street. Work began promptly after the groundbreaking. The tunnel was built using a cut and cover method, with steel beams supporting a concrete roof made of jack arches. A further change was requested in September 1900, which would provide more room for the loop on the Park Row side.

Plans for the loop under City Hall Park were modified in January 1901, providing for a shortened loop. By that March, the City Hall Loop was planned to be built just north of the post office, rather than around it. At the end of the month, trees in City Hall Park were being removed in preparation for the loop's construction.

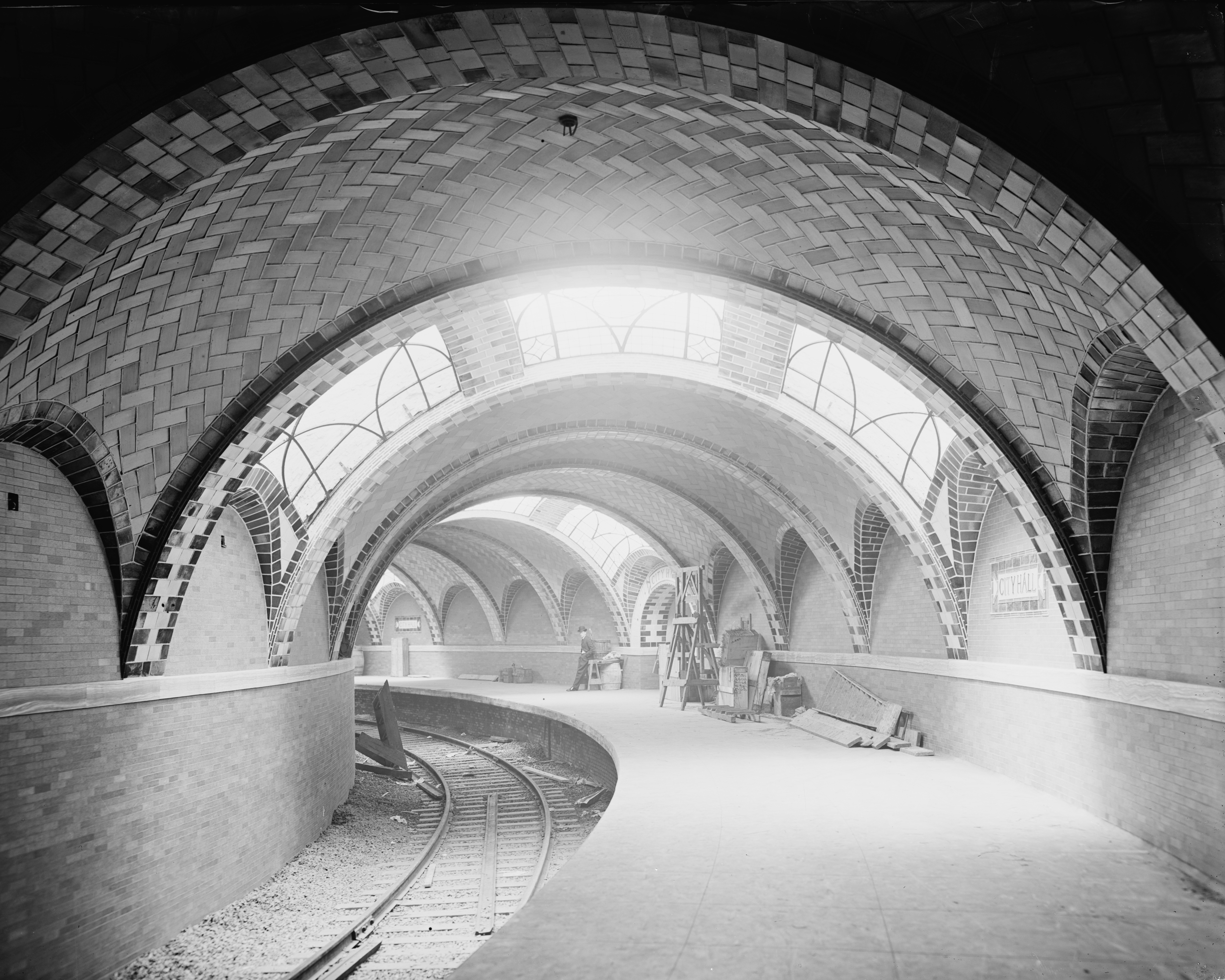
View of the station in the early 1900s, before its completion

The portion of the loop in City Hall Park was excavated starting in April 1901. The trees were removed from the park using derricks. One worker was killed that May when a derrick boom in front of the subway excavation was knocked loose. Sand from the 500-foot-long (152 m) excavation was sold to builders who sought the sand for its "good quality". The short section adjacent to the post office could not be constructed because the Treasury Secretary had not approved the work, leading the IRT to request approval from Congress. The entirety of the loop within City Hall Park had been excavated by that August. Most of the excavation was covered over shortly afterward, although a small part remained open to facilitate work on the station.

In late 1901, the contractors began excavating the tunnel under Park Row, which would carry both the northbound track of the loop and the express tracks to Brooklyn. Work on the station was placed on hold because the station's concrete vaults were difficult to pour during winter.

By February 1902, three-fourths of the work for the station's side walls had been completed, and work had started on the vaults. The tunnel under Park Row had been fully excavated and was being covered with steel beams. Most of the loop was completed by late 1902, except for the section under the post office. The contractors excavated the remainder of the loop after they were given temporary permission, in December 1902, to use the vaults underneath the post office.

==== Completion ====
By late 1903, the tilework of the sidewalks and the station's staircase were completed. Construction materials were being stored in the station's only entrance and exit. The subway was nearly complete, but the IRT Powerhouse and the system's electrical substations were still under construction, delaying the system's opening. On New Year's Day 1904, mayor George B. McClellan Jr. and a group of wealthy New Yorkers gathered at the City Hall station and traveled 6 mi (9.7 km) to 125th Street using handcars. The IRT conducted several more handcar trips afterward. The first train to run on its own power traveled from 125th Street to City Hall in April 1904.

The City Hall station opened on October 27, 1904, as the southern terminal station of the original 28-station New York City Subway line to 145th Street on the West Side Branch, now the Broadway–Seventh Avenue Line. At the time, the station was called "City Hall Loop". Prior to the opening, more than 15,000 people were issued passes for the first series of rides from the City Hall station's platform. McClellan attended the opening ceremonies, which began at 1:00 p.m. The first subway train departed from City Hall at precisely 2:34 p.m., with McClellan at the controls. President A. E. Orr of the Rapid Transit Board requested that all New Yorkers join in the celebration by blowing whistles and ringing bells. The new line carried 27,000 passengers for free until 6 p.m., and another 125,000 passengers paid to ride the subway in the six-hour period that followed.

=== Operation ===
==== Early years ====
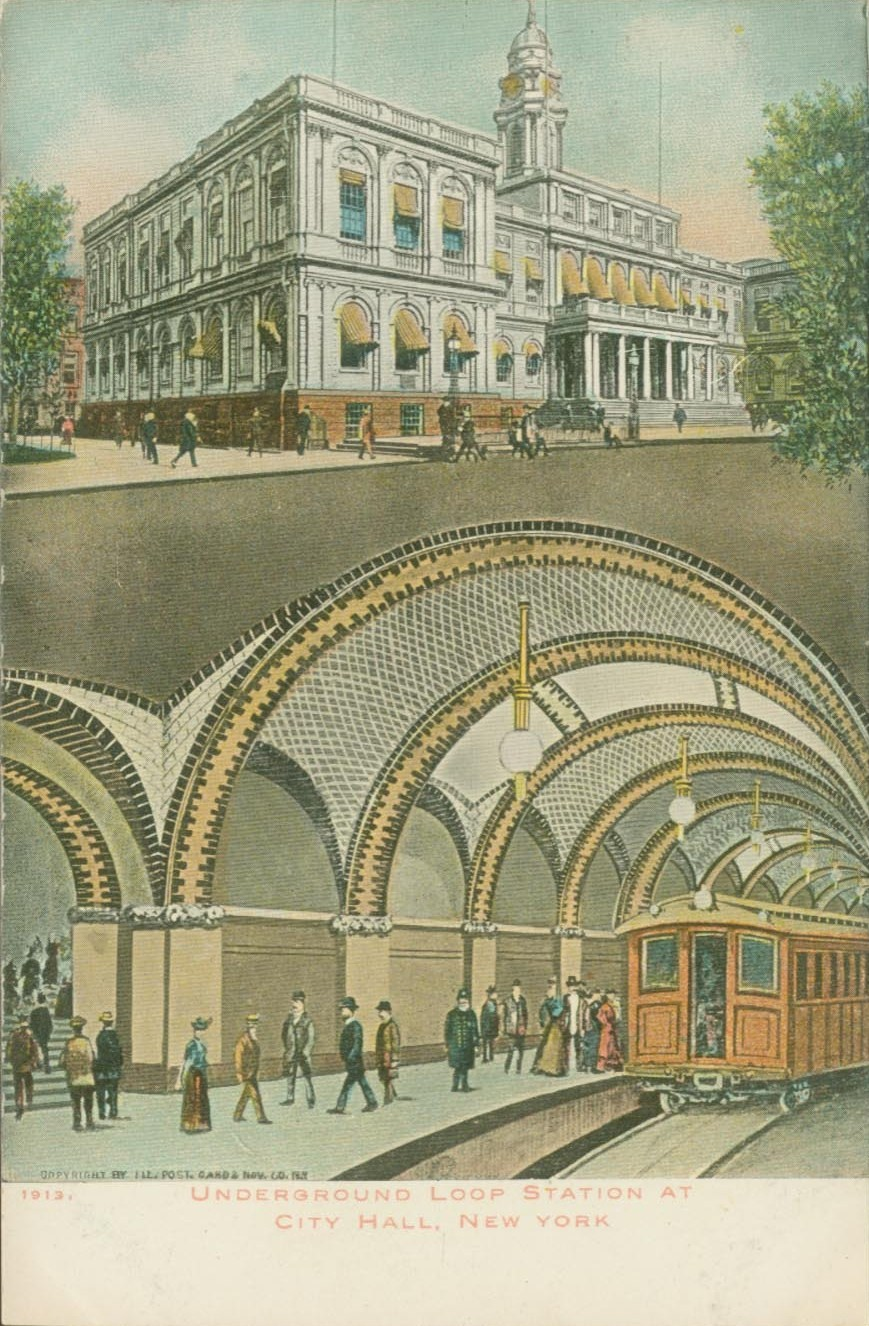
Postcard showing City Hall and the station, c. 1913

Because of the limited number of entrances to the City Hall station, it was served exclusively by local trains, which also stopped at the much larger Brooklyn Bridge station. All express trains terminated at Brooklyn Bridge and did not go around the loop. Furthermore, the City Hall station was originally an entrance-only station; disembarking passengers had to go to the Brooklyn Bridge station. After the Fulton Street station opened in January 1905, the City Hall Loop was served by local trains to the West Side Branch at all times and by local trains to 145th Street on the East Side Branch (now Lenox Avenue Line) during the daytime. By July 1905, East Side local trains to 145th Street ran to City Hall at all times, while West Side locals bypassed this station and went to Bowling Green or South Ferry. To address ventilation issues, the IRT installed ventilation grates in City Hall Park in mid-1906. By the end of the year, West Side locals ran to City Hall during rush hours, and East Side locals ran to City Hall at all times.

Not long after the station opened, the IRT started displaying advertisements in the station, which was highly controversial but was allowed under the IRT's contract to operate the route. The New York City government initially did not find the ads to be problematic, but public outcry led the city to file a lawsuit to force the IRT to remove the ads. In 1907, the New York Supreme Court ruled that the IRT was allowed to keep the ads. To address overcrowding, in 1909, the New York Public Service Commission proposed lengthening the platforms at stations along the original IRT subway. As part of a modification to the IRT's construction contracts made on January 18, 1910, the company was to lengthen station platforms to accommodate ten-car express and six-car local trains. The City Hall station was not lengthened, but the platforms at other stations were extended, and six-car local trains began operating in October 1910.

In 1918, the Lexington Avenue Line opened north of Grand Central–42nd Street, and the original line was divided into an H-shaped system. All local trains were sent via the Lexington Avenue Line, running along the Pelham Line in the Bronx. In 1938, as part of a remodeling of City Hall Park, city parks commissioner Robert Moses proposed relocating the entrances of the IRT's City Hall station and those of the Brooklyn–Manhattan Transit Corporation (BMT)'s adjacent City Hall station. The city government took over the IRT's operations on June 12, 1940.

==== Decline ====
Increased subway ridership led to longer trains, and thus longer platforms, in the years after the subway's construction. The City Hall station, built on a tight curve, would have been difficult to lengthen, and it was also quite close to the far busier Brooklyn Bridge–City Hall station. In addition, the new, longer trains had center doors in each car, which were an unsafe distance from the platform edge. Movable platform extensions were installed to fill the gap. By the 1930s, the New York Herald Tribune reported that the City Hall station was little used, "and many of the younger generation have never seen it". During World War II, shortly before the station's closure, the skylights were blacked out with tar for safety.

In its final years, the City Hall station was not open at night and on Sundays, when trains continued to South Ferry. The majority of passengers used the Brooklyn Bridge station, which was only about 600 ft (180 m) away. The Brooklyn Bridge IRT station provided both local and express service, including trains to Brooklyn, and it was much closer to the Brooklyn Bridge streetcar terminal and the BMT's Park Row elevated station. The city also wanted to operate ten-car trains after taking over the IRT, but the City Hall station could only fit six cars. Given the extensive renovations that would have been required to bring the station up to modern standards and the fact that the city wanted to improve City Hall Park by removing the entrance kiosks, the city decided to close the station instead. The final day of service was December 31, 1945. The station recorded 255,000 entries in its final year, or about 800 entries per day. By contrast, the Brooklyn Bridge station had 14 million entries the same year.

=== Post-closure ===
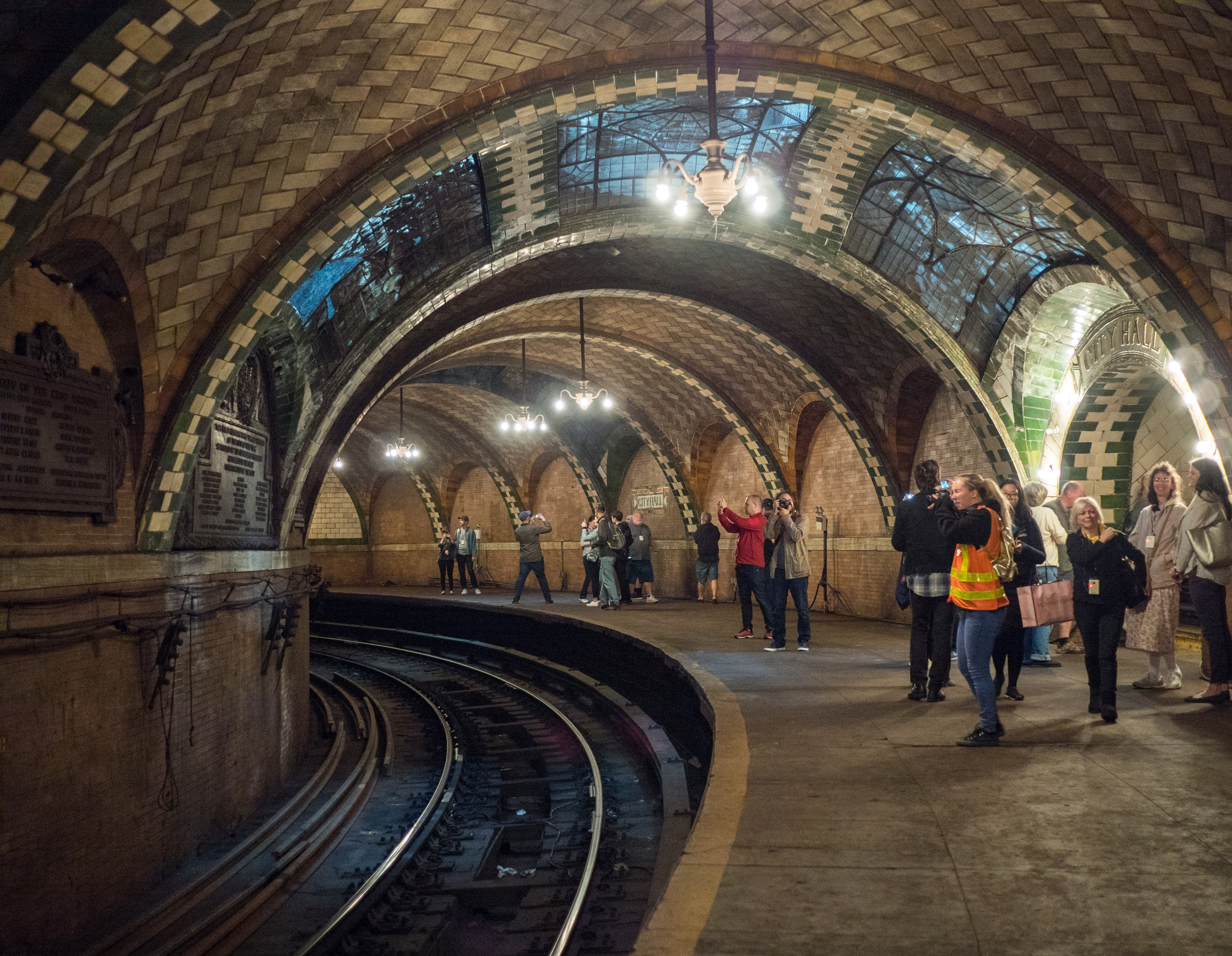
View of the City Hall station from the rear of the platform in 2018

In 1965, the City Hall station was considered as a possible location for a transit museum. In 1976, the New York City Transit Authority reopened the abandoned Court Street station in Brooklyn as the New York Transit Exhibit, which eventually became the New York Transit Museum (NYTM). The station occasionally was used for tours after its closure, including in 1979 for an event celebrating the subway's 75th anniversary. In 1979, the New York City Landmarks Preservation Commission designated the City Hall station as a city landmark, along with eleven other stations on the original IRT.

==== Proposals for reuse ====
By the 1980s, Mayor Ed Koch suggested allowing a restaurant to open in the old station as part of a larger plan to renovate City Hall Park. As part of this plan, replicas of the IRT's original cast-iron entrance kiosks would have been built. Civic leaders and city officials visited the station in July 1986. Ross Sandler, the city's transportation commissioner and a proponent of the station's reopening, lamented that the station was a "designated landmark that people can't visit". The plan had still not advanced over a year later, when parks commissioner Henry J. Stern said the station's restoration was dependent on whether funding to renovate City Hall Park was secured. Ultimately, the idea was overruled by the New York City Police Department, which expressed concerns that the station's location beneath New York City Hall was a security vulnerability.

In April 1995, the NYTM sought funding to reopen the station as a branch of the museum. The New York City Transit Authority (NYCTA) estimated that about $1 million would be needed just to reopen the station, though the NYTM wished to raise $3.5 million. The museum had secured a $750,000 federal grant and a $350,000 grant from the NYCTA by that November. By 1997, some $2 million in state and federal funding had been allocated. Had the NYTM branch been built, it would have contained two entrances from street level. Early the next year, MTA officials started refurbishing the station's corridors and offered up to $5 million for underground repairs to City Hall Park, which at the time was being renovated. However, in late 1998, the administration of mayor Rudy Giuliani rejected the proposal, citing security risks in the area around City Hall after terrorist bombings in Nairobi and Dar es Salaam. Plans for the museum annex were abandoned, and museum tours ceased for several years. The MTA did spend $2 million to repair structural issues at the City Hall station.

==== 21st century ====
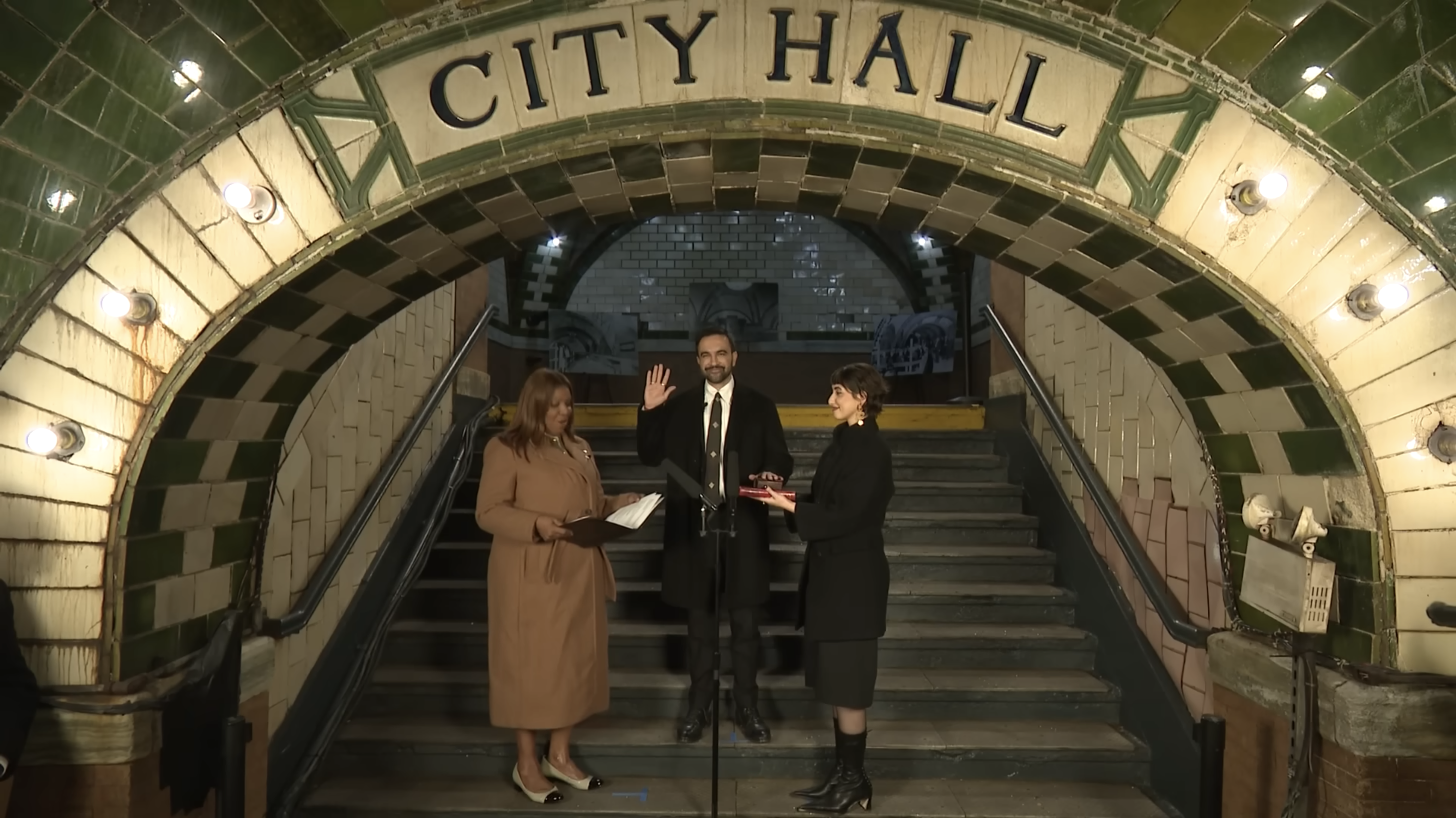
Zohran Mamdani was sworn in as mayor of New York City in the City Hall station shortly after midnight on January 1, 2026.

By 2001, the NYCTA planned to temporarily reopen the station three years later for the subway's 100th anniversary. The station was listed on the National Register of Historic Places in 2004. For the subway's Centennial Celebration the same year, one of the street entrances was restored, and the station was opened for the duration of the celebration. The idea of an annex to the Transit Museum was then proposed but due to security concerns (with City Hall being just above the station) the idea was dismissed. Other than that, the station was used only as an emergency exit. By the mid-2000s, the staff of the Transit Museum were again conducting tours of the station; only NYTM members were allowed on these tours. Unlike other abandoned New York City Subway stations, there was generally little graffiti or dust in the City Hall station.

The station remained in good condition in 2019, though only one of the original skylights remained. Due to the COVID-19 pandemic in New York City, the NYTM suspended its tours of the station between 2020 and 2023. After Zohran Mamdani won the 2025 New York City mayoral election, his mayoral transition team used the City Hall station for his formal swearing-in ceremony on January 1, 2026. Mamdani said he had chosen to be sworn in there because it was a "physical monument" to New York City's ambitious past.

== Station layout ==
The station features a single balloon loop track along a concave side platform, which has a length of 240 feet (73 m), designed to fit five subway cars. The track has a radius of curvature of 147.25 ft (44.88 m), which resulted in two-foot-wide (0.6 m) gaps between the train doors and the platform. The fare control area was on a mezzanine slightly above platform level, connected to the platform by a single, wide staircase. Intended as the showpiece of the entire subway system, the City Hall station was designed in a completely different style from other stations on the IRT subway.

According to the Railroad Gazette, all of the City Hall station's public areas were designed "with a view to the beauty of their appearance, as well as to their efficiency", since the station was "a great public work". One observer wrote that there was "not a straight line" in the entire station when it was completed. The travel magazine Travel + Leisure ranked the station 12th in its list of "the most beautiful subway stations in the world" in November 2009. A replica of the station was built for the feature film Fantastic Beasts And Where To Find Them. According to NYTM officials, the station inspired the main characters' lair in the 1990 film Teenage Mutant Ninja Turtles.

=== Design ===
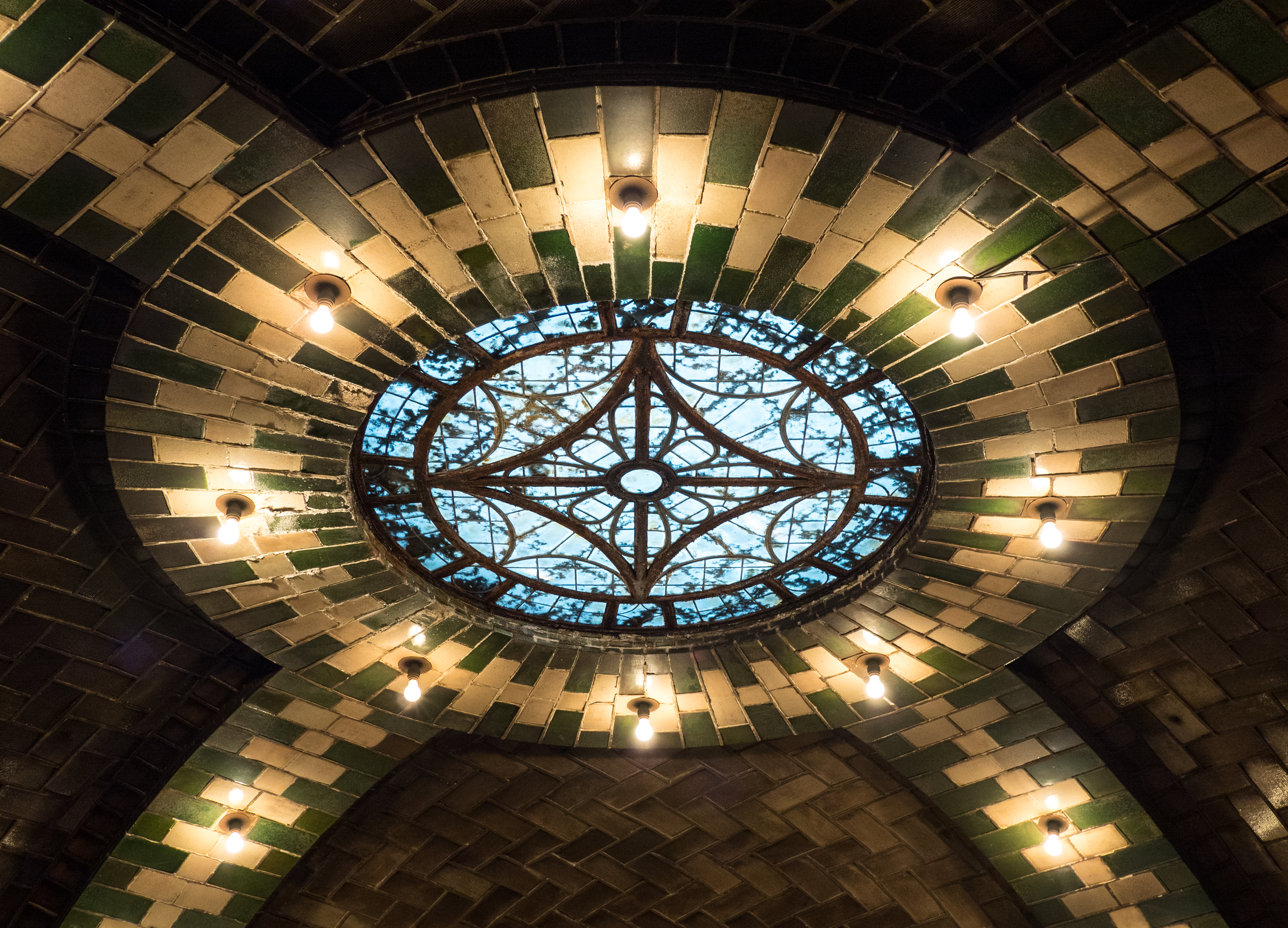
Ceiling tiles and skylight

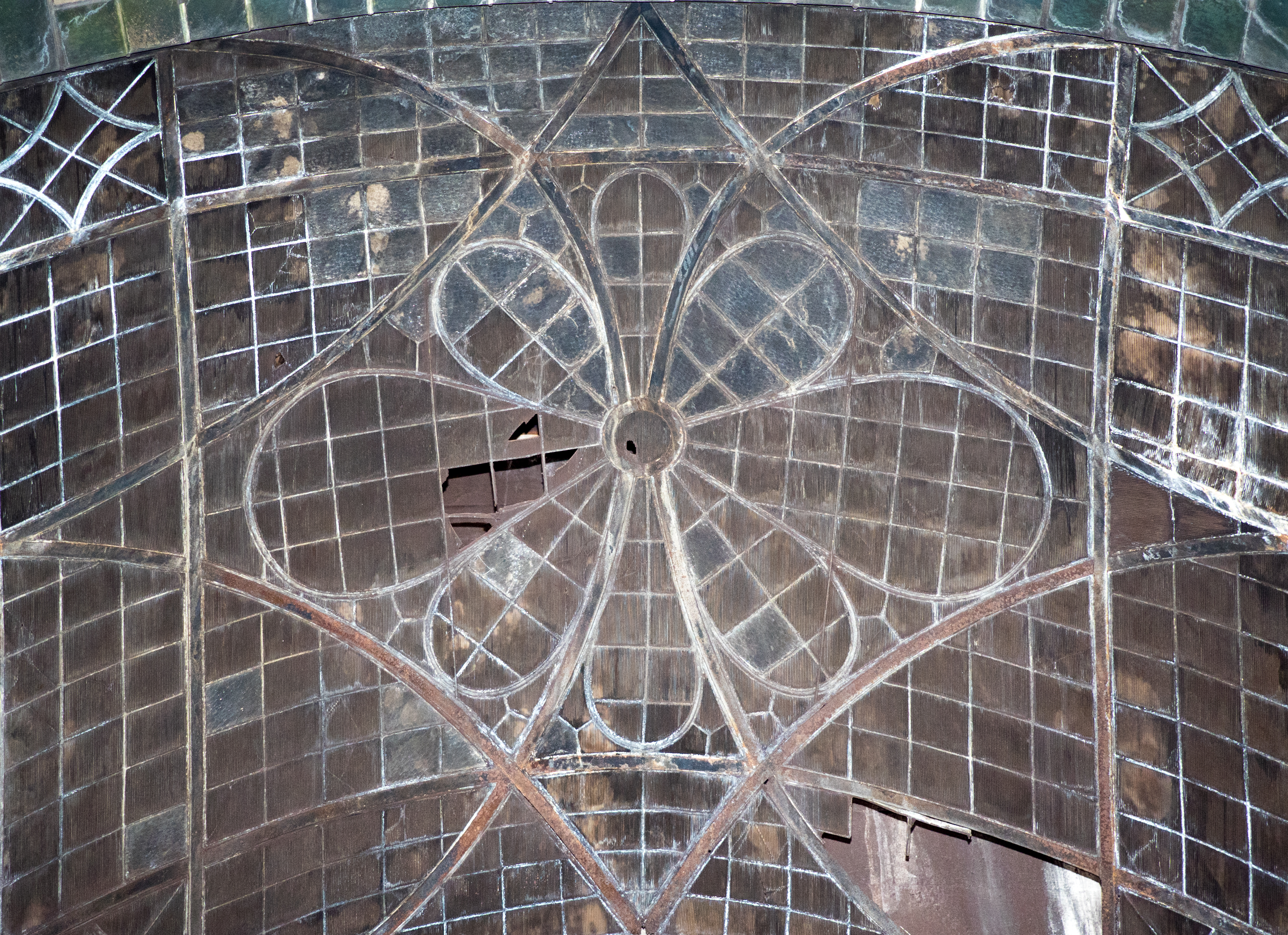
Ceiling skylight

The station was designed by Rafael Guastavino, and it makes extensive use of classic Guastavino tile to sheathe its soaring roof arches. The main consulting architects were Heins & LaFarge, which designed all of the other IRT stations. This station is unusually elegant in architectural style, and is unique among the original IRT stations, employing Romanesque Revival architecture. The station was constructed by cut-and-cover construction. The station shell contains a foundation of concrete no less than four inches (10 cm) thick. There is a one-inch (2.5 cm) gap between the shell's wall and the station walls, which are made of four-inch-thick (10 cm) brick covered over by a tiled finish.

The ceiling is made of twelve Guastavino vaults. The ceiling surfaces are composed of white tiles, with green and brown tiles along the perimeter of each ceiling vault. The vaults were constructed of thin terracotta tiles bonded with a string mortar, added in successive layers to form a thin structural vault of great strength. Three vaults had leaded glass skylights, which opened upward to vault lights in City Hall Park. The skylights, designed with floral tracery, were blacked out during World War II and were restored in the 2000s. Additional lighting was supplied by twelve chandeliers hung from the center of the vaults, which contain floral motifs and nickel finishes. The chandeliers near the skylights have five arms, while the others have four.

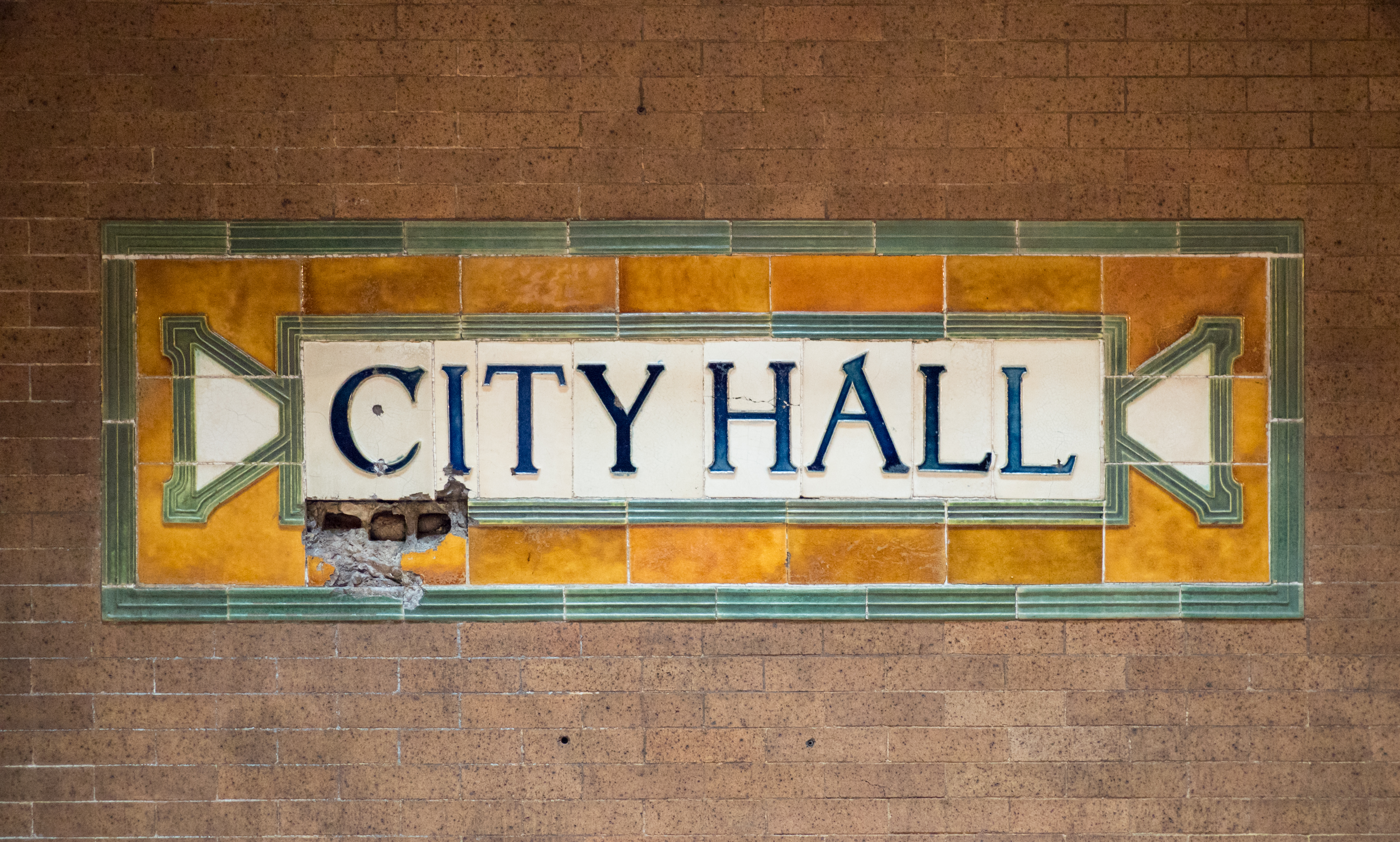
Faience station name plaque

The platform is made of poured concrete. The platforms still contain markings from where the platform extensions were formerly installed. The top half of the wall along the platform, under each of the arches, consists of Roman brick. At the bottom half of each wall is a marble course topped by a brick wainscoting and another marble course. On the platform walls are three blue-on-white faience plaques with letters reading city hall, flanked by a pair of triangles and surrounded by green and buff tiles. Two of these plaques are rectangular, installed on the walls under the brick arches. The third is curved and is installed on an archway above the staircase that leads to the mezzanine. The mosaic tiles at all original IRT stations were manufactured by the American Encaustic Tile Company, which subcontracted the installations at each station. On the trackside wall, facing the platform, are three bronze plaques with the names of important figures involved in the original IRT's construction, including Parsons, McDonald, Belmont, Rapid Transit Subway Construction Company officials, engineering staff, mayors, commissioners, and city comptrollers. Gutzon Borglum designed the plaques.

The walls of the staircase between mezzanine and platform level are covered with yellow, green, and blue tile. The mezzanine contains a vaulted ceiling with a quoin pattern, consisting of brown trim with white and green tiles. The center of the mezzanine has an oculus skylight, with light bulbs around the skylight. The walls of the mezzanine contain large glass tiles interspersed with opaque ceramic tile. Wire conduits and pipes have been installed onto the mezzanine walls. The mezzanine once had an ornamented oak ticket booth, which has since been removed.

=== Track layout ===
North of the City Hall station, the IRT Lexington Avenue Line carries four tracks. From west to east, these are the downtown local track, the downtown express track, the uptown express track, and the uptown local track. The loop connects the downtown and uptown local tracks. The track is slightly canted toward the inner wall of the loop. When the loop was completed, Scientific American magazine wrote that "one of the more important tasks of constrictive engineering which the subway presented is solved".

South of the Brooklyn Bridge station, there is a switch on the downtown local track, allowing trains to leave service and enter either of two storage tracks. Trains in service turn onto a balloon loop, continuing past the abandoned side platform on the west side of the loop, and returning to the Brooklyn Bridge station on the uptown local track. The uptown and downtown express tracks pass above the loop, continuing south.

=== Exits and access ===
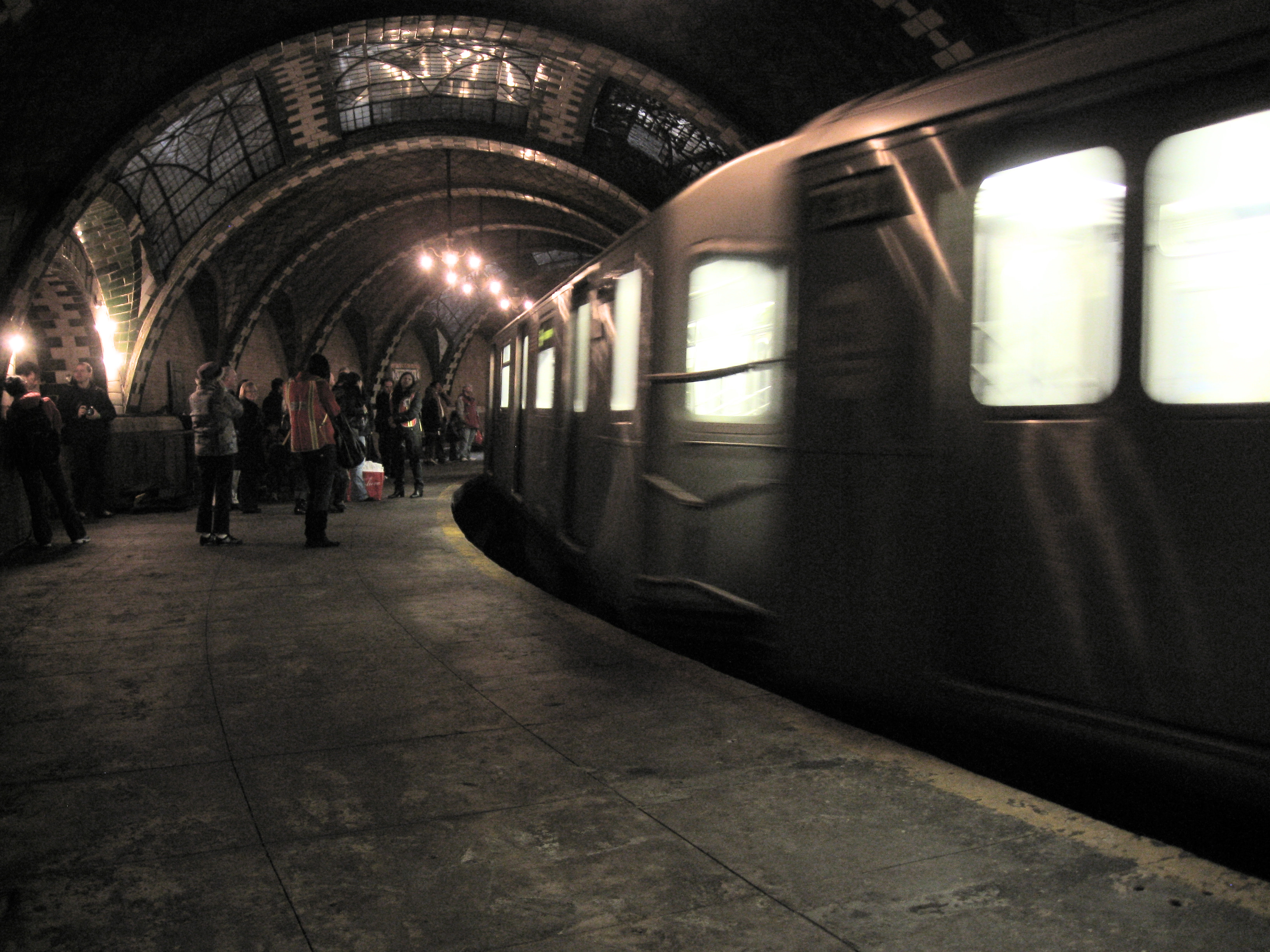
A 6 train of R142A cars passing through the station in 2008

There were two staircases from outside the City Hall building to the mezzanine of the station, each measuring 6 ft (1.8 m) wide. Heins & LaFarge designed entrance and exit "kiosks" for the City Hall station and the other underground IRT stations. These structures were extremely ornate structures made of cast iron and glass, being inspired by those on the Budapest Metro, which themselves were inspired by ornate summer houses called "kushks". Brooklyn-based manufacturer Hecla Iron Works manufactured the kiosks. Exit kiosks were distinguished by their four-sided pyramidal wire-glass skylights, while entrance kiosks had domed roofs with cast-iron shingles. The kiosks also carried ventilation shafts for the stations' restrooms, which were generally directly underneath each kiosk. One critic said the station's original entrance and exit kiosks gave "a foreign appearance" to City Hall Park and compared the vaults to the interior of a mosque.

After the City Hall station closed, one staircase was covered over with a slab. The other staircase was covered with a set of metal cellar doors in the ground. On the surface, all that can be seen is a concrete slab inset with glass tiles, the skylights for the platform below. This patch of concrete is in the middle of a grove of dogwoods in front of City Hall, close to Broadway. At street level, in the pavement in front of City Hall, a plaque commemorates the groundbreaking for the subway in 1900.

The station can be viewed by passengers who stay on the 6 and <6> services as they travel around the loop to head back uptown. Under MTA policy, all riders on southbound 6 and <6> trains must leave the train at Brooklyn Bridge, but the policy is rarely enforced; by the 2010s, the MTA was intentionally allowing riders to stay on the train. Artificial lighting has often been dimmed to save electricity, but the skylights provide some illumination during the daytime. The loop track is classified as a revenue track, since trains can carry passengers through the loop. The announcement programs on the R142A subway cars, which were formerly used on the 6 and <6> services, announced that trains would turn around via the loop and stop on the northbound platform at Brooklyn Bridge. (Note: The older R62As, which make up the entire 6 and <6> services' fleet as of 2018, use manual announcements.)

== See also ==
- List of closed New York City Subway stations
- List of New York City Subway stations in Manhattan
- List of New York City Designated Landmarks in Manhattan below 14th Street
- National Register of Historic Places listings in Manhattan below 14th Street
- Beach Pneumatic Transit, in the basement of the nearby Rogers Peet Building
