= Nostrand Avenue Line =

Nostrand Avenue Line may refer to the following public transit lines:

- IRT Nostrand Avenue Line, a rapid transit line of the IRT division of the New York City Subway running under Nostrand Avenue, Brooklyn, New York
- Nostrand Avenue Line (surface), a public transit line in Brooklyn, New York, running mostly along Nostrand Avenue between Sheepshead Bay and Williamsburg; originally a streetcar line, now a bus route
