= President Street–Medgar Evers College station =

New York City Subway station in Brooklyn

President Street– Medgar Evers College
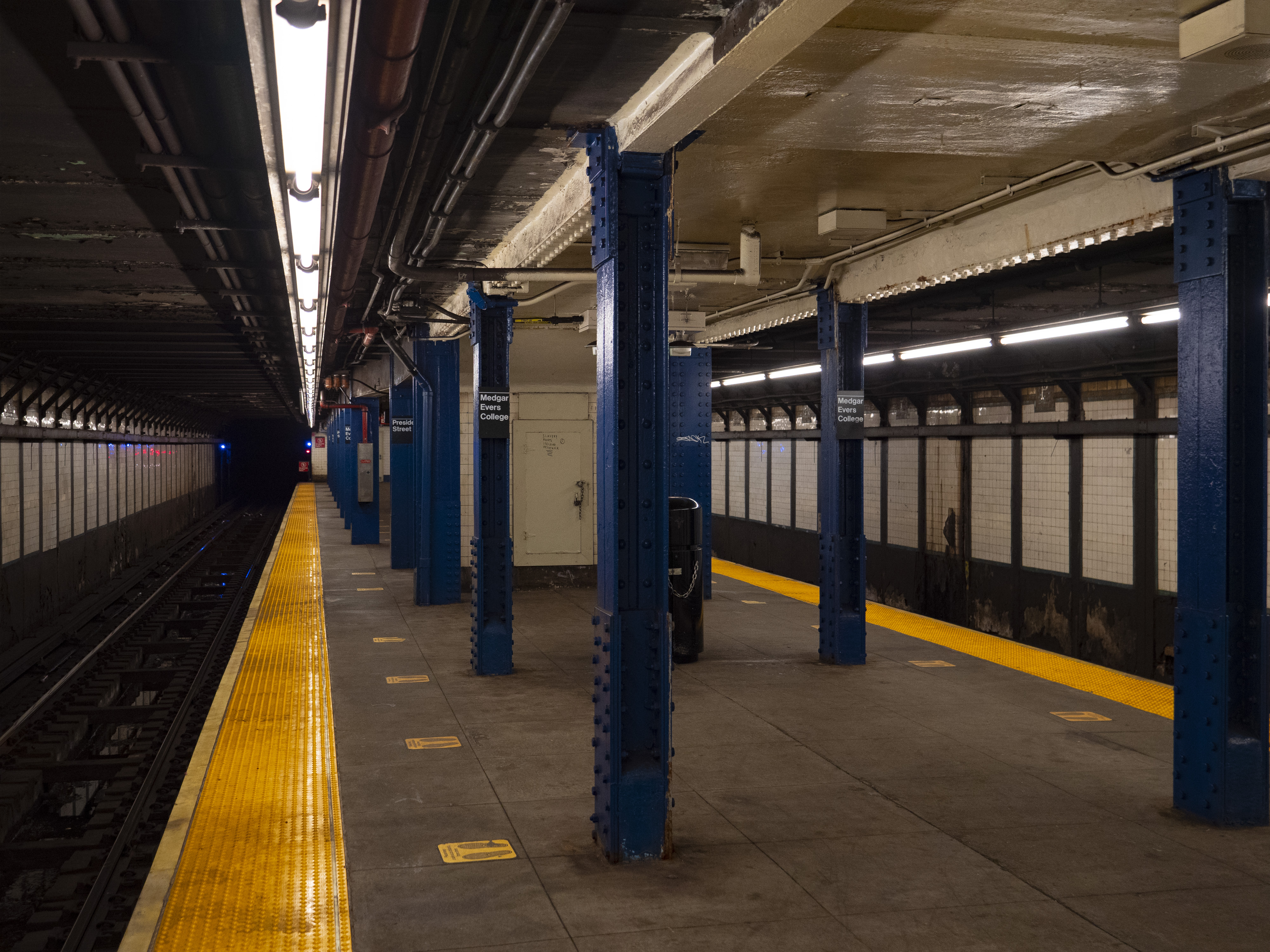

Station statistics
- Address: President Street & Nostrand Avenue; Brooklyn, New York
- Borough: Brooklyn
- Locale: Crown Heights
- Coordinates: 40.668009°N 73.950691°W
- Division: A (IRT)
- Line: IRT Nostrand Avenue Line
- Services: 2 (all times); 5 (weekdays only)
- Transit: NYCT Bus: B44
- Structure: Underground
- Platforms: 1 island platform
- Tracks: 2

Other information
- Opened: August 23, 1920; 106 years ago
- Accessible: No; planned
- Former/other names: President Street (1920–2020)

Traffic
- 2025: 800,941 ▲6.9%
- Rank: 340 out of 423
Services
Preceding station	New York City Subway	Following station
Franklin Avenue–Medgar Evers College 2 5 services split	2 (New York City Subway service) 5 (New York City Subway service)	Sterling Street 2 5 toward Flatbush Avenue–Brooklyn College
Location
Location within New York City Subway
Location within New York City
Location within New York
Track layout
Street map
Station service legend
Symbol	Description
Stops all times	Stops all times
Stops weekdays during the day	Stops weekdays during the day
Stops weekdays and weekday late nights	Stops weekdays and weekday late nights
Stops all times except late nights	Stops all times except late nights

The President Street–Medgar Evers College station (originally President Street station) is a station on the IRT Nostrand Avenue Line of the New York City Subway. Located at the intersection of President Street and Nostrand Avenue in Brooklyn, the station is served by the 2 train at all times and the 5 train on weekdays.

== History ==
The Dual Contracts, which were signed on March 19, 1913, were contracts for the construction and/or rehabilitation and operation of rapid transit lines in the City of New York. The Dual Contracts promised the construction of several lines in Brooklyn. As part of Contract 3, the IRT agreed to build a subway line along Nostrand Avenue in Brooklyn. The construction of the subway along Nostrand Avenue spurred real estate development in the surrounding areas. The Nostrand Avenue Line opened on August 23, 1920, and the President Street station opened along with it.

During the 1950s the platform was lengthened at its southern end to be able to accommodate 10-car trains which are 514 feet (157 m) long.

President Street, along with the Franklin Avenue station on the IRT Eastern Parkway Line, are the two closest stations to the City University of New York's Medgar Evers College. In 2019, a bill to add the college's name to both stations' names was passed in the New York state legislature and signed into law. The name of the President Street station was officially changed to President Street–Medgar Evers College on October 1, 2020, both to reflect the station's proximity to the college and to honor the college's namesake, civil rights figure Medgar Evers.

As part of its 2025–2029 Capital Program, the MTA has proposed making the station wheelchair-accessible in compliance with the Americans with Disabilities Act of 1990.

== Station layout ==
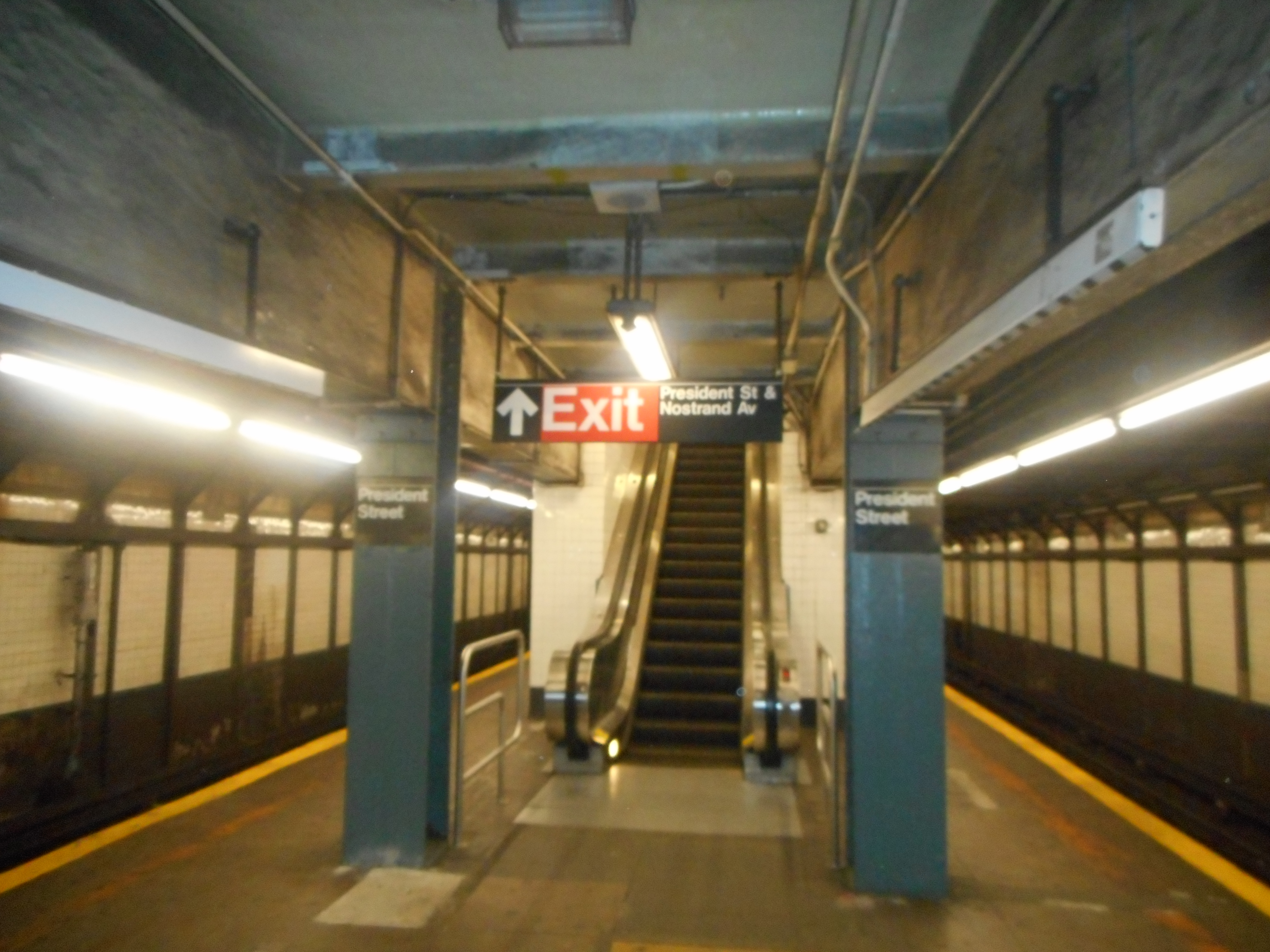
Platform before the renaming

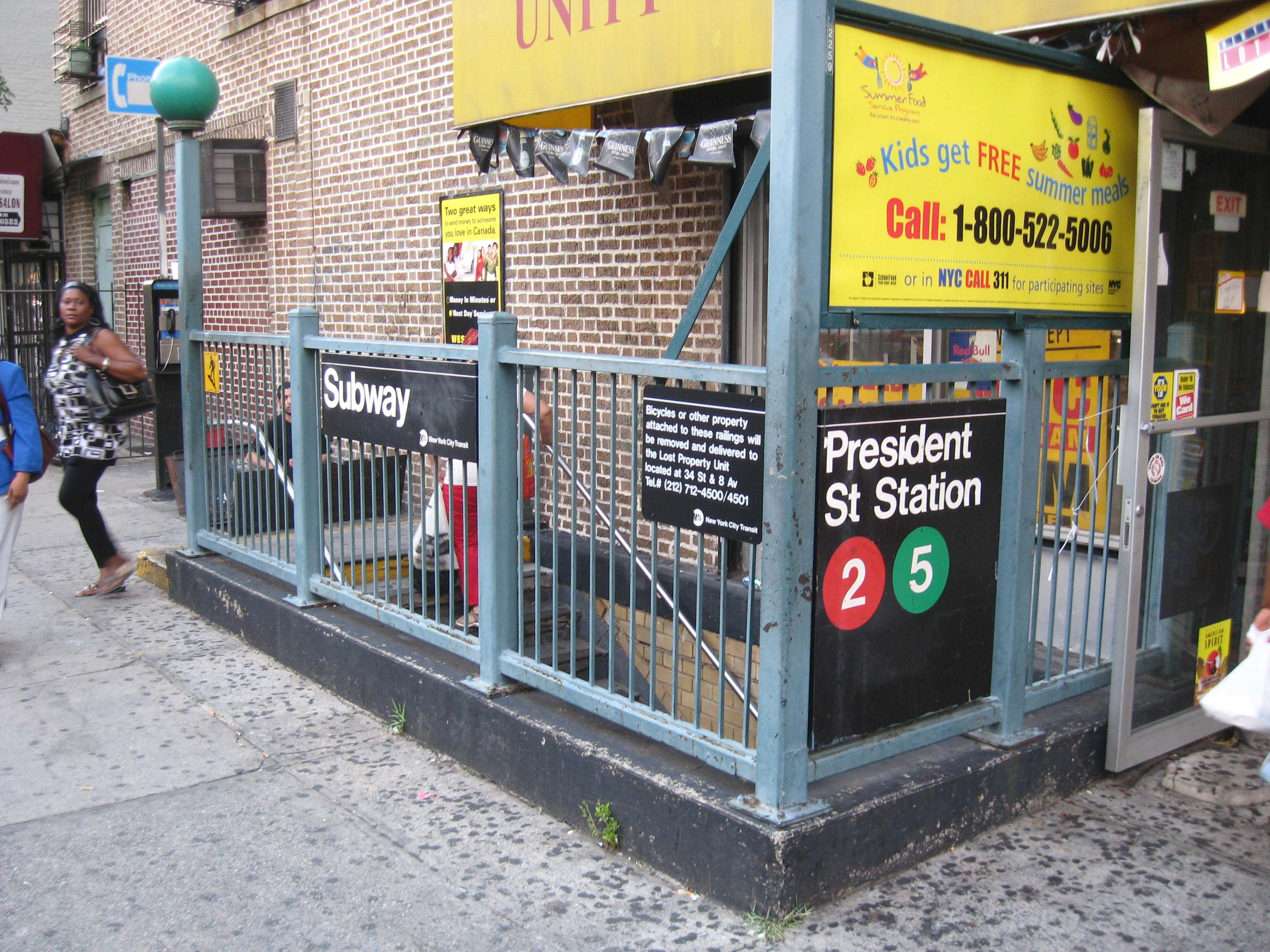
Stair to station

This deep underground station is the northernmost on the IRT Nostrand Avenue Line and the only one that has one island platform and two tracks. All stations to the south are set up as two track and two side platforms. To the north, the IRT Nostrand Avenue Line curves west and joins the local tracks of the IRT Eastern Parkway Line, where there are crossovers to the express tracks in an interlocking called Rogers Junction. The Nostrand Avenue station on that line is just two blocks north. The station is served by the 2 train at all times and by the 5 train on weekdays during the day. It is between Sterling Street to the south and Franklin Avenue to the north.

Fixed platform barriers, which are intended to prevent commuters falling to the tracks, are positioned near the platform edges. This station's platform has wide I-beam columns painted in blue on both sides at regular intervals with alternating ones having the standard black station name plate with white lettering. The track walls have their original Dual Contracts trim line with "P" tablets on it at regular intervals for "President." Towards the south end of the station, where the platform was extended in the 1950s to accommodate the current standard IRT train length of 510 feet (160 m), the walls have "PRESIDENT ST" in white sans serif font on a blue border.

=== Exits ===
The station's only entrance/exit is near the north end of the platform. A single double-flight staircase and up-only escalator go up three stories to a small waiting area, where a turnstile bank provides entrance/exit from the system. Outside fare control, there is a token booth and two street stairs going up to both northern corners of President Street and Nostrand Avenue.
