= Sterling Street station =

New York City Subway station in Brooklyn

Sterling Street
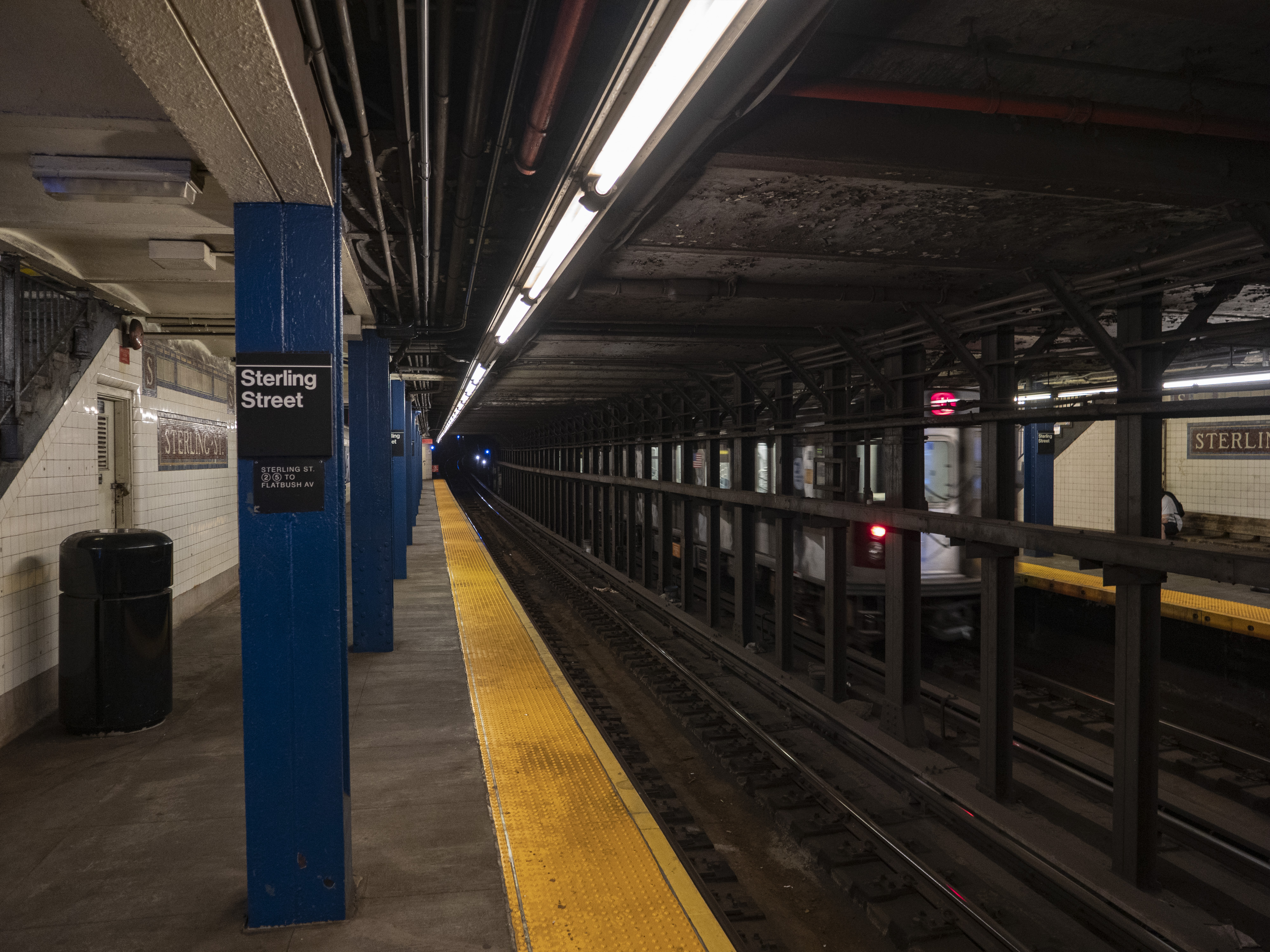
- An R142 5 train leaving the northbound platform

Station statistics
- Address: Sterling Street & Nostrand Avenue; Brooklyn, New York
- Borough: Brooklyn
- Locale: Prospect Lefferts Gardens
- Coordinates: 40.663061°N 73.950863°W
- Division: A (IRT)
- Line: IRT Nostrand Avenue Line
- Services: 2 (all times); 5 (weekdays only)
- Transit: NYCT Bus: B43, B44, B44 SBS
- Structure: Underground
- Platforms: 2 side platforms
- Tracks: 2

Other information
- Opened: August 23, 1920; 106 years ago
- Accessible: No; planned

Traffic
- 2025: 1,298,035 ▲3.4%
- Rank: 261 out of 423
Services
Preceding station	New York City Subway	Following station
President Street–Medgar Evers College 2 5 via Franklin Avenue–Medgar Evers College	2 (New York City Subway service) 5 (New York City Subway service)	Winthrop Street 2 5 toward Flatbush Avenue–Brooklyn College
Location
Location within New York City Subway
Location within New York City
Location within New York
Track layout
Street map
Station service legend
Symbol	Description
Stops all times	Stops all times
Stops weekdays during the day	Stops weekdays during the day
Stops weekdays and weekday late nights	Stops weekdays and weekday late nights
Stops all times except late nights	Stops all times except late nights

The Sterling Street station is a station on the IRT Nostrand Avenue Line of the New York City Subway. Located in Prospect Lefferts Gardens, Brooklyn at the intersection of Sterling Street and Nostrand Avenue, the station is served by the 2 train at all times and the 5 train on weekdays.

== History ==
The Dual Contracts, which were signed on March 19, 1913, were contracts for the construction and/or rehabilitation and operation of rapid transit lines in the City of New York. The Dual Contracts promised the construction of several lines in Brooklyn. As part of Contract 4, the IRT agreed to build a subway line along Nostrand Avenue in Brooklyn. The construction of the subway along Nostrand Avenue spurred real estate development in the surrounding areas. The Nostrand Avenue Line opened on August 23, 1920, and the Sterling Street station opened along with it.

The platforms at Sterling Street were lengthened during the 1950s to 514 feet (157 m) so that the platforms could accommodate 10-car trains.

As part of its 2025–2029 Capital Program, the MTA has proposed making the station wheelchair-accessible in compliance with the Americans with Disabilities Act of 1990.

== Station layout ==
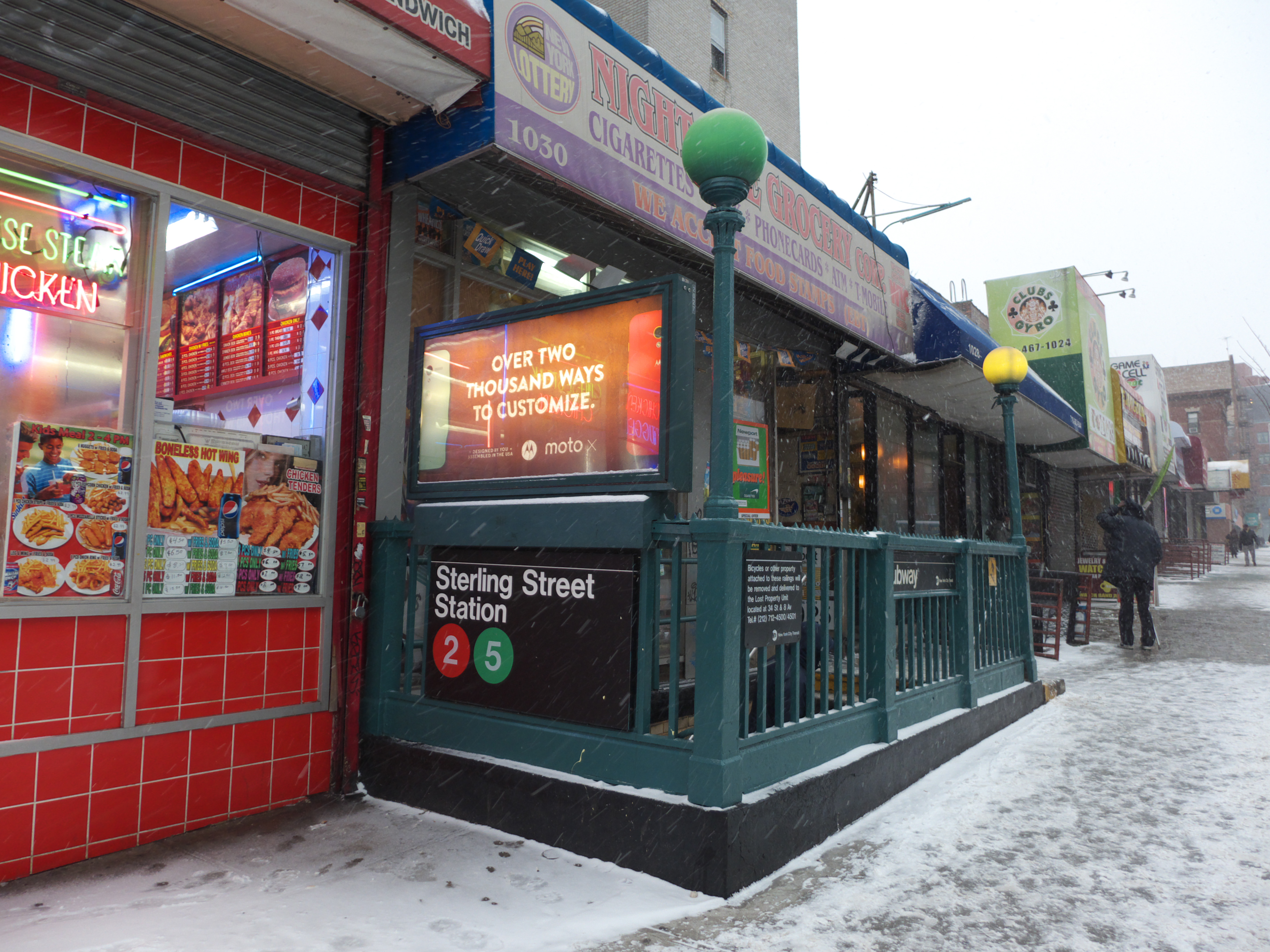
Western entrance to the station

The underground station has two tracks and two side platforms. The station is served by the 2 train at all times and by the 5 train on weekdays during the day. It is between Winthrop Street to the south and President Street–Medgar Evers College to the north. The platforms have original 1920s Dual Contracts era tiling. The name tablets have "STERLING ST." in white letters on a brown background with a blue and brown border. The tile's trim line consists of light brown coloring with a border composed of a mix of dark blue and brown coloring. An intermediate line of green runs between these two borders.

Fixed platform barriers, which are intended to prevent commuters falling to the tracks, are positioned near the platform edges. The platforms are offset at the north end, where they were extended in the 1960s (completed in 1964) and tiling from that time period was installed. The name tablets here run at regular intervals and have "STERLING STREET" in white letters on a brown background. Both platforms and the mezzanine have light blue I-beam columns at regular intervals. The mezzanine walls have four different large frames of drawings and paintings. It is not known who the author or what the name of this artwork is.

This is the only other station with two side platforms on the IRT Nostrand Avenue Line that allows a free transfer between directions (besides Flatbush Avenue, which uses a U-shaped set of side platforms). All stations to the south, including Flatbush Avenue, have their fare control areas on platform level.

=== Exits ===
The station's only entrance/exit is a small mezzanine above the platforms towards the northern end. Inside fare control, it has two staircases going down to each platform, a newsstand, and a turnstile bank. Outside fare control, it has token booth and two street staircases leading up to both northern corners of Nostrand Avenue and Sterling Street.
