= Winthrop Street station =

New York City Subway station in Brooklyn

Winthrop Street
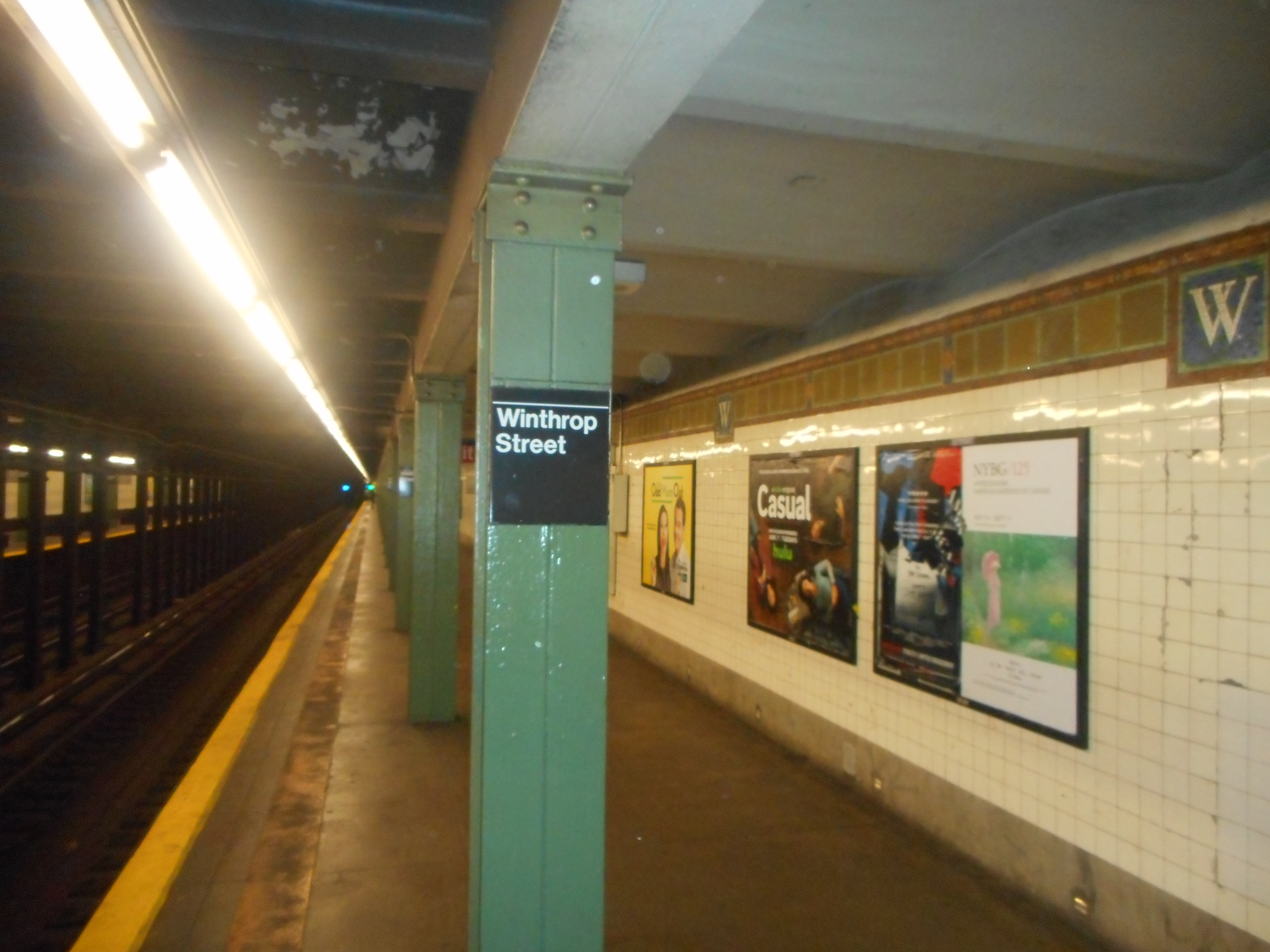

Station statistics
- Address: Winthrop Street & Nostrand Avenue; Brooklyn, New York
- Borough: Brooklyn
- Locale: Prospect Lefferts Gardens
- Coordinates: 40.657039°N 73.950262°W
- Division: A (IRT)
- Line: IRT Nostrand Avenue Line
- Services: 2 (all times); 5 (weekdays only)
- Transit: NYCT Bus: B12, B44, B44 SBS
- Structure: Underground
- Platforms: 2 side platforms
- Tracks: 2

Other information
- Opened: August 23, 1920; 106 years ago

Traffic
- 2025: 1,793,809 ▲8.2%
- Rank: 200 out of 423
Services
Preceding station	New York City Subway	Following station
Sterling Street 2 5 via Franklin Avenue–Medgar Evers College	2 (New York City Subway service) 5 (New York City Subway service)	Church Avenue 2 5 toward Flatbush Avenue–Brooklyn College
Location
Location within New York City Subway
Location within New York City
Location within New York
Track layout
Street map
Station service legend
Symbol	Description
Stops all times	Stops all times
Stops weekdays during the day	Stops weekdays during the day
Stops weekdays and weekday late nights	Stops weekdays and weekday late nights
Stops all times except late nights	Stops all times except late nights

The Winthrop Street station is a station on the IRT Nostrand Avenue Line of the New York City Subway, located in Brooklyn at the intersection of Winthrop Street and Nostrand Avenue. The station is served by the 2 train at all times and the 5 train on weekdays.

== History ==
The Dual Contracts, which were signed on March 19, 1913, were contracts for the construction and/or rehabilitation and operation of rapid transit lines in the City of New York. The Dual Contracts promised the construction of several lines in Brooklyn. As part of Contract 4, the IRT agreed to build a subway line along Nostrand Avenue in Brooklyn. The construction of the subway along Nostrand Avenue spurred real estate development in the surrounding areas. The Nostrand Avenue Line opened on August 23, 1920, and the Winthrop Street station opened along with it.

From 1962 to 1964, the platforms at Winthrop Street were extended at either end to 510 feet (160 m) so that they could accommodate 10-car trains. Platforms at other stations along the Nostrand Avenue Line were extended at this time.

The Flatbush Avenue-bound platform closed from March 18, 2019, and reopened to the public on July 1, 2019. This was so a staircase to the platform could be replaced. Upon the Flatbush Avenue-bound platform's reopening, the Manhattan-bound platform closed until July 29, 2019.

== Station layout ==
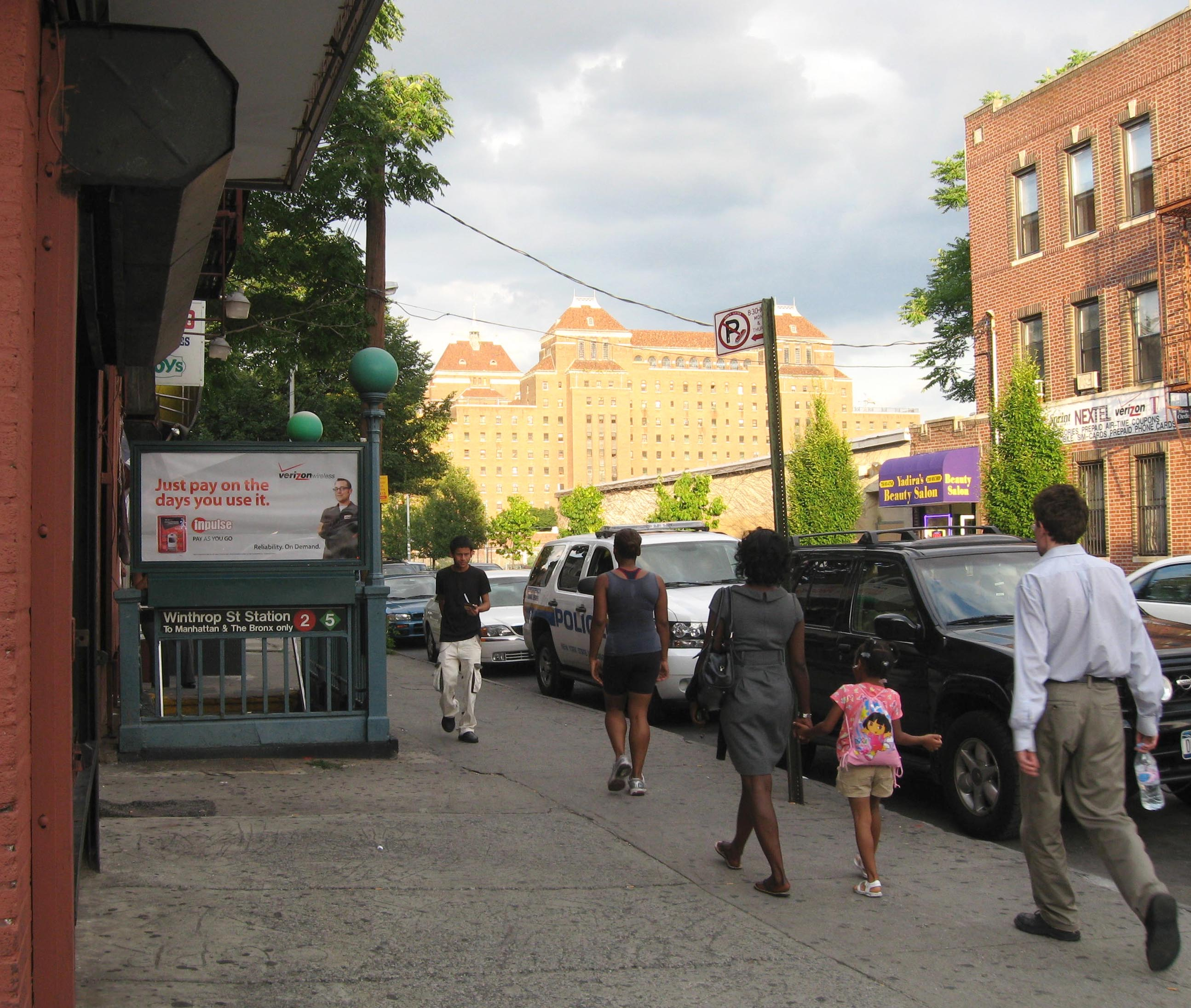
Northbound street stair

This underground station has two tracks and two side platforms which are slightly offset. The station is served by the 2 train at all times and by the 5 train on weekdays during the day. It is between Church Avenue to the south and Sterling Street to the north. Both platforms have their original 1920s Dual Contracts era tiling. The name tablets read "WINTHROP ST." in gold lettering on a blue background with a green and brown border. The trim line consists of a light brown center surrounded by green lines and a darker brown border. "W" tablets on a blue background and brown border run along the trim line at regular intervals.

Fixed platform barriers, which are intended to prevent commuters falling to the tracks, are positioned near the platform edges. At either ends of each platform, where they were extended in the 1960s to accommodate the current standard "A" Division train length of 510 feet (160 m), there are white tiles with name tablets reading "WINTHROP ST" in white sans serif face spelled on a blue background at regular intervals. All columns in the station are I-beams and are painted green.

=== Exits ===
Each platform has one fare control area one block apart from each other and there are no crossovers or crossunders to allow free transfers between directions. The one on the Manhattan-bound side, located on platform level, has a turnstile bank, token booth, and one staircase going up to the northeast corner of Winthrop Street and Nostrand Avenue.

The fare control area on the Flatbush Avenue-bound platform is unstaffed. Two ten-step staircases go up to a mezzanine where two exit-only turnstiles and one High Entry/Exit Turnstiles provides access to/from the station. Outside fare control, there is a single staircase going up to the southwest corner of Parkside and Nostrand Avenues, one block south of the staircase to the Manhattan-bound fare control area. Mosaic directional signs on the southbound platform indicate that it used to have an exit to Winthrop Street as well.
