= 2 (New York City Subway service) =

Rapid transit service

- Seventh Avenue Express

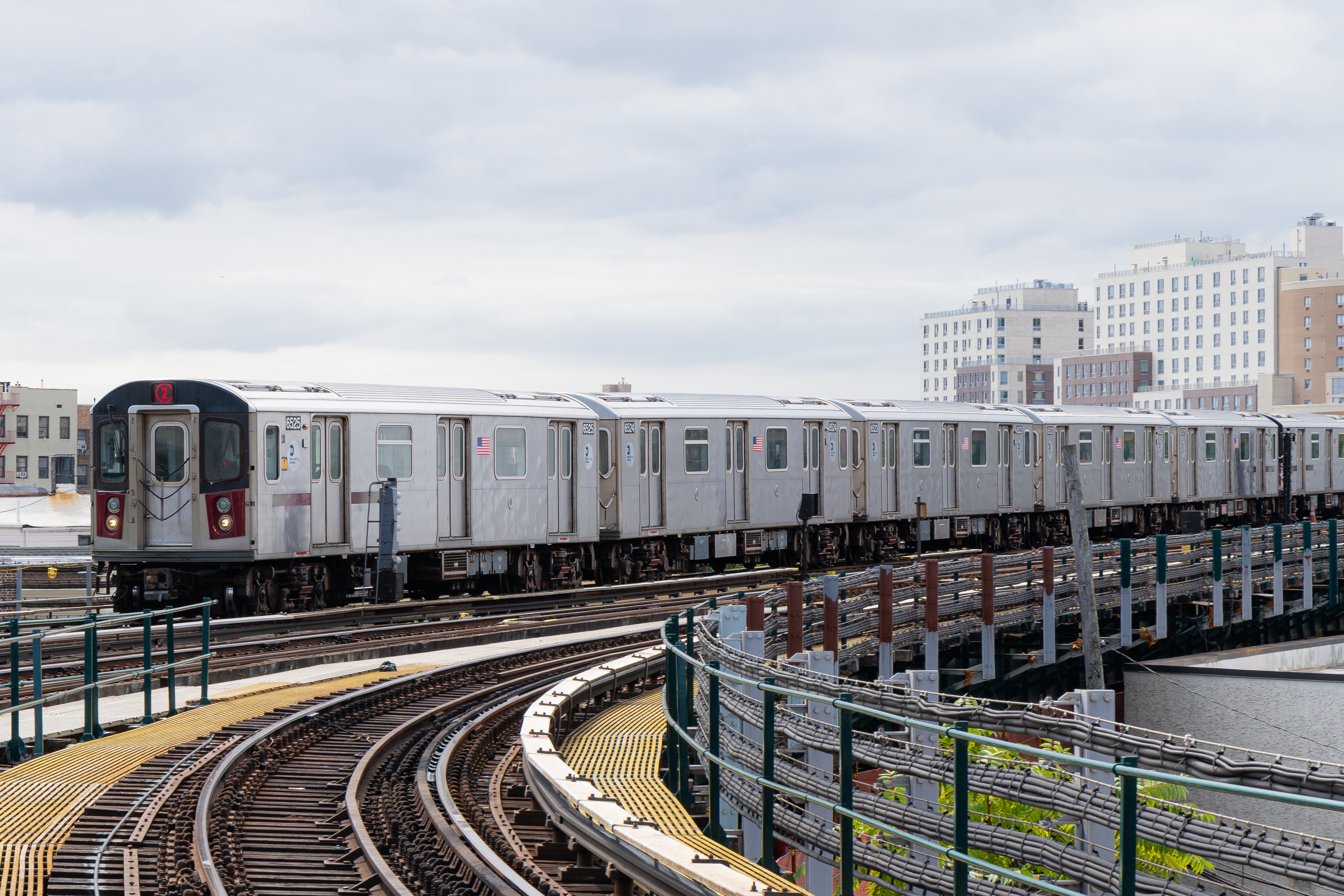
- Wakefield–241st Street-bound 2 train of R142s entering East 180th Street in the Bronx.

- Note: Dashed pink line shows limited rush hour service to/from New Lots Avenue.
- Northern end: Wakefield–241st Street
- Southern end: Flatbush Avenue–Brooklyn College; New Lots Avenue (limited rush hour service)
- Stations: 49; 52 (limited service); 61 (late night service)
- Rolling stock: R142 (Rolling stock assignments subject to change)
- Depot: 239th Street Yard (fleet interchangeable with at East 180th Street Yard)
- Started service: November 26, 1904; 121 years ago

The 2 Seventh Avenue Express is a rapid transit service in the A Division of the New York City Subway. Its route emblem, or "bullet", is colored red since it uses the IRT Broadway–Seventh Avenue Line through most of Manhattan.

The 2 operates 24 hours daily between 241st Street in Wakefield, Bronx, and Flatbush Avenue–Brooklyn College in Flatbush, Brooklyn; limited rush hour service in the reverse-peak direction originates and terminates at New Lots Avenue in East New York, Brooklyn instead of Flatbush Avenue. (Note: Only one 2 train with this service pattern operates in the peak direction, during the AM rush hour.) Daytime service makes express stops in Manhattan (between 96th and Chambers Streets) and all stops elsewhere; overnight service makes all stops along the full route.

Historically, 2 trains have also run to Crown Heights–Utica Avenue or New Lots Avenue. They ran exclusively on the IRT New Lots Line until 1983, when the 2 was routed to Flatbush Avenue. This is still the case with some rush-hour trains, albeit just to New Lots Avenue.

== Service history ==
=== Early history ===
The first section of what became the current 2 entered service on November 26, 1904, from the temporary 180th Street–Bronx Park terminal via the West Farms El to 149th Street–3rd Avenue. On July 10, 1905, the connection between the IRT Lenox Avenue Line and IRT White Plains Road Line (which was previously served by the Third Avenue El) opened, allowing subway service from Manhattan to the Bronx.

On January 9, 1908, the Joralemon Street Tunnel opened, connecting the current IRT Lexington Avenue Line to Brooklyn. At this time, trains ran from East 180th Street to Borough Hall. On May 1, 1908, trains were extended to Nevins Street and Atlantic Avenue.

The IRT White Plains Road Line was extended to 219th Street on March 3, 1917, to 238th Street–Nereid Avenue on March 31, 1917, and to Wakefield–241st Street on December 13, 1920. On August 1, 1918, the entire IRT Broadway–Seventh Avenue Line was completed. On April 15, 1919, the Clark Street Tunnel opened, connecting the line to Brooklyn as well.

Beginning on December 19, 1919, trains ran to South Ferry with some rush hour trains to Atlantic Avenue. In 1923, during rush hours, 2 trains alternated between South Ferry and Utica Avenue. Beginning December 1, 1924, 2 trains that had previously ended at South Ferry were extended to New Lots Avenue.

On January 16, 1928, the New York State Transit Commission announced that it had reached an agreement with the IRT to increase service on its lines by 8,000,000 car miles a year; the greatest increase since 1922. As part of the changes, on January 30, all West Farms trains were extended from Atlantic Avenue to Flatbush Avenue during middays.

As of 1934, 2 trains ran from 180th Street-Bronx Park to Flatbush Avenue weekdays and Saturday during daytime and to South Ferry evenings and Sundays, running express in Manhattan. Late-night service was from 241st St to South Ferry, making all stops. There were occasional lay-up/put-ins from New Lots Avenue, and four weekday evening trains turned at Atlantic Avenue. On September 5, 1937, some evening rush hour trains started running to Flatbush Avenue.

As of July 1, 1938, weekday and Saturday evening service was extended to Flatbush Avenue from South Ferry.

The IRT routes were given numbered designations with the introduction of "R-type" rolling stock, which contained rollsign curtains with numbered designations for each service. The first such fleet, the R12, was put into service in 1948. The Seventh Avenue–Bronx route became known as the 2.

Sunday service was extended to Flatbush Avenue on March 5, 1950.

Beginning on December 26, 1950, alternate weekday rush trains were extended to 241st Street in the peak direction, but PM rush service to 241st Street was discontinued on June 26, 1952. Beginning on August 4, 1952, the 180th Street–Bronx Park station was closed, with trains rerouted to East 180th Street.

=== Under the New York City Transit Authority ===
Morning rush hour service to 241st Street was cut back to Gun Hill Road on October 2, 1953. On March 19, 1954, weekend service was rerouted to New Lots Avenue at all times except late nights. On May 4, 1957, a track connection to the IRT Dyre Avenue Line was completed and daytime 2 trains were rerouted to Dyre Avenue. Evening service remained a shuttle between Dyre Avenue and East 180th Street, and morning rush service from Gun Hill Road was discontinued.

On December 20, 1957, weekday trains were rerouted to New Lots Avenue at all times except late nights. On June 26, 1958, late night service began between Dyre Avenue and East 180th Street. Beginning on December 12, 1958, late night service was extended to Flatbush Avenue and the 2 began running express at all times. Beginning February 6, 1959, trains ran between Wakefield–241st Street and Flatbush Avenue at all times except late nights, when they ran between East 180th Street and New Lots Avenue.

Beginning on April 8, 1960, daytime service was rerouted from Dyre Avenue to 241st Street and service in Brooklyn was rerouted from New Lots Avenue to Flatbush Avenue. At the same time, late night service was rerouted from Flatbush Avenue to New Lots Avenue.

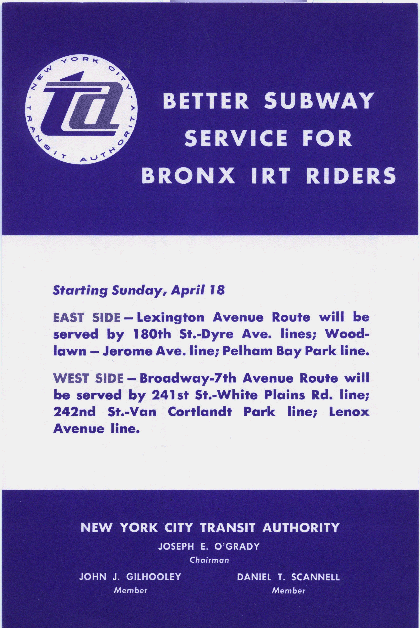
Better Subway Service For Bronx IRT Riders (1965)

Beginning on April 18, 1965, evening service was extended from East 180th Street to 241st Street and daytime service was rerouted from Flatbush Avenue to New Lots Avenue.

On July 10, 1983, the 2 and 3 trains swapped terminals in Brooklyn, with 2 trains terminating at Flatbush Avenue and 3 trains terminating at New Lots Avenue. These changes were made to reduce non-revenue subway car mileage, to provide a dedicated fleet for each service, and to provide an easily accessible inspection yard for each service. The change allowed the 2 to be dedicated to 239th Street Yard and allowed the 3 to be assigned to Livonia Yard. With the rerouting of 3 trains, train lengths along the New Lots Line were reduced from 10 cars to 9 cars, within acceptable crowding levels, and train lengths along the Nostrand Avenue Line were increased from 9 to 10 cars, reducing crowding.

In Spring 1995, rush hour 5 service to 241st Street was cut back to Nereid Avenue. 241st Street had insufficient capacity to terminate all 2 and 5 trains during rush hours, requiring some 2 and 5 trips to terminate at Nereid Avenue. To ease passenger confusion regarding which trips terminate where and to provide more reliable service, it was decided to have all 2 trips terminate at 241st Street and have all 5 trains terminate at Nereid Avenue. This recommendation was made in response to comments made as part of the Northeast Bronx Comprehensive Study.

From March 2 to October 12, 1998, the IRT Lenox Avenue Line was rehabilitated. On weekdays, 2 trains ran via the IRT Lexington Avenue Line between 149th Street–Grand Concourse and Nevins Street uptown from 5:00 a.m. to midnight and downtown from midnight to 5:00 a.m. On October 3, 1999, the 2 began running local in Manhattan during late night hours so local stations would receive service every ten minutes.

On December 9, 1999, New York City Transit released a proposal revising 2 and 5 service in the Bronx to eliminate a merge north of the East 180th Street station, increasing capacity and reducing delays, to the Metropolitan Transportation Authority (MTA) Board. Dyre Avenue-bound 5 trains would start running local along the White Plains Road Line while 2 trains would run express. Nereid Avenue-bound 5 trains would continue to run express in the Bronx. As part of the change, the frequency of service at White Plains Road Line local stations would decrease from 12 trains per hour to 7 trains per hour. Market research showed that riders at these stations preferred Lexington Avenue Line service. In addition, riders on the line north of East 180th Street would gain express service. This change would have been revenue neutral.

Shortly after the proposal was more widely announced in April 2000, Assemblyman Jeffrey Klein collected 2,000 signatures for a petition opposing the change. The MTA delayed the change's planned implementation by a month after receiving the petition. Opponents of the change also argued that it would have increased subway crowding on the 2 train, especially at the 72nd Street station on the IRT Broadway–Seventh Avenue Line. The change was also opposed by State Senator Eric Schneiderman, Assemblyman Scott Stringer, and Public Advocate Mark Green. New York City Transit expected the passenger volume of downtown 2 trains in the morning rush hour to increase from 92% of capacity to 108% at 72nd Street. After Assembly Speaker Sheldon Silver put pressure on the MTA, the change was pushed back for an additional three months in May 2000. On September 24, 2000, a spokesperson for New York City Transit said that MTA Chairman E. Virgil Conway told planners to drop the change until service on the 5 was increased with the arrival of new R142 subway cars by early 2002; the swap proposal was canceled the next day.

=== 2001–present ===
After the September 11, 2001 attacks, 2 service was briefly split into two sections, with the northern section operating between 241st Street and 96th Street and the southern section operating between Atlantic Avenue and Flatbush Avenue. Service between 96th Street and 34th Street was quickly restored on the evening of September 12. On September 17, 2 service was restored along the full route and made all stops in Manhattan, with trains skipping Franklin Street, Chambers Street and Park Place. Franklin Street reopened on September 18, Chambers Street reopened on September 26, and Park Place reopened on October 28. Normal 2 service was restored on September 15, 2002.

Due to repairs to Hurricane Sandy-related damage on the Clark Street Tube, on weekends between June 17, 2017, and June 24, 2018, the 2 ran between Eastchester–Dyre Avenue in the Bronx and South Ferry in Lower Manhattan, with 5 trains replacing it in Brooklyn and the Bronx north of East 180th Street. Trains ran express only between 96th Street and Times Square–42nd Street during the daytime.

== Route ==
=== Signage history ===
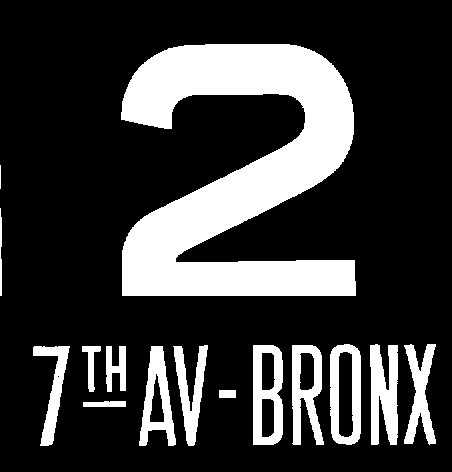
Pre-1967 bullet used on the R12s to R36s

1967–1979 bullet

The current bullet used since 1979

=== Service pattern ===
The following table shows the lines used by the 2, with shaded boxes indicating the route at the specified times:

| Line | From | To | Tracks | Times | | |
| Line | From | To | Tracks | all ex. nights | late nights | rush hours |
|---|---|---|---|---|---|---|
| IRT White Plains Road Line (full line) | Wakefield–241st Street | 149th Street–Hostos | local | | | |
| IRT Lenox Avenue Line | 135th Street | 110th Street–Malcolm X Plaza | all | | | |
| IRT Broadway–Seventh Avenue Line | 96th Street | Chambers Street | express | | | |
| IRT Broadway–Seventh Avenue Line | 96th Street | Chambers Street | local | | | |
| IRT Broadway-Seventh Avenue Line, Brooklyn branch | Park Place | Borough Hall | all | | | |
| IRT Eastern Parkway Line | Hoyt Street | Franklin Avenue–Medgar Evers College | local | | | |
| IRT Nostrand Avenue Line (full line) | President Street–Medgar Evers College | Flatbush Avenue–Brooklyn College | all | | | Most trains |
| IRT Eastern Parkway Line | Nostrand Avenue | Crown Heights–Utica Avenue | local | | | Limited service |
| IRT New Lots Line (full line) | Sutter Avenue–Rutland Road | New Lots Avenue | all | | | Limited service |

=== Stations ===
For a more detailed station listing, see the articles on the lines listed above.

Station service legend
| Stops all times | Stops 24 hours a day |
| Stops all times except late nights | Stops every day during daytime hours only |
| Stops late nights only | Stops every day during overnight hours only |
| Stops weekdays during the day | Stops during weekday daytime hours only |
| Stops weekends during the day | Stops during weekend daytime hours only |
| Stops daily except rush hours in the peak direction | Stops every day during daytime hours, except during weekday rush hours in the peak direction |
| Stops rush hours only | Stops during weekday rush hours only |
| Stops rush hours in the peak direction only | Stops during weekday rush hours in the peak direction only |
| Station closed | Station closed |
| Stops rush hours in the reverse-peak direction only | Stops rush hours in the reverse-peak direction only (limited service) |
Time period details
| Disabled access | Station is compliant with the Americans with Disabilities Act |
| ↑ | Station is compliant with the Americans with Disabilities Act in the indicated direction only |
| ↓ | Station is compliant with the Americans with Disabilities Act in the indicated direction only |
| | Elevator access to mezzanine only |

| Flat. | NL | Stations | Disabled access | Subway transfers | Connections |
|---|---|---|---|---|---|
The Bronx
White Plains Road Line
| Stops all times | Stops rush hours in the reverse-peak direction only | Wakefield–241st Street | | | Metro-North Railroad Harlem Line at Wakefield |
| Stops all times | Stops rush hours in the reverse-peak direction only | Nereid Avenue | | 5 | Originating point for some southbound a.m. rush hour trains |
| Stops all times | Stops rush hours in the reverse-peak direction only | 233rd Street | Disabled access | 5 | Metro-North Railroad Harlem Line at Woodlawn |
| Stops all times | Stops rush hours in the reverse-peak direction only | 225th Street | | 5 | |
| Stops all times | Stops rush hours in the reverse-peak direction only | 219th Street | | 5 | |
| Stops all times | Stops rush hours in the reverse-peak direction only | Gun Hill Road | Disabled access | 5 | Bx41 Select Bus Service; Metro-North Railroad Harlem Line at Williams Bridge |
| Stops all times | Stops rush hours in the reverse-peak direction only | Burke Avenue | | 5 | |
| Stops all times | Stops rush hours in the reverse-peak direction only | Allerton Avenue | | 5 | |
| Stops all times | Stops rush hours in the reverse-peak direction only | Pelham Parkway | Disabled access | 5 | Bx12 Select Bus Service |
| Stops all times | Stops rush hours in the reverse-peak direction only | Bronx Park East | | 5 | |
| Stops all times | Stops rush hours in the reverse-peak direction only | East 180th Street | Disabled access | 5 | |
| Stops all times | Stops rush hours in the reverse-peak direction only | West Farms Square–East Tremont Avenue | | 5 | Q44 Select Bus Service |
| Stops all times | Stops rush hours in the reverse-peak direction only | 174th Street | | 5 | |
| Stops all times | Stops rush hours in the reverse-peak direction only | Freeman Street | | 5 | |
| Stops all times | Stops rush hours in the reverse-peak direction only | Simpson Street | Disabled access | 5 | |
| Stops all times | Stops rush hours in the reverse-peak direction only | Intervale Avenue | | 5 | Bx6 Select Bus Service |
| Stops all times | Stops rush hours in the reverse-peak direction only | Prospect Avenue | | 5 | |
| Stops all times | Stops rush hours in the reverse-peak direction only | Jackson Avenue | | 5 | |
| Stops all times | Stops rush hours in the reverse-peak direction only | Third Avenue–149th Street | Disabled access | 5 | Bx41 Select Bus Service |
| Stops all times | Stops rush hours in the reverse-peak direction only | 149th Street–Hostos | Disabled access | 5; 4 (IRT Jerome Avenue Line) | |
Manhattan
Lenox Avenue Line
| Stops all times | Stops rush hours in the reverse-peak direction only | 135th Street | Disabled access | 3 | |
| Stops all times | Stops rush hours in the reverse-peak direction only | 125th Street | | 3 | M60 Select Bus Service to LaGuardia Airport |
| Stops all times | Stops rush hours in the reverse-peak direction only | 116th Street | | 3 | |
| Stops all times | Stops rush hours in the reverse-peak direction only | 110th Street–Malcolm X Plaza | | 3 | |
Broadway–Seventh Avenue Line
| Stops all times | Stops rush hours in the reverse-peak direction only | 96th Street | Disabled access | 1 3 | |
| Stops late nights only | | | 86th Street | | 1 | M86 Select Bus Service |
| Stops late nights only | | | 79th Street | | 1 | M79 Select Bus Service |
| Stops all times | Stops rush hours in the reverse-peak direction only | 72nd Street | Disabled access | 1 3 | |
| Stops late nights only | | | 66th Street–Lincoln Center | Disabled access | 1 | |
| Stops late nights only | | | 59th Street–Columbus Circle | Disabled access | 1 A D (IND Eighth Avenue Line) | |
| Stops late nights only | | | 50th Street | | 1 | |
| Stops all times | Stops rush hours in the reverse-peak direction only | Times Square–42nd Street | Disabled access | 1 3; 7 <7> (IRT Flushing Line); A C E (IND Eighth Avenue Line at 42nd Street–Port Authority Bus Terminal); N Q R W (BMT Broadway Line); S (42nd Street Shuttle); B D F <F> M (IND Sixth Avenue Line at 42nd Street–Bryant Park, daytime only) | Port Authority Bus Terminal; M34A Select Bus Service |
| Stops all times | Stops rush hours in the reverse-peak direction only | 34th Street–Penn Station | Disabled access | 1 3 | M34 / M34A Select Bus Service; Amtrak, LIRR and NJ Transit at Pennsylvania Station |
| Stops late nights only | | | 28th Street | | 1 | |
| Stops late nights only | | | 23rd Street | | 1 | M23 Select Bus Service |
| Stops late nights only | | | 18th Street | | 1 | |
| Stops all times | Stops rush hours in the reverse-peak direction only | 14th Street | Disabled access | 1 3 Out-of-system transfers with MetroCard/OMNY: F <F> M (IND Sixth Avenue Line at 14th Street); L (BMT Canarsie Line at Sixth Avenue) | PATH at 14th Street; M14A/D Select Bus Service |
| Stops late nights only | | | Christopher Street–Stonewall | | 1 | PATH at Christopher Street |
| Stops late nights only | | | Houston Street | | 1 | |
| Stops late nights only | | | Canal Street | | 1 | |
| Stops late nights only | | | Franklin Street | | 1 | |
| Stops all times | Stops rush hours in the reverse-peak direction only | Chambers Street | Disabled access | 1 3 | |
Brooklyn Branch
| Stops all times | Stops rush hours in the reverse-peak direction only | Park Place | Elevator access to mezzanine only | 3 A C (IND Eighth Avenue Line at Chambers Street); E (IND Eighth Avenue Line at World Trade Center); N R W (BMT Broadway Line at Cortlandt Street) | PATH at World Trade Center |
| Stops all times | Stops rush hours in the reverse-peak direction only | Fulton Street | Disabled access | 3; 4 5 (IRT Lexington Avenue Line); A C (IND Eighth Avenue Line); J Z (BMT Nassau Street Line) | PATH at World Trade Center |
| Stops all times | Stops rush hours in the reverse-peak direction only | Wall Street | | 3 | M15 Select Bus Service; Staten Island Ferry at Whitehall Terminal |
Brooklyn
| Stops all times | Stops rush hours in the reverse-peak direction only | Clark Street | Elevator access to mezzanine only | 3 | NYC Ferry: East River and South Brooklyn routes (at Old Fulton Street and Furman Street) |
| Stops all times | Stops rush hours in the reverse-peak direction only | Borough Hall | Disabled access | 3; 4 5 (IRT Eastern Parkway Line); N R W (BMT Fourth Avenue Line at Court Street) | |
Eastern Parkway Line
| Stops all times | Stops rush hours in the reverse-peak direction only | Hoyt Street | ↓ | 3 | Station is ADA-accessible in the southbound direction only. |
| Stops all times | Stops rush hours in the reverse-peak direction only | Nevins Street | | 3 4 5 | |
| Stops all times | Stops rush hours in the reverse-peak direction only | Atlantic Avenue–Barclays Center | Disabled access | 3 4 5 B Q (BMT Brighton Line); D N R W (BMT Fourth Avenue Line) | LIRR Atlantic Branch at Atlantic Terminal |
| Stops all times | Stops rush hours in the reverse-peak direction only | Bergen Street | | 3 4 | |
| Stops all times | Stops rush hours in the reverse-peak direction only | Grand Army Plaza | | 3 4 | |
| Stops all times | Stops rush hours in the reverse-peak direction only | Eastern Parkway–Brooklyn Museum | Disabled access | 3 4 | |
| Stops all times | Stops rush hours in the reverse-peak direction only | Franklin Avenue–Medgar Evers College | | 3 4 5 S (BMT Franklin Avenue Line at Botanic Garden) | |
Services to Flatbush Avenue and New Lots Avenue split
Nostrand Avenue Line
| Stops all times | —N/a | President Street–Medgar Evers College | | 5 | |
| Stops all times | —N/a | Sterling Street | | 5 | B44 Select Bus Service |
| Stops all times | —N/a | Winthrop Street | | 5 | B44 Select Bus Service |
| Stops all times | —N/a | Church Avenue | Disabled access | 5 | B44 Select Bus Service |
| Stops all times | —N/a | Beverly Road | | 5 | |
| Stops all times | —N/a | Newkirk Avenue–Little Haiti | | 5 | B44 Select Bus Service |
| Stops all times | —N/a | Flatbush Avenue–Brooklyn College | Disabled access | 5 | B44 Select Bus Service |
Eastern Parkway Line (limited rush hour service only)
| —N/a | Stops rush hours in the reverse-peak direction only | Nostrand Avenue | | 3 4 5 | |
| —N/a | Stops rush hours in the reverse-peak direction only | Kingston Avenue | | 3 4 5 | |
| —N/a | Stops rush hours in the reverse-peak direction only | Crown Heights–Utica Avenue | Disabled access | 3 4 5 | B46 Select Bus Service |
New Lots Line (limited rush hour service only)
| —N/a | Stops rush hours in the reverse-peak direction only | Sutter Avenue–Rutland Road | | 3 4 5 | B15 bus to JFK Int'l Airport |
| —N/a | Stops rush hours in the reverse-peak direction only | Saratoga Avenue | | 3 4 5 | |
| —N/a | Stops rush hours in the reverse-peak direction only | Rockaway Avenue | | 3 4 5 | |
| —N/a | Stops rush hours in the reverse-peak direction only | Junius Street | | 3 4 5 Out-of-system transfer with MetroCard: L (BMT Canarsie Line at Livonia Avenue) | |
| —N/a | Stops rush hours in the reverse-peak direction only | Pennsylvania Avenue | | 3 4 5 | |
| —N/a | Stops rush hours in the reverse-peak direction only | Van Siclen Avenue | | 3 4 5 | |
| —N/a | Stops rush hours in the reverse-peak direction only | New Lots Avenue | | 3 4 5 | B15 bus to JFK Int'l Airport |
