= IRT Nostrand Avenue Line =

New York City Subway line

- The 2 and 5 trains serve the entire IRT Nostrand Avenue Line.

Overview
- Owner: City of New York
- Locale: Brooklyn, New York City
- Termini: President Street–Medgar Evers College; Flatbush Avenue–Brooklyn College
- Stations: 7

Service
- Type: Rapid transit
- System: New York City Subway
- Operator: New York City Transit Authority
- Daily ridership: 35,175

History
- Opened: August 23, 1920; 106 years ago

Technical
- Num of tracks: 2
- Character: Underground
- Track gauge: 4 ft 8 1/2 in (1,435 mm)
- Electrification: 600V DC third rail

The IRT Nostrand Avenue Line is a rapid transit line of the A Division of the New York City Subway running under Nostrand Avenue in the New York City borough of Brooklyn. It is served by the 2 train at all times and is also served by the 5 train during the daytime on weekdays.

== History ==
The Dual Contracts, which were signed on March 19, 1913, were contracts for the construction and/or rehabilitation and operation of rapid transit lines in the City of New York. The contracts were "dual" in that they were signed between the City and two separate private companies (the Interborough Rapid Transit Company and the Brooklyn Rapid Transit Company), all working together to make the construction of the Dual Contracts possible. The Dual Contracts promised the construction of several lines in Brooklyn. As part of Contract 3, the IRT agreed to build a subway line along Nostrand Avenue in Brooklyn.

The line was supposed to extend to Coney Island. The construction of the subway along Nostrand Avenue spurred real estate development in the surrounding areas. In September 1917, the line was projected to open at the end of 1918.

The Nostrand Avenue Line opened on August 23, 1920 at 12:40 a.m.

=== Proposed expansion ===
The line was planned to be extended to Marine Park, Brooklyn (at what is now Kings Plaza) under either Utica Avenue, using a brand-new line, or Nostrand Avenue and Flatbush Avenue. There were also alternate plans for the Nostrand Avenue Line to continue down Nostrand Avenue to Sheepshead Bay.

In December 1918, the New York Public Service Commission considered constructing a yard for the line near its terminal, and possibly acquiring trackage rights on the Manhattan Beach Branch of the Long Island Rail Road so service could run to Manhattan Beach and Brighton Beach, if the line were electrified.

In January 1919, the Public Service Commission decided that the Nostrand Avenue Line should be extended to Coney Island using the Manhattan Beach Branch. The extension would have meant that passengers wishing to get to Coney Island would not have to pay the double fare that was required to get there via the Brooklyn Rapid Transit lines. Previously, the construction of a yard south of Flatbush Avenue was considered, and the yard could be built in conjunction with the new extension. The Manhattan Beach Branch would have had to be electrified. The connection was estimated to cost $250,000. Two additional tracks would have been built along the Manhattan Beach right-of-way so that the other tracks could be used for freight. With the additional costs of the tracks the project would have cost $950,000.

The Nostrand Avenue line was planned to be extended in 1929 as part of the IND Second System. The line would have been extended as a subway to Kings Highway, and then as an elevated line to Avenue S at the cost of $7.4 million. South of Avenue S the line would continue to Voorhies Avenue on a four-track structure shared with the proposed Utica Avenue Line for $3.2 million.

In 1939, the IRT Nostrand Avenue Line was planned to be extended to Voorhies Avenue in Sheepshead Bay as a subway to Avenue T and an elevated from there to Voorhies Avenue. In 1946, the New York City Board of Transportation issued a $1 billion plan to extend subway service to the farthest reaches of the outer boroughs, and as part of the plan the line was again projected to extend to Voorhies Avenue.

On September 13, 1951, the Board of Estimate approved a plan put forth by the Board of Transportation that would cost $500 million. As part of the plan the Nostrand Avenue Line was to be extended to Voorhies Avenue in Sheepshead Bay.

In March 1954, the Transit Authority issued a $658 million construction program including the extension of the Nostrand Avenue Line to Avenue U, which would have cost $51.7 million.

The Nostrand Avenue Line was once again slated to be extended further south in 1968 as part of the newly created Metropolitan Transportation Authority's Program for Action. This was to have been several extensions to serve the then-burgeoning areas of Mill Basin and Spring Creek. The Rogers Junction on the IRT Eastern Parkway Line was a serious traffic bottleneck during the rush hours due to the IRT Nostrand Avenue Line tracks' at-grade junctions with the bi-level IRT Eastern Parkway Line. The Rogers Junction would have to be reconstructed with flying junctions to increase capacity for several extensions. The initial plan had the IRT Nostrand Avenue Line would be extended past Flatbush Avenue – Brooklyn College along Flatbush Avenue to a new modern terminal at Avenue U at Kings Plaza. This extension was projected to cost $60 million. Other plans had the line extended along Nostrand Avenue from Avenue H, where the exiting tunnel ends, to Sheepshead Bay at Avenue W or Voorhies Avenue; this second plan had been proposed as part of the line's original construction. The Nostrand Avenue plan, Route 29–C, which was approved by the Board of Estimate on June 3, 1969, would have had three stations added at Kings Highway, Avenue R, and Avenue W, with a storage yard constructed south of Avenue W. The construction of either extension would have reduced delays and improved operational efficiency because Flatbush Avenue would not need to be a terminal any longer.

In the summer of 1972, the IRT Nostrand Avenue Line extension to Avenue W was being designed. By November 1974, the MTA projected that by 1993, the Nostrand Avenue extension would be open. Due to the 1975–76 fiscal crisis that affected the city, most of the remaining projects did not have funding, so they were declined. Expected to be completed by the mid-1970s and early 1980s, lines for the Program for Action had to be reduced or canceled altogether due to the 1970s fiscal crisis.

In 1968, and again in 1989, the MTA gave consideration to extending the Nostrand Avenue Line approximately 1,000 feet (300 m) beyond the Flatbush Avenue station to provide room for turnaround facilities to eliminate the operational restrictions caused by the current layout.

In October 2008, the Regional Plan Association in the report Tomorrow's Transit suggested that the Nostrand Avenue Line be extended two stops to Kings Highway as a way to improve travel times and reliability for subway service on the Brooklyn IRT.

In August 2016, it was reported that the MTA was looking into an extension of the IRT Nostrand Avenue Line along Flatbush Avenue to Marine Park, which would allow trains to serve Kings Plaza.

== Extent and service ==
All services serve the entire line and make all stops.

	Time period	
	weekdays until 8:45 pm	evenings, weekends, and late nights
"2" train	service	
"5" train	service	no service

=== Route description ===
The two tracks split off from the local tracks of the IRT Eastern Parkway Line and diverge away in the vicinity of Rogers Avenue at the Rogers Avenue Junction, turning south onto Nostrand Avenue to/from the Nostrand Avenue Line. Running beneath Nostrand Avenue, the line serves the neighborhoods of southern Crown Heights, Prospect Lefferts Gardens, Flatbush, East Flatbush, and the Brooklyn College area. The line's final station is Flatbush Avenue–Brooklyn College, where there is an unusual terminal setup. It is the only terminal station in the subway system at the end of a physical line that does not have an island platform, and it was built with two side platforms and two tracks to allow for a planned, but not carried out extension of the IRT Nostrand Avenue Line south towards Voorhies Avenue in Sheepshead Bay. The platforms are connected at the south end just past the bumper blocks (forming a "U" shape), mitigating what is otherwise an inefficient terminal design. This terminal setup is inefficient, and combined with the Rogers Avenue Junction's also-inefficient design (see below), this limits capacity on the line. Therefore, some rush hour 2 and 5 trains run via the IRT New Lots Line.

The IRT Nostrand Avenue Line tunnels continue beyond the bumper blocks at Flatbush Avenue and Nostrand Avenue, extending for several hundred feet to Avenue H. Cemented-over gratings were visible on Nostrand Avenue until approximately 2006 due to the construction of a new building. Prior to the building of the exit at the south end of the station, a temporary wooden ramp connected the platforms, with unused tunnels remaining visible to passengers.

Another factor limiting capacity on the line is the set up of the Rogers Avenue Junction, where trains can diverge from the IRT Eastern Parkway Line to the IRT Nostrand Avenue Line or continue on Eastern Parkway. Rogers Avenue Junction was built when the Nostrand Avenue Line was built, and it only connected the IRT Eastern Parkway Line local tracks to the Nostrand Avenue Line. From west to east between the Franklin Avenue station and the junction, the northbound local track descends to a lower level directly below the southbound local track. Then, the northbound express track, which is still on the upper level at this point, descends to the lower level directly below the southbound express track, creating a dual level two-over-two track layout.

At the junction, a switch on the upper level allows 5 trains on the southbound express track to change to the local track, and a corresponding switch on the lower level allows 5 trains on the northbound local track to change to the express track. Directly to the east, all of the mainline tracks shift slightly to the north, and the Nostrand Avenue Line splits from the local tracks and head south. There is a closed tower at the south end of the southbound platform at the Franklin Avenue station.

This junction is a severe traffic bottleneck, primarily during rush hours when trains run more frequently, and rebuilding it would require massive construction including the tearing up of Eastern Parkway. In 1968, as part of the Program for Action, a rebuilding of the junction was planned in order to alleviate congestion. However, financial troubles caused the plan to be dropped.

== Station listing ==
Station service legend
Stops all times	Stops 24 hours a day
Stops weekdays during the day	Stops during weekday daytime hours only
Time period details
Disabled access	Station is compliant with the Americans with Disabilities Act
↑	Station is compliant with the Americans with Disabilities Act in the indicated direction only
↓	Station is compliant with the Americans with Disabilities Act in the indicated direction only
	Elevator access to mezzanine only

Neighborhood (approximate)	Disabled access	Station	Services	Opened	Transfers and notes
Crown Heights	Begins as split from IRT Eastern Parkway Line local tracks (2 5 )				
Crown Heights		President Street–Medgar Evers College	2 5	August 23, 1920	
Prospect Lefferts Gardens		Sterling Street	2 5	August 23, 1920	B44 Select Bus Service
Prospect Lefferts Gardens		Winthrop Street	2 5	August 23, 1920	B44 Select Bus Service
East Flatbush	Disabled access	Church Avenue	2 5	August 23, 1920	B44 Select Bus Service
East Flatbush		Beverly Road	2 5	August 23, 1920	
East Flatbush		Newkirk Avenue–Little Haiti	2 5	August 23, 1920	B44 Select Bus Service
East Flatbush	Disabled access	Flatbush Avenue–Brooklyn College	2 5	August 23, 1920	B44 Select Bus Service
Provision for future expansion
