= B44 (New York City bus) =

Bus route in Brooklyn, New York

b44 b44
- Nostrand Avenue Line
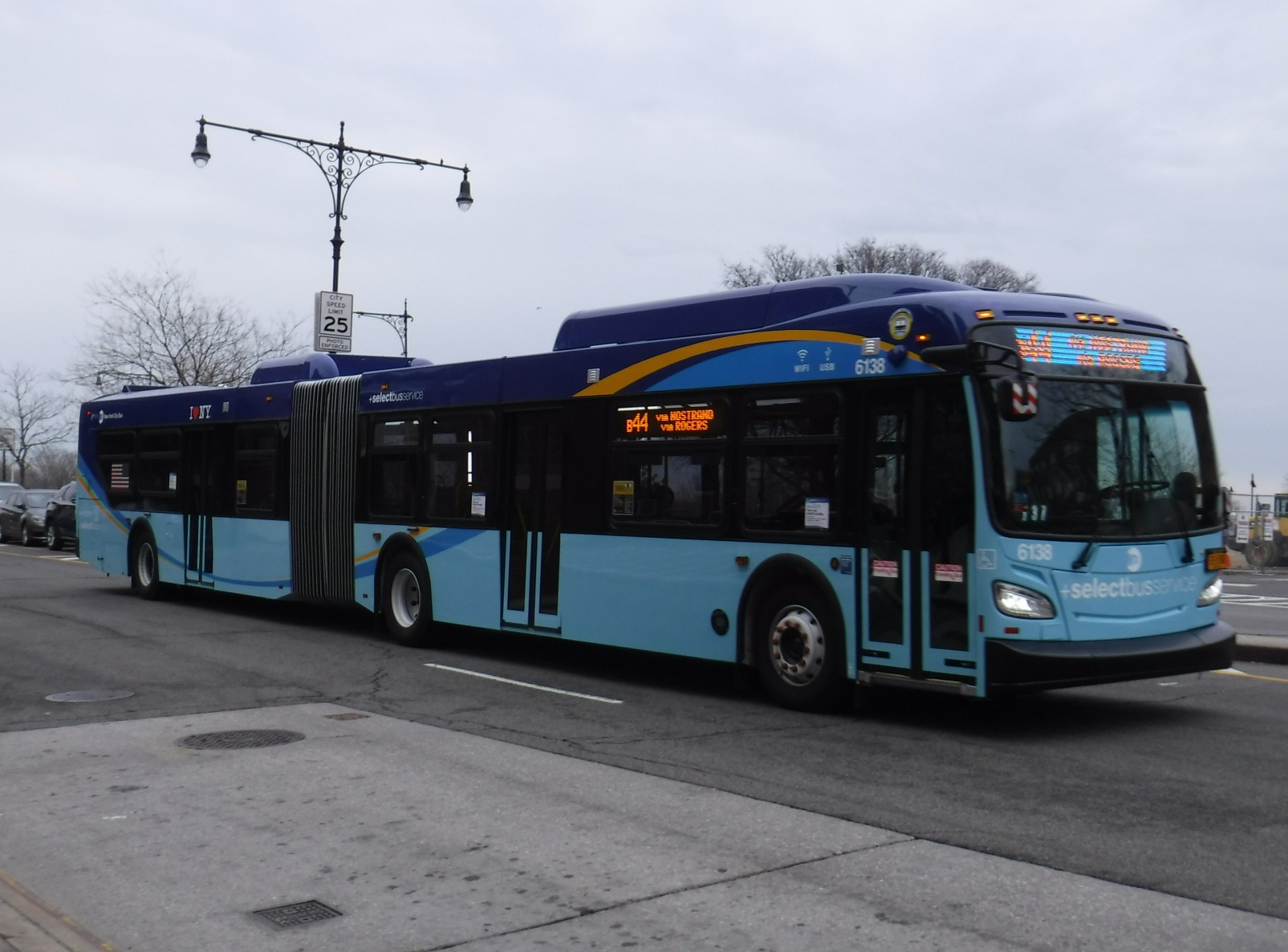
- A 2019 XD60 (6138) on the Williamsburg-bound B44 SBS

Overview
- System: MTA Regional Bus Operations
- Operator: New York City Transit Authority
- Garage: Flatbush Depot
- Vehicle: B44 (and supplemental service for B44 SBS): Orion VII NG HEV; Orion VII EPA10; New Flyer Xcelsior XD40; B44 SBS only: New Flyer Xcelsior XD60; Nova Bus LFS articulated
- Livery: B44 SBS: Select Bus Service
- Began service: 1870 (trolley line); 1951 (bus service); 1995 (Limited-Stop service); 2013 (B44 SBS)

Route
- Locale: Brooklyn, New York, U.S.
- Start: Williamsburg Bridge Plaza Bus Terminal (full route); Williamsburg – Flushing Avenue (daytime local terminus; short runs)
- Via: Nostrand Avenue, Bedford Avenue / Rogers Avenue or New York Avenue (southbound only)
- End: Sheepshead Bay: Avenue U and Nostrand Avenue (short runs); Emmons Avenue and Nostrand Avenue (late night terminus) (Note: Overnight, no service operates to Knapp Street); Knapp Street and Emmons Avenue (full route)
- Length: 9.3 miles (15.0 km)
- Other routes: Nostrand Avenue Subway

Service
- Operates: 24 hours (B44 Local) (Note: B44 SBS does not operate overnight)
- Annual patronage: 5,098,164 (2025)
- Transfers: Yes
- Timetable: B44 B44 SBS

The B44 is a public transit line in Brooklyn, New York City, running mostly along Nostrand Avenue, as well as northbound on Rogers Avenue or New York Avenue and Bedford Avenue (as part of a one-way pair), between Sheepshead Bay and Williamsburg. Originally a streetcar line, it is now the B44 bus route, operated by the New York City Transit Authority.

== Route description and service ==
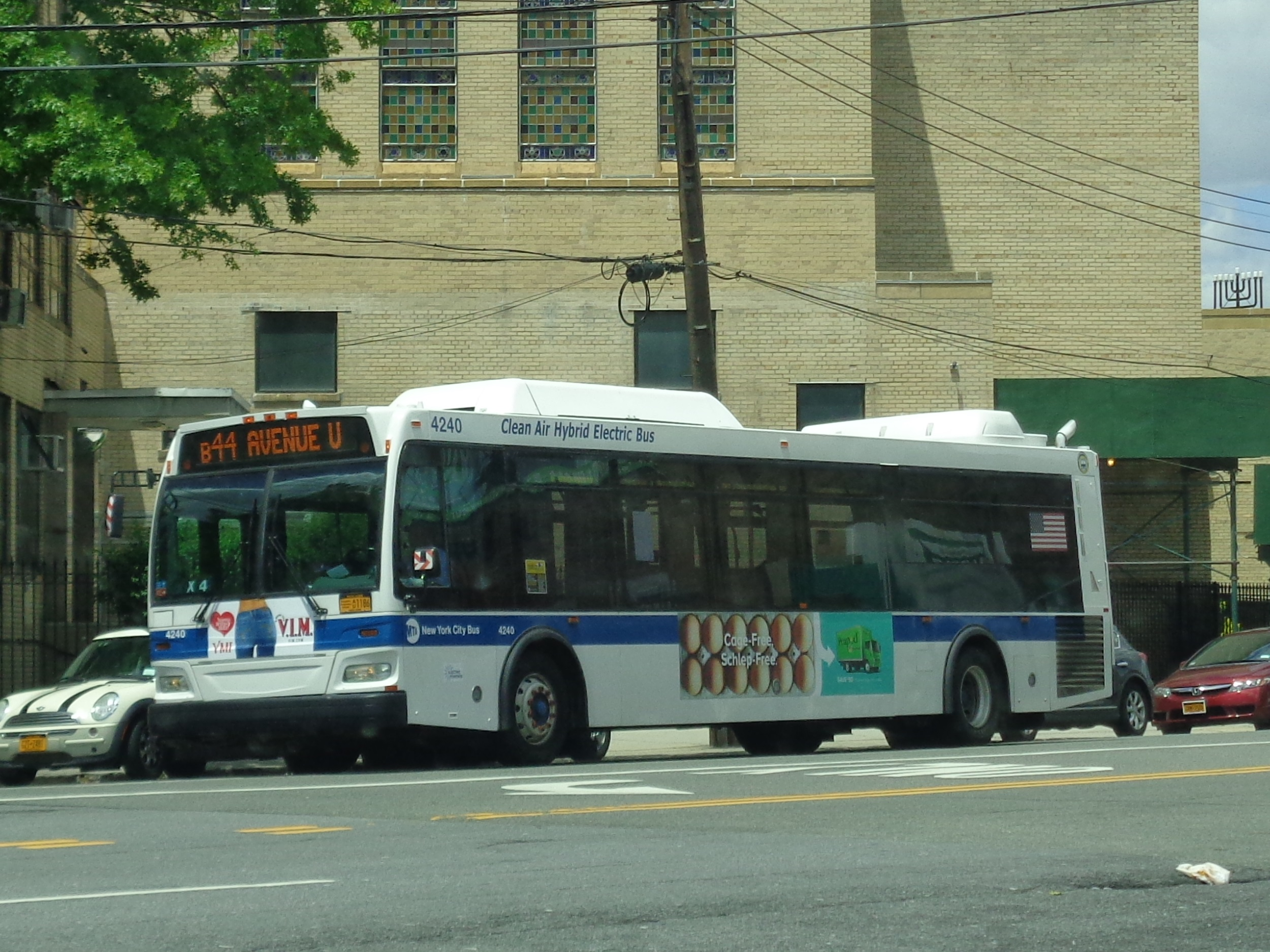
A 2009 Orion VII NG HEV (4240) on the Avenue U-bound B44 local at Nostrand Avenue/Kings Highway

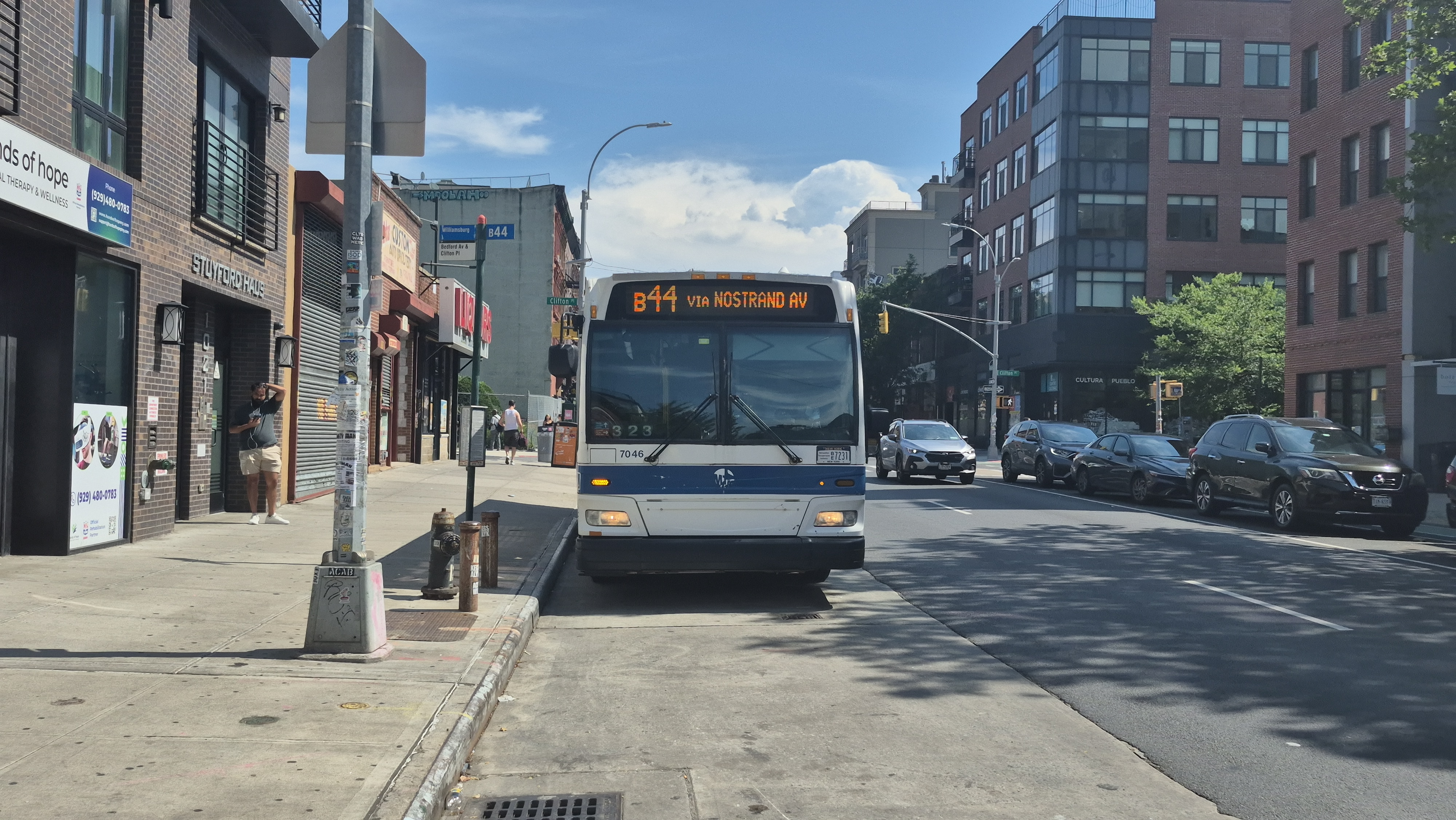
2011 Orion 7 EPA10 #7046 on the B44 local at Bedford Avenue and Lafayette Street

The B44 starts at the Williamsburg Plaza Bus Terminal in Williamsburg. It then turns onto Roebling Street and turns south onto Bedford Avenue (northbound) or Lee Avenue (southbound), making only two stops to Flushing Avenue. At Flushing Avenue, Lee Avenue becomes Nostrand Avenue and the route continues down Nostrand and Bedford Avenues to Fulton Street.

At Fulton Street, southbound buses remain on Nostrand Avenue. In contrast, northbound buses take two routes: the local route shifts to New York Avenue, while Select Bus Service buses remain on Bedford Avenue, which becomes Rogers Avenue at Dean Street (this route is parallel to the B49). Once it leaves Fulton Street, the B44 Local, SBS, and B49 travel down their streets through the neighborhoods of Crown Heights and Flatbush, parallel to the IRT Nostrand Avenue Line south of Eastern Parkway, until Foster Avenue, where the B49 heads west along Foster Avenue to head to Ocean Avenue. At Farragut Road, the northbound B44 Local shifts back to Nostrand Avenue, as two-way traffic resumes.

At Flatbush Avenue, the northbound B44 SBS runs along Flatbush Avenue to Nostrand Avenue to meet up with the B44 Local at the Flatbush Avenue–Brooklyn College subway station. Then the line continues down Nostrand in Midwood to Avenue U, where it meets up with the B36. At this point, now in Sheepshead Bay, the B36 and B44 continue down Nostrand Avenue to Avenue Z, where the B36 heads west along Avenue Z to Coney Island. The B44, meanwhile continues down Nostrand Avenue and turns east along Shore Pkwy (southbound) or Emmons Avenue (northbound), where it meets the B4 bus route and continues to Knapp Street. Buses layover on Shore Parkway and re-enter service on Knapp Street.

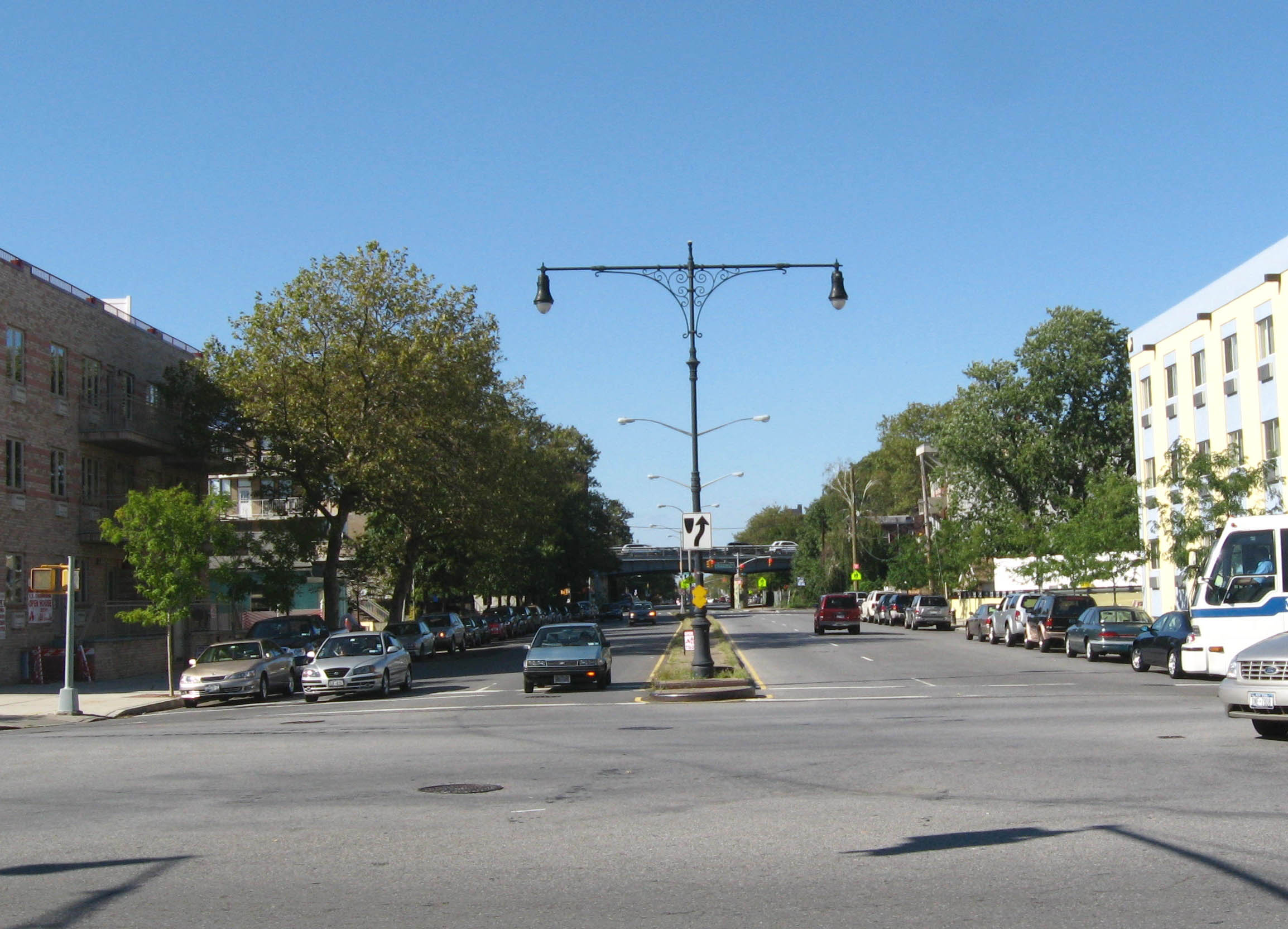
South end in Sheepshead Bay, with an RTS on the B44 about to turn right and start northbound trip

During daytime hours, the B44 Local operates between Flushing Avenue and Sheepshead Bay, with some buses short-turning at Avenue U. SBS buses operate between Knapp Street and Williamsburg and provide all daytime B44 service north of Flushing Avenue. Additional SBS buses operate between Avenue U and Flushing Avenue. During late nights, when the SBS isn't running, the B44 Local operates the full route, but terminates at Emmons Avenue and Nostrand Avenue.

A 2012 Nova Bus LFS Articulated (5327) on the Sheepshead Bay-bound B44 SBS, on an offset bus lane at Nostrand/Church Avenues, and at a bus stop

Prior to SBS implementation in 2013, there was local service to Williamsburg Bridge Plaza and the local terminated at Avenue U. South of that point, the Limited made all stops in Sheepshead Bay and Williamsburg. While there is a B36 service providing local service south of Avenue U after the conversion, the B44 in Williamsburg now operates like a limited stop equivalent, but with no daytime local service in that section. For the first few months, the SBS ran two overlapping services: from Flushing Avenue to Knapp Street, and from Williamsburg to Avenue U. This was changed in May 2014, with the Flushing Avenue trips terminating at Avenue U and Williamsburg buses going to Knapp Street, providing a direct ride along the full route without changing buses.

The B44 bus route acts as a subway feeder connecting passengers from several subway routes that intersect the B44, as well as connecting neighborhood destinations such as Brooklyn College, NYC Health + Hospitals/Kings County, and the Nostrand Avenue Retail corridor.

The B44 is the fourth highest ridership bus in Brooklyn, and the seventh highest in all of New York City. The bus, for a portion of its route, parallels the IRT Nostrand Avenue Line (2 and 5 trains), and the majority of the B44 route allows for 300,000 people who live within 0.25 miles (0.40 km) of the service to have north–south connectivity. The B44 Select Bus Service is the first bus route in Brooklyn to use articulated buses.

=== Select Bus Service stops ===
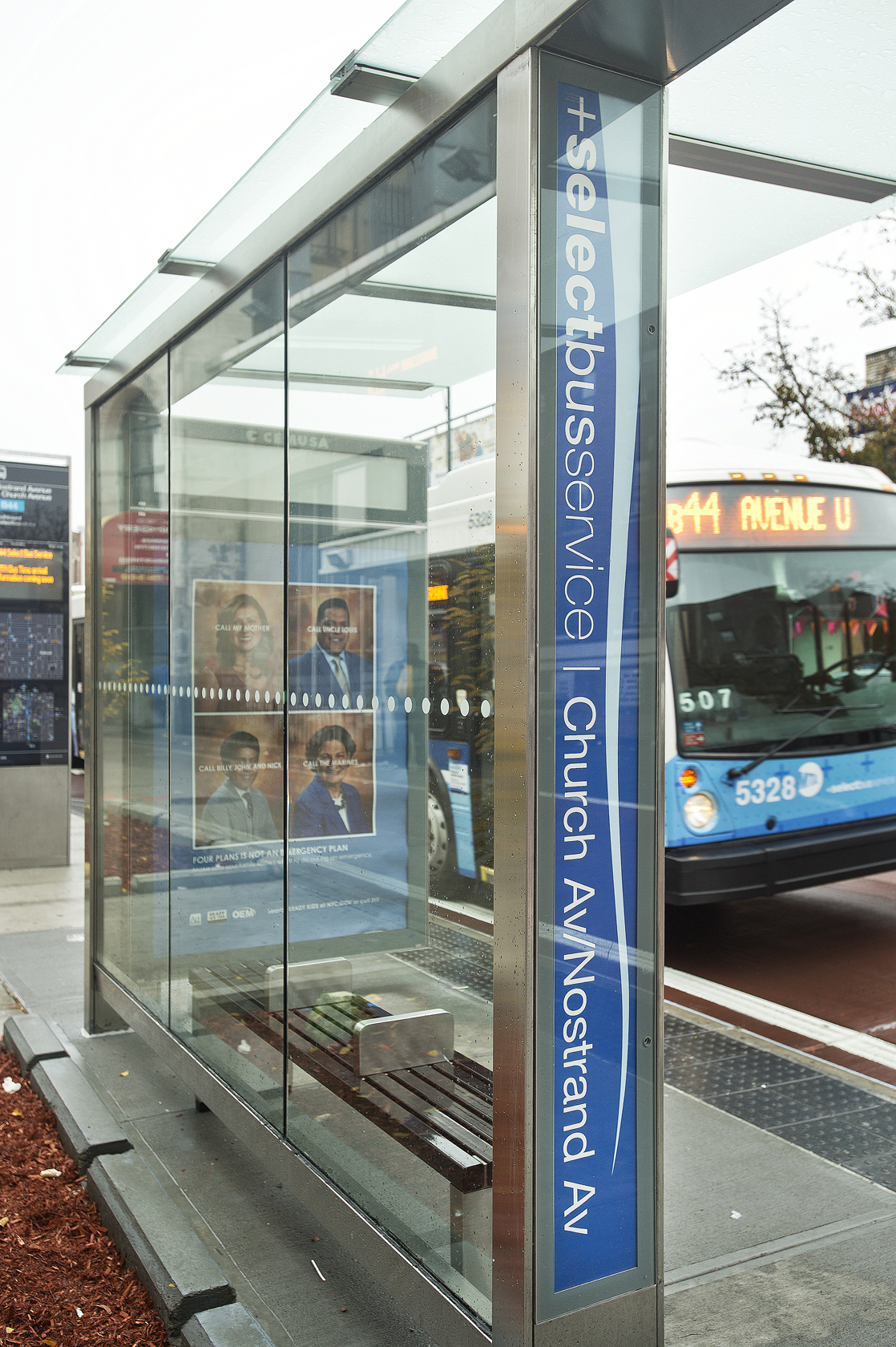
A 2012 Nova Bus LFS Articulated (5328) on the Avenue U-bound B44 SBS at the Nostrand/Church Avenues shelter stop

Station Street traveled	Direction	Connections
Knapp Street Emmons Avenue	Southbound terminus, northbound station	NYC Bus: B4, B44 Local
Emmons Avenue Nostrand Avenue	Northbound	NYC Bus: B4, B44 Local
Shore Parkway Nostrand Avenue	Southbound	NYC Bus: B4, B44 Local
Avenue X	Bidirectional	NYC Bus: B36, B44 Local
Avenue U	Bidirectional	NYC Bus: B3, B36, B44 Local
Avenue R	Bidirectional	NYC Bus: B2, B31, B44 Local
Kings Highway	Bidirectional	NYC Bus: B7, B44 Local, B82 Local, B82 SBS
Avenue L	Bidirectional	NYC Bus: B9, B44 Local
Avenue H (Flatbush Avenue)	Bidirectional	MTA Bus: B103, Q35; NYC Bus: B6, B11, B41, B44 Local; NYC Subway: trains at Flatbush Avenue–Brooklyn College
Northbound traffic uses Rogers Avenue, southbound traffic uses Nostrand Avenue
Avenue D / Newkirk Avenue (Note: Newkirk Avenue and Avenue D stops added to the plan in 2010.)	Bidirectional	NYC Bus: B8, B44 Local; NYC Subway: trains at Newkirk Avenue–Little Haiti (on Nostrand Avenue only)
Church Avenue	Bidirectional	NYC Bus: B35, B44 Local; NYC Subway: trains at Church Avenue (on Nostrand Avenue only)
Clarkson Avenue	Bidirectional	NYC Bus: B12, B44 Local; NYC Subway: trains at Winthrop Street (on Nostrand Avenue only)
Empire Boulevard	Bidirectional	NYC Bus: B43, B44 Local; NYC Subway: trains at Sterling Street (on Nostrand Avenue only)
St. John's Place	Bidirectional	NYC Bus: B44 Local, B45; NYC Subway: trains at Nostrand Avenue (on Nostrand Avenue only)
Northbound buses continue from Rogers Avenue to Bedford Avenue
Fulton Street	Bidirectional	NYC Bus: B25, B44 Local, B49,(from Bedford Avenue only); NYC Subway: trains at Nostrand Avenue (on Nostrand Avenue only); LIRR: Nostrand Avenue (on Nostrand Avenue only)
Gates Avenue	Bidirectional	NYC Bus: B44 Local, B52
Lafayette Avenue /DeKalb Avenue	Bidirectional	NYC Bus: B38, B44 Local; NYC Subway: train at Bedford–Nostrand Avenues
Flushing Avenue	Bidirectional	NYC Bus: B44 Local, B48, B57
Southbound traffic continues from Lee Avenue to Nostrand Avenue
Hewes Street (Note: Hewes Street stop added in September 2011.)	Bidirectional	
Taylor Street	Bidirectional	
Bidirectional traffic resumes on Roebling Street
Williamsburg Bridge Plaza Broadway / Havemeyer Street	Northbound terminus, southbound station	NYC Bus: B24, B32, B39, B46, B60, B62, Q54, Q59; NYC Subway: trains at Marcy Avenue

=== School trippers ===
When school is in session, two buses depart J.H.S. 278 Marine Park at 2:25pm. These trips head to Nostrand Avenue via Fillmore/Gerritsen Avenues and Avenue R. One goes north and terminates at Fulton Street, while the other goes south for Knapp Street.

Two more buses originate outside I.S. 381 at Avenue K/Nostrand Avenue. They both leave at 2:25pm and head north. One terminates at Church Avenue while the other continues until Fulton Street.

All northbound trippers make local stops via New York Avenue. When schools are closed, a different weekday schedule is used for both the local and SBS routes.

== History ==
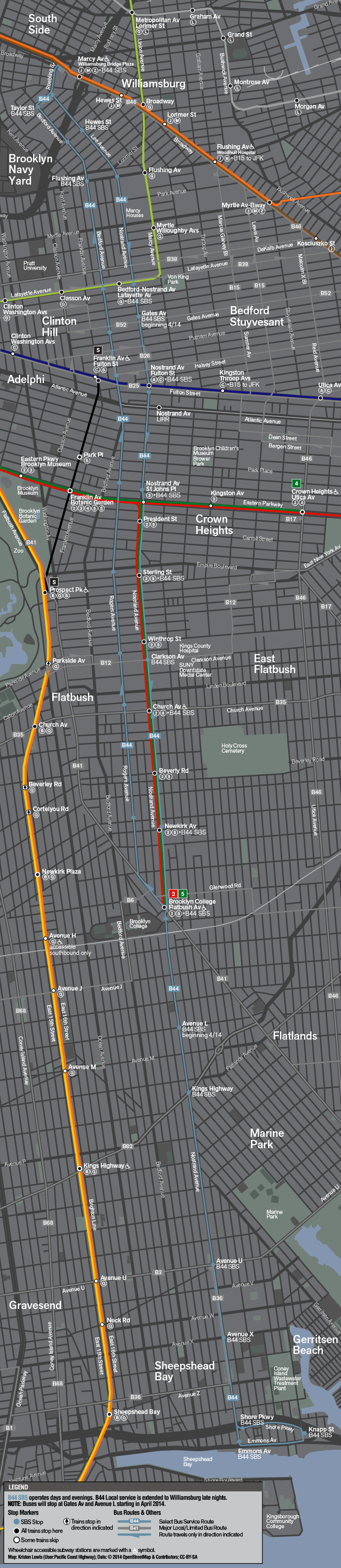
A map showing the B44 SBS (in light blue) with rail connections.

=== Streetcar line ===
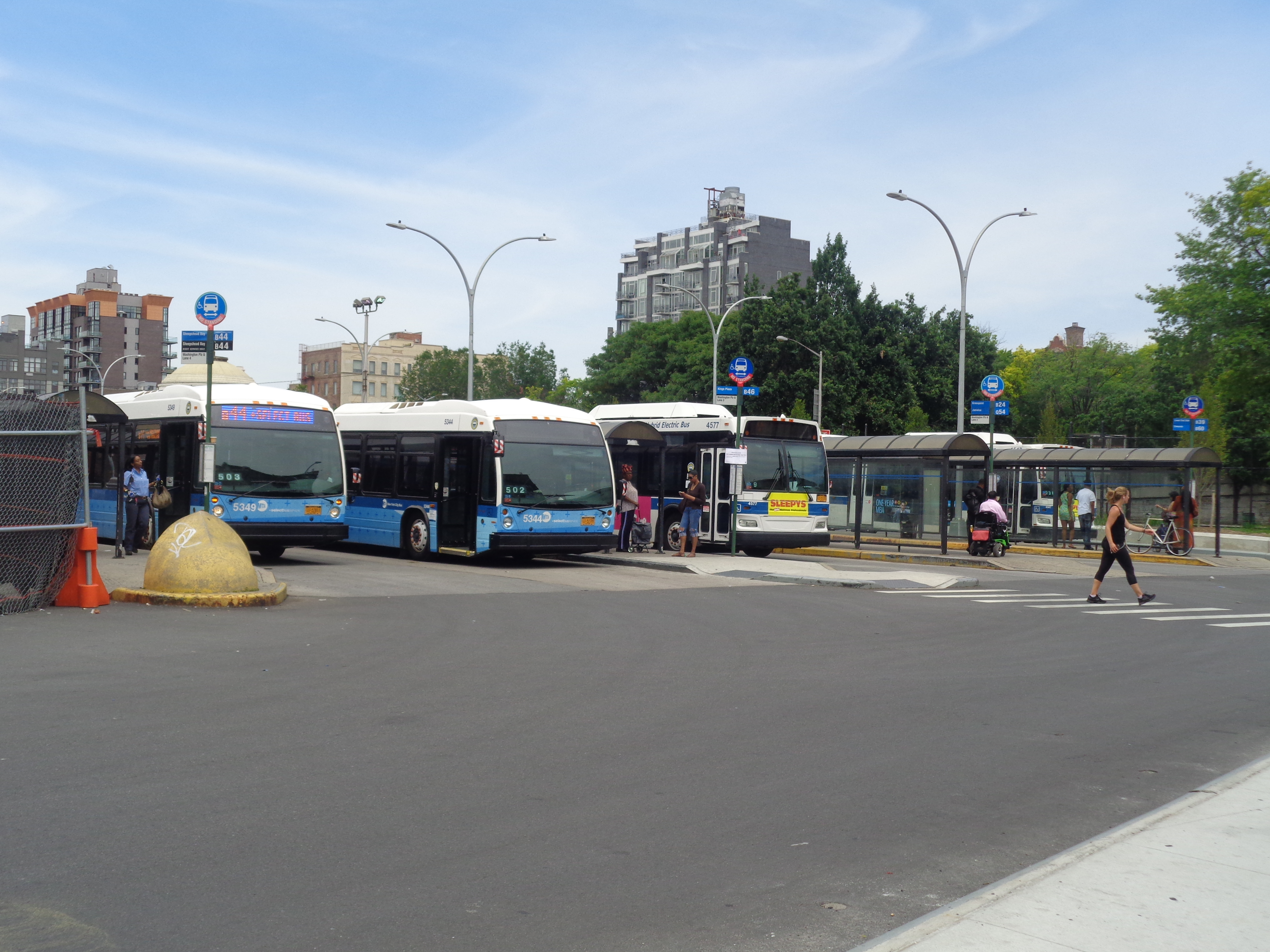
2013 Nova Bus Artics 5344 & 5349 at the northern terminal of the B44, and the former terminal of the streetcar line, the Williamsburg Bridge Plaza Bus Terminal.

The Williamsburgh and Flatbush Railroad was chartered in 1868, and opened in 1870 from the Broadway Ferry in Williamsburg south over the Brooklyn City Rail Road's Greenpoint Line on Kent Avenue and Classon Avenue, east on its Flushing Avenue Line on Flushing Avenue, and south on Nostrand Avenue to Flatbush. The charter allowed them to use Lee Avenue instead from Williamsburg, but residents along that street opposed its use. Tracks were however placed in Lee Avenue in early 1873, and opened soon after, running from the Broadway Ferry east over the Broadway Railroad's Broadway Line on Broadway and south on Driggs Avenue and Lee Avenue.

An extension from Empire Boulevard south to the Flatbush Avenue Line opened on July 15, 1895, after some delay, and the Holy Cross Cemetery Line was moved to a branch of the line along Tilden Avenue. The line eventually reached Avenue U in Sheepshead Bay.

Effective 5 am, December 5, 1948, the line was cut back from Essex Street on the Manhattan side of the Williamsburg Bridge to the Williamsburg Bridge Plaza in Williamsburg, Brooklyn. Service across the bridge was replaced with a transfer to the new B39 bus route.

=== Local and limited bus service ===
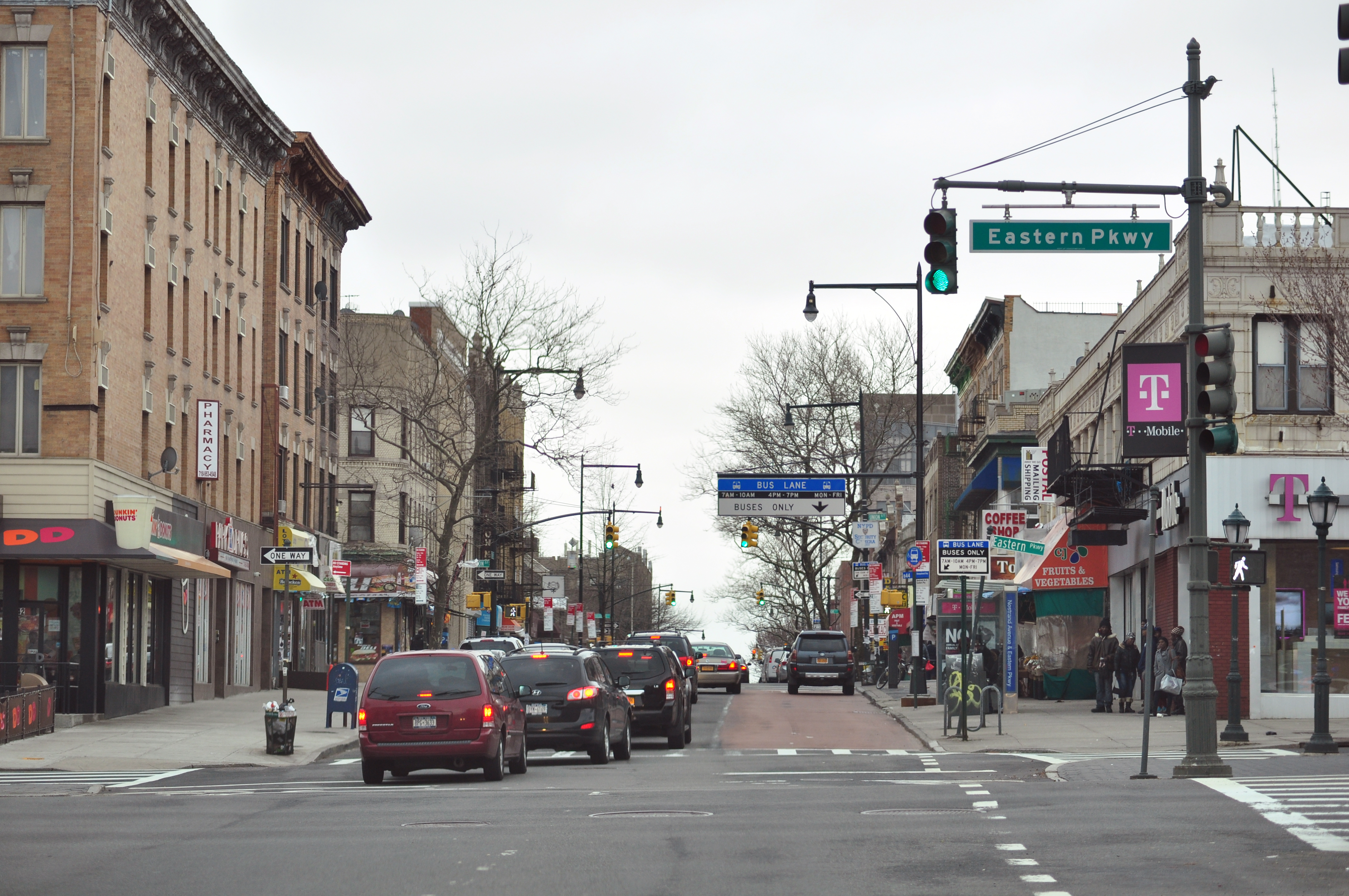
A B44 Sheepshead Bay stop at Nostrand Avenue/Eastern Parkway

Buses were substituted for streetcars on April 1, 1951; the B44 bus now continues south past Avenue U into Sheepshead Bay, some B44 buses now go as far as Emmons Avenue and Knapp Street near the foot of Sheepshead Bay.

Originally, the buses used were New York City Transit Authority Mack diesel buses. Around 1959, the B44 became one of the first bus lines in New York City to use the "new look" GMC buses that became popular in New York City during the 1960s and 1970s. The route ran in both directions on Nostrand Avenue until the mid-1960s, when the section north of Flatbush became a one-way southbound thoroughfare. From that time on, the B44 northbound ran on New York Avenue.

Limited-stop service was added on September 10, 1995.

=== Select Bus Service ===
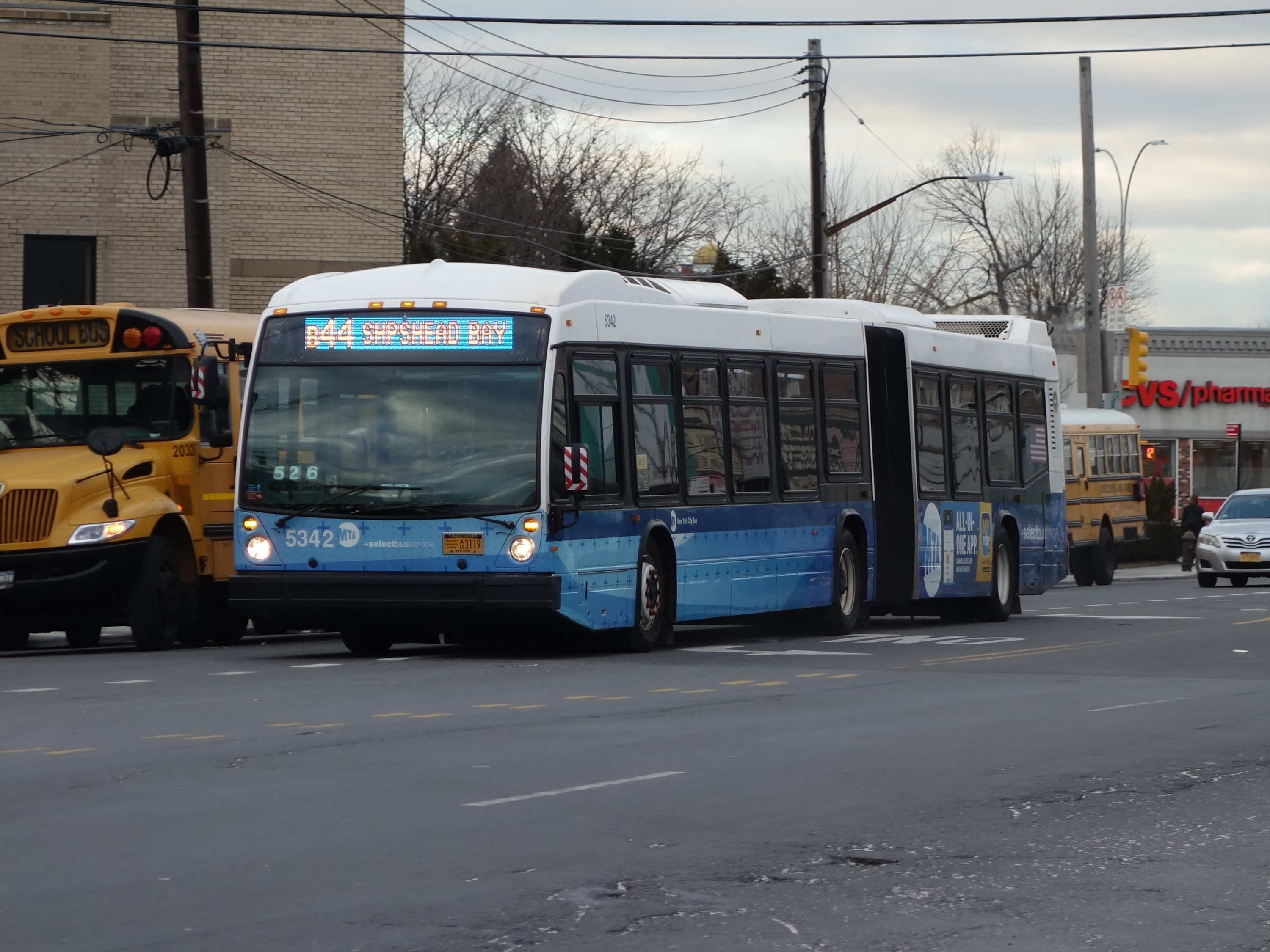
A 2012 Nova Bus LFS Articulated (5342) on the Sheepshead Bay-bound B44 SBS at Nostrand Avenue/Marine Parkway in January 2019

Final design work for the B44 SBS began in fall 2011, and construction south of Atlantic Avenue occurred between spring and fall 2013, including the repaving of the street, the installation of bus lanes, the construction of bus bulbs and neckdowns, and bus lane signs. The construction of the designated bus lanes for the service required the removal of the surface line's rails, which had been previously paved over.

On January 20, 2013, articulated buses started appearing on the B44, which initially ran both the local and limited variants. Effective November 17, 2013, the B44 Limited was converted to Select Bus Service (SBS), joining other SBS routes in New York City: the M15 and M34 in Manhattan and the Bx12 and Bx41 in the Bronx. This is the first SBS route in Brooklyn, and it is the fifth and final Phase I SBS route to be implemented. The service continues to operate between Williamsburg Bridge Plaza (also known as Washington Plaza) and Sheepshead Bay. Southbound SBS service operates on Nostrand Avenue and northbound on Rogers Avenue, north of Flatbush Avenue. Local B44 service continues to operate on Nostrand Avenue and New York Avenue. As of SBS implementation, the B44 SBS is assigned articulated buses while the B44 local is assigned standard buses. Both routes are based out of Flatbush Bus Depot near Marine Park and Kings Plaza, as is the B49 bus route.

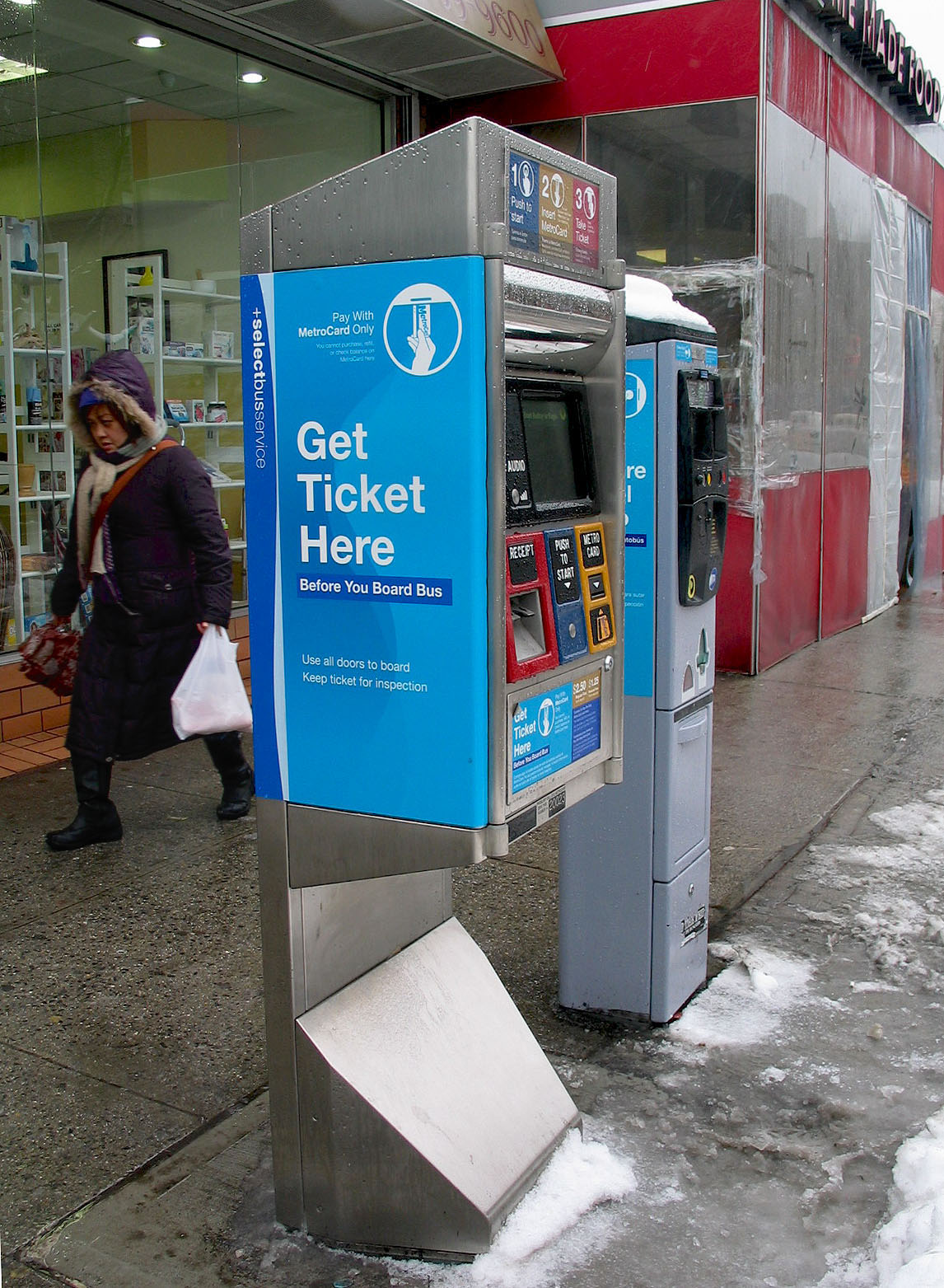
Ticketing machines at a B44 SBS stop

Bus stops were consolidated, with several of the lesser used stops, on the northern and southern portions of the route changed from Limited to local. Off-board fare collection was installed, significantly reducing the amount of time it takes for buses to spend at bus stops. Bus lanes were implemented on 9.6 miles along both directions of the route, covering over half of the route. Northbound buses were rerouted from New York Avenue to Rogers Avenue, a corridor already served by the B49. This allowed for the length of the northbound route to be decreased, and it benefited the northbound route by putting it on a wider street with multiple traffic lanes. B44 local service was kept on New York Avenue to continue serving passengers along that street. As a result of this, riders on both Rogers Avenue and New York Avenue now have direct service to destinations north of Fulton St. 62-foot-long, 3-door buses were put into service on the route, replacing the 40-foot-long, 2-door buses that previously served the B44 Limited. The B44 local continued to use the 40-foot-long buses. Bus bulbs were installed, allowing for more room for people to wait, allowing for the installation of bus shelters and greenery, and allowing for buses to pull straight in and out of stations without pulling over. Resulting from the installation of bus bulbs or neckdowns, which shorten the crossing distances, traffic injuries along the corridor were reduced by 37%.

Two stops were added to the B44 SBS, at Gates Avenue and Avenue L, because of strong public feedback, and B44 local service was increased after the implementation of the B44 SBS. Real time information screens are being added to bus stops along the route.

As a result of the conversion to SBS, travel times decreased between 15-31% compared to the B44 Limited. In addition, ridership along the B44 SBS increased 10% from 2014 to 2015, going against the 1% decline in overall Brooklyn ridership during the same time frame.

After years of requests by Councilman Chaim Deutsch and local residents, a stop was added at Avenue R on September 2, 2018, shortening the 1 mile (1.6 km)-long distance between the Kings Highway and Avenue U stops, while providing transfer to the B2 and B31 buses. New York City Transit and the Department of Transportation had refused to add the stop, claiming that it was unnecessary, and that the local stop could not fit articulated buses. A protest had been held on April 30, 2015, by seniors and local officials to put pressure on the MTA.

=== Bus redesign ===
On December 1, 2022, the MTA released a draft redesign of the Brooklyn bus network. As part of the redesign, southbound B44 buses would maintain their existing routing, although northbound B44 buses would be shifted to Rogers Avenue, with service on New York Avenue replaced by the B49. In both directions, closely spaced stops would be eliminated. The B44 SBS would be rerouted through Sheepshead Bay station at its southern end along Avenue Z to Ocean Parkway, and the stop at Hewes Street would be removed in both directions (The B44 local would still serve these stops overnight).

== Incidents ==
On December 17, 2024 at the start of P.M. rush, a B44 SBS going southbound was at Flushing Avenue when three vehicles all crashed right in front of the bus. The operator couldn’t stop in time and the bus ended up with two of the cars squashed between it and a delivery truck. A total of eight suffered injuries.

== See also ==
=== Connecting bus routes ===
- B24, B32, B39, B46, B60, B62, Q54, Q59 (at Williamsburg Bridge Plaza)
- B48, B57 (at Wallabout Street/Flushing Avenue)
- B54 (at Myrtle Avenue; local only)
- B38 (at DeKalb/Lafayette Avenues)
- B52 (at Gates Avenue/Monroe Street)
- B26 (at Hancock/Halsey Streets)
- B25, B49 (at Fulton Street)
- B65 (at Pacific/Bergen Streets; local only)
- B45 (at St. John’s Place)
- B43 (at Empire Boulevard)
- B12 (at Clarkson Avenue)
- B35 (at Church Avenue)
- B8 (at Avenue D/Newkirk Avenue)
- B6 (one block north), B11, B41, B103, Q35, BM2 (one block east) (at Flatbush Avenue/Avenue H)
- BM1 (at Avenue K; local only; one block west)
- B9, BM4 (at Avenue L)
- B7, B82, B82 SBS (at Kings Highway)
- B100 (at Quentin Road; local only)
- B2, B31 (at Avenue R)
- B3, B36 (at Avenue U)
- BM3 (at Avenue X; two blocks west)
- B4 (at Knapp Street)
