= Flatbush Avenue–Brooklyn College station =

New York City Subway station in Brooklyn

Flatbush Avenue– Brooklyn College
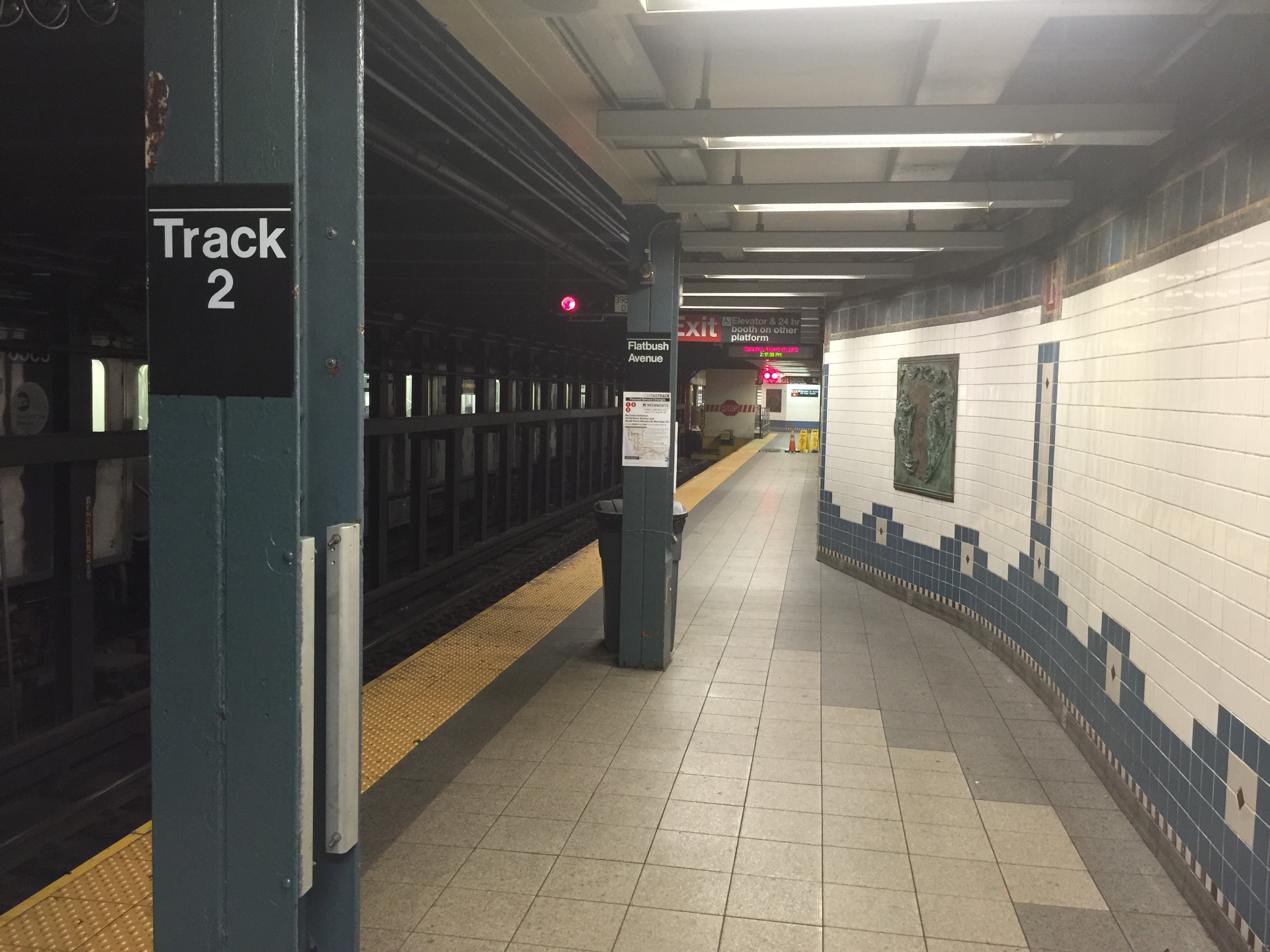
- View from Track 2 platform

Station statistics
- Address: Flatbush Avenue & Nostrand Avenue; Brooklyn, New York
- Borough: Brooklyn
- Locale: Flatbush, East Flatbush
- Coordinates: 40°37′56.5″N 73°56′50.95″W
- Division: A (IRT)
- Line: IRT Nostrand Avenue Line
- Services: 2 (all times); 5 (weekdays only)
- Transit: NYCT Bus: B6, B11, B41, B44, B44 SBS; MTA Bus: B103, Q35, BM2
- Structure: Underground
- Platforms: 2 side platforms
- Tracks: 2

Other information
- Opened: August 23, 1920; 106 years ago
- Accessible: Yes
- Former/other names: Flatbush Avenue; Brooklyn College–Flatbush Avenue

Traffic
- 2025: 3,940,183 ▲7.7%
- Rank: 88 out of 423
Services
Preceding station	New York City Subway	Following station
Newkirk Avenue–Little Haiti 2 5 via Franklin Avenue–Medgar Evers College	2 (New York City Subway service) 5 (New York City Subway service)	Terminus
Location
Location within New York City Subway
Location within New York City
Location within New York
Track layout
Street map
Station service legend
Symbol	Description
Stops all times	Stops all times
Stops weekdays during the day	Stops weekdays during the day
Stops weekdays and weekday late nights	Stops weekdays and weekday late nights
Stops all times except late nights	Stops all times except late nights

The Flatbush Avenue–Brooklyn College station (announced as Brooklyn College–Flatbush Avenue on trains and signed as Flatbush Avenue) is the southern terminal station on the IRT Nostrand Avenue Line of the New York City Subway. It is located at the intersection of Flatbush and Nostrand Avenues in Flatbush, Brooklyn, locally called "The Junction", which also meets the neighborhoods of East Flatbush to the east, Flatlands to the southeast and Midwood to the southwest. The station is served by the 2 train at all times and the 5 train only on weekdays during the day. It is also the closest subway station to Brooklyn College and Midwood High School.

The Flatbush Avenue station was built along with the Nostrand Avenue Line as part of the Dual Contracts. The station opened on August 23, 1920, along with the rest of the line. Various proposals to extend the line past Flatbush Avenue were considered throughout the 20th century, but none were carried out.

The Flatbush Avenue–Brooklyn College station contains two side platforms and two tracks; the platforms are connected to each other at the southern end. It is the only such terminal station in the subway system, creating an inefficient design in which passengers must know which track a train is departing from before going to the platform. The platforms contain exits to the intersection of Nostrand and Flatbush Avenues, with a secondary exit to Avenue H. The station contains an elevator, which makes it compliant with the Americans with Disabilities Act of 1990.

== History ==
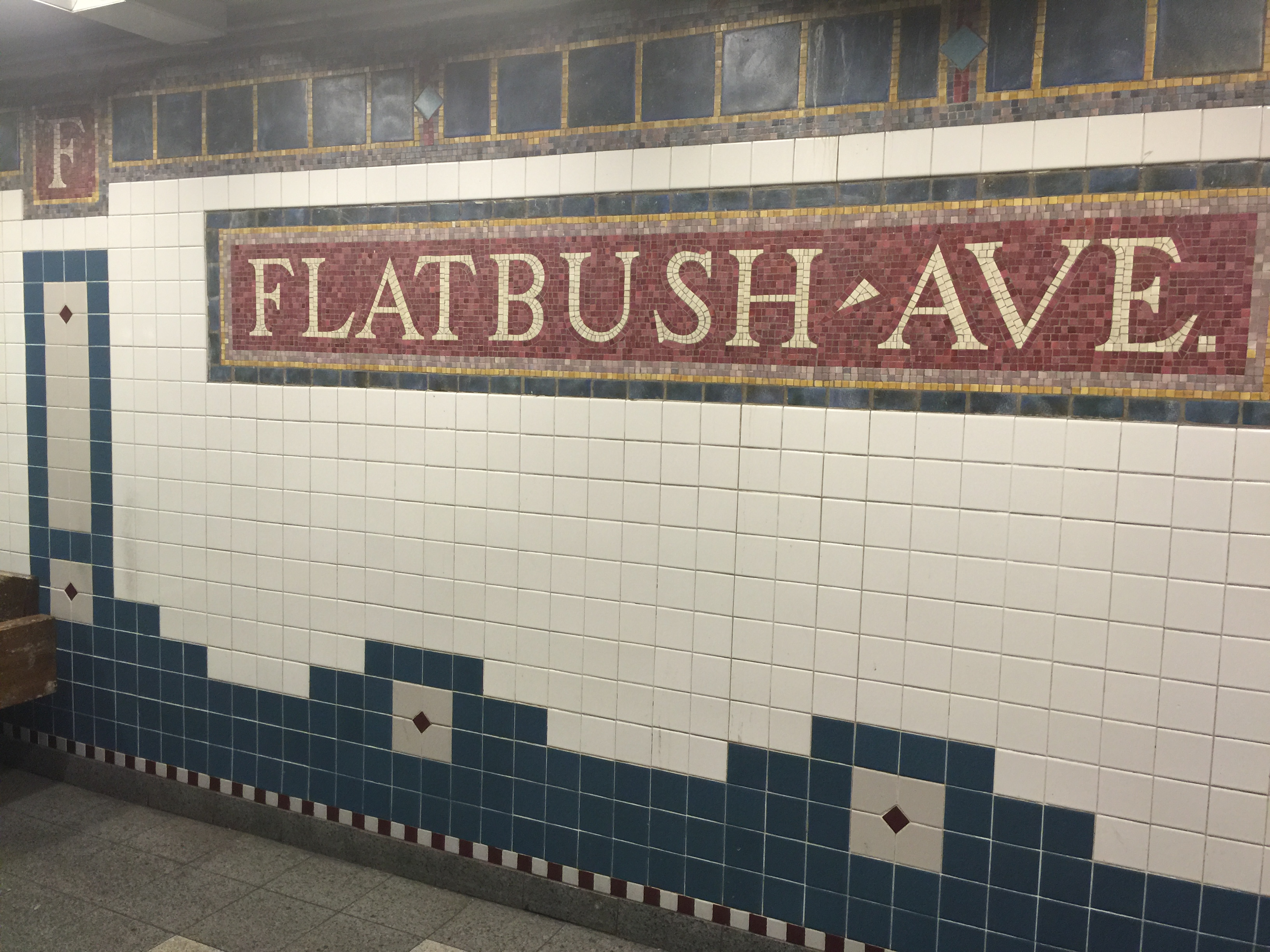
Station tilework

The Dual Contracts, which were signed on March 19, 1913, were contracts for the construction and rehabilitation and operation of rapid transit lines in the City of New York. The Dual Contracts promised the construction of several lines in Brooklyn. As part of Contract 4, the IRT agreed to build a subway line along Nostrand Avenue in Brooklyn. The construction of the subway along Nostrand Avenue spurred real estate development in the surrounding areas. The Nostrand Avenue Line opened on August 23, 1920, and the Flatbush Avenue station opened as its terminal.

This underground station is the only "dead-end" terminal station in the subway system that does not have an island platform. It was built with two side platforms and two tracks to allow for a planned but ultimately unbuilt extension of the IRT Nostrand Avenue Line. The extension, proposed in 1929, would have brought the line south towards Voorhies Avenue in Sheepshead Bay. These plans were revisited in 1939, 1946, 1951, and 1968.

On October 5, 1931, a new staircase at the station to the southeastern corner of Flatbush Avenue and Nostrand Avenue was opened for service.

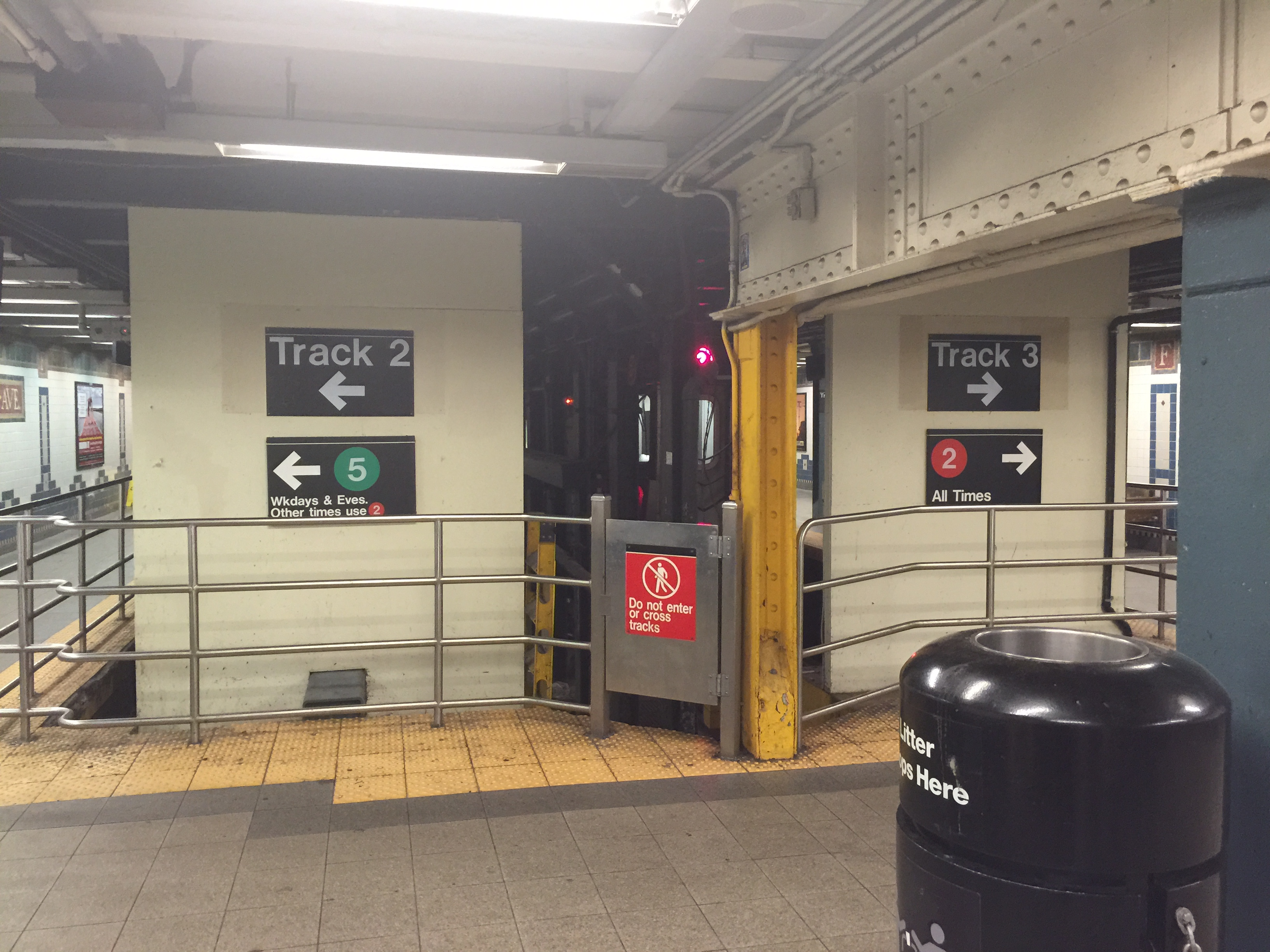
U-shaped connection between the two sides of the station

In 1968, as part of the Program for Action, the Metropolitan Transportation Authority (MTA) gave consideration to extending the IRT Nostrand Avenue Line approximately 1,000 feet (300 m) beyond the station to provide room for turnaround facilities. This would eliminate the operational restrictions caused by the current layout. However, a ballot measure for funding much of the program was voted down in 1971, delaying this plan indefinitely. This plan was again considered in 1989.

In 1981, the MTA listed the station among the 69 most deteriorated stations in the subway system. As part of a plan to increase accessibility in the New York City Subway, the MTA had planned to install elevators at the Flatbush Avenue–Brooklyn College station by 1995. Starting in December 1993, the station was renovated at the cost of $6 million. An elevator was installed, and the 1920s-style "Flatbush Avenue" name tablets, containing red backgrounds with blue borders, were restored on both platforms. The elevator was closed from July to December 2021 for replacement. The top and bottom of the platform walls contain a blue solid line with a colorful border trim. This results in a tiling scheme with blue tiles that create a wavy pattern that comes farther up whenever there is a "F" tile—which stands for Flatbush—in the station's trimline.

In December 2020, the MTA announced that it would commission artwork in honor of subway operator Garrett Goble, who died on March 27, 2020, during an arson at the Central Park North–110th Street station. The Flatbush Avenue–Brooklyn College station was selected because Goble had used it often while growing up. The artwork was ultimately unveiled and installed on May 24, 2021. The MTA announced in 2025 that a customer service center would open at the station.

Plans for the Interborough Express, a light rail line using the Bay Ridge Branch right of way, were announced in 2023. As part of the project, a light rail station at Flatbush and Nostrand Avenues has been proposed next to the existing Brooklyn College subway station.

== Station layout ==
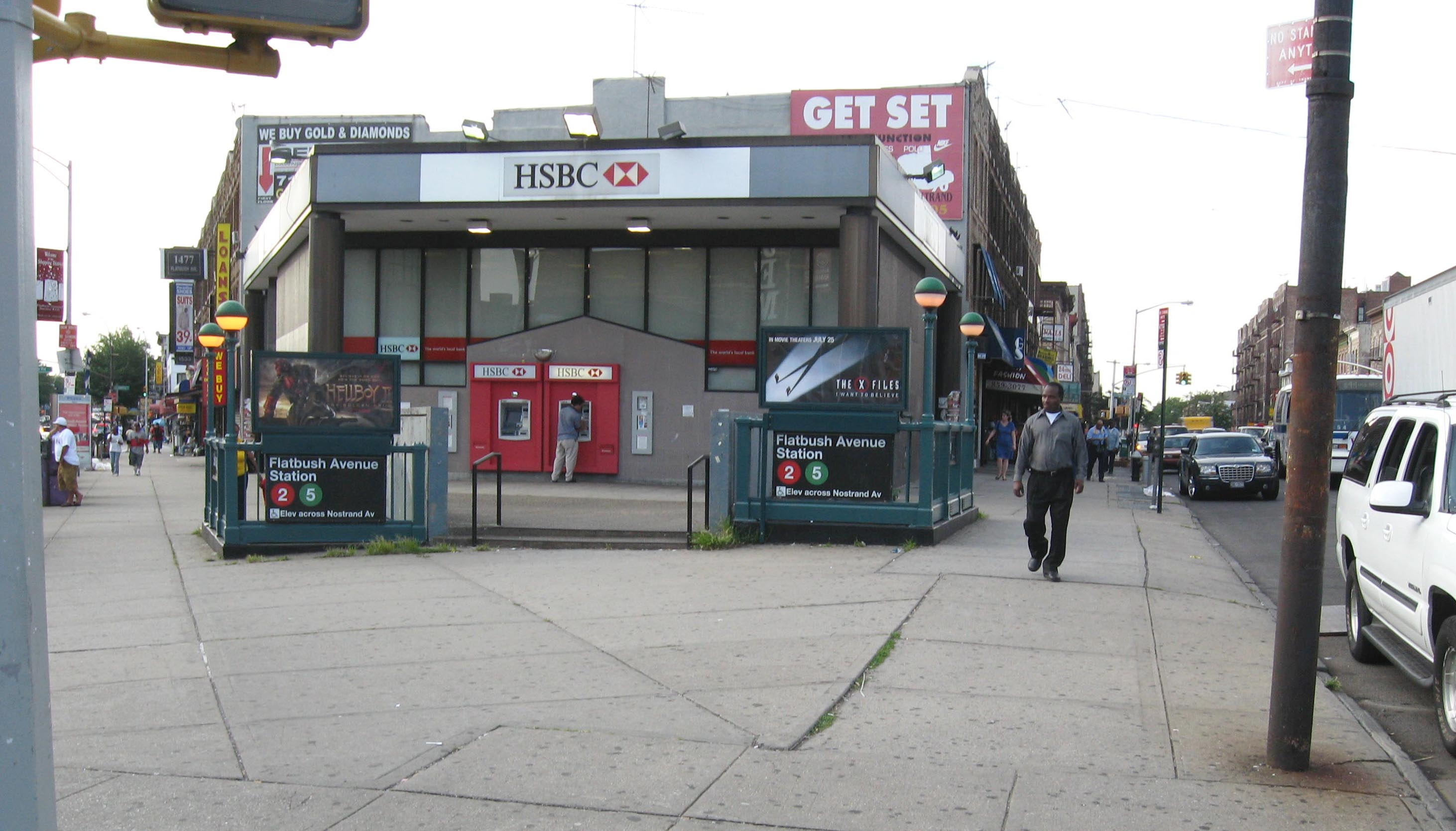
Station entrances on northwest corner of Flatbush Avenue & Nostrand Avenue

This station has two side platforms, which are connected at the south end just past the bumper blocks, forming a "U" shape. The presence of the connection at the southern end mitigates what is otherwise an inefficient terminal design, in which passengers must know which track a train is departing from before going to one of the two platforms. The station is served by the 2 train at all times and by the 5 train only on weekdays during the day. It is the southern terminus of all service; the next stop to the north is Newkirk Avenue–Little Haiti.

The IRT Nostrand Avenue Line tunnels continue beyond the bumper blocks at Flatbush Avenue and Nostrand Avenue. They extend for several hundred feet to Avenue H, but no tracks were ever laid in these tunnels. Up until about 2006, passengers could see the cemented-over gratings extending down Nostrand Avenue. When a new building went up, the grates were removed. Prior to the construction of the exit at the south end of the station, there was only a temporary wooden ramp connecting the platforms and the tunnels were actually visible to passengers.

When 5 trains run in Brooklyn and serve this station, all Manhattan-bound 2 trains depart from Track 3, and all Manhattan-bound 5 trains depart from Track 2. When 5 trains do not run in Brooklyn and serve this station, 2 trains depart from both tracks.

The station platforms have several doors for various non-public uses, including crew quarters. A 2 train crew office is on the Track 3 side, and a 5 train crew office is on the Track 2 side. There are public restrooms along Track 3 just within the station's main entrance. The columns along the platforms are painted light-blue.

The 1996 cast bronze relief artwork at this station is called Flatbush Floogies by Muriel Castanis.

=== Exits ===
At the U-shaped end, there is an unstaffed exit containing two HEET turnstiles and one exit-only turnstile. The single staircase here goes up to the west side of Nostrand Avenue north of Avenue H. The station's main entrance is on the Track 3 (eastern) platform. Two street stairs from each eastern corner of Nostrand and Flatbush Avenues lead to where the full-time token booth and two separate banks of turnstiles are. The single elevator from street level down to fare control is at the southeast corner. There is another entrance on the platform of Track 2 (west side). This entrance has two sets of street stairs adjacent to each other at the northwest corner of Flatbush Avenue and Nostrand Avenue. The token booth and turnstile bank are open weekdays only. A single HEET turnstile provides access to this entrance other times.
