= Freeman Street station =

New York City Subway station in the Bronx

Freeman Street
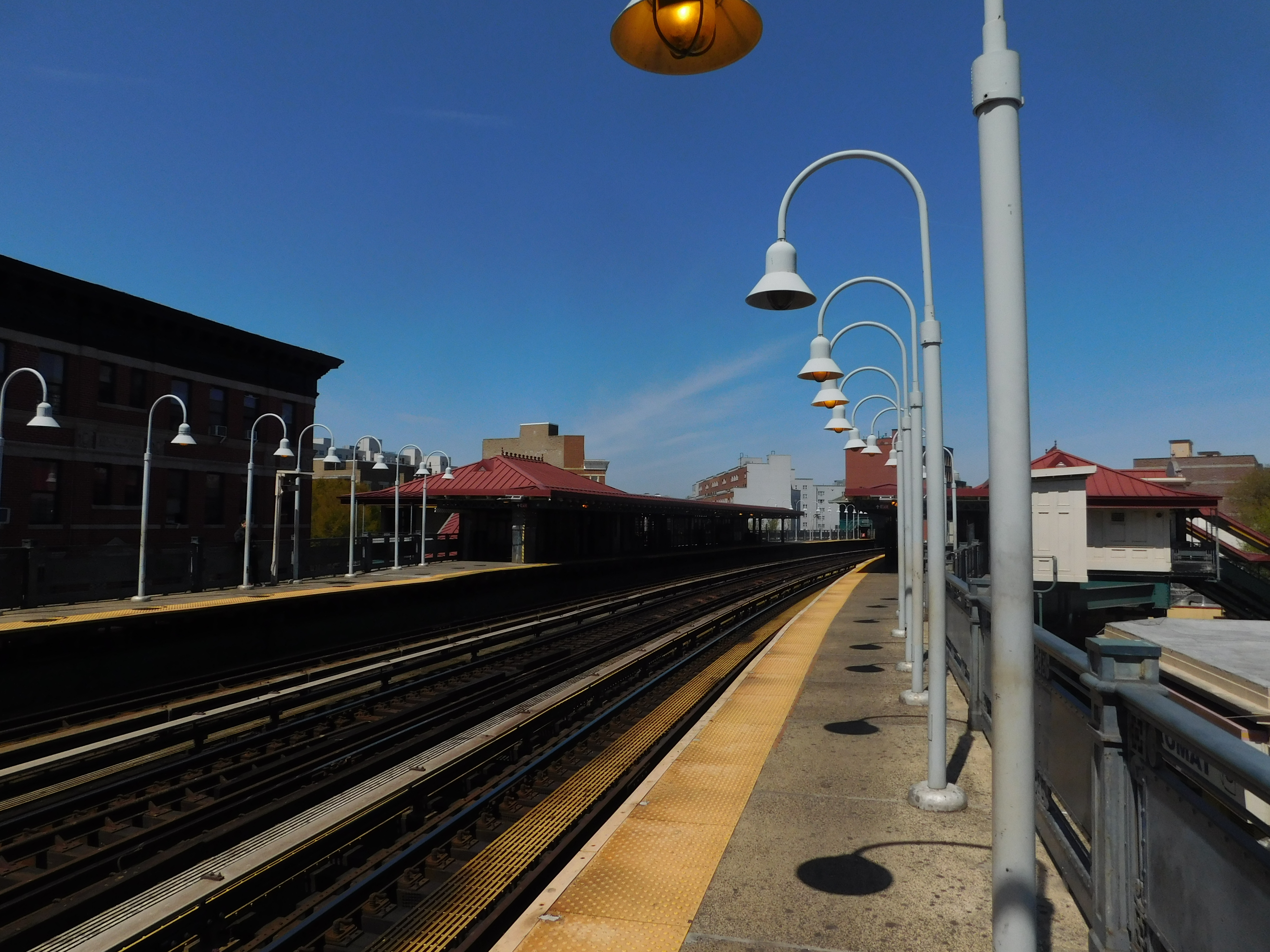
- Northbound platform

Station statistics
- Address: Freeman Street & Southern Boulevard; Bronx, New York
- Borough: The Bronx
- Locale: Crotona Park East
- Coordinates: 40.83°N 73.892°W
- Division: A (IRT)
- Line: IRT White Plains Road Line
- Services: 2 (all times); 5 (all times except rush hours in the peak direction and late nights)
- Transit: NYCT Bus: Bx19
- Structure: Elevated
- Platforms: 2 side platforms
- Tracks: 3

Other information
- Opened: November 26, 1904; 121 years ago (3rd Ave. Line; Bergen Avenue By-pass); July 10, 1905; 121 years ago (White Plains Rd. Line)

Traffic
- 2025: 926,268 ▲15%
- Rank: 328 out of 423
Services
Preceding station	New York City Subway	Following station
174th Street 2 5 via East 180th Street	Local	Simpson Street 2 5 toward Flatbush Avenue–Brooklyn College
Location
Location within New York City Subway
Location within New York City
Location within New York
Track layout
Street map
Station service legend
Symbol	Description
Stops all times	Stops all times
Stops all times except rush hours in the peak direction	Stops all times except rush hours in the peak direction

The Freeman Street station is a local station on the IRT White Plains Road Line of the New York City Subway. Located at the intersection of Freeman Street and Southern Boulevard in the Crotona Park East neighborhood of the Bronx, it is served by the 2 train at all times, and the 5 train at all times except late nights and rush hours in the peak direction. Departing passengers are asked to watch the gap upon leaving the train at this station.

== History ==
=== Early history ===
The first contract for the construction of a subway in New York, Contract 1, was executed on February 21, 1900, between the Board of Rapid Transit Railroad Commissioners and the Rapid Transit Construction Company, organized by John B. McDonald and funded by August Belmont, for the construction of the subway and a 50-year operating lease from the opening of the line. Contract 1 called for the construction of a line from City Hall north to Kingsbridge and a branch under Lenox Avenue and to Bronx Park. The initial segment of the IRT White Plains Road Line opened on November 26, 1904 between 180th Street–Bronx Park and Jackson Avenue. Initially, trains on the line were served by elevated trains from the IRT Second Avenue Line and the IRT Third Avenue Line. Once the connection to the IRT Lenox Avenue Line opened on July 10, 1905, trains from the newly opened IRT subway ran via the line.

To address overcrowding, in 1909, the New York Public Service Commission proposed lengthening the platforms at stations along the original IRT subway. As part of a modification to the IRT's construction contracts made on January 18, 1910, the company was to lengthen station platforms to accommodate ten-car express and six-car local trains. In addition to $1.5 million (equivalent to $51.8 million in 2025) spent on platform lengthening, $500,000 (equivalent to $17.3 million in 2025) was spent on building additional entrances and exits. It was anticipated that these improvements would increase capacity by 25 percent. The northbound platform at the Freeman Street station was extended 50 feet (15 m) to the front and 40 feet (12 m) to the rear, while the southbound platform was not lengthened. On January 23, 1911, ten-car express trains began running on the White Plains Road Line.

On December 29, 1914, the PSC approved a resolution approving a plan to construct an additional stairway to the station at the northeast corner of Southern Boulevard and Freeman Street. Work started on August 20, 1915, and was completed on October 29, 1915.

The New York City Board of Estimate approved a contract to construct a signal tower at the station's northern end on October 18, 1928.

=== Station renovations ===
The city government took over the IRT's operations on June 12, 1940. The New York State Transit Commission announced plans to extend the southbound platforms at seven stations on the line from Jackson Avenue to 177th Street to accommodate ten-car trains for $81,900 on August 8, 1934. The platform at Freeman Street would be lengthened from 350 feet (110 m) to 505 feet (154 m).

Up until 1946, a limited number of rush-hour northbound trains on the Second and Third Avenue Lines terminated at this station, relaying north of it to turn around for southbound service. The Bergen Avenue cutoff, which allowed Third Avenue trains to access the White Plains Road Line, was abandoned on November 5, 1946, as part of the gradual curtailment of elevated service on the IRT Third Avenue Line. On June 13, 1949, the platform extensions at this station, as well as those on White Plains Road Line stations between Jackson Avenue and 177th Street, opened. The platforms were lengthened to 514 feet (157 m) to allow full ten-car express trains to open their doors. Previously, the stations could only platform six-car local trains.

The station was renovated between July and October 2004. The interlocking north of the station and the tower controlling it were both removed in March 2004 when the line was re-signaled to B Division specifications.

== Station layout ==
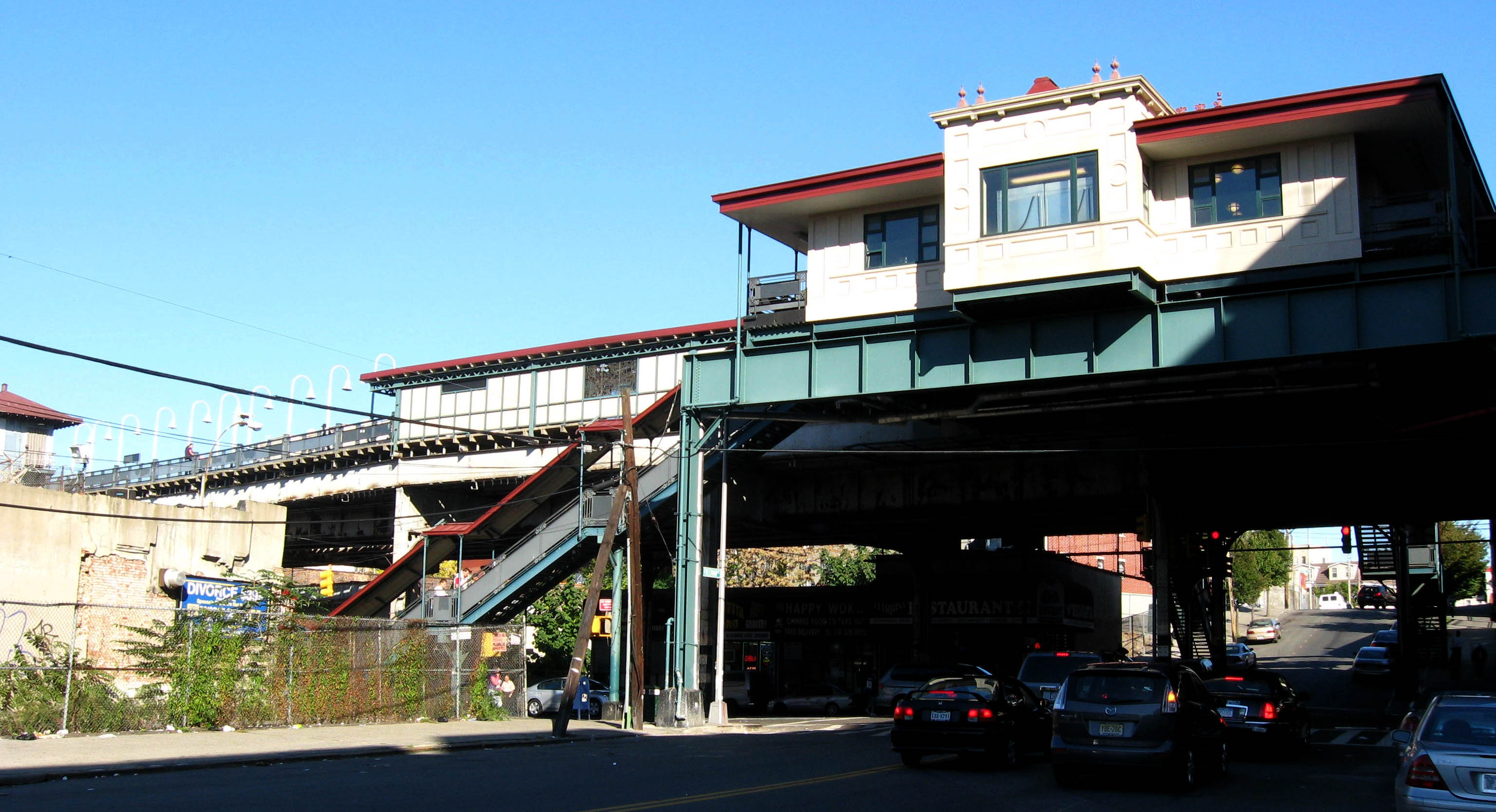
Northern street stair

This elevated station has three tracks and two side platforms. The center express track is used by the 5 train during rush hours in the peak direction.

As with other original IRT elevated viaducts, the elevated structure at Freeman Street is carried on two column bents, one on each side of the road, at places where the tracks are no more than 29 feet (8.8 m) above the ground level. There is zigzag lateral bracing at intervals of every four panels.

The 2007 artwork at this station, The El, was designed by the artist Daniel Hauben and commissioned through the MTA Arts & Design program. It consists of four faceted-glass windbreaks and two niche windows, depicting the roadway and the elevated tracks above, which recede in the background. According to the artist, the artwork is designed to convey a "feeling of both great depth and the sprawling vastness of the city".

=== Exits ===
The station has heaters, as well as a wooden mezzanine, floor, and open old booth similar to the one at Simpson Street. Exits lead to all corners of Freeman Street and Southern Boulevard.
