= Simpson Street station =

New York City Subway station in the Bronx

Simpson Street
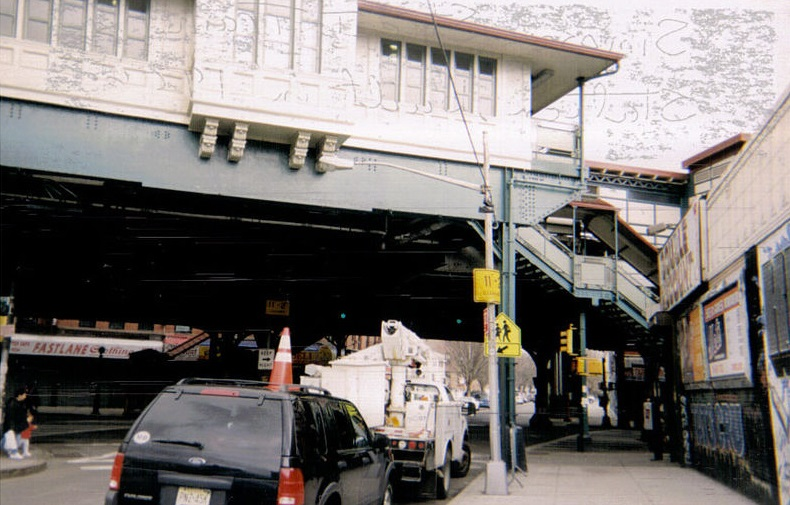
- Station house as viewed from the street

Station statistics
- Address: Simpson Street & Westchester Avenue; Bronx, New York
- Borough: The Bronx
- Locale: Longwood
- Coordinates: 40.824°N 73.893°W
- Division: A (IRT)
- Line: IRT White Plains Road Line
- Services: 2 (all times); 5 (all times except rush hours in the peak direction and late nights)
- Transit: NYCT Bus: Bx4, Bx4A, Bx5, Bx19, Bx27
- Structure: Elevated
- Platforms: 2 side platforms
- Tracks: 3

Other information
- Opened: November 26, 1904; 121 years ago (3rd Ave. Line; Bergen Avenue By-pass); July 10, 1905; 121 years ago (White Plains Rd. Line)
- Accessible: Yes

Traffic
- 2025: 1,669,151 ▲22.5%
- Rank: 210 out of 423
Services
Preceding station	New York City Subway	Following station
Freeman Street 2 5 via East 180th Street	Local	Intervale Avenue 2 5 toward Flatbush Avenue–Brooklyn College
Location
Location within New York City Subway
Location within New York City
Location within New York
Track layout
Street map
Station service legend
Symbol	Description
Stops all times	Stops all times
Stops all times except rush hours in the peak direction	Stops all times except rush hours in the peak direction
- Simpson Street Subway Station and Substation #18 (IRT)
- U.S. National Register of Historic Places
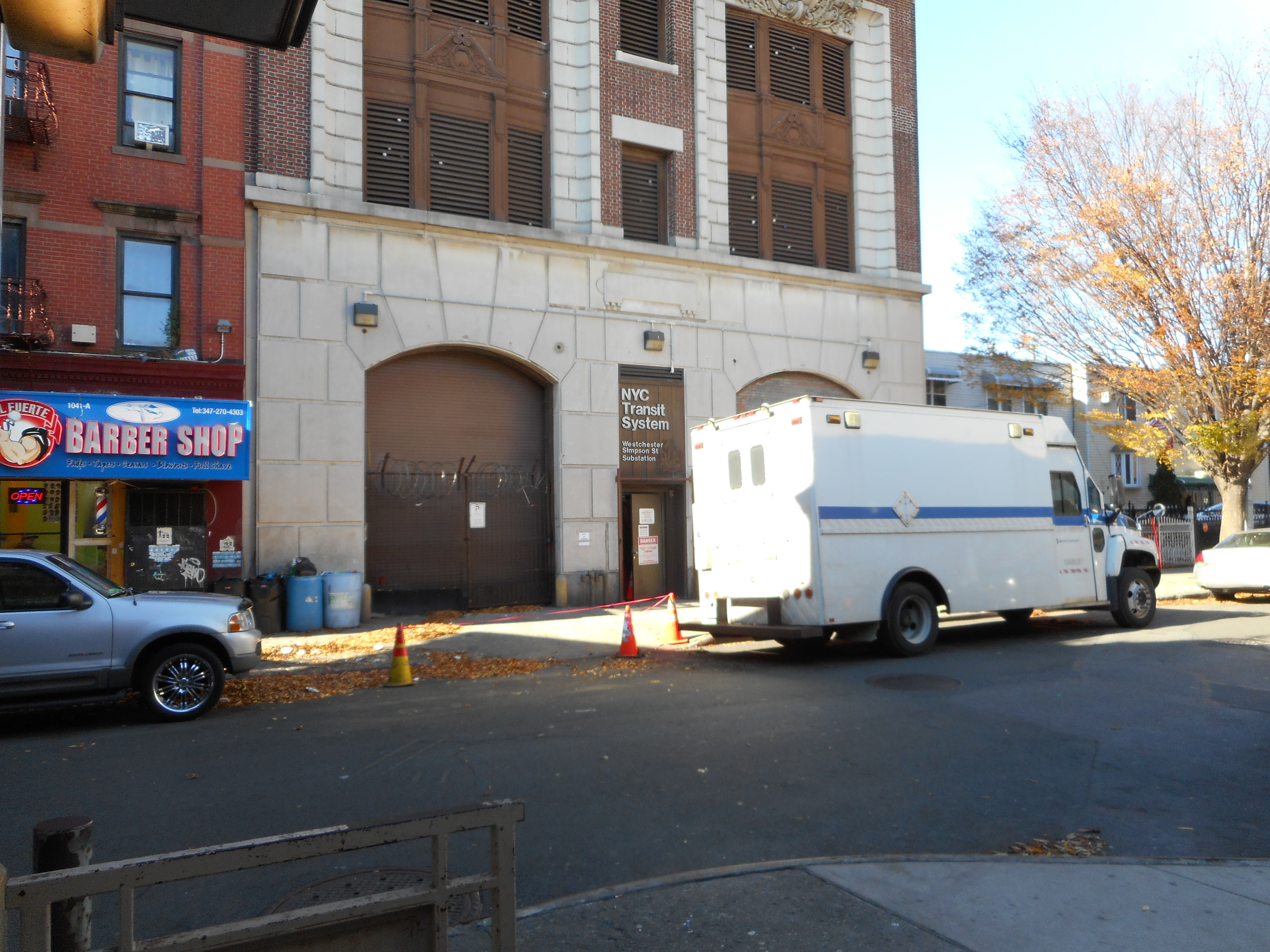
- The accompanying IRT Substation #18 at 1043 Simpson Street less than one block north of the subway station.
- MPS: New York City Subway System MPS
- NRHP reference No.: 04001027
- Added to NRHP: September 17, 2004

The Simpson Street station is a local station on the IRT White Plains Road Line of the New York City Subway. Located at the intersection of Simpson Street and Westchester Avenue in the Longwood neighborhood of the Bronx, it is served by the 2 train at all times, and the 5 train at all times except late nights and rush hours in the peak direction.

When first built, it only had service for IRT 3rd Ave El Trains; It later was connected to the modern 1904 IRT Subway.

== History ==
=== Early history ===
The initial segment of the IRT White Plains Road Line opened on November 26, 1904, between 180th Street–Bronx Park and Jackson Avenue. Initially, trains on the line were served by elevated trains from the IRT Second Avenue Line and the IRT Third Avenue Line. Once the connection to the IRT Lenox Avenue Line opened on July 10, 1905, trains from the newly opened IRT subway ran via the line.

To address overcrowding, in 1909, the New York Public Service Commission proposed lengthening the platforms at stations along the original IRT subway. As part of a modification to the IRT's construction contracts made on January 18, 1910, the company was to lengthen station platforms to accommodate ten-car express and six-car local trains. In addition to $1.5 million (equivalent to $51.8 million in 2025) spent on platform lengthening, $500,000 (equivalent to $17.3 million in 2025) was spent on building additional entrances and exits. It was anticipated that these improvements would increase capacity by 25 percent. The northbound platform at the Simpson Street station was extended 50 feet (15 m) to the front and 55 feet (17 m) to the rear, while the southbound platform was not lengthened. On January 23, 1911, ten-car express trains began running on the White Plains Road Line.

=== Later years ===
The New York State Transit Commission announced plans to extend the southbound platforms at seven stations on the line from Jackson Avenue to 177th Street, including Simpson Street to accommodate ten-car trains for $81,900 on August 8, 1934.

The city government took over the IRT's operations on June 12, 1940. The Bergen Avenue cutoff, which allowed Third Avenue trains to access the White Plains Road Line, was abandoned on November 5, 1946, as part of the gradual curtailment of elevated service on the IRT Third Avenue Line. On June 13, 1949, the platform extensions at this station, as well as those on White Plains Road Line stations between Jackson Avenue and 177th Street, opened. The platforms were lengthened to 514 feet (157 m) to allow full ten-car express trains to open their doors. Previously the stations could only accommodate six-car local trains.

The station was renovated in the early 2000s. This station was listed on the National Register of Historic Places on September 17, 2004, along with the Westchester-Simpson Street Substation, also known as IRT Substation #18.

== Station layout ==
The station during a snowfall

This station has two side platforms and three tracks. The center express track is used by the 5 train during rush hours in the peak direction. To the north, the line curves from Westchester Avenue to Southern Boulevard. The IRT Pelham Line (6 and <6> trains), which curves above Westchester Avenue five blocks northeast of this station, is visible from the east end of the platforms.

As with other original IRT elevated viaducts, the elevated structure at Simpson Street is carried on two column bents, one on each side of the road, at places where the tracks are no more than 29 feet (8.8 m) above the ground level. There is zigzag lateral bracing at intervals of every four panels.

Both platforms have cream-colored windscreens and red canopies. Both platforms also have green outlines, frames, and support columns in their center and green waist-high, ornament-style steel fences at either ends with several lampposts. The station's signs are in the standard black name plates with white Helvetica lettering.

=== Exits ===
Due to the tracks' low height above ground, both station houses are at platform level and there are no crossovers or crossunders. Elevators from the street to each platform make this station ADA-accessible. The station's elevators were installed in August 1989, making the station one of the earliest to comply with the Americans with Disabilities Act of 1990.

The southbound platform (for trains headed to Manhattan) has a station house that is staffed full-time and contains several sets of doors leading to the small waiting area from the platform, a turnstile bank, token booth, two staircases going down to either northern corners of Simpson Street and Westchester Avenue, and one elevator going down to the northeast corner. A high exit-only turnstile on either side of the station house leads directly to one of the street stairs from the platform.

The northbound platform's station house is unstaffed, containing several sets of doors leading to the small waiting area from the platform, a bank of three turnstiles, two staircases going down to either southern corners of Simpson Street and Westchester Avenue, and one elevator going down to the southwest corner. It had a customer assistance booth until April 2010. A high exit-only turnstile on either side of the station house leads directly to one of the street stairs from the platform.

=== Artwork ===
The 2006 artwork here is called What We Build is Not Permanent, We Are Not What We Build by Lisa Amowitz. It consists of stained glass panels on the platform windscreens and station houses with the theme with renewing or rebuilding what has died or fallen.
