= 174th Street station (IRT White Plains Road Line) =

New York City Subway station in the Bronx

174 Street
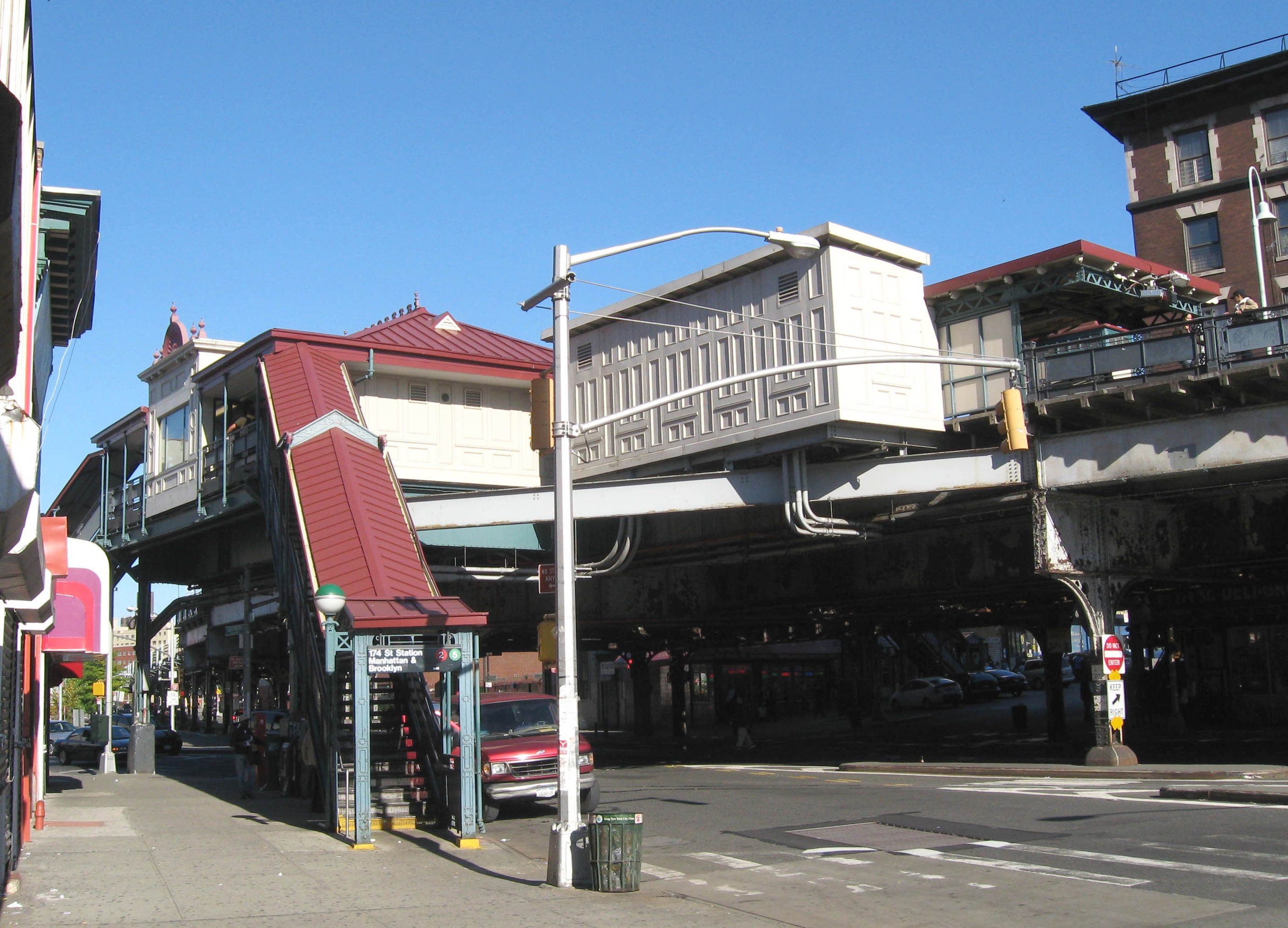
- View of the Station house with southeast entrance to the station

Station statistics
- Address: East 174th Street, Southern Boulevard, & Boston Road; Bronx, New York
- Borough: The Bronx
- Locale: Crotona Park East
- Coordinates: 40.837°N 73.888°W
- Division: A (IRT)
- Line: IRT White Plains Road Line
- Services: 2 (all times); 5 (all times except rush hours in the peak direction and late nights)
- Transit: NYCT Bus: Bx11, Bx19, Bx21
- Structure: Elevated
- Platforms: 2 side platforms
- Tracks: 3

Other information
- Opened: November 26, 1904; 121 years ago

Traffic
- 2025: 1,328,081 ▲25.3%
- Rank: 253 out of 423
Services
Preceding station	New York City Subway	Following station
West Farms Square–East Tremont Avenue 2 5 via East 180th Street	Local	Freeman Street 2 5 toward Flatbush Avenue–Brooklyn College
Location
Location within New York City Subway
Location within New York City
Location within New York
Track layout
Street map
Station service legend
Symbol	Description
Stops all times	Stops all times
Stops all times except rush hours in the peak direction	Stops all times except rush hours in the peak direction

The 174th Street station is a local station on the IRT White Plains Road Line of the New York City Subway. Located at the intersection of 174th Street, Southern Boulevard and Boston Road in the Crotona Park East neighborhood of the Bronx, it is served by the 2 train at all times, and the 5 train at all times except late nights and rush hours in the peak direction.

== History ==
=== Early history ===
The initial segment of the IRT White Plains Road Line opened on November 26, 1904, between 180th Street–Bronx Park and Jackson Avenue. Initially, trains on the line were served by elevated trains from the IRT Second Avenue Line and the IRT Third Avenue Line. Once the connection to the IRT Lenox Avenue Line opened on July 10, 1905, trains from the newly opened IRT subway ran via the line.

To address overcrowding, in 1909, the New York Public Service Commission (PSC) proposed lengthening the platforms at stations along the original IRT subway. As part of a modification to the IRT's construction contracts made on January 18, 1910, the company was to lengthen station platforms to accommodate ten-car express and six-car local trains. In addition to $1.5 million (equivalent to $51.8 million in 2025) spent on platform lengthening, $500,000 (equivalent to $17.3 million in 2025) was spent on building additional entrances and exits. It was anticipated that these improvements would increase capacity by 25 percent. The northbound platform at the 174th Street station was extended 43 feet (13 m) to the front and 40 feet (12 m) to the rear, while the southbound platform was not lengthened. On January 23, 1911, ten-car express trains began running on the White Plains Road Line.

On June 18, 1915, the PSC approved a resolution approving a plan to relocate two supporting columns and one stairway at the station to accommodate the widening of 174th Street. The work, which was paid for by the borough of the Bronx, started on May 2, 1916, and was completed in August 1916.

=== Later years ===
The New York State Transit Commission announced plans to extend the southbound platforms at seven stations on the line from Jackson Avenue to 177th Street to accommodate ten-car trains for $81,900 on August 8, 1934. The platform at 174th Street would be lengthened from 361 feet (110 m) to 489 feet (149 m).

The city government took over the IRT's operations on June 12, 1940. The Bergen Avenue cutoff, which allowed Third Avenue trains to access the White Plains Road Line, was abandoned on November 5, 1946, as part of the gradual curtailment of elevated service on the IRT Third Avenue Line. On June 13, 1949, the platform extensions at this station, as well as those on other White Plains Road Line stations between Jackson Avenue and 177th Street, opened. The platforms were lengthened to 514 feet (157 m) to allow full ten-car express trains to open their doors. Previously, the stations could only accommodate six-car local trains.

The station was closed from July to November 2003 and was completely rehabilitated. The station reopened on November 24, 2003, after undergoing a $12 million renovation.

== Station layout ==
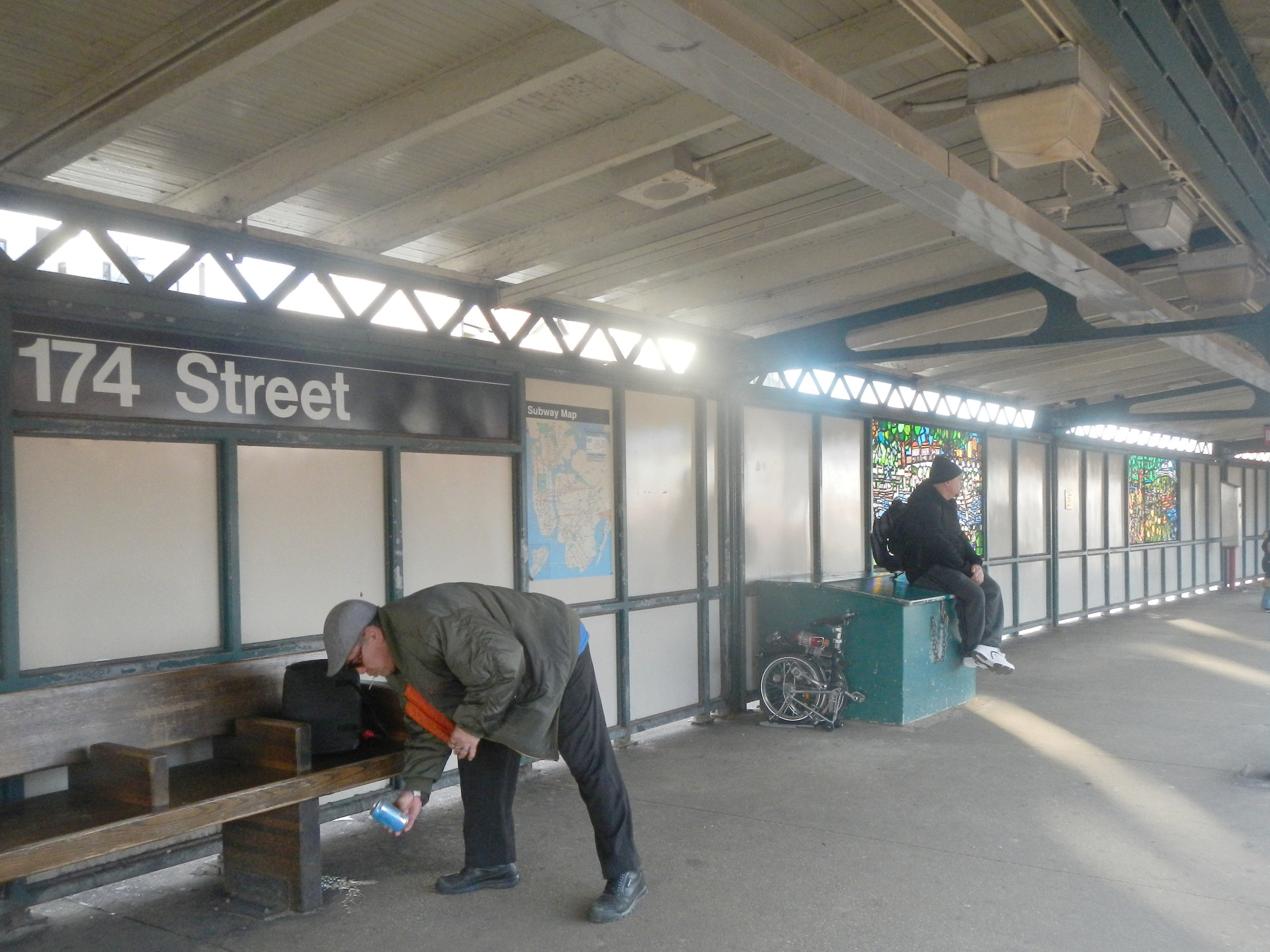
Southbound platform

This elevated station, which has two side platforms and three tracks, is built on a curve, which results in large gaps between the center doors of trains and the platform. The gaps were almost wide enough to need gap fillers. By 2008, most of the station's gaps had been filled, but train announcements still warn passengers to "be careful of the gap between the platform and the train."

The station has a white windscreen and black fencing. The ends of the platform are very narrow.

The 2004 artwork here is called A Trip up the Bronx River by Daniel del Valle. It features stained glass windows on the platform windscreens and station house depicting sites along the Bronx River.

=== Exits ===
The station does not have a mezzanine, therefore in-system transfers between the two directions are not possible. The station houses are at the same level as the platforms. The two southbound exits lead to the northwestern corner of the skewed intersection of 174th Street and Southern Boulevard. The two northbound exits are on either eastern corner of that intersection.
