= IRT White Plains Road Line =

New York City Subway line

- The 2 train serves the entire IRT White Plains Road Line at all times. The 5 train serves the entire IRT White Plains Road Line (except for Wakefield–241st Street) during rush hours in the peak direction, and part of the line from 149th Street-Hostos to East 180th Street at all other times except late nights.

Overview
- Owner: City of New York
- Locale: The Bronx, New York City
- Termini: Wakefield–241st Street; 149th Street–Hostos
- Stations: 20

Service
- Type: Rapid transit
- System: New York City Subway
- Operator: New York City Transit Authority
- Daily ridership: 134,801 (2023)

History
- Opened: November 26, 1904; 121 years ago
- Last extension: 1920

Technical
- Num of tracks: 2-3
- Character: Elevated (Most of the line); Underground (3rd Ave and Grand Concourse stations only)
- Track gauge: 4 ft 8 1/2 in (1,435 mm)
- Electrification: 600V DC third rail
Route map
| Express station | Local station | Closed station |

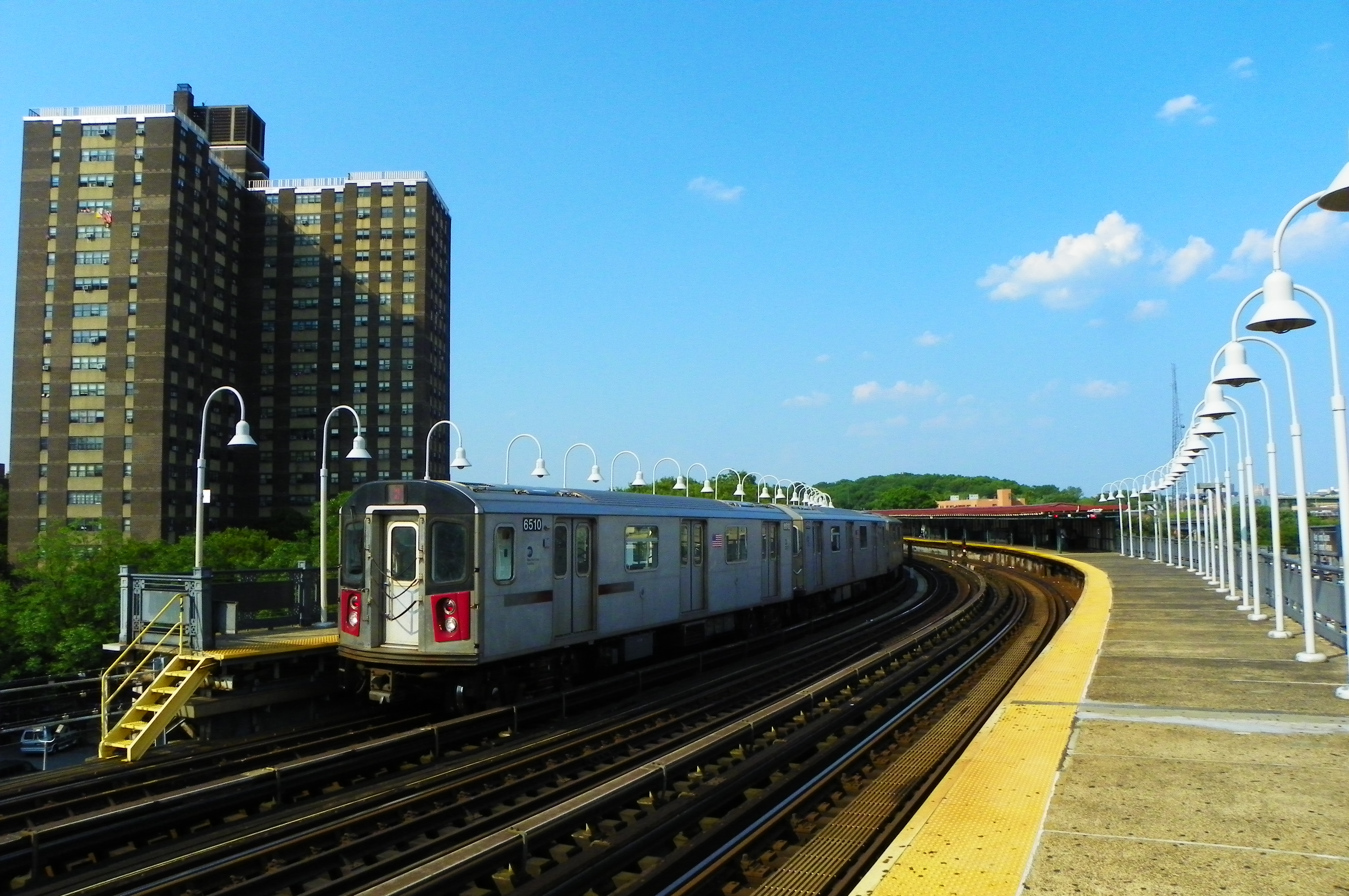
West Farms Square station is a southern station of the White Plains Road Line.

The White Plains Road Line is a rapid transit line of the A Division of the New York City Subway serving the central Bronx. It is mostly elevated and served both subway and elevated trains until 1952. The original part of the line, the part opened as part of the first subway was called the West Farms Division, and the extension north to 241st Street as part of the Dual Contracts was called the White Plains Road Line. Eventually, however, the two parts came to be known as the White Plains Road Line.

It is currently being used by the 2 at all times and the 5 at all times except late nights. During rush hours in the peak direction, the 5 runs express between East 180th Street and Third Avenue–149th Street. During late nights, the 5 runs as a shuttle between Eastchester–Dyre Avenue and East 180th Street.

== Extent and service ==
The following services use part or all of the IRT White Plains Road Line:

| Route | | Services | | | | |
| | Time period | West of 149 St-Hostos | Between 149 St-Hostos and E 180 St | E 180 St | Between E 180 St and Nereid Ave | 241 St |
|---|---|---|---|---|---|---|
| "2" train | All times | Local | | | | |
| "5" train | Rush peak | No service | Express | Local (some trains) | | No service |
| "5" train | Off-peak except late nights | No service | Local | | No service | |
| "5" train | Late nights | No service | | Center track | No service | |

The IRT White Plains Road Line begins at the Wakefield–241st Street terminal, with two tracks, one island platform, and two closed side platforms. Crossovers just south of the station take trains to the correct tracks and a center express track comes out of those crossovers. Between Wakefield–241st Street and Nereid Avenue, a connection comes in from the 239th Street Yard.

Just north of Gun Hill Road, the now demolished IRT Third Avenue Line split from the local tracks (with crossovers to the express tracks just to the north). The line went to a lower level of Gun Hill Road and then turned west.

The IRT Dyre Avenue Line merges to the local tracks just north of East 180th Street, and then crossovers allow those trains to reach the express tracks. The 5 late-night Dyre Avenue Shuttle uses the center track to end its run, and rush hour 5 trains in the peak direction change to the express track here. On the west side of this junction is the East 180th Street Yard while the Unionport Yard is to the east.

The now-gone three-track Bronx Park Spur merged from the west after East 180th Street with one track into each of the mainline tracks. Just after this on the east side was a connection to the West Farms Yard, also gone.

The express track ends north of Third Avenue–149th Street, and from there to the end the line has two tracks. Formerly in that area there was a connection just to the north to the local tracks of the IRT Third Avenue Line, and a connection to the south, bypassing 149th Street on the Third Avenue Line. Just past those former connections, the White Plains Road Line goes underground.

Just after 149th Street–Hostos, the tracks split off and the two currently used by the 5 train turn south to merge with the local tracks of the IRT Jerome Avenue Line. The other tracks, currently used by the 2 train, pass under the Harlem River via the 149th Street Tunnel and end at the at-grade 142nd Street Junction, connecting to the IRT Lenox Avenue Line.

== History ==
=== Contract 1 ===
The first contract for the construction of a subway in New York, Contract 1, was executed on February 21, 1900, between the Board of Rapid Transit Railroad Commissioners and the Rapid Transit Construction Company, organized by John B. McDonald and funded by August Belmont, for the construction of the subway and a 50-year operating lease from the opening of the line. Contract 1 called for the construction of a line from City Hall north to Kingsbridge and a branch under Lenox Avenue and to Bronx Park.

In August 1902, it was reported that the Rapid Transit Commission (RTC) had decided to spend an additional $400,000 to have the elevated portion of the line in the Bronx be constructed with three tracks instead of two.

On May 29, 1903, a proposal by August Belmont to speed up the opening of the subway line to Bronx Park by operating it with elevated trains was presented at a meeting of the RTC. The proposal required the speeding up of the line's construction between Brook Avenue and Bronx Park to have it complete within four or five months, and the commission's permission to construct a connection along Brook Avenue between Westchester Avenue and Third Avenue, where a track connection would be provided to the Third Avenue Elevated. If the proposal was approved, a portion of the line could be open by the fall.

On January 11, 1905, Assemblyman William J. Ellis introduced legislation that would block the RTC's proposed extension of the line through Bronx Park via a new elevated structure. The RTC abandoned its proposal at a public hearing the following day.

The initial segment of the IRT White Plains Road Line opened on November 26, 1904 between East 180th Street and Jackson Avenue. Initially, trains on the line were served by elevated trains from the IRT Second Avenue Line and the IRT Third Avenue Line, with a connection running from the Third Avenue local tracks at Third Avenue and 149th Street to Westchester Avenue and Eagle Avenue. Once the connection to the IRT Lenox Avenue Line opened on July 10, 1905, trains from the newly opened IRT subway ran via the line. Elevated service via this connection was resumed on October 1, 1907 when Second Avenue locals were extended to Freeman Street during rush hours.

On October 28, 1910, the new 180th Street station, known as Zoological Park station, opened as the new terminal of the West Farms Division of the subway, replacing the temporary station at 180th Street, which was later abandoned.

=== Dual Contracts ===
Map of the IRT White Plains Road Line and its former spurs

The Dual Contracts, which were signed on March 19, 1913, were contracts for the construction, rehabilitation, and operation of rapid transit lines in the City of New York. The contracts were "dual" in that they were signed between the City and two separate private companies (the Interborough Rapid Transit Company and the Brooklyn Rapid Transit Company), all working together to make the construction of the Dual Contracts possible. The Dual Contracts promised the construction of several lines in the Bronx. As part of Contract 3, the IRT agreed to extend the existing West Farms Division from 179th Street to 241st Street as an elevated line along White Plains Road.

Intervale Avenue station opened on April 30, 1910 as an in-fill station. It was the first station in the Bronx with escalators. The station was built at the cost of $100,000, and it was paid with private capital.

Portions of the White Plains Road Line were opened at different times, and they opened once construction finished on a segment, as opposed to waiting for the completion of the entire line. The first segment opened on March 3, 1917, from East 177th Street–East Tremont Avenue to East 219th Street–White Plains Road, providing the Bronx communities of Williamsbridge and Wakefield with access to rapid transit service. Service on the new portion of the line was operated as a four-car shuttle from 177th Street due to the power conditions at the time. Service was extended to East 238th Street on March 31, 1917. The part of the line from the S-curve north of West Farms Square—East Tremont Avenue station to the terminal at 241st Street was built as a part of the Dual Contracts.

On July 1, 1917, a new connection between the White Plains Road Line and the Third Avenue el express tracks opened as part of the Dual Contracts expansion of the Third Avenue Line, and since it ran via Bergen Avenue and bypassed the 149th Street station, it was called the Bergen Avenue cutoff or bypass. The Bergen Avenue cutoff was abandoned on November 5, 1946, as part of the gradual curtailment of elevated service on the IRT Third Avenue Line. The cutoff was removed in 1950.

On December 13, 1920, the final portion of the line opened, extending the line from its previous terminal at 238th Street to the line's permanent terminus at 241st Street. This portion of the line had its opening delayed, owing to construction on the line between the two stations for the construction of the 239th Street Yard. Additional time was required to modify the structure to avoid a grade crossing at the entrance to the yard.

A 1929 proposal included a spur off the line that would have run from Van Nest to Baychester. The spur was to begin near Garfield Street as an elevated line then run underground beneath Morris Park Avenue and Wilson Avenue, finally terminating at Boston Road, where it was to connect to the formerly proposed Concourse Line extension. This proposal was never carried out, however the IRT acquired the former New York, Westchester and Boston Railway right-of-way to create the IRT Dyre Avenue Line instead.

=== Improvements ===
The New York State Transit Commission announced plans to extend the southbound platforms at seven stations on the line from Jackson Avenue to 177th Street to accommodate ten-car trains for $81,900 on August 8, 1934.

On June 13, 1949, the platforms extensions at the stations on the line from Jackson Avenue to 177th Street opened. The platforms were lengthened to 514 feet (157 m) to allow full ten-car express trains to platform. Previously the stations could only platform six-car local trains.

On March 1, 1951, the Board of Transportation announced a plan to implement express service along the White Plains Road Line between 241st Street and Third Avenue–149th Street using the middle third track. New signaling, including the installation of block signals, was to be installed on the local tracks, in addition to the installation of signals on the express track at the cost of $3.5 million. In addition, it was announced that a flyover to the Dyre Avenue Line would be built, allowing for through-service, and eliminating the need to transfer at East 180th Street. The final key element to the improvement plan was the elimination of the at-grade junction north of the West Farms Square station, which was a major bottleneck, by closing the spur to 180th Street–Bronx Park. To make up for the loss of service, an escalator and new stairway would be added at the West Farms Square station at 178th Street and Boston Road. The spur to 180th Street—Bronx Park closed on August 4, 1952.

Express service on the IRT White Plains Road Line began on April 23, 1953 with alternate 5 trains using the middle track between East 180th Street and 149th Street during the weekday rush in the peak direction. These trains skipped all stops between East 180th Street and Third Avenue–149th Street. Starting on October 2, 1953, 5 trains began running express between East 180th Street and Gun Hill Road using the middle track in order to encourage passengers who changed at Gun Hill Road for Third Avenue Elevated service to stay on subway trains. These trains were signed as the 5 Lexington Avenue Thru-Express.

The Dyre Avenue Line was connected directly to the White Plains Road Line north of East 180th Street for $3 million and through service began on May 6, 1957. Night service continued to be operated by a shuttle. Through service was operated by Seventh Avenue express trains between 5:30 AM and 8:30 PM. Between 8:30 and 1:15 shuttle trains operated from East 180th Street to Dyre Avenue, and in the early morning hours no trains operated over the line.

In 1986, the New York City Transit Authority launched a study to determine whether to close 79 stations on 11 routes, including the White Plains Road Line north of East 180th Street, due to low ridership and high repair costs. Numerous figures, including New York City Council member Carol Greitzer, criticized the plans.

Due to rehabilitation of East 180th Street and signal replacements along the line, rush hour peak direction 5 express service was suspended from March 29 to September 3, 2010. PM northbound express service was suspended again on March 28, 2011 to allow for the second phase of the signal replacement project. Normal service was restored on August 8, 2011.

== Station listing ==
Station service legend
| Stops all times | Stops 24 hours a day |
| Stops all times except late nights | Stops every day during daytime hours only |
| Stops all times except rush hours in the peak direction | Stops 24 hours a day, except during weekday rush hours in the peak direction |
| Stops rush hours in the peak direction only | Stops during weekday rush hours in the peak direction only |
Time period details
| Disabled access | Station is compliant with the Americans with Disabilities Act |
| ↑ | Station is compliant with the Americans with Disabilities Act in the indicated direction only |
| ↓ | Station is compliant with the Americans with Disabilities Act in the indicated direction only |
| | Elevator access to mezzanine only |

| Neighborhood (approximate) | Disabled access | Station | Tracks | Services | Opened | Transfers and notes |
|---|---|---|---|---|---|---|
| Wakefield | | Wakefield–241st Street | | 2 | December 13, 1920 | originally East 241st Street; Connection to Metro-North Railroad (Harlem Line at Wakefield) |
| Wakefield | Center Express track begins (no regular service) | | | | | |
| Wakefield | connecting tracks to 239th Street Yard | | | | | |
| Wakefield | | Nereid Avenue | local | 2 5 | March 31, 1917 | originally East 238th Street |
| Wakefield | Disabled access | 233rd Street | local | 2 5 | March 31, 1917 | originally East 233rd Street; Connection to Metro-North Railroad (Harlem Line at Woodlawn) |
| Wakefield | | 225th Street | local | 2 5 | March 31, 1917 | originally East 225th Street |
| Williamsbridge | | 219th Street | local | 2 5 | March 3, 1917 | originally East 219th Street |
| Williamsbridge | Disabled access | Gun Hill Road | all | 2 5 | March 3, 1917 | Connection to Metro-North Railroad (Harlem Line at Williams Bridge) Bx41 Select Bus Service |
| Allerton | | Burke Avenue | local | 2 5 | March 3, 1917 | |
| Allerton | | Allerton Avenue | local | 2 5 | March 3, 1917 | |
| Pelham Parkway | Disabled access | Pelham Parkway | local | 2 5 | March 3, 1917 | Bx12 Select Bus Service |
| Van Nest | | Bronx Park East | local | 2 5 | March 3, 1917 | |
| Van Nest | Merge from IRT Dyre Avenue Line (5 ) | | | | | |
| Van Nest | connecting tracks to Unionport Yard (east of the line) | | | | | |
| Van Nest | connecting tracks to East 180th Street Yard (west of the line) | | | | | |
| West Farms | Disabled access | East 180th Street | all | 2 5 | March 3, 1917 | |
| West Farms | | 180th Street–Bronx Park | Bronx Park spur | | November 26, 1904 | Closed August 4, 1952; later demolished. |
| West Farms | | West Farms Square–East Tremont Avenue | local | 2 5 | November 26, 1904 | originally 177th Street, then East Tremont Avenue–Boston Road; Q44 Select Bus Service |
| Crotona Park East | | 174th Street | local | 2 5 | November 26, 1904 | |
| Crotona Park East | | Freeman Street | local | 2 5 | November 26, 1904 | |
| Longwood | Disabled access | Simpson Street | local | 2 5 | November 26, 1904 | |
| Longwood | | Intervale Avenue | local | 2 5 | April 30, 1910 | originally Intervale Avenue–163rd Street; Bx6 Select Bus Service |
| Longwood | | Prospect Avenue | local | 2 5 | November 26, 1904 | |
| Mott Haven | | Jackson Avenue | local | 2 5 | November 26, 1904 | |
| Mott Haven | Center Express track ends | | | | | |
| Mott Haven | Disabled access | Third Avenue–149th Street | all | 2 5 | July 10, 1905 | originally Third Avenue Bx41 Select Bus Service |
| Mott Haven | Disabled access | 149th Street–Hostos | all | 2 5 | July 10, 1905 | 4 (IRT Jerome Avenue Line) originally Mott Avenue Renamed again to 149 St-Hostos in 2026 |
| Mott Haven | Split with connection to IRT Jerome Avenue Line (5 ) | | | | | |
149th Street Tunnel
Merge with IRT Lenox Avenue Line (2 )
