= Daniel Hauben =

American painter

Daniel Hauben (born May 23, 1956, Bronx, NY) is an American painter who grew up in the Bronx, and who often paints Bronx street scenes. Hauben has also painted outdoors around the world.

== Education ==
Hauben studied at the Museum School in Boston, MA and received a B.A. from the School of Visual Arts in NYC. Hauben works in such mediums as oils, textural oil relief, chalk pastel, etchings, bronze, cast paper, plaster, and glass.

== Collections ==
Hauben's work is in the collections of the Library of Congress, the White House, the Museum of the City of New York, the New York Public Library, the New York Historical Society, the Jane Voorhees Zimmerli Art Museum, the Villa-Haiss Museum, Pfizer Corporation, Harvard University, and in numerous other public and private collections.

== Exhibitions ==
Hauben has had solo exhibitions at the Bronx Museum of the Arts, the Michael Ingbar Gallery, Ache 700 Gallery in Austria, Amerika Haus in Berlin and the Deutsches-Amerikanisches Zentrum in Stuttgart, among others. Selected group exhibitions include: Lehman College Art Gallery, The Painting Center, John Szoke Gallery, Allan Stone Gallery, and the Kunst und Gewerbeverein in Regensburg, Germany.

Hauben has painted in India, Costa Rica, Italy, Germany, France, Spain, Hungary and Denmark, as well as in the US states of Virginia, California, Connecticut, Maine and Massachusetts. He has painted in Virginia extensively, where he has been an artist-in-residence at the Virginia Center for the Creative Arts numerous times. He has also received residencies at Djerassi Art Colony and Villa Montalvo in California, Weir Farm in Connecticut, the Julia and David White Colony in Costa Rica, Fundacion Valparaiso in Spain, and the Oberpfaelzer Kuenstlerhaus in Germany.

== Public Art Commissions ==
Hauben was commissioned by the Metropolitan Transportation Authority of NYC to create the artwork for the Freeman Street (IRT White Plains Road Line) on the 2 & 5 elevated train line in the Bronx. The work consists of six faceted glass panels, created with inch-thick colored glass pieces that are held together with epoxy, all of which depict Bronx street scenes.

In 2007 the Americans for the Arts organization recognized Hauben's Freeman Street Station artwork (collectively titled "The El") as one of the top 40 works of public art in the nation.

In 2008 Hauben was selected to create all the artwork for the new North Instructional Building and Library of Bronx Community College. Ground was broken for the 98,000-square-foot (9,100 m^{2}) building in October 2008, with a completion date set for 2011. It was designed by Robert A. M. Stern Architects, and complements the original Stanford White plan for the campus. The artwork for the building includes 22 paintings depicting scenes of the Bronx by Hauben.

== Awards and Commendations ==
- 1990 BRIO award
- 1995 BRIO award
- 2005 BRIO award

== Personal life ==
Hauben lives with his wife Judith Lane, a librettist and composer, in the Kingsbridge section of the Bronx.
