= Naomi Andrée Campbell =

Canadian visual artist

- Born: Montreal, Quebec, Canada
- Notable work: "Animal Tracks" in the West Farms Square–East Tremont Avenue subway station

Naomi Andrée Campbell is a Canadian visual artist and current resident in the International Studio & Curatorial Program. She has been an instructor of contemporary body in watercolor at the Art Students League of New York since 2007.

== Works ==
Campbell is best known for her 2004 work "Animal Tracks" in the West Farms Square–East Tremont Avenue subway station, commissioned for the MTA Arts & Design program. It consists of 450 square feet (42 m^{2}) in 13 faceted glass murals on the platform windscreens depicting images related to the Bronx Zoo, which is several blocks to the north.

Her work has been featured in art magazines and books including American Artist and Watercolor Artist magazines, Painting Lessons from the Art Students League of NY, Pure Color: The Best of Pastel and 100 Mid-Atlantic Artists. Her work is in the permanent collections of the City of New York, the City of Irving, Texas, the City of Geochang, Korea. the Trenton City Museum, New Jersey and the Art Students League of New York.
