= West Farms Square–East Tremont Avenue station =

New York City Subway station in the Bronx

West Farms Square– East Tremont Avenue
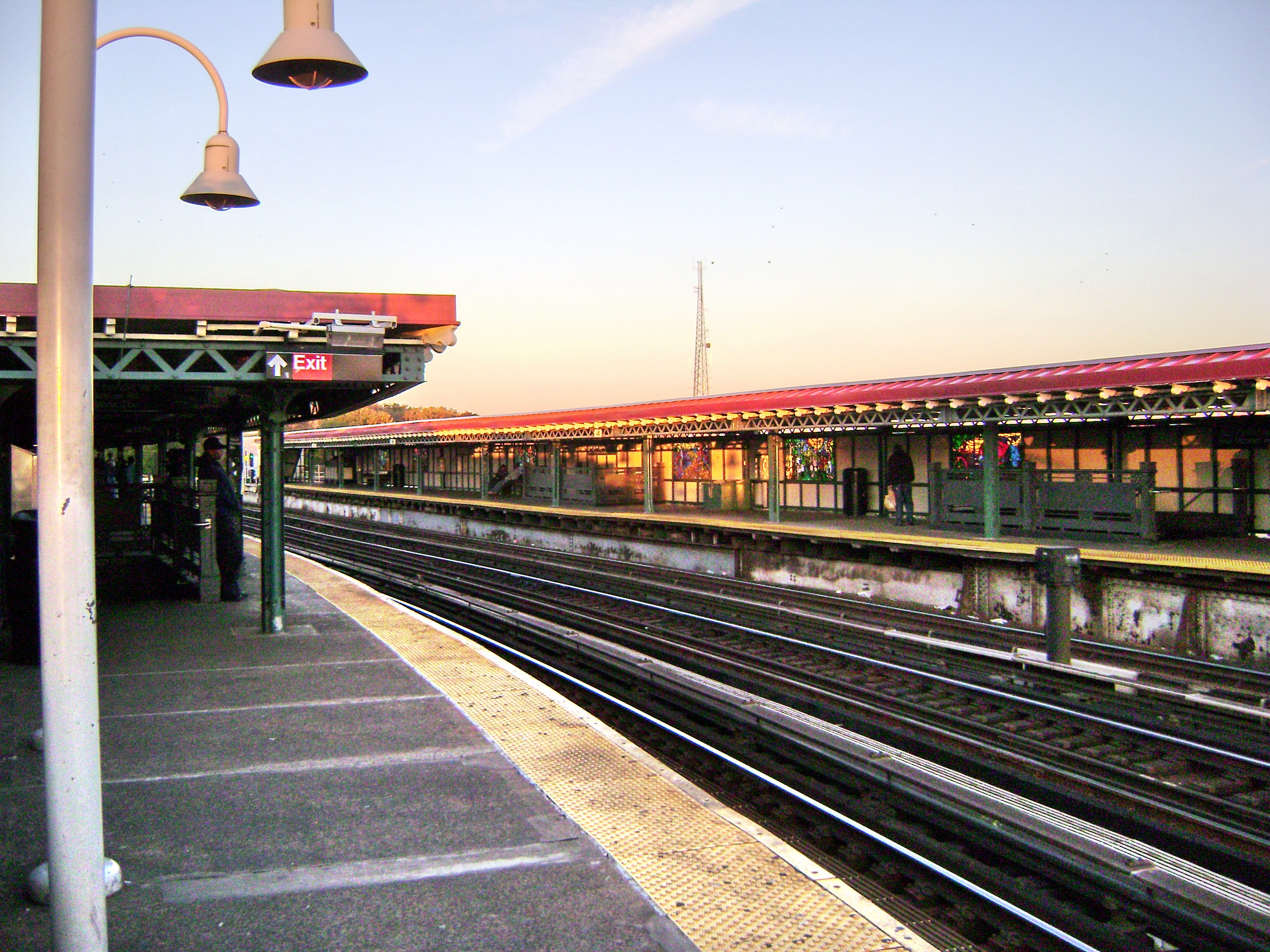
- View from the southbound platform, looking north

Station statistics
- Address: East Tremont Avenue & Boston Road; Bronx, New York
- Borough: The Bronx
- Locale: West Farms
- Coordinates: 40.84°N 73.88°W
- Division: A (IRT)
- Line: IRT White Plains Road Line
- Services: 2 (all times); 5 (all times except rush hours in the peak direction and late nights)
- Transit: NYCT Bus: Bx9, Bx21, Bx40, Bx42, Bx36, Q44 SBS
- Structure: Elevated
- Platforms: 2 side platforms
- Tracks: 3

Other information
- Opened: November 26, 1904; 121 years ago
- Accessible: No; planned
- Former/other names: 177th Street

Traffic
- 2025: 1,206,227 ▲23.6%
- Rank: 276 out of 423
Services
Preceding station	New York City Subway	Following station
East 180th Street 2 5 services split	Local	174th Street 2 5 toward Flatbush Avenue–Brooklyn College
Non-revenue services and lines
Preceding station	New York City Subway	Following station
180th Street–Bronx Park demolished	no service	
Location
Location within New York City Subway
Location within New York City
Location within New York
Track layout
Street map
Station service legend
Symbol	Description
Stops all times	Stops all times
Stops all times except rush hours in the peak direction	Stops all times except rush hours in the peak direction

The West Farms Square–East Tremont Avenue station (formerly the 177th Street station) is a local station on the IRT White Plains Road Line of the New York City Subway. Located at the intersection of East Tremont Avenue and Boston Road in the West Farms neighborhood of the Bronx, it is served by the 2 train at all times, and the 5 train at all times except late nights and rush hours in the peak direction. Departing passengers are asked to watch the gap upon leaving the train at this station.

== History ==
The initial segment of the IRT White Plains Road Line opened on November 26, 1904, between 180th Street–Bronx Park and Jackson Avenue. Initially, trains on the line were served by elevated trains from the IRT Second Avenue Line and the IRT Third Avenue Line. Once the connection to the IRT Lenox Avenue Line opened on July 10, 1905, trains from the newly opened IRT subway ran via the line.

In Fiscal Year 1909, the installation of an escalator at the station was authorized.

To address overcrowding, in 1909, the New York Public Service Commission proposed lengthening the platforms at stations along the original IRT subway. As part of a modification to the IRT's construction contracts made on January 18, 1910, the company was to lengthen station platforms to accommodate ten-car express and six-car local trains. In addition to $1.5 million (equivalent to $51.8 million in 2025) spent on platform lengthening, $500,000 (equivalent to $17.3 million in 2025) was spent on building additional entrances and exits. It was anticipated that these improvements would increase capacity by 25 percent. The northbound platform at the 177th Street station was extended 150 feet (46 m) to the rear, while the southbound platform was not lengthened. On January 23, 1911, ten-car express trains began running on the White Plains Road Line.

The New York State Transit Commission announced plans to extend the southbound platforms at seven stations on the line from Jackson Avenue to 177th Street to accommodate ten-car trains for $81,900 on August 8, 1934. The platform at 177th Street would be lengthened from 351 feet (107 m) to 493 feet (150 m).

The city government took over the IRT's operations on June 12, 1940. The Bergen Avenue cutoff, which allowed Third Avenue trains to access the White Plains Road Line, was abandoned on November 5, 1946, as part of the gradual curtailment of elevated service on the IRT Third Avenue Line. On June 13, 1949, the platform extensions at this station, as well as those on White Plains Road Line stations south to Jackson Avenue, opened. The platforms were lengthened to 514 feet (157 m) to allow full ten-car express trains to open their doors. Previously the stations could only accommodate six-car local trains.

On November 1, 1951, a contract for the construction of a mezzanine was awarded to Amdor Structures Incorporated. The mezzanine connected the subway station with a new escalator in Boston Road near the Bronx Zoo.

As part of its 2025–2029 Capital Program, the MTA has proposed making the station wheelchair-accessible in compliance with the Americans with Disabilities Act of 1990.

== Station layout ==
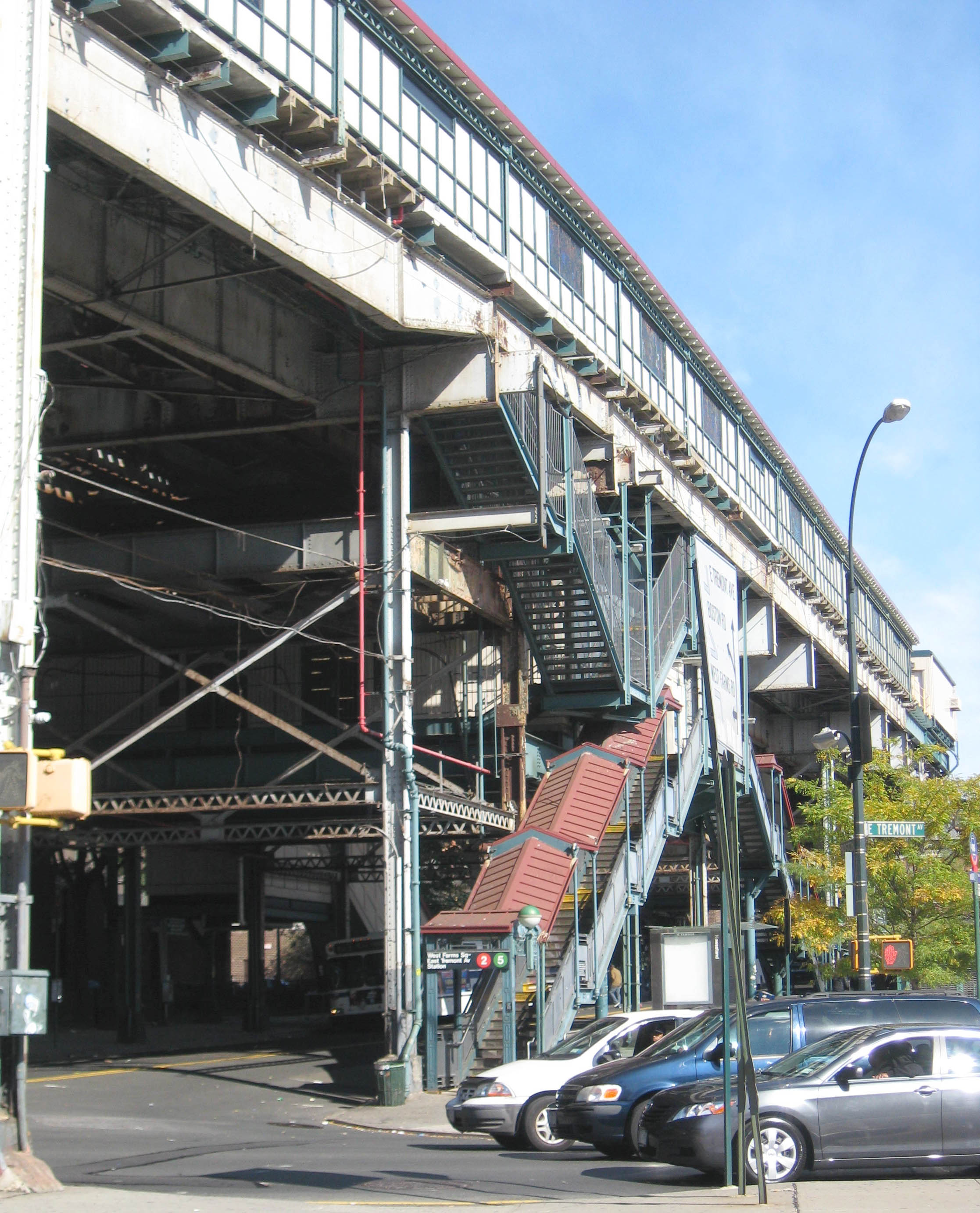
East Tremont Avenue exit

This elevated station, situated on a high curve, one of the highest elevations on the line, has three tracks and two side platforms. The center track is used by the 5 train during rush hours in peak direction. The northbound platform is longer than the southbound one and can fit about 12 cars.

Both platforms have beige windscreens with green frames and outlines and green canopies with red roofs on their northern half and gray, waist-high, steel fences with lampposts at regular intervals on their southern half. The station name signs are in the standard black name plate in white lettering.

The 2004 artwork here is called Animal Tracks by Naomi Andrée Campbell. It consists of 450 square feet (42 m^{2}) in 13 faceted glass murals on the platform windscreens depicting images related to the Bronx Zoo, which is several blocks to the north.

Just north of the station are the abandoned trackways to 180th Street–Bronx Park, the original terminal of the White Plains Road Line.

=== Exits ===
This station has two elevated station houses below the platforms and tracks. The full-time one is at the center. Two staircases from each platform go down to a crossunder, where doors lead to a waiting area. Outside the turnstile bank that provides access to and from the station, there is a token booth, two staircases going down to the northeast corner of East Tremont Avenue and Boston Road, and one staircase and one enclosed escalator going down to the northwest corner. The station's other station house at the north end is unstaffed, containing one staircase from the northwest corner of East 178th Street and Boston Road, a set of High Entry-Exit Turnstiles, and two staircases to each platform.
