= Crotona Park East, Bronx =

Neighborhood in New York City

Crotona Park East
- Neighborhood of the Bronx
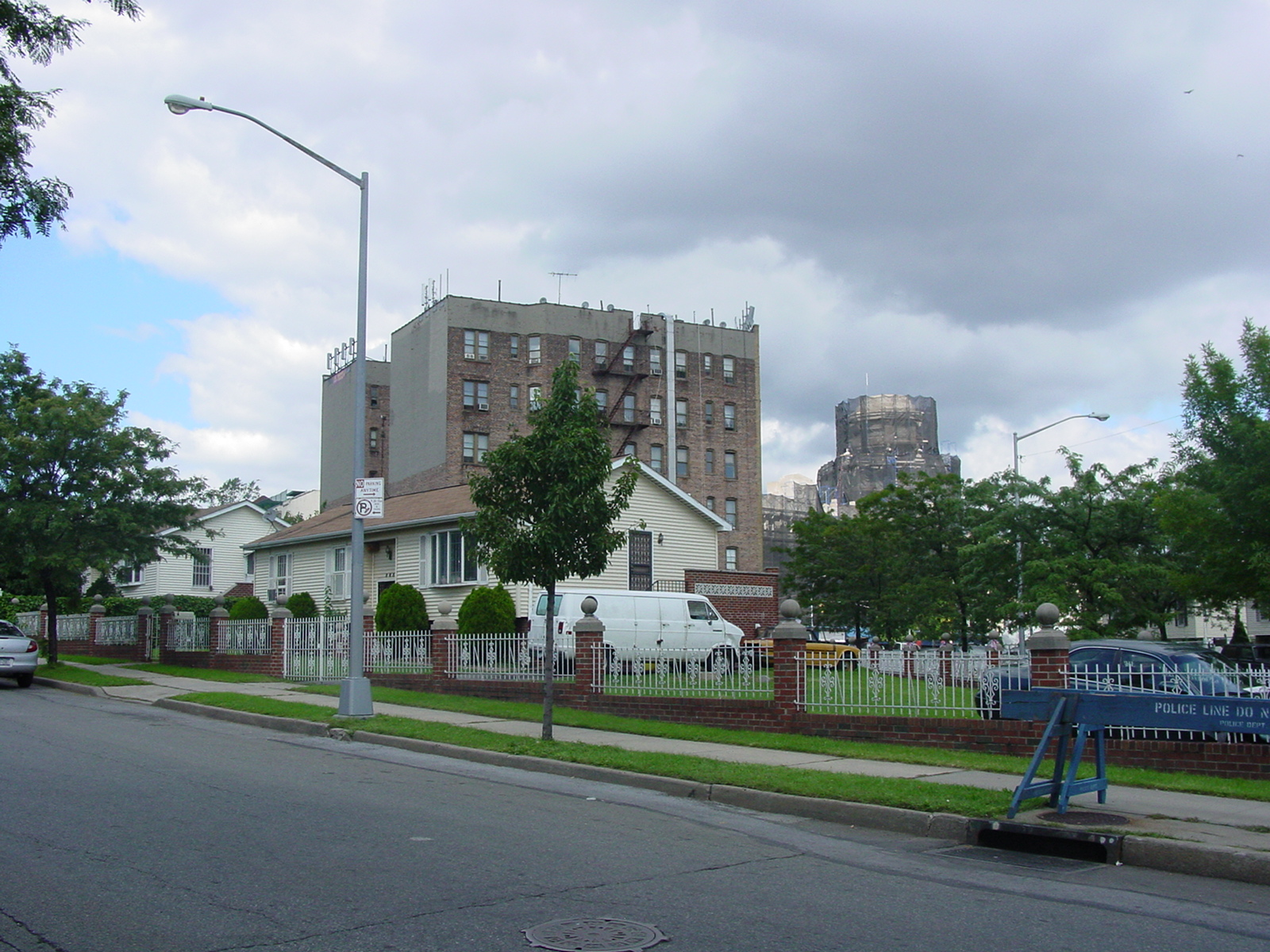
- Ranch style homes along Charlotte Street
- Interactive map of Crotona Park East
- Coordinates: 40.839°N 73.895°W
- Country: United States
- State: New York
- City: New York City
- Borough: Bronx
- Community District: Bronx 3

Area
  - Total: 0.491 sq mi (1.27 km^{2})

Population (2011)
  - Total: 37,075
  - Density: 75,500/sq mi (29,200/km^{2})

Economics
  - Median income: $26,509

Ethnicity
  - Hispanic: 65.3%
  - Black: 32%
  - White: 0.9%
  - Asian: 0.6%
  - Others: 1.2%
- ZIP Codes: 10459, 10460
- Area code: 718, 347, 929, and 917

Crotona Park East, also known as Crotona or East Morrisania, is a residential neighborhood geographically located in the southwest Bronx in New York City. Crotona Park East is considered part of the South Bronx. Its boundaries, starting from the north and moving clockwise are the Cross-Bronx Expressway to the north, the Bronx River to the east, East 167th Street to the south, and Crotona/Prospect Avenues to the west. Southern Boulevard is the primary thoroughfare through the area. The neighborhood is adjacent to, but distinct from, the nearby park named Crotona Park.

The neighborhood is part of Bronx Community Board 3, and its ZIP Codes include 10459 and 10460. The area is patrolled by the NYPD's 42nd Precinct. NYCHA property in the area is patrolled by P.S.A. 7 at 737 Melrose Avenue in the Melrose section of the Bronx.

== History ==
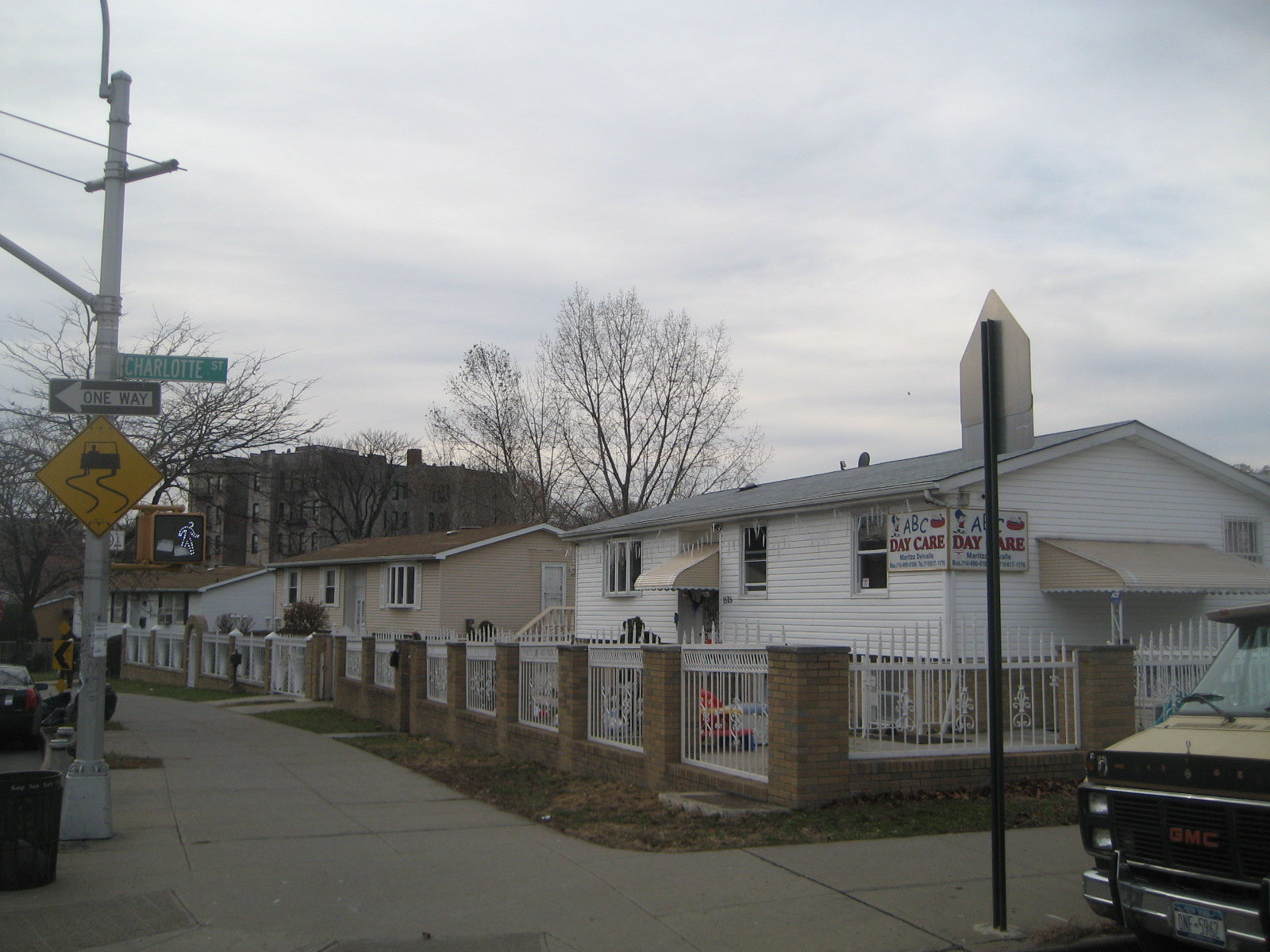
Ranch style homes along Charlotte Street, from Boston Road.

From 1670, the land of the neighborhood was the estate of the Morris family in Westchester County.

In the 1970s, Crotona Park East and many other low income sections of the New York City were being ravaged by arson. By 1980, the South Bronx had become a national symbol of urban decay; Charlotte Street, a street in the neighborhood's heart, had decayed the worst. The area was filled with many burned-out tenement buildings, empty lots, and arsons happening nearly every day, as more than 66% of residents left the area. On October 5, 1977, then-President Jimmy Carter visited Charlotte Street, declaring the South Bronx to be the worst neighborhood in the United States. A year later, the city still had not renovated Charlotte Street. The urban decay of Charlotte Street was used as one of the symbolic locations for the 1981 film Wolfen.

Genevieve Brooks moved to the neighborhood in the 1960s before the area's decline. She became an influential figure in revitalizing the neighborhood by forming the Mid-Bronx Desperadoes, coordinating volunteering efforts, and organizing beautification activities. She partnered with Ed Longe, an urban planner, to rebuild Charlotte Street, starting with 90 new homes.

The Mid-Bronx Desperadoes, along with other community groups such as Banana Kelly CIA Inc. and the SEBCO (South East Bronx Community Organization) were helping to maintain existing buildings which were structurally intact after fires. They played a pivotal role in the construction of subsidized multi-family homes and apartment buildings in most of Crotona Park East. The subsidized homes built along Charlotte Street during the late 1980s in Crotona Park East, which originally cost $50,000 were the first and still are the only ranch style homes in the South Bronx today; these homes are now worth over $500,000. This type of housing was selected due to its desirable traits. Today they are home to many African American and Puerto Rican families. The funding for these homes was provided in part by former Assemblyman Louis Niñé, in whose honor Wilkins Avenue was renamed "Louis Niñé Boulevard", following his death in 1983.

== Demographics ==
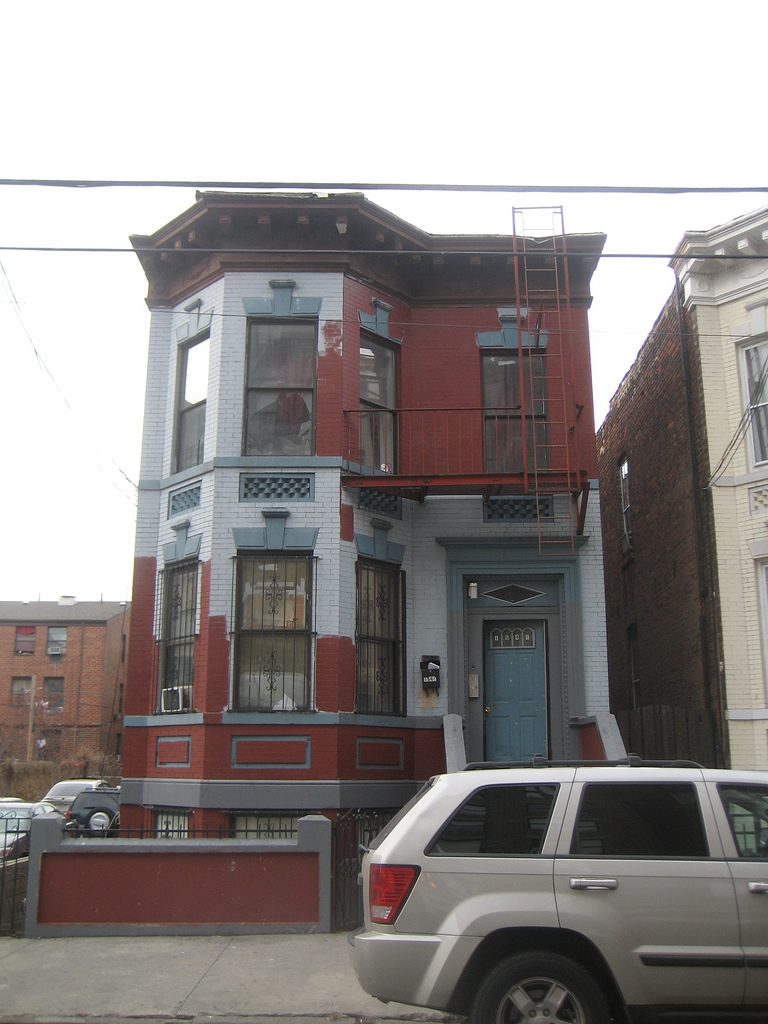
Older multifamily home in Crotona Park East.

Crotona Park East is a low-income neighborhood that predominantly consists of Latin Americans and African Americans. The vast majority of households, 93.5% of all housing, are renter-occupied. Almost half of the population lives below the federal poverty line.

Based on data from the 2010 United States census, the population of Crotona Park East was 20,277, a change of 2,205 (10.9%) from the 18,072 counted in 2000. Covering an area of 378.51 acres (153.18 ha), the neighborhood had a population density of 53.6 inhabitants per acre (34,300/sq mi; 13,200/km^{2}).

The racial makeup of the neighborhood was 0.9% (179) White, 32% (6,493) African American, 0.3% (65) Native American, 0.6% (123) Asian, 0% (3) Pacific Islander, 0.2% (39) from other races, and 0.7% (138) from two or more races. Hispanic or Latino of any race were 65.3% (13,237) of the population.

The entirety of Community District 3, which comprises Crotona Park East and Morrisania, had 91,601 inhabitants as of NYC Health's 2018 Community Health Profile, with an average life expectancy of 76.2 years. This is lower than the median life expectancy of 81.2 for all New York City neighborhoods. Most inhabitants are youth and middle-aged adults: 29% are between the ages of between 0–17, 29% between 25 and 44, and 21% between 45 and 64. The ratio of college-aged and elderly residents was lower, at 12% and 9% respectively.

As of 2017, the median household income in Community Districts 3 and 6, including Tremont and Belmont, was $25,972. In 2018, an estimated 31% of Crotona Park East and Morrisania residents lived in poverty, compared to 25% in all of the Bronx and 20% in all of New York City. One in six residents (16%) were unemployed, compared to 13% in the Bronx and 9% in New York City. Rent burden, or the percentage of residents who have difficulty paying their rent, is 60% in Crotona Park East and Morrisania, compared to the boroughwide and citywide rates of 58% and 51% respectively. Based on this calculation, as of 2018, Crotona Park East and Morrisania are gentrifying.

== Land use and terrain ==
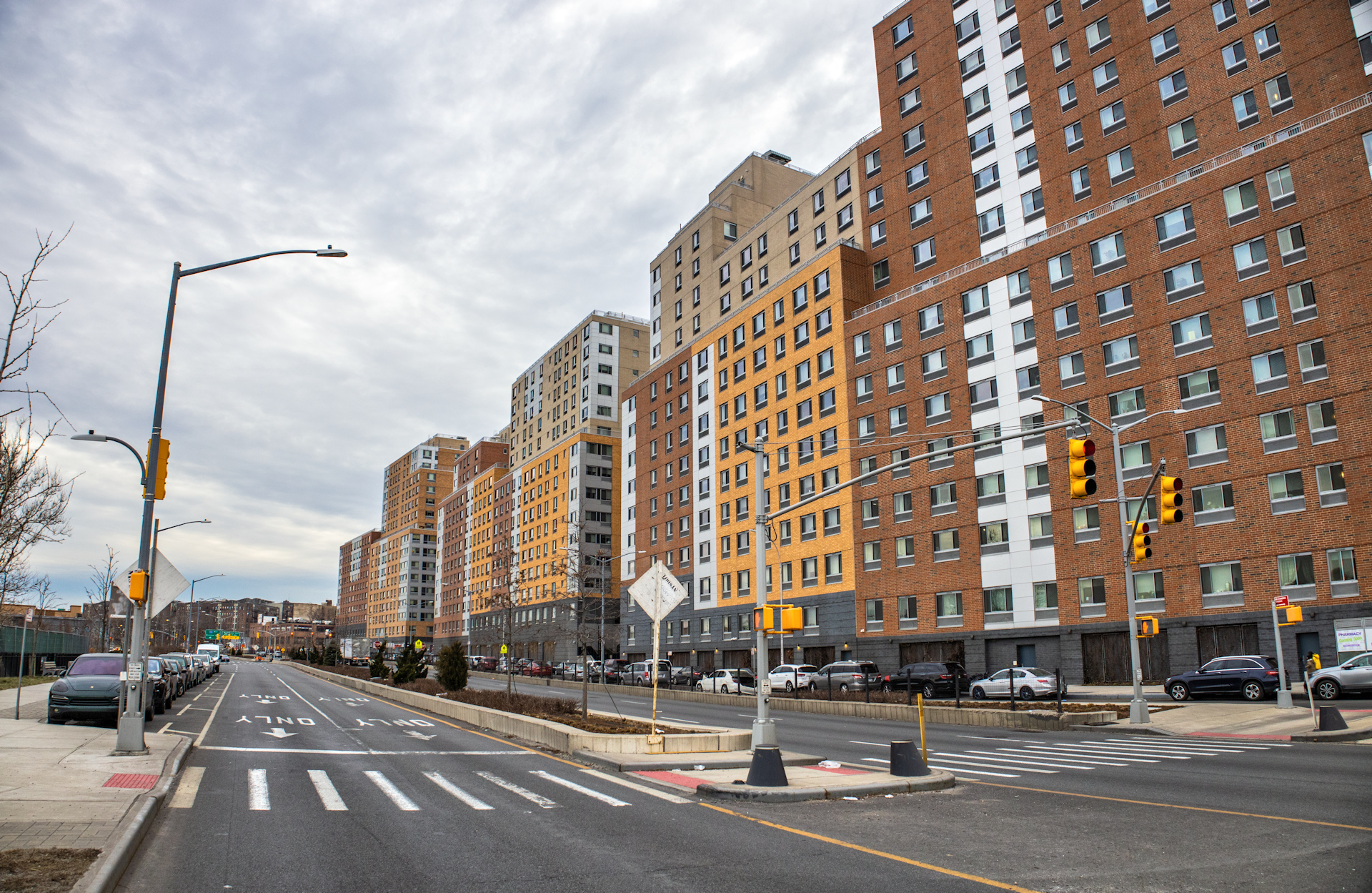
Newly built apartment buildings along Sheridan Blvd (NY-895) / West Farms Road in Crotona Park East.

Crotona Park East is dominated by public housing projects and newly constructed subsidized attached multi-unit townhouses and apartment buildings, although tenement buildings, older multi-unit homes, and vacant lots are also present. Most of the original housing stock was structurally damaged by arson and were eventually razed by the city. The total land area is less than a square mile. The terrain is somewhat hilly.

=== Low-income public housing projects ===
There are eight NYCHA properties located in Crotona Park East.

1. Bryant Avenue-East 174th Street; one 6-story building
2. East 173rd Street-Vyse Avenue; seven buildings, 3 stories tall
3. Hoe Avenue-East 173rd Street; one 6-story building
4. Murphy Houses; two 20-story buildings
5. Prospect Avenue M.H.O.P. (Multi Family Homeownership Program); one rehabilitated 5-story tenement building
6. West Farms Square Rehab; four rehabilitated tenement buildings, 6 stories tall
7. West Farms Square (Conventional); one 5-story rehabilitated tenement building
8. West Farms Square M.H.O.P. (Multi Family Homeownership Program); two rehabilitated tenement buildings, 5 and 6 stories tall

=== Parks ===
Crotona Park East is home to Crotona Park and Starlight Park (formally Exhibition Park), built on land once owned by William Astor and the location of an amusement park for through the 1940s.

== Police and crime ==
Crotona Park East and Morrisania are patrolled by the 42nd Precinct of the NYPD, located at 830 Washington Avenue. The 42nd Precinct ranked 45th safest out of 69 patrol areas for per-capita crime in 2010. As of 2018, with a non-fatal assault rate of 161 per 100,000 people, Crotona Park East and Morrisania's rate of violent crimes per capita is greater than that of the city as a whole. The incarceration rate of 1,243 per 100,000 people is higher than that of the city as a whole.

The 42nd Precinct has a lower crime rate than in the 1990s, with crimes across all categories having decreased by 63.3% between 1990 and 2022. The precinct reported 7 murders, 44 rapes, 437 robberies, 672 felony assaults, 314 burglaries, 515 grand larcenies, and 293 grand larcenies auto in 2022.

== Fire safety ==
Crotona Park East contains a New York City Fire Department (FDNY) fire station, Engine Co. 82/Ladder Co. 31, at 1213 Intervale Avenue.

== Health ==
As of 2018, preterm births and births to teenage mothers are more common in Crotona Park East and Morrisania than in other places citywide. In Crotona Park East and Morrisania, there were 107 preterm births per 1,000 live births (compared to 87 per 1,000 citywide), and 35.6 births to teenage mothers per 1,000 live births (compared to 19.3 per 1,000 citywide). Crotona Park East and Morrisania has a relatively average population of residents who are uninsured. In 2018, this population of uninsured residents was estimated to be 12%, equal to the citywide rate of 12%.

The concentration of fine particulate matter, the deadliest type of air pollutant, in Crotona Park East and Morrisania is 0.0078 milligrams per cubic metre (7.8×10^{−9} oz/ft^{3}), more than the city average. Sixteen percent of Crotona Park East and Morrisania residents are smokers, which is higher than the city average of 14% of residents being smokers. In Crotona Park East and Morrisania, 36% of residents are obese, 22% are diabetic, and 32% have high blood pressure—compared to the citywide averages of 24%, 11%, and 28% respectively. In addition, 20% of children are obese, compared to the citywide average of 20%.

Eighty-one percent of residents eat some fruits and vegetables every day, which is less than the city's average of 87%. In 2018, 69% of residents described their health as "good", "very good", or "excellent", lower than the city's average of 78%. For every supermarket in Crotona Park East and Morrisania, there are 10 bodegas.

The nearest hospitals are NYC Health + Hospitals/Lincoln in Melrose and Bronx-Lebanon Hospital Center in Claremont.

== Post office and ZIP Codes ==
Crotona Park East is covered by the ZIP Codes 10459 south of Jennings Street and 10460 north of Jennings Street. The United States Postal Service operates the Boulevard Station post office at 1132 Southern Boulevard.

== Education ==
Crotona Park East and Morrisania generally have a lower rate of college-educated residents than the rest of the city as of 2018. While 19% of residents age 25 and older have a college education or higher, 36% have less than a high school education and 45% are high school graduates or have some college education. By contrast, 26% of Bronx residents and 43% of city residents have a college education or higher. The percentage of Crotona Park East and Morrisania students excelling in math rose from 19% in 2000 to 41% in 2011, and reading achievement increased from 28% to 32% during the same time period.

Crotona Park East and Morrisania's rate of elementary school student absenteeism is more than the rest of New York City. In Crotona Park East and Morrisania, 34% of elementary school students missed twenty or more days per school year, higher than the citywide average of 20%. Additionally, 63% of high school students in Crotona Park East and Morrisania graduate on time, lower than the citywide average of 75%.

=== Schools ===
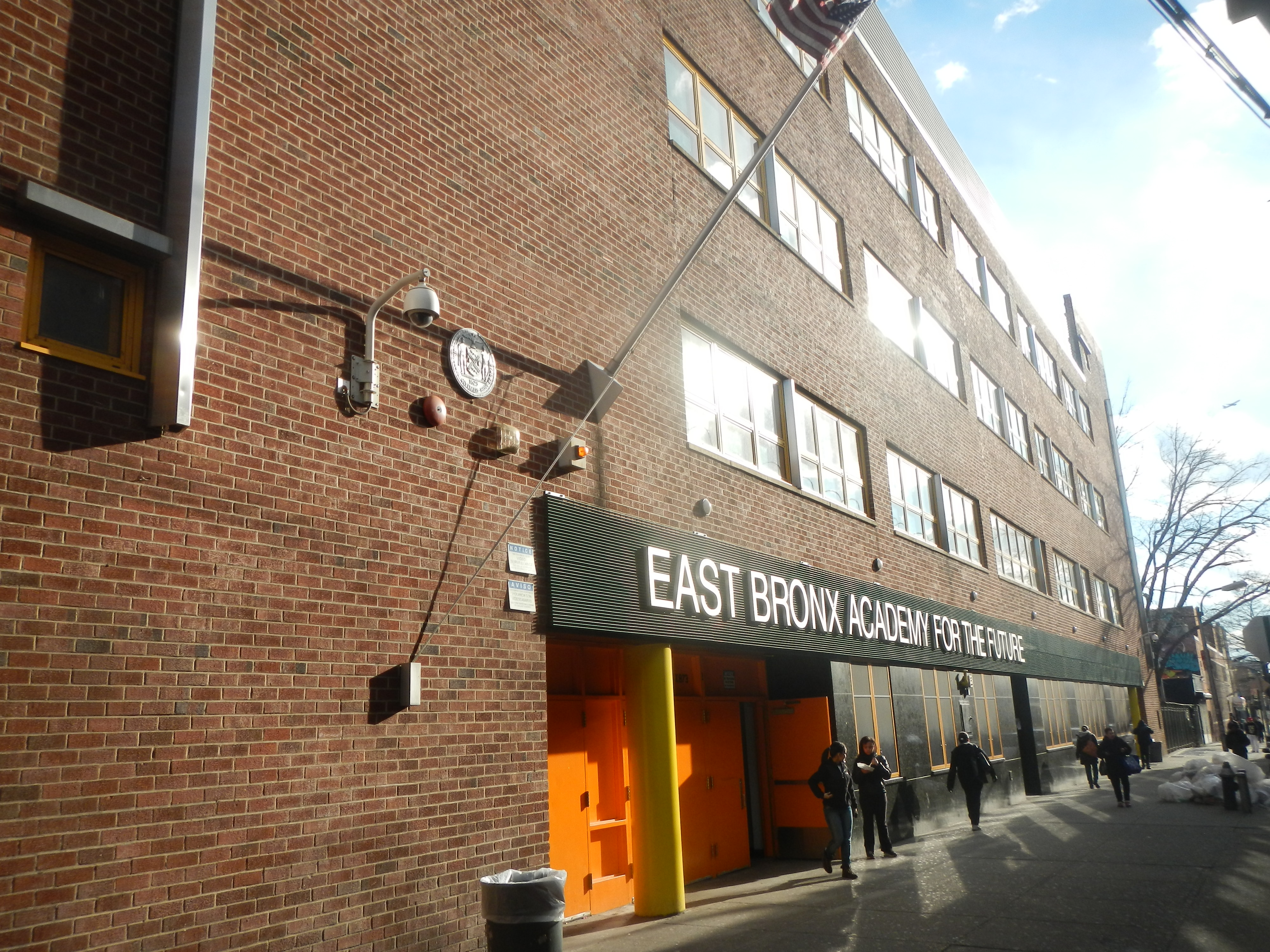
East Bronx Academy

The New York City Department of Education operates public schools. Schools include:

- PS 50: Clara Barton (East 172nd Street and Vyse Avenue)
- PS 61/MS 190: Francisco Oller (Charlotte Street and Crotona Park East)
- PS 66: Daniel Boone (Jennings Street and Boone Avenue)
- PS 134: George Frederic Bristow (Freeman and Bristow Streets)
- IS 98: Herman Ridder (East 173rd Street and Boston Road)
- PS 271: East Bronx Academy for the Future

The Roman Catholic Archdiocese of New York operates Catholic schools in the Bronx. St. Martin of Tours School was in Crotona. After it opened in 1925, its student body was mostly Irish American and Italian American, and most parents were in the working class fields. African-American and Latino families began entering the area in the 1960s. In its heyday it had over 1,000 students. Throughout the school's life, many of its students originated from immigrant families. The white flight of the 1970s and the increasingly low socioeconomic profile of the neighborhood impacted the school. In 2011 it had nine lay teachers and 104 students. It closed that year.

=== Library ===
The New York Public Library operates the Morrisania branch at 610 East 169th Street. The branch, a Carnegie library, opened in 1908 and was designed by Babb, Cook & Willard.

== Transportation ==
The following MTA Regional Bus Operations bus routes serve Crotona Park East:

- Bx11: to Parkchester station (6 and <6> trains) or George Washington Bridge Bus Terminal (via 170th Street, Claremont Parkway, 174th Street)
- Bx17: to Fordham Plaza Bus Terminal or Port Morris (via Prospect–Crotona Avenues)
- Bx19: to New York Botanical Garden or Riverbank State Park (via 149th Street–Southern Boulevard)
- Bx21: to Westchester Square station or Third Avenue–138th Street station (via Boston Road–Morris Park Avenue)
- Bx27: to Clason Point (via Rosedale Avenue)
- Bx35: to West Farms Road (Crotona Park East) or George Washington Bridge Bus Terminal (via 167th Street)

The following New York City Subway stations serve Crotona Park East:

- 174th Street (2 and 5 trains)
- Freeman Street (2 and 5 trains)
