= 180th Street–Bronx Park station =

New York City Subway station in the Bronx from 1904 to 1952

180 Street–Bronx Park
- Former New York City Subway station
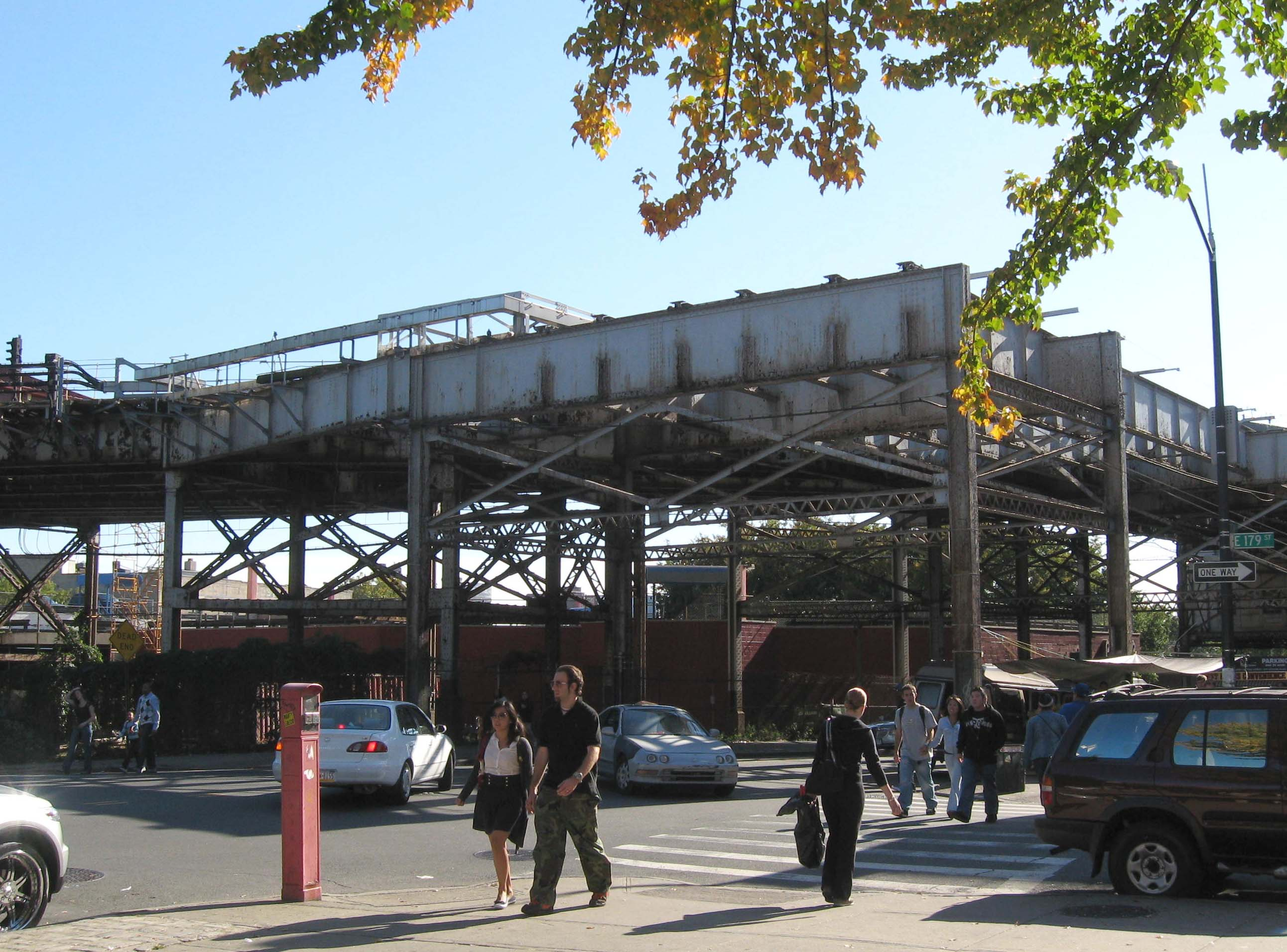
- Stub of demolished spur

Station statistics
- Borough: The Bronx
- Locale: West Farms
- Coordinates: 40°50′33.5″N 73°52′41″W
- Division: A (IRT)
- Line: IRT White Plains Road Line
- Services: None (demolished)
- Structure: Elevated
- Platforms: 1 island platform 2 side platforms Spanish solution
- Tracks: 2

Other information
- Opened: November 26, 1904; 120 years ago
- Closed: August 4, 1952; 73 years ago

Station succession
- Next north: (Terminal)
- Next south: West Farms Square–East Tremont Avenue (connection severed after demolition)
Location

Street map

The 180th Street–Bronx Park station was the former terminal station for the IRT White Plains Road Line of the New York City Subway, in the West Farms neighborhood of the Bronx.

== History ==
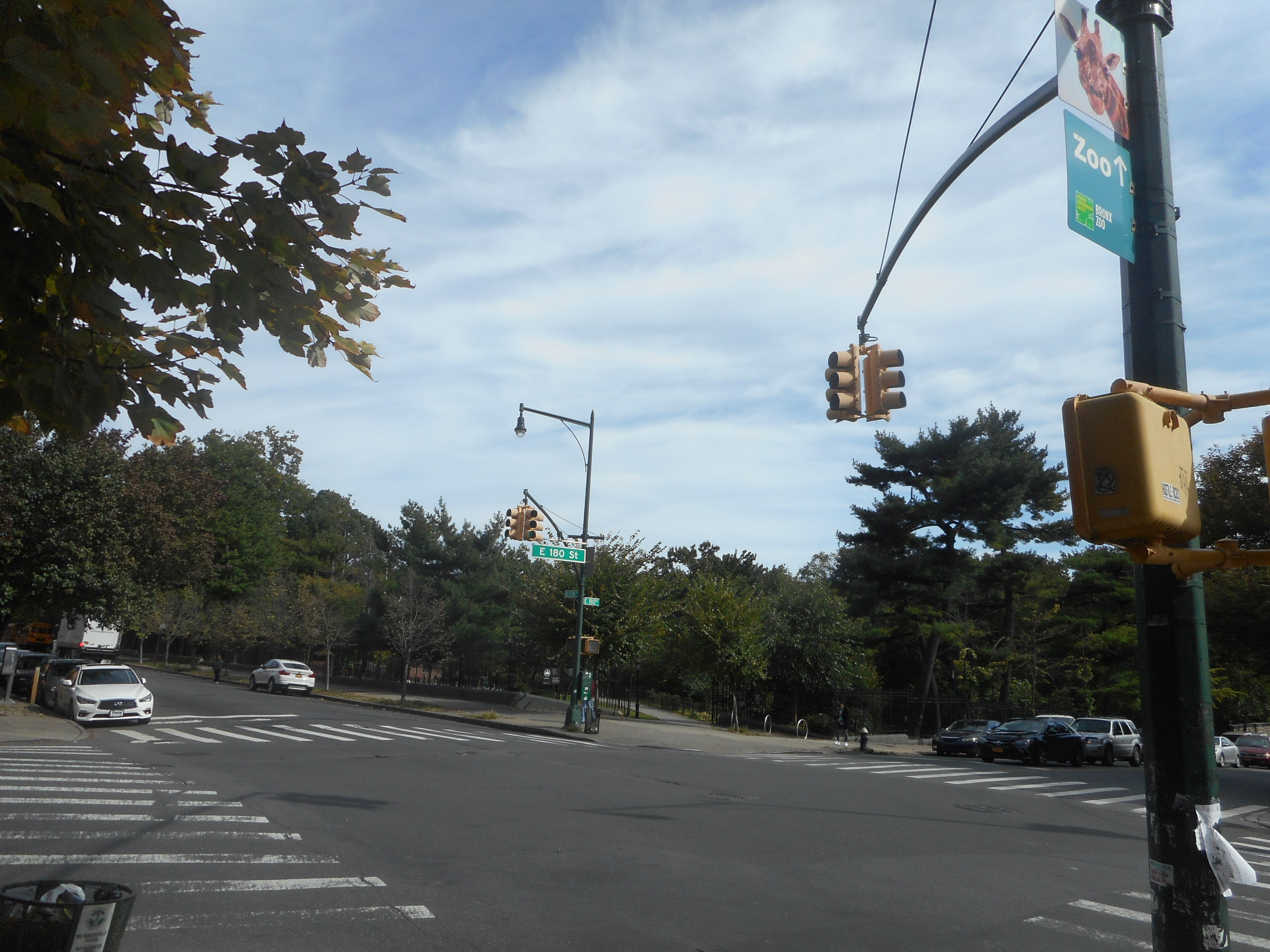
The current intersection where the station used to be.

The initial segment of the IRT White Plains Road Line opened on November 26, 1904, between 180th Street–Bronx Park and Jackson Avenue. Initially, trains on the line were served by elevated trains from the IRT Second Avenue Line and the IRT Third Avenue Line. Once the connection to the IRT Lenox Avenue Line opened on July 10, 1905, trains from the newly opened IRT subway ran via the line.

The line was originally intended to extend farther north but was changed into a terminal during construction due to protests stating that the trains running over Bronx Park would be bad for animals in the Bronx Zoo. The line's extension is the reason for the S-curve north of the West Farms Square–East Tremont Avenue station. After the line's extension to 238th Street in 1917, and then Wakefield–241st Street in 1920, the Bronx Park spur was considered redundant.

On March 1, 1951, the Board of Transportation announced a plan to implement express service along the White Plains Road Line between 241st Street and Third Avenue–149th Street using the middle third track. New signaling, including the installation of block signals, was to be installed on the local tracks, in addition to the installation of signals on the express track at the cost of $3.5 million. In addition, it was announced that a flyover to the Dyre Avenue Line would be built, allowing for through-service, and eliminating the need to transfer at East 180th Street. The final key element to the improvement plan was the elimination of the at-grade junction north of the West Farms Square station, which was a major bottleneck, by closing the spur to 180th Street–Bronx Park. To make up for the loss of service, an escalator would be added at the West Farms Square station at 178th Street and Boston Road. The station was closed and abandoned on August 4, 1952. The station and associated elevated structure were later torn down.

== Station layout ==
The station used a Spanish solution layout. It had two tracks, an island platform and two side platforms. The tracks ended at bumper blocks at the north end of the platforms. At the time of the station's closure, Seventh Avenue Express trains served the terminal, while through service to 241st Street were served by Lexington Avenue Express trains.
