= Jackson Avenue station (IRT White Plains Road Line) =

New York City Subway station in the Bronx

Jackson Avenue
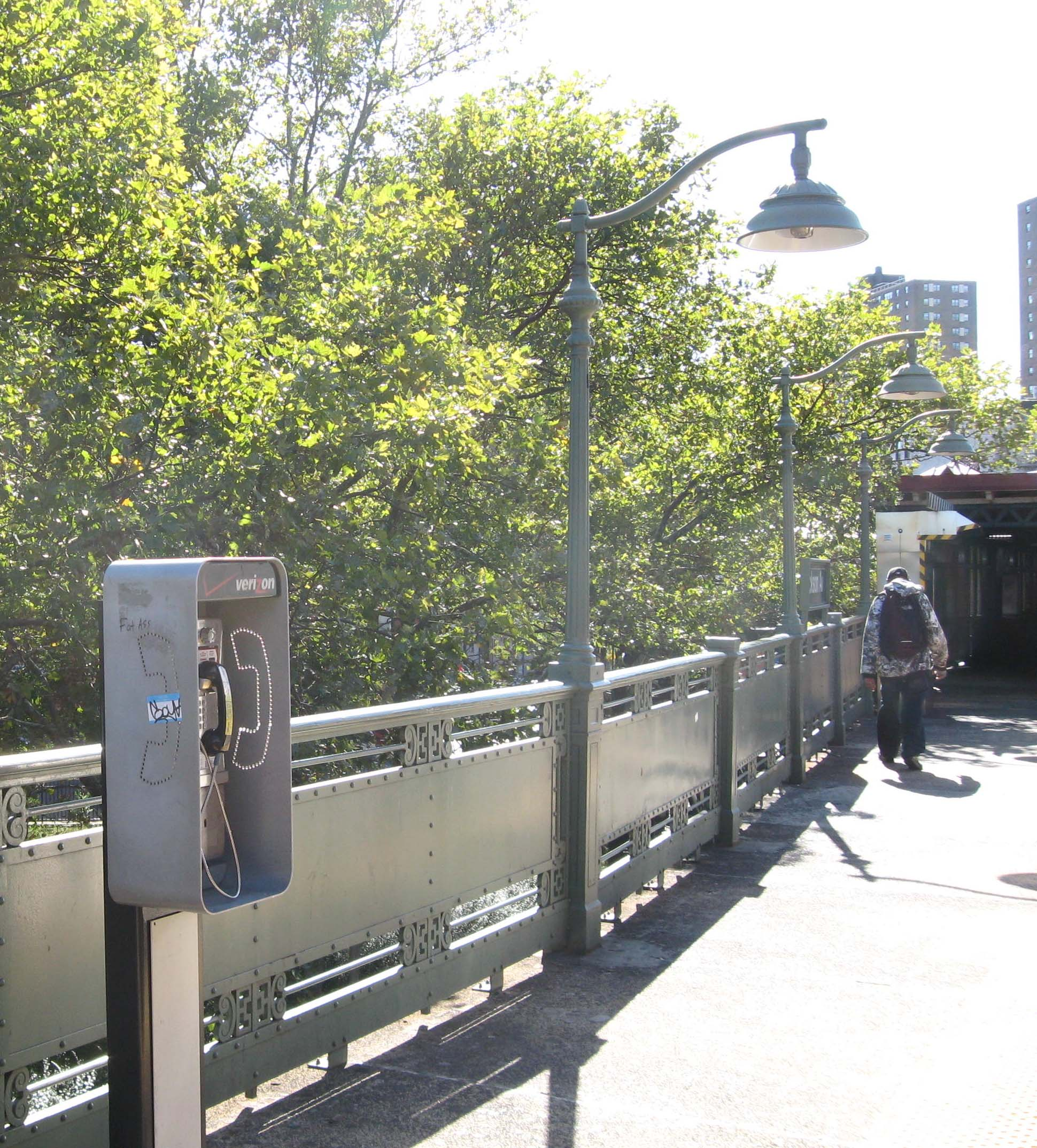
- Northbound platform in October 2008

Station statistics
- Address: Jackson Avenue & Westchester Avenue; Bronx, New York
- Borough: The Bronx
- Locale: Longwood, Melrose
- Coordinates: 40°48′59″N 73°54′29″W
- Division: A (IRT)
- Line: IRT White Plains Road Line
- Services: 2 (all times); 5 (all times except rush hours in the peak direction and late nights)
- Transit: NYCT Bus: Bx4
- Structure: Elevated
- Platforms: 2 side platforms
- Tracks: 3

Other information
- Opened: November 26, 1904; 121 years ago (3rd Ave. Line; Bergen Avenue bypass); July 10, 1905; 121 years ago (White Plains Rd. Line)

Traffic
- 2025: 1,092,549 ▲18.3%
- Rank: 294 out of 423
Services
Preceding station	New York City Subway	Following station
Prospect Avenue 2 5 via East 180th Street	Local	Third Avenue–149th Street 2 5 toward Flatbush Avenue–Brooklyn College
Non-revenue services and lines
Preceding station	New York City Subway	Following station
	no service	143rd Street 3rd Ave; demolished
Location
Location within New York City Subway
Location within New York City
Location within New York
Track layout
Street map
Station service legend
Symbol	Description
Stops all times except rush hours in the peak direction	Stops all times except rush hours in the peak direction
Stops all times	Stops all times
- Jackson Avenue Subway Station (IRT)
- U.S. National Register of Historic Places
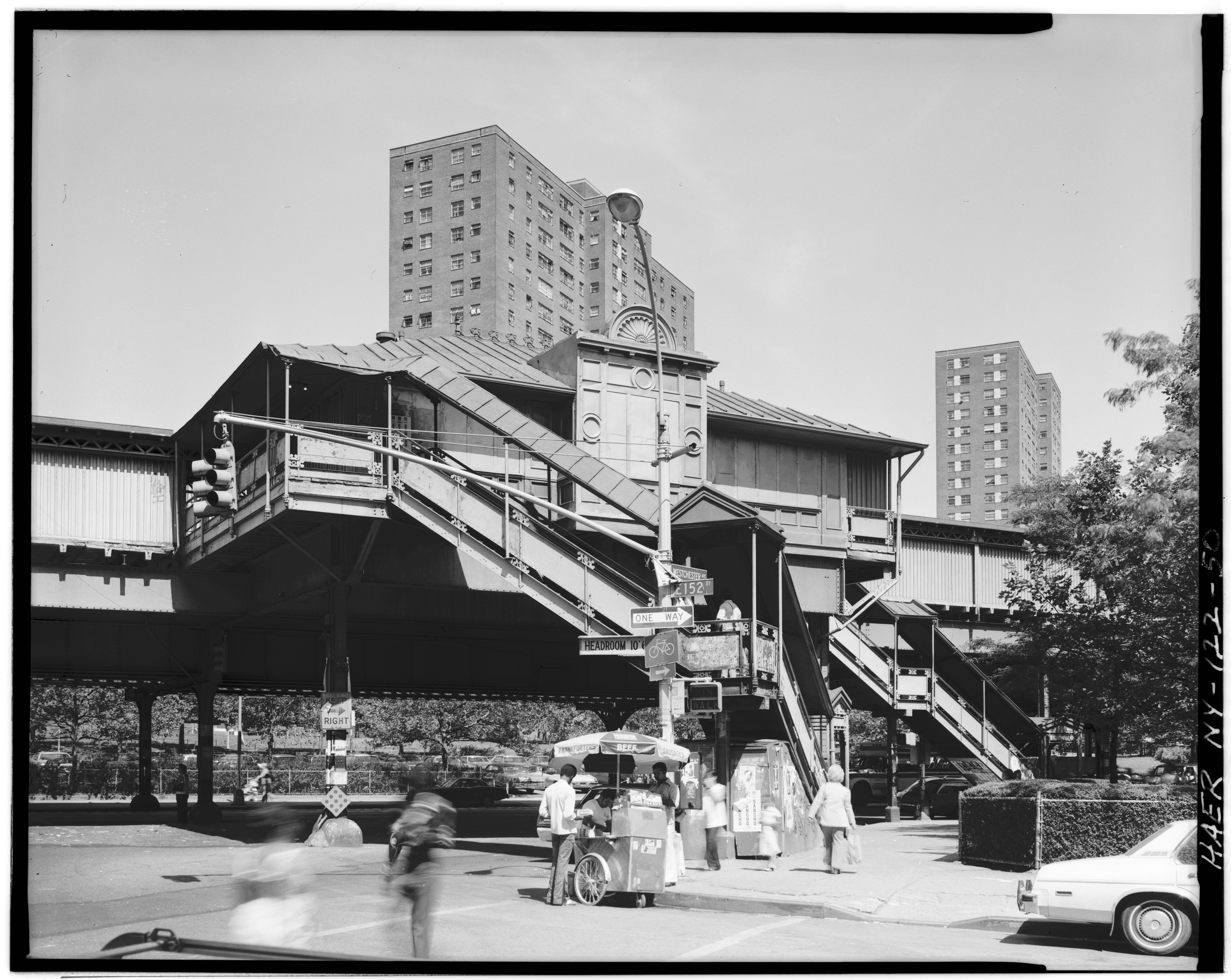
- HABS image of the northbound station house and staircase at 152nd Street
- MPS: New York City Subway System MPS
- NRHP reference No.: 04001025
- Added to NRHP: September 17, 2004

The Jackson Avenue station is a local station on the IRT White Plains Road Line of the New York City Subway. Located at the intersection of Jackson and Westchester Avenues in the Longwood and Melrose neighborhoods of the Bronx, it is served by the 2 train at all times, and the 5 train at all times except late nights and rush hours in the peak direction.

The Jackson Avenue station opened on November 26, 1904, as part of the initial segment of the IRT White Plains Road Line. The station was first served by elevated trains from the IRT Second Avenue Line and the IRT Third Avenue Line, and direct service from the IRT Lenox Avenue Line started in 1905. The Bergen Avenue cutoff, which carried trains between Jackson Avenue and the Third Avenue Line's express tracks, was in operation from 1917 to 1946. The platforms were extended in 1949, and the northbound fare control area was replaced after a 1977 fire. The station has been listed on the National Register of Historic Places since 2004.

== History ==
=== Early history ===
The first contract for the construction of a subway in New York, Contract 1, was executed on February 21, 1900, between the Board of Rapid Transit Railroad Commissioners and the Rapid Transit Construction Company, organized by John B. McDonald and funded by August Belmont, for the construction of the subway and a 50-year operating lease from the opening of the line. Contract 1 called for the construction of a line from City Hall north to Kingsbridge and a branch under Lenox Avenue and to Bronx Park.

The initial segment of the IRT White Plains Road Line opened on November 26, 1904, between East 180th Street and this station. Initially, trains on the line were served by elevated trains from the IRT Second Avenue Line and the IRT Third Avenue Line, with a connection running from the Third Avenue local tracks at Third Avenue and 149th Street to Westchester Avenue and Eagle Avenue. Once the connection to the IRT Lenox Avenue Line opened on July 10, 1905, trains from the newly opened IRT subway ran via the line. Elevated service via this connection was resumed on October 1, 1907, when Second Avenue local trains were extended to Freeman Street during rush hours.

To address overcrowding, in 1909, the New York Public Service Commission proposed lengthening the platforms at stations along the original IRT subway. As part of a modification to the IRT's construction contracts made on January 18, 1910, the company was to lengthen station platforms to accommodate ten-car express and six-car local trains. In addition to $1.5 million (equivalent to $51.8 million in 2025) spent on platform lengthening, $500,000 (equivalent to $17.3 million in 2025) was spent on building additional entrances and exits. It was anticipated that these improvements would increase capacity by 25 percent. The northbound platform at the Jackson Avenue station was extended 140 feet (43 m) to the front, while the southbound platform was not lengthened. On January 23, 1911, ten-car express trains began running on the White Plains Road Line.

=== Later years ===
On July 1, 1917, a new connection between the White Plains Road Line and the Third Avenue elevated express tracks was opened as part of the Dual Contracts expansion of the Third Avenue Line, and since it ran via Bergen Avenue and bypassed the 149th Street station, it was called the Bergen Avenue cutoff or bypass. The Bergen Avenue cutoff was abandoned on November 5, 1946, as part of the gradual curtailment of elevated service on the IRT Third Avenue Line.

The New York State Transit Commission announced plans to extend the southbound platforms at seven stations on the line from Jackson Avenue to 177th Street to accommodate ten-car trains for $81,900 on August 8, 1934. The platform at Jackson Avenue would be lengthened from 351 feet (107 m) to 503 feet (153 m).

The city government took over the IRT's operations on June 12, 1940. On June 13, 1949, the platform extensions at this station, as well as those on White Plains Road Line stations north to 177th Street, opened. The platforms were lengthened to 514 feet (157 m) to allow full ten-car express trains to open their doors. Previously the stations could only accommodate six-car local trains.

In March 1976, the token booth and a portion of the waiting area on the northbound platform were destroyed in a fire. In 1977, the New York City Transit Authority (NYCTA) decided that it was not justified to fund the rebuild of the token booth and the cost of manning it due to the low number of entries at the platform. The NYCTA estimated that rebuilding the booth would cost $260,000 in 1980, and that $15,000 to $20,000 could be spent to install a temporary token booth, with $80,000 more to man the booth; this plan was subsequently abandoned, as it would require an estimated 570 entries per day for the booth to break-even. The NYCTA then installed a high-entry turnstile on this platform. At the time, there were at least a dozen more stations that had no token booth on one side of the tracks. While the northbound-platform station house was closed, riders were funneled directly to the exit stairs.

== Station layout ==
This station, located in Longwood, has three tracks and two side platforms. The center express track is used by the 5 train during rush hours in the peak direction. West of this station, the elevated structure widens with room for two more tracks, where the connection to the Third Avenue Line was located. These tracks diverged, with the connection to the Third Avenue local tracks going via Westchester Avenue, and the connection to the Third Avenue express tracks, the Bergen Avenue bypass going south via Bergen Avenue. Beyond the vestiges of the old connections, the line curves west and enters the tunnel into Third Avenue–149th Street. Because this station is near the tunnel portal, it is closer to the ground than the other elevated stations further north on the line.

Both platforms have beige windscreens with green outlines and red canopies with green support frames and columns in the center and lime green, waist-high, steel fences at either ends. The station signs are in the standard black with white lettering.

As with other original IRT elevated viaducts, the elevated structure at Jackson Avenue is carried on two column bents, one on each side of the road, at places where the tracks are no more than 29 feet (8.8 m) above the ground level. There is zigzag lateral bracing at intervals of every four panels.

This station has been listed on the National Register of Historic Places since September 17, 2004, because of its importance as one of the first stations built as part of the IRT subway. The 2009 artwork at the station is called Latin American Stories by George Crespo. It consists of four stained glass panels on the windscreens of each platform and two sets of window niches on each station house. They depict images from six Latin American stories, including How Fire Came to the Rain Forest and The King That Tried to Touch the Moon from the Lesser Antilles.

=== Exits ===
Both platforms have an elevated Queen Anne style station house near their rears, and there are no crossovers or crossunders between the platforms. The station houses are staggered by about 200 feet (61 m). Designed by Heins & LaFarge, the station houses consist of steel framing topped by hip roofs. The center bay of each station house includes projecting dormers used for ventilation. The top of the center bay includes a decorated gable that is supported by corbels. The red metal roof overhangs the station house and contains fleur-de-lis ridge cresting. The interiors of each station house include a small wooden-floored waiting area, as well as a niche where there was formerly a radiator. There were also restrooms inside the station houses, but these were later converted to storage areas. C-shaped brackets support signage. The staircases from each station house to street level are covered by canopies and have elaborate handrails.

On the Manhattan-bound side, doors from the platform lead to a small waiting area, where a turnstile bank provides entrance/exit from the station. Outside of fare control, there is a token booth and two sets of doors leading to two staircases facing in opposite directions that go down to the west side of Westchester Avenue. The platform has two exit-only turnstiles, each of which leads to either street staircase, to allow passengers to exit the station without having to go through the station house.

The station house on the northbound platform is unstaffed. Four doors lead to a waiting area where two High Entry/Exit Turnstiles and one exit-only turnstile provide access to/from the station. Outside fare control, a set of doors lead to balcony where two double-flight, twisting staircases go down to the northeast corner of Westchester and Jackson Avenues. The platform has one exit-only turnstile leading to the staircase balcony.
