= IRT Lenox Avenue Line =

New York City Subway line

- The 2 train serves the IRT Lenox Avenue Line south of 145th Street, while the 3 train serves the entire line at all times.

Overview
- Owner: City of New York
- Locale: Harlem, Manhattan, New York City
- Termini: Harlem–148th Street; 110th Street–Malcolm X Plaza
- Stations: 6

Service
- Type: Rapid transit
- System: New York City Subway
- Operator: New York City Transit Authority
- Daily ridership: 67,784 (2023)

History
- Opened: November 23, 1904; 121 years ago
- Last extension: 1968

Technical
- Num of tracks: 2–3
- Character: Underground (Except for Harlem–148th Street); At-grade (Harlem–148th Street)
- Track gauge: 4 ft 8 1/2 in (1,435 mm)
- Electrification: 600V DC third rail

The Lenox Avenue Line is a line of the New York City Subway, part of the A Division, mostly built as part of the first subway line. Located in Manhattan, New York City, it consists of six stations between 110th Street–Malcolm X Plaza and Harlem–148th Street, all of which are situated within the neighborhood of Harlem in Upper Manhattan.

== Extent and service ==
The following services use part or all of the IRT Lenox Avenue Line:

| | Time period | Section of line |
|---|---|---|
| "2" train | all times | south of 145th Street |
| "3" train | all times | full line |

The Lenox Avenue Line begins at the Harlem–148th Street station, which was formerly known as 148th Street–Lenox Terminal. The entire line was built under the western side of Lenox Avenue because, at the time of the line's construction in 1904, there were streetcar tracks on the eastern side of the avenue, which had conduits embedded in the street. After the terminal, a track merges from the Lenox Yard, and the line heads south under Lenox Avenue. At 142nd Street Junction, the IRT White Plains Road Line merges (with an at-grade crossing between the northbound Lenox track and the southbound White Plains track), carrying through service from the Bronx.

At the north border of Central Park is the final stop on the line, 110th Street–Malcolm X Plaza. From there the line curves southwest under the North Woods and North Meadow of Central Park, being one of three lines to pass under the park (the other two being the IND 63rd Street Line and the BMT 63rd Street Line). It heads west under 104th Street, then turns southwest and south to run underneath the IRT Broadway–Seventh Avenue Line, passing under part of the northbound platform at 103rd Street. After the center express track on the Broadway–Seventh Avenue Line ends by connecting to the two local tracks, the Lenox Avenue Line rises to become the two express tracks, with double crossovers to each local direction. The four-track Broadway–Seventh Avenue line then continues south through 96th Street, an express station and transfer point.

== History ==
=== Construction and opening ===
Planning for a subway line in New York City dates to 1864. However, development of what would become the city's first subway line did not start until 1894, when the New York State Legislature authorized the Rapid Transit Act. The subway plans were drawn up by a team of engineers led by William Barclay Parsons, chief engineer of the Rapid Transit Commission. It called for a subway line from New York City Hall in Lower Manhattan to the Upper West Side, where two branches would lead north into the Bronx. A plan was formally adopted in 1897, and legal challenges were resolved near the end of 1899. The Rapid Transit Construction Company, organized by John B. McDonald and funded by August Belmont Jr., signed the initial Contract 1 with the Rapid Transit Commission in February 1900, in which it would construct the subway and maintain a 50-year operating lease from the opening of the line. In 1901, the firm of Heins & LaFarge was hired to design the underground stations. Belmont incorporated the Interborough Rapid Transit Company (IRT) in April 1902 to operate the subway.

The IRT's East Side Branch now the Lenox Avenue Line was largely constructed as part of Section 8, built by Farrell & Hopper. The company began building the section from 110th Street to 135th Street on August 30, 1900, and the section from 103rd Street to 110th Street and Lenox Avenue on October 2, 1900. The excavation was relatively easy because the subway was under one side of Lenox Avenue and, as such, there were no street railway tracks to work around. At Lenox Avenue and 110th Street, a 6.5-foot (200 cm) diameter circular brick sewer, draining 124 acres (50 ha) of the west side of Manhattan, was intersected by the subway. A new sewer of equal diameter, but to a depth sufficient to pass beneath the subway was constructed on either side of the subway structure. Where the sewer passed beneath the subway, the brick sewer was replaced by three 42-inch (110 cm) diameter cast iron pipes.

The original plan envisioned a station on the Lenox Avenue Line at 141st Street, just south of the 142nd Street Junction, where a spur of the Lenox Avenue Line diverges to the Bronx via the IRT White Plains Road Line. North of the junction, the line would have continued to the 33-track Lenox Yard; this segment was part of Section 9A. McMullan & McBean began work on Section 9A on September 10, 1901. The 142nd Street Junction was built under soft soil due to its proximity to the shoreline of the Harlem River. As such, the contractors could not build a flying junction; instead, the tracks from the yard were to cross over the revenue-service tracks at a level junction. There originally would not have been any stations between the junction and the yard, but a station at 145th Street was added to the plan in 1903.

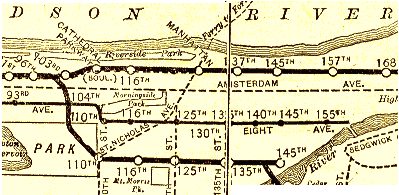
A map of the Lenox Avenue Line from 1906

The line opened south of 145th Street just after midnight on November 23, 1904, as part of the IRT's original system. It was known as the East Side Subway or East Side Branch at the time, as it was the spur of the main line to the east side. The first train ran from the line onto the IRT White Plains Road Line (known as the West Farms Branch or the West Farms Extension) just after midnight on July 10, 1905. Soon after the line opened, it was speculated that it would bring prosperity to Harlem. The line ran across the path of the Harlem Creek, a creek that had once been located above ground but had been buried by the first decade of the 20th century. The creek's presence caused flooding in the line's early years, especially around 116th Street. In April 1907, IRT officials decided to create a concrete drain beneath the Lenox Avenue Line tunnel, during which time trains in both directions ran on the southbound track during late nights. In Fiscal Year 1910, the bottom of the tunnel at the south end of the 116th Street station was rebuilt to prevent leaking.

=== Later history ===
The line has always carried trains of two service patterns. Initially, the station was served by both local and express trains. Local trains operated only to 145th Street, while express trains ran to either 145th Street or West Farms (180th Street). Express trains to 145th Street were eliminated in 1906. To address overcrowding, in 1909, the New York Public Service Commission proposed lengthening platforms at stations along the original IRT subway. As part of a modification to the IRT's construction contracts, made on January 18, 1910, the company was to lengthen station platforms to accommodate ten-car express and six-car local trains. It was anticipated that these improvements would increase capacity by 25 percent. On January 23, 1911, ten-car express trains began running on the East Side Line.

In 1918, the Broadway–Seventh Avenue Line opened south of Times Square–42nd Street, thereby dividing the original line into an H-shaped system. The city government took over the IRT's operations on June 12, 1940. The IRT routes were given numbered designations with the introduction of "R-type" rolling stock; the route to White Plains Road, formerly the route to West Farms, became known as the 2, while the route to Lenox Avenue–145th Street became the 3. Prior to February 6, 1959, 3 trains switched to the local on the IRT Broadway–Seventh Avenue Line north of 96th Street. Afterwards, all trains running from the Lenox Avenue Line ran express. The Harlem–148th Street station was opened on May 13, 1968, on land that had been part of the Lenox Yard; the station was originally called Lenox Terminal–148th Street.

Starting on March 2, 1998, the tunnel was reconstructed along with the cracked invert (tunnel floor). This was done to correct a major water problem that had existed for many years due to the continued presence of the Harlem Creek and other underground streams, which caused extensive flooding, water damage, and seepage problems that occasionally contributed to severe service disruptions. The project cost $82 million and was finished on October 12, 1998. During the reconstruction, many 2 trains were rerouted via the IRT Lexington Avenue Line, while the 3 trains were rerouted to the 137th Street–City College station on the IRT Broadway–Seventh Avenue Line. Each of the two Lenox Avenue Line tracks were alternately taken out of service, the 116th Street station was closed, and supplemental shuttle bus service connecting to other lines in the area were provided for much of this time.

From 1995 until 2008, the line's two northernmost stations, Harlem–148th Street and 145th Street, were served by shuttle buses during the late-night hours. Full-time service was restored on July 27, 2008.

On March 27, 2020, a northbound 2 train caught fire while approaching Central Park North–110th Street, the southernmost station on the line. The fire killed the train's motorman and injured 16. Subway service on the Lenox Avenue Line resumed on March 30, bypassing the Central Park North station until it reopened on April 6.

== Station listing ==
The entire line is located in Harlem.

Station service legend
| Stops all times | Stops 24 hours a day |
Time period details
| Disabled access | Station is compliant with the Americans with Disabilities Act |
| ↑ | Station is compliant with the Americans with Disabilities Act in the indicated direction only |
| ↓ | Station is compliant with the Americans with Disabilities Act in the indicated direction only |
| | Elevator access to mezzanine only |

| Disabled access | Station | Services | Opened | Notes |
|---|---|---|---|---|
| Disabled access | Harlem–148th Street | 3 | May 13, 1968 | Formerly 148th Street–Lenox Terminal |
connecting track to Lenox Yard
| | 145th Street | 3 | November 23, 1904 | Only first 5 cars open their doors No northbound entrance |
Merge from IRT White Plains Road Line at 142nd Street Junction (2 )
| Disabled access | 135th Street | 2 3 | November 23, 1904 | |
| | 125th Street | 2 3 | November 23, 1904 | M60 Select Bus Service to LaGuardia Airport |
| | 116th Street | 2 3 | November 23, 1904 | |
| | 110th Street–Malcolm X Plaza | 2 3 | November 23, 1904 | |
Tracks continue as the IRT Broadway–Seventh Avenue Line express tracks (2 3 )
