= A Division (New York City Subway) =

Division of the New York City Subway

- (42nd Street Shuttle)

Technical
- Track gauge: 4 ft 8 1/2 in (1,435 mm) standard gauge
- Minimum radius: 147.25 ft (44.88 m)
- Electrification: Third rail, 625 V DC

The A Division, also known as the IRT Division, is a division of the New York City Subway consisting of the lines whose services are designated by numbers (1, 2, 3, 4, 5, 6, 7) and the 42nd Street Shuttle. These lines and services were operated by the Interborough Rapid Transit Company (IRT) prior to the 1940 city takeover.

Because of the limitations of the infrastructure's loading gauge, A Division rolling stock is narrower, shorter, and lighter than that used on the B Division, measuring 8 feet 7 3/16 inches (2.621 m) in width and 51 feet (16 m) in length, compared with up to 10 feet (3 m) in width and 75 feet (23 m) in length for B Division cars.

== List of lines ==
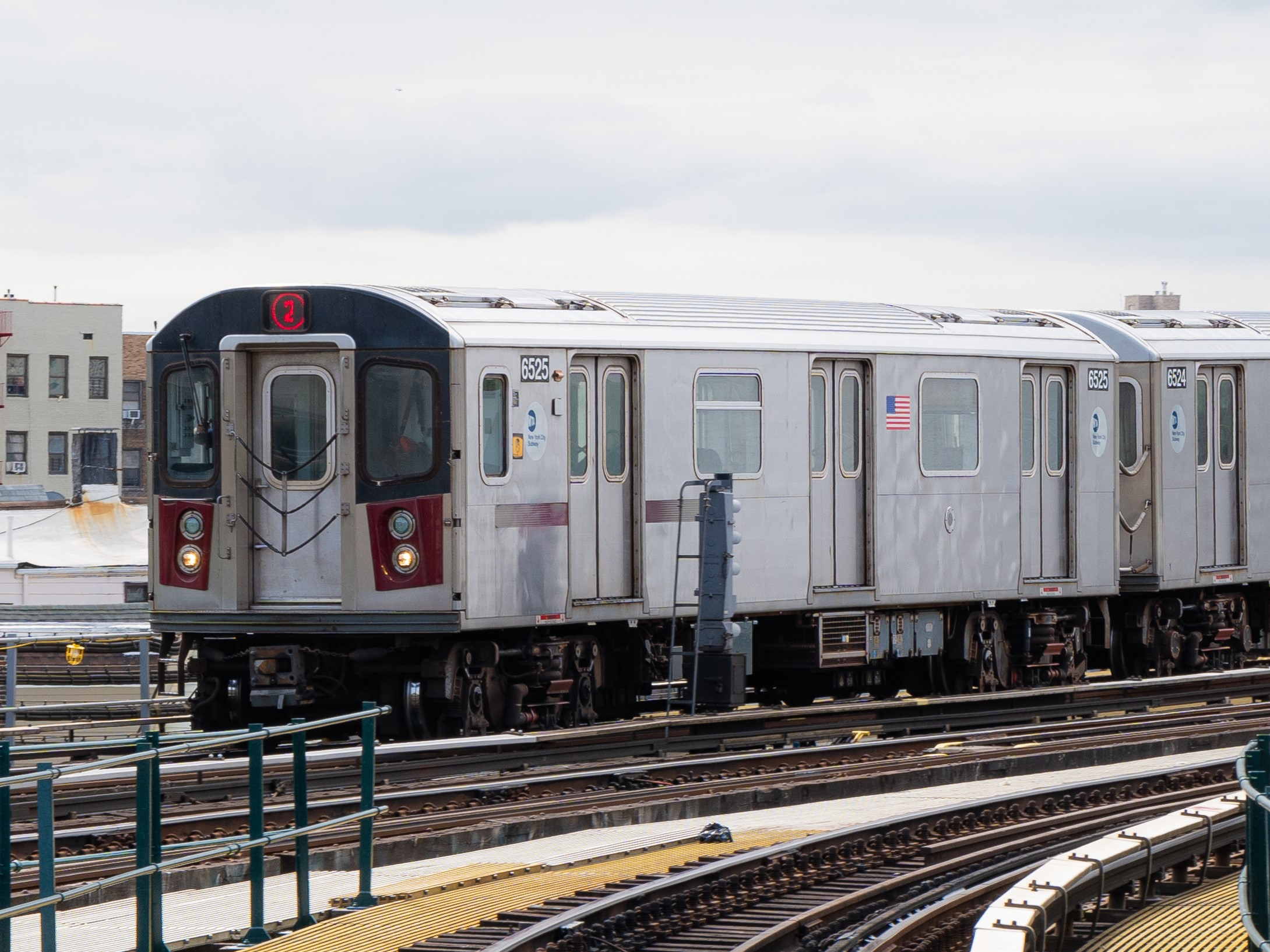
New Technology Train, common on the subway. Note the three sets of doors per car, a feature of all current A Division trains

The following lines are part of the A Division (services shown in parentheses; lines with colors next to them are trunk lines):

Station service legend
Stops all times	Stops 24 hours a day
Stops all times except late nights	Stops every day during daytime hours only
Stops late nights only	Stops every day during overnight hours only
Stops weekdays during the day	Stops during weekday daytime hours only
Stops rush hours only	Stops during weekday rush hours only
Stops rush hours in the peak direction only	Stops weekdays in the peak direction only
Time period details
Disabled access	Station is compliant with the Americans with Disabilities Act
↑	Station is compliant with the Americans with Disabilities Act in the indicated direction only
↓	Station is compliant with the Americans with Disabilities Act in the indicated direction only
	Elevator access to mezzanine only

- IRT 42nd Street Shuttle (S train)
- IRT Broadway–Seventh Avenue Line (1 2 3 trains)
- IRT Dyre Avenue Line (5 train)
- IRT Eastern Parkway Line (2 3 4 5 trains)
- IRT Flushing Line (7 <7> trains)
- IRT Jerome Avenue Line (4 5 trains)
- IRT Lenox Avenue Line (2 3 trains)
- IRT Lexington Avenue Line (4 5 6 <6> trains)
- IRT New Lots Line (2 3 4 5 trains)
- IRT Nostrand Avenue Line (2 5 trains)
- IRT Pelham Line (6 <6> trains)
- IRT White Plains Road Line (2 5 trains)

== Service history ==
Numbers were assigned to subway services in 1948:

	Name	North end/type
"1" train	Seventh Avenue Local (all times)	Broadway
"2" train	Seventh Avenue Express (all times except late nights)	White Plains Road
"3" train	Seventh Avenue Express (all times)	Lenox Avenue
"4" train	Lexington Avenue Express (all times except late nights)	Jerome
"5" train	Lexington Avenue Express (all times except late nights)	Dyre
"6" train	Lexington Avenue Local (all times)	Pelham Bay Park
"6" train	Pelham Bay Park Express peak direction (rush hours)	Pelham Bay Park
"7" train	Flushing Express peak direction (rush hours)	Flushing
"7" train	Flushing Local (all times)	Flushing

The 42nd Street Shuttle and Bowling Green–South Ferry Shuttle also provided subway services, and elevated service remained on the Third Avenue Line and Polo Grounds Shuttle.

== See also ==
- B Division (New York City Subway)
- Interborough Rapid Transit Company
- New York City Subway
