= 110th Street–Malcolm X Plaza station =

New York City Subway station in Manhattan

110 Street–Malcolm X Plaza
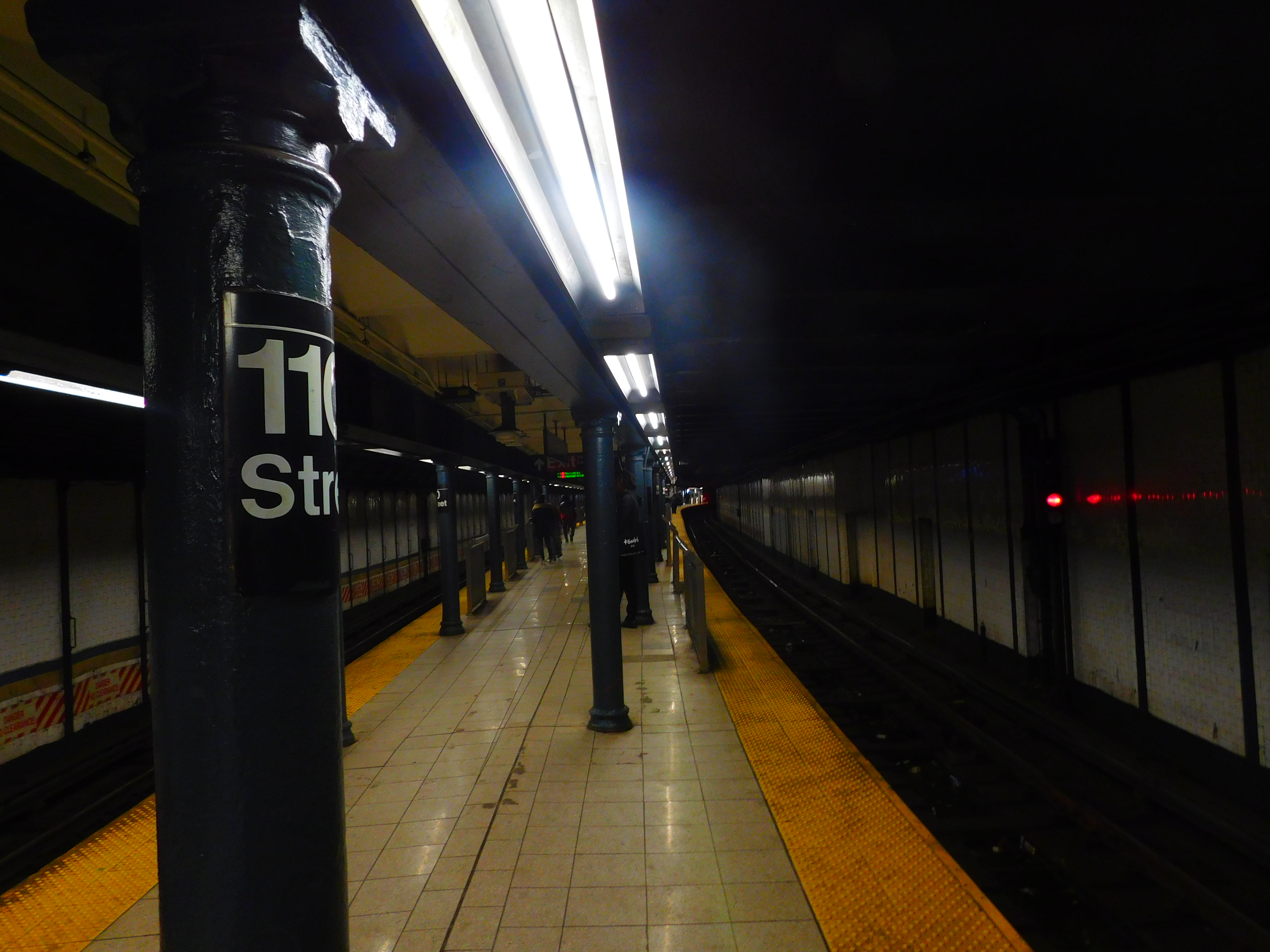
- North end of the platform, seen in 2026

Station statistics
- Address: West 110th Street & Malcolm X Boulevard; New York, New York
- Borough: Manhattan
- Locale: Harlem
- Coordinates: 40.798749°N 73.952275°W
- Division: A (IRT)
- Line: IRT Lenox Avenue Line
- Services: 2 (all times); 3 (all times)
- Transit: NYCT Bus: M2, M3, M4
- Structure: Underground
- Platforms: 1 island platform
- Tracks: 2

Other information
- Opened: November 23, 1904; 121 years ago
- Accessible: No; planned
- Former/other names: Central Park North–110th Street

Traffic
- 2025: 1,761,531 ▲13.8%
- Rank: 201 out of 423
Services
Preceding station	New York City Subway	Following station
116th Street via 135th Street	2 (New York City Subway service) 3 (New York City Subway service)	96th Street via Franklin Avenue–Medgar Evers College
Location
Location within New York City Subway
Location within New York City
Location within New York
Track layout
Street map
Station service legend
Symbol	Description
Stops all times	Stops all times

The 110th Street–Malcolm X Plaza station or the Central Park North–110th Street station is a station on the IRT Lenox Avenue Line of the New York City Subway, located at the intersection of 110th Street and Lenox Avenue at the southern edge of Harlem, Manhattan. It is served by the 2 and 3 trains at all times.

The 110th Street–Malcolm X Plaza station was constructed for the Interborough Rapid Transit Company (IRT) as part of the city's first subway line, which was approved in 1900. Construction on the tunnel to the south of 110th Street started on August 30, and construction on the tunnel to the north started on October 2 of the same year. The station was opened on November 23, 1904. The station's platform was lengthened in 1910, and the station was renamed for Malcolm X Plaza in 2025.

The 110th Street–Malcolm X Plaza station contains one island platform and two tracks. The station was built with tile and mosaic decorations. The platform contains exits to Lenox Avenue's intersections with 110th Street and 111th Street.

== History ==
=== Construction and opening ===
Planning for a subway line in New York City dates to 1864. However, development of what would become the city's first subway line did not start until 1894, when the New York State Legislature passed the Rapid Transit Act. The subway plans were drawn up by a team of engineers led by William Barclay Parsons, the Rapid Transit Commission's chief engineer. It called for a subway line from New York City Hall in Lower Manhattan to the Upper West Side, where two branches would lead north into the Bronx. A plan was formally adopted in 1897, and legal challenges were resolved near the end of 1899. The Rapid Transit Construction Company, organized by John B. McDonald and funded by August Belmont Jr., signed the initial Contract 1 with the Rapid Transit Commission in February 1900, in which it would construct the subway and maintain a 50-year operating lease from the opening of the line. In 1901, the firm of Heins & LaFarge was hired to design the underground stations. Belmont incorporated the Interborough Rapid Transit Company (IRT) in April 1902 to operate the subway.

The station was constructed as part of the IRT's East Side Branch (now the Lenox Avenue Line). Farrell & Hopper began building the section from 110th Street to 135th Street on August 30, 1900. Farrell & Hopper started constructing the section from 103rd Street to 110th Street and Lenox Avenue on October 2, 1900. The excavation was relatively easy because the subway was under one side of Lenox Avenue and there were no street railway tracks to work around. At Lenox Avenue and 110th Street, a 6.5-foot (200 cm) diameter circular brick sewer, draining 124 acres (50 ha) of the west side of Manhattan, was intersected by the subway. A new sewer of equal diameter, but to a depth sufficient to pass beneath the subway was constructed on either side of the subway structure. Where the sewer passed beneath the subway, the brick sewer was replaced by three 42-inch (110 cm) diameter cast iron pipes.

On November 23, 1904, the East Side Branch opened to 145th Street. Initially, the station was served by East Side local and express trains. Local trains ran from City Hall to Lenox Avenue (145th Street). Express trains had their southern terminus at South Ferry or Atlantic Avenue and had their northern terminus at 145th Street or West Farms (180th Street). Express trains to 145th Street were eliminated in 1906, and West Farms express trains operated through to Atlantic Avenue in Brooklyn.

=== Service changes and station renovations ===
To address overcrowding, in 1909, the New York Public Service Commission proposed lengthening the platforms at stations along the original IRT subway. As part of a modification to the IRT's construction contracts made on January 18, 1910, the company was to lengthen station platforms to accommodate ten-car express and six-car local trains. In addition to $1.5 million (equivalent to $51.8 million in 2025) spent on platform lengthening, $500,000 (equivalent to $17.3 million in 2025) was spent on building additional entrances and exits. It was anticipated that these improvements would increase capacity by 25 percent. The platform at the Central Park North–110th Street station was extended 145 feet (44 m) to the north. On January 23, 1911, ten-car express trains began running on the East Side Line.

In 1918, the Broadway–Seventh Avenue Line opened south of Times Square–42nd Street, and the original line was divided into an H-shaped system. Local trains were sent to South Ferry, while express trains used the new Clark Street Tunnel to Brooklyn.

The city government took over the IRT's operations on June 12, 1940. The IRT routes were given numbered designations with the introduction of "R-type" rolling stock. These fleet contained rollsigns with numbered designations for each service. The first such fleet, the R12, was put into service in 1948. The route to White Plains Road, formerly the route to West Farms, became known as the 2, while the route to Lenox Avenue–145th Street became the 3. The New York City Transit Authority (NYCTA) announced plans in 1956 to add fluorescent lights above the edges of the station's platforms. In 1959, all 2 and 3 trains became express. In November 1959, the Warshaw Construction Company received a contract to remove fifteen entrance/exit kiosks on IRT lines, including three at the 110th Street station: two at the 111th Street entrance and one at the 110th Street entrance. This was part of a citywide initiative to remove the kiosks, which obstructed motorists' views of pedestrians.

Starting on March 2, 1998, the tunnel was reconstructed along with the cracked tunnel floor. This was done to correct a major water problem that had existed for many years due to the presence of the Harlem Creek and other underground streams, which caused extensive flooding, water damage, and seepage problems that occasionally contributed to severe service disruptions. The project cost $82 million and was finished on October 12, 1998. During the reconstruction, many 2 trains were rerouted via the IRT Lexington Avenue Line, while the 3 trains were rerouted to the 137th Street–City College station on the IRT Broadway–Seventh Avenue Line. Each of the two Lenox Avenue Line tracks were alternately taken out of service and supplemental shuttle bus service connecting to other lines in the area were provided for much of this time.

On March 27, 2020, a northbound 2 train caught fire as it entered the Central Park North–110th Street station, killing the operator, injuring at least 16 others, and severely damaging the station. The incident was investigated as a possible arson, as several other fires had been observed in nearby stations.

On August 10, 2025, governor Kathy Hochul renamed the station in honor of Malcolm X to 110th Street-Malcolm X Plaza station during Harlem Week. The renaming coincided with several upgrades to the station. As part of its 2025–2029 Capital Program, the MTA has proposed making the station wheelchair-accessible in compliance with the Americans with Disabilities Act of 1990.

== Station layout ==
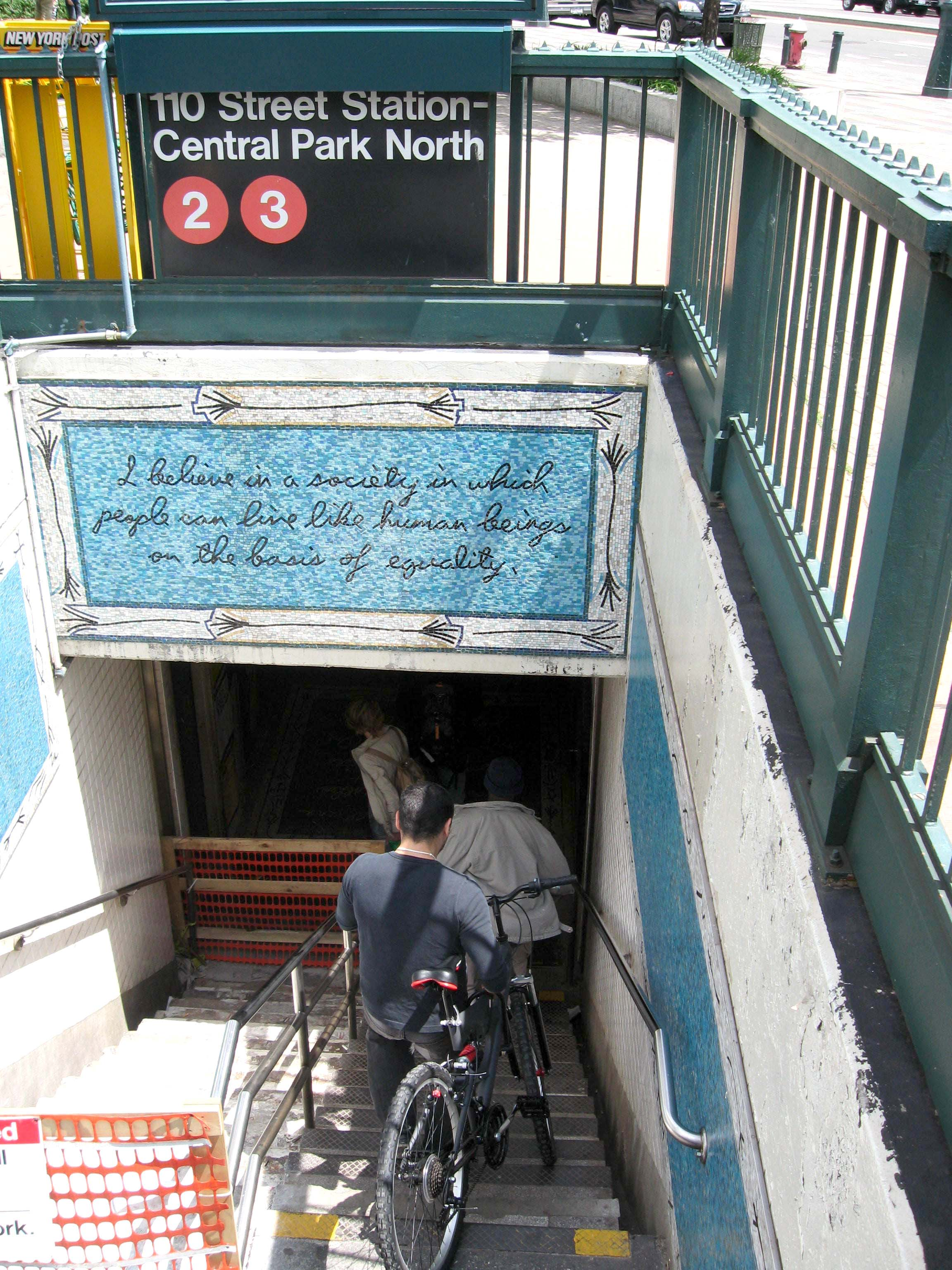
The entrance to the 110th Street-Central Park North station

The 110th Street–Malcolm X Plaza station has two tracks and an island platform. The 2 and 3 trains stop here at all times. The station is between 96th Street to the south and 116th Street to the north. The platform was originally 350 feet (110 m) long, like at other stations north of 96th Street. Fixed platform barriers, which are intended to prevent commuters falling to the tracks, are positioned near the platform edges. The platform is wider at its south end than at its north, where it was extended in the 1950s and the tracks curve.

This underground station is the southernmost station on the Lenox Avenue Line. South of this station, the line turns southwest under the Great Hill and North Woods of Central Park, then west under 104th Street, and then south once again at Broadway, merging with the IRT Broadway–Seventh Avenue Line to become the express tracks of that line.

=== Design ===
As with other stations built as part of the original IRT, the station was constructed using a cut-and-cover method. The tunnel is covered by a U-shaped trough that contains utility pipes and wires. The bottom of this trough contains a foundation of concrete no less than 4 inches (100 mm) thick. The platform consists of 3-inch-thick (7.6 cm) concrete slabs, beneath which are drainage basins. The original platform contains circular, cast-iron Doric-style columns spaced every 15 feet (4.6 m), while the platform extensions contain I-beam columns. Additional columns beside the tracks, spaced every 5 feet (1.5 m), support the jack-arched concrete station roofs. There is a 1-inch (25 mm) gap between the trough wall and the track walls, which are made of 4-inch (100 mm)-thick brick covered over by a tiled finish.

The original decorative scheme consisted of blue/green tile panels and green and buff tile bands. The mosaic tiles at all original IRT stations were manufactured by the American Encaustic Tile Company, which subcontracted the installations at each station. The decorative work was performed by tile contractor John H. Parry. The station's artwork, installed during a 1998 renovation, is called Message from Malcolm by Maren Hassinger. It consists of mosaic panels on the platform and main fare control area's street stairs that depict quotes and writings by Malcolm X written in script and surrounded by mosaic borders.

=== Exits ===
This station has two fare control areas, both of which are on platform level. The full-time one is at the south end and has a bank of four turnstiles, token booth, and double-wide staircase going up to the northwest corner of Central Park North and Malcolm X Boulevard. A full height turnstile at the center of the platform leads to a staircase that goes up to the northwest corner of West 111th Street and Malcolm X Boulevard.
