= 125th Street station (IRT Lenox Avenue Line) =

New York City Subway station in Manhattan

125 Street
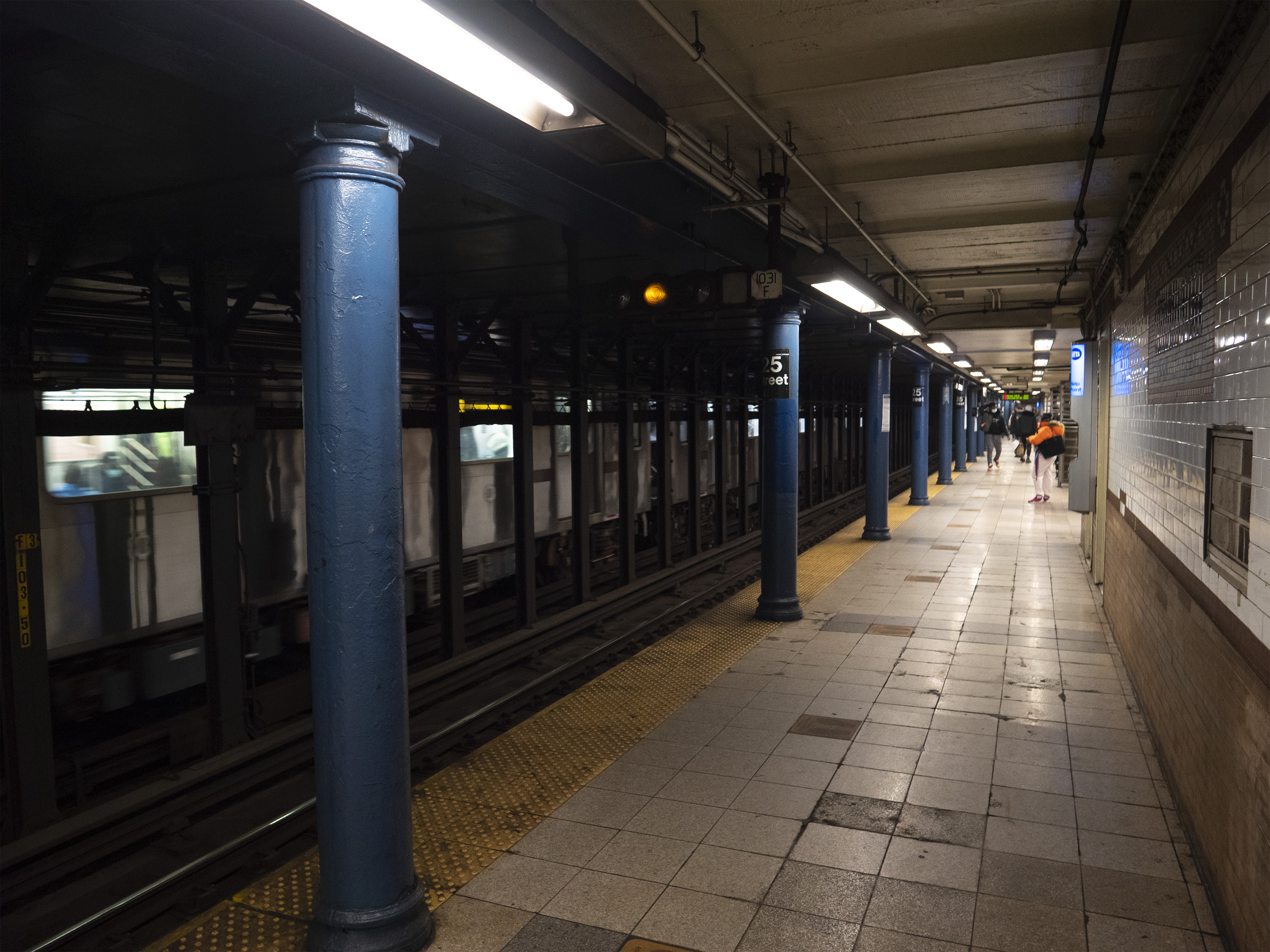
- A southbound R142 2 train at the station

Station statistics
- Address: West 125th Street & Malcolm X Boulevard; New York, New York
- Borough: Manhattan
- Locale: Harlem
- Coordinates: 40.807°N 73.945°W
- Division: A (IRT)
- Line: IRT Lenox Avenue Line
- Services: 2 (all times); 3 (all times)
- Transit: NYCT Bus: M7, M60 SBS, M101, M102, M125
- Structure: Underground
- Platforms: 2 side platforms
- Tracks: 2

Other information
- Opened: November 23, 1904; 121 years ago
- Accessible: No; planned

Traffic
- 2025: 3,311,228 ▲12.5%
- Rank: 112 out of 423
Services
Preceding station	New York City Subway	Following station
135th Street services split	2 (New York City Subway service) 3 (New York City Subway service)	116th Street via Franklin Avenue–Medgar Evers College
Location
Location within New York City Subway
Location within New York City
Location within New York
Track layout
Street map
Station service legend
Symbol	Description
Stops all times	Stops all times

The 125th Street station (referred to on some strip maps as 125th Street–Lenox Avenue) is a station on the IRT Lenox Avenue Line of the New York City Subway. Located at the intersection of 125th Street (also known as Dr. Martin Luther King Jr Boulevard) and Lenox Avenue (also known as Malcolm X Boulevard) in Harlem, it is served by the 2 and 3 trains at all times.

The 125th Street station was constructed for the Interborough Rapid Transit Company (IRT) as part of the city's first subway line, which was approved in 1900. Construction on the tunnel segment that includes the 125th Street station started on October 2 of the same year. The station opened on November 23, 1904. The station platforms were lengthened in 1910.

The 125th Street station contains two side platforms and two tracks. The station was built with tile and mosaic decorations. The platforms contain exits to Lenox Avenue's intersection with 125th Street and are not connected to each other within fare control.

== History ==
=== Construction and opening ===
Planning for a subway line in New York City dates to 1864. However, development of what would become the city's first subway line did not start until 1894, when the New York State Legislature passed the Rapid Transit Act. The subway plans were drawn up by a team of engineers led by William Barclay Parsons, the Rapid Transit Commission's chief engineer. It called for a subway line from New York City Hall in lower Manhattan to the Upper West Side, where two branches would lead north into the Bronx. A plan was formally adopted in 1897, and legal challenges were resolved near the end of 1899. The Rapid Transit Construction Company, organized by John B. McDonald and funded by August Belmont Jr., signed the initial Contract 1 with the Rapid Transit Commission in February 1900, in which it would construct the subway and maintain a 50-year operating lease from the opening of the line. In 1901, the firm of Heins & LaFarge was hired to design the underground stations. Belmont incorporated the Interborough Rapid Transit Company (IRT) in April 1902 to operate the subway.

The 125th Street station was constructed as part of the IRT's East Side Branch (now the Lenox Avenue Line). Farrell & Hopper began building the section from 110th Street to 135th Street on August 30, 1900, subcontracting the section north of 116th Street to John C. Rodgers. The excavation was relatively easy because the subway was under one side of Lenox Avenue and there were no street railway tracks to work around.

On November 23, 1904, the East Side Branch opened to 145th Street. Initially, the station was served by East Side local and express trains. Local trains ran from City Hall to Lenox Avenue (145th Street). Express trains had their southern terminus at South Ferry or Atlantic Avenue and had their northern terminus at 145th Street or West Farms (180th Street). Express trains to 145th Street were eliminated in 1906, and West Farms express trains operated through to Atlantic Avenue in Brooklyn.

=== Service changes and station renovations ===
To address overcrowding, in 1909, the New York Public Service Commission proposed lengthening the platforms at stations along the original IRT subway. As part of a modification to the IRT's construction contracts made on January 18, 1910, the company was to lengthen station platforms to accommodate ten-car express and six-car local trains. In addition to $1.5 million (equivalent to $51.8 million in 2025) spent on platform lengthening, $500,000 (equivalent to $17.3 million in 2025) was spent on building additional entrances and exits. It was anticipated that these improvements would increase capacity by 25 percent. The platforms at the 125th Street station were extended 55 feet (17 m) to both the north and south. On January 23, 1911, ten-car express trains began running on the East Side Branch.

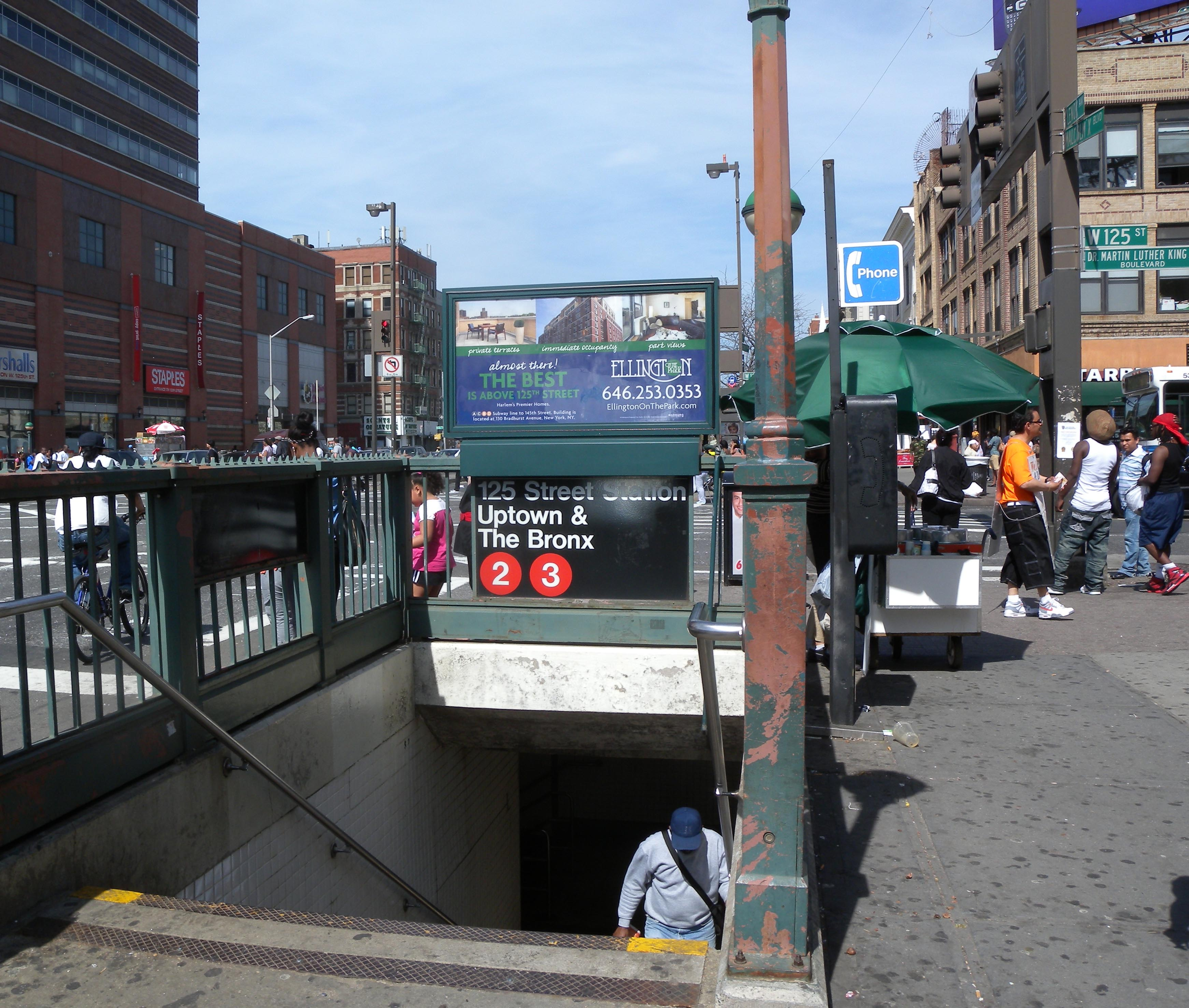
Northbound street stair

In 1918, the Broadway–Seventh Avenue Line opened south of Times Square–42nd Street, and the original line was divided into an H-shaped system. Local trains were sent to South Ferry, while express trains used the new Clark Street Tunnel to Brooklyn.

The city government took over the IRT's operations on June 12, 1940. The IRT routes were given numbered designations with the introduction of "R-type" rolling stock. These fleet contained rollsigns with numbered designations for each service. The first such fleet, the R12, was put into service in 1948. The route to White Plains Road, formerly the route to West Farms, became known as the 2, while the route to Lenox Avenue–145th Street became the 3. The New York City Transit Authority (NYCTA) announced plans in 1956 to add fluorescent lights above the edges of the station's platforms. In 1959, all 2 and 3 trains became express. In November 1959, the Warshaw Construction Company received a contract to remove fifteen entrance/exit kiosks on IRT lines, including four at the 125th Street station. This was part of a citywide initiative to remove the kiosks, which obstructed motorists' views of pedestrians.

On May 23, 1968, poet Henry Dumas was fatally shot by a New York City Transit Police officer on the station's southbound platform.

In 1981, the Metropolitan Transportation Authority listed the station among the 69 most deteriorated stations in the subway system. Starting on March 2, 1998, the tunnel was reconstructed along with the cracked tunnel floor. This was done to correct a major water problem that had existed for many years due to the presence of the Harlem Creek and other underground streams, which caused extensive flooding, water damage, and seepage problems that occasionally contributed to severe service disruptions. The project cost $82 million and was finished on October 12, 1998. During the reconstruction, many 2 trains were rerouted via the IRT Lexington Avenue Line, while the 3 trains were rerouted to the 137th Street–City College station on the IRT Broadway–Seventh Avenue Line. Each of the two Lenox Avenue Line tracks were alternately taken out of service and supplemental shuttle bus service connecting to other lines in the area were provided for much of this time.

The MTA announced in 2024 that it would replace the station's existing waist-high turnstiles with taller, wide-aisle turnstiles. As part of its 2025–2029 Capital Program, the MTA has proposed making the station wheelchair-accessible in compliance with the Americans with Disabilities Act of 1990. The MTA also refurbished the station in 2026.

In January 2026, Governor Kathy Hochul announced that she would request funding to extend the Second Avenue Subway along 125th Street. Although Phase 2 of the line's construction was initially planned to extend only to 125th Street and Lexington Avenue, Hochul's proposal called for additional connections to existing stations at Lenox Avenue, St. Nicholas Avenue, and Broadway.

== Station layout ==
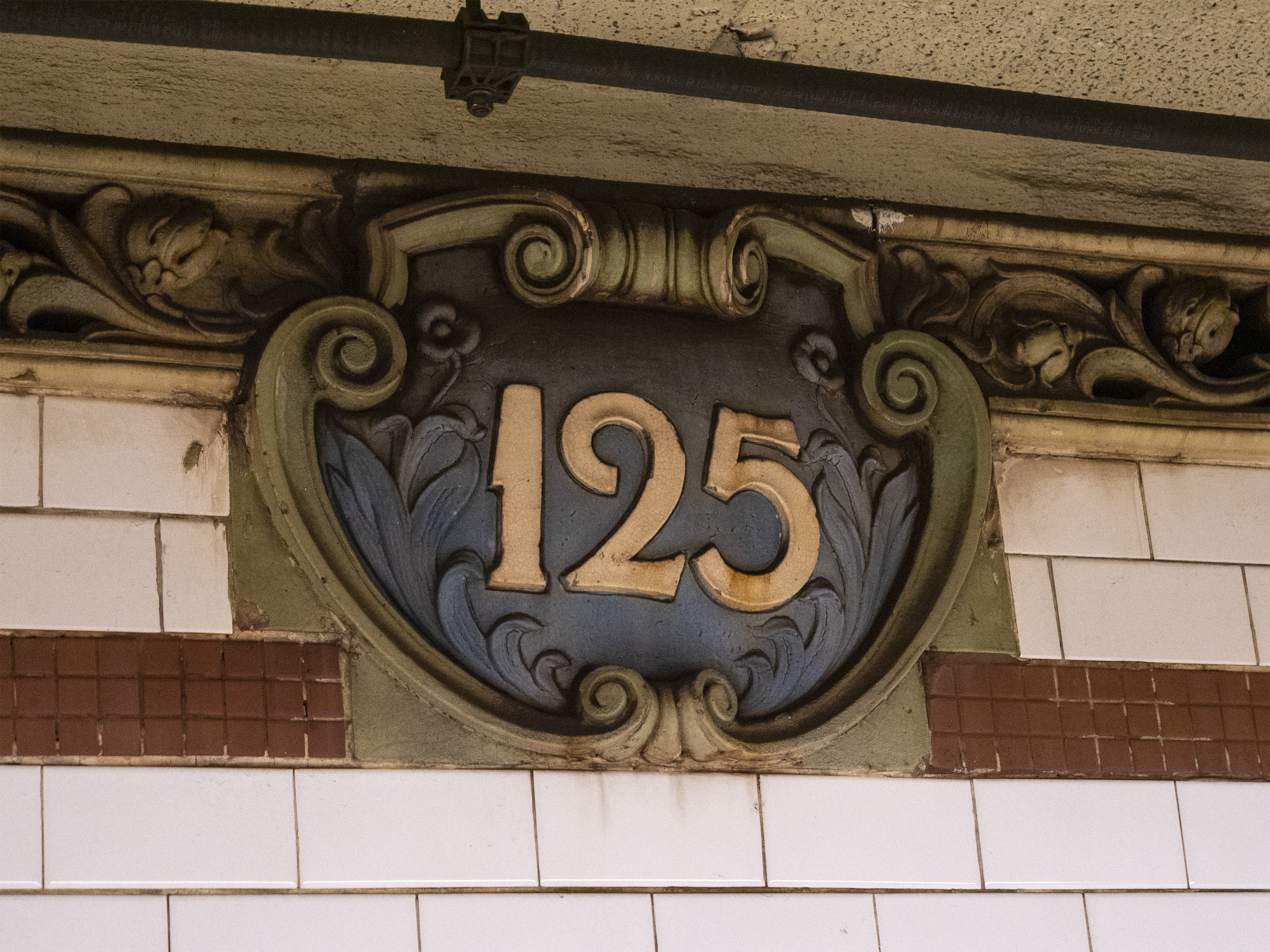
Original plaque

The station has two tracks and two side platforms. The 2 and 3 trains stop here at all times. The station is between 116th Street to the south and 135th Street to the north. The platforms were originally 350 feet (110 m) long, like at other stations north of 96th Street. The platform extensions are at the north ends of the original platforms. Fixed platform barriers, which are intended to prevent commuters falling to the tracks, are positioned near the platform edges. Fare control is at platform level. There are no crossovers or crossunders between the two side platforms to allow free transfer between directions.

=== Design ===
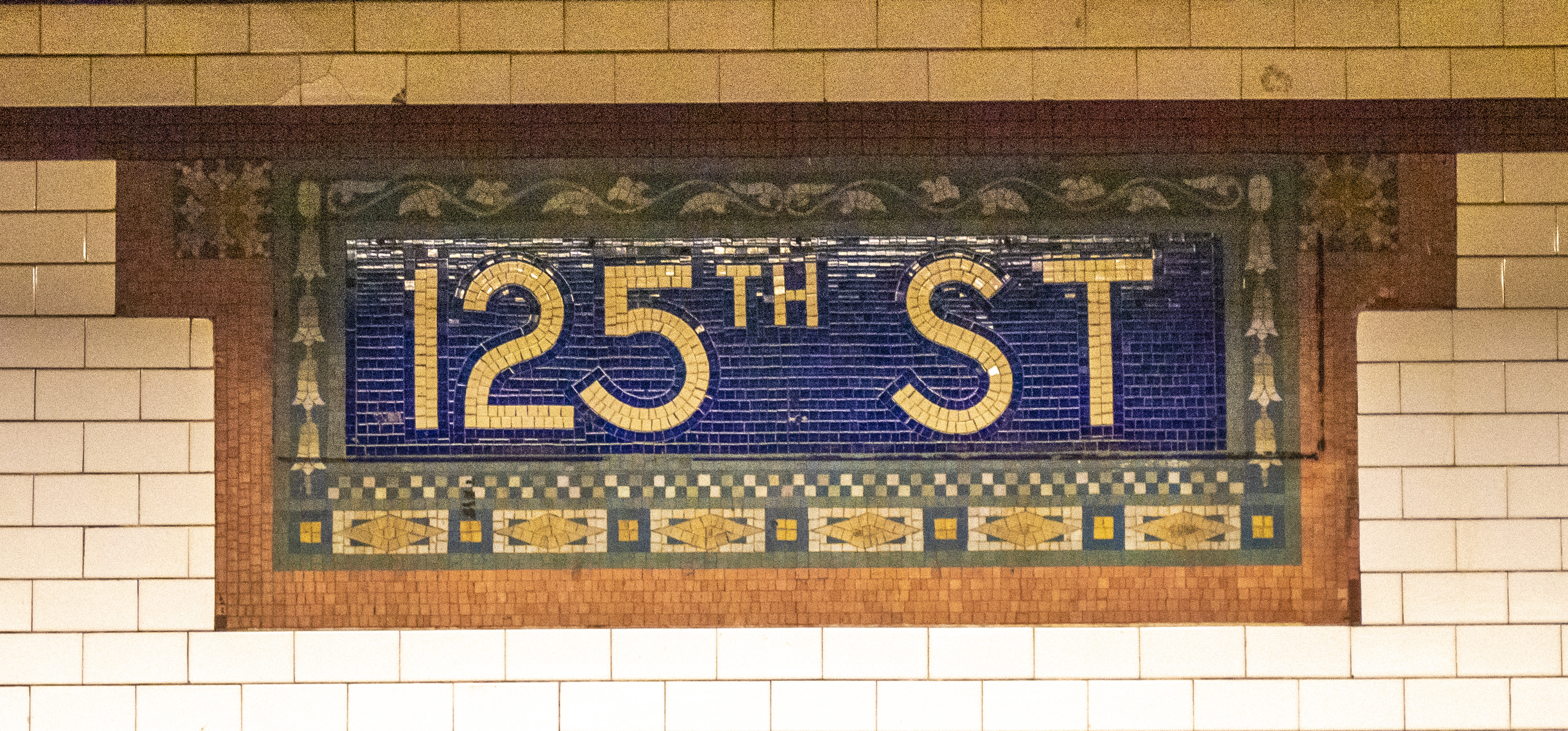
A remaining original name tablet

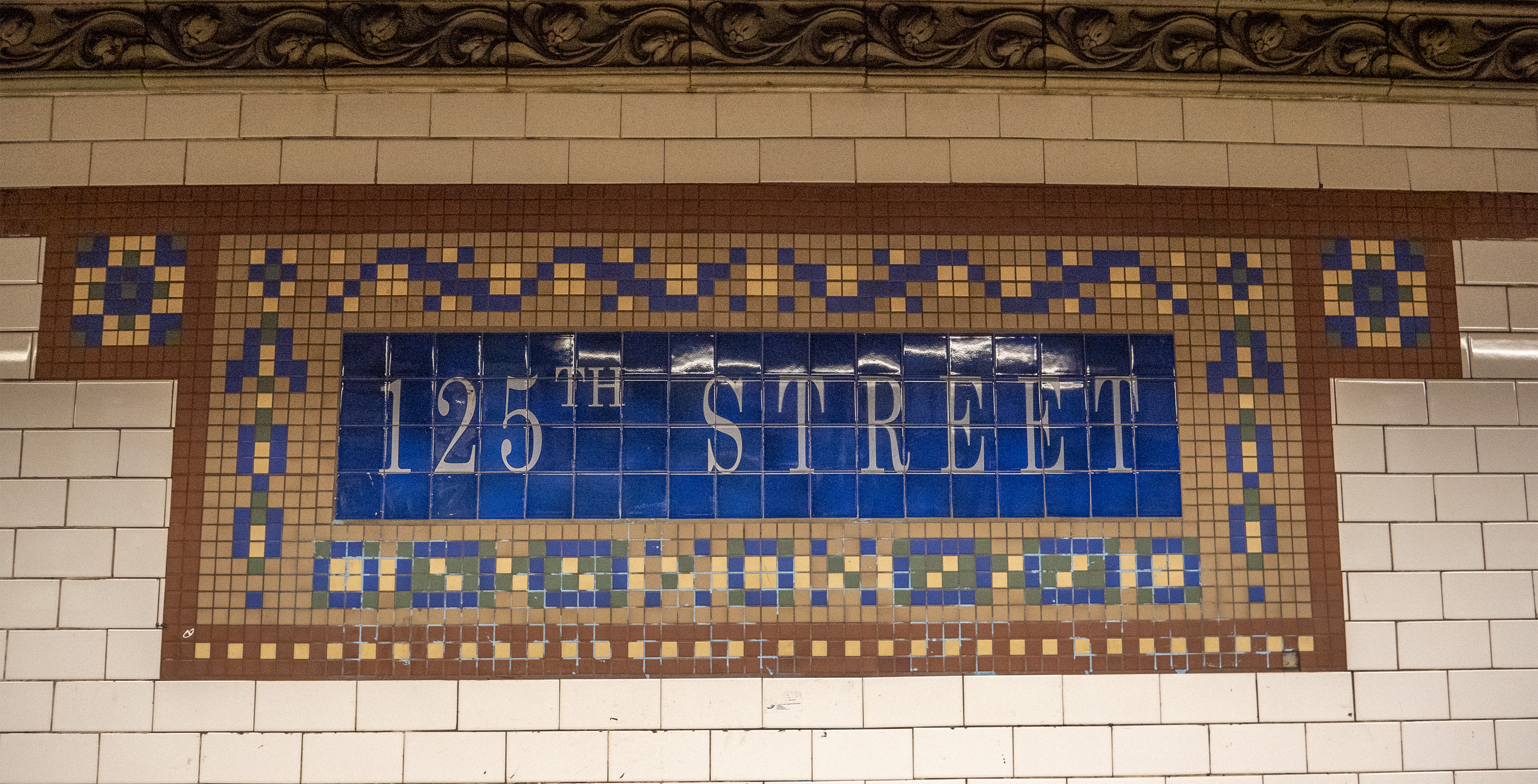
Newer name tablet

As with other stations built as part of the original IRT, the station was constructed using a cut-and-cover method. The tunnel is covered by a U-shaped trough that contains utility pipes and wires. This trough contains a foundation of concrete no less than 4 inches (100 mm) thick. The platforms consist of 3-inch-thick (7.6 cm) concrete slabs, beneath which are drainage basins. The original platforms contain circular, cast-iron Doric-style columns spaced every 15 feet (4.6 m), while the platform extensions contain I-beam columns. Additional columns between the tracks, spaced every 5 feet (1.5 m), support the jack-arched concrete station roofs. There is a 1-inch (25 mm) gap between the trough wall and the platform walls, which are made of 4-inch (100 mm)-thick brick covered over by a tiled finish.

The original decorative scheme consists of blue tile station-name tablets, pink tile bands, a green terracotta cornice, and dark blue terracotta plaques. The mosaic tiles at all original IRT stations were manufactured by the American Encaustic Tile Company, which subcontracted the installations at each station. The decorative work was performed by tile contractor Manhattan Glass Tile Company and terracotta contractor Atlantic Terra Cotta Company. Many of the original name tablets have since been replaced with newer renditions, but most of the plaques remain intact.

The artwork in the station is Flying Home: Harlem Heroes and Heroines, by Faith Ringgold, installed in 1996.

=== Exits ===
Two staircases from each platform lead to the intersection of Lenox Avenue and West 125th Street. The staircases from the southbound platform lead to the western corners, while those from the northbound platform lead to the eastern corners.
