= 2020 New York City Subway fire =

Deadly fire in Manhattan, New York

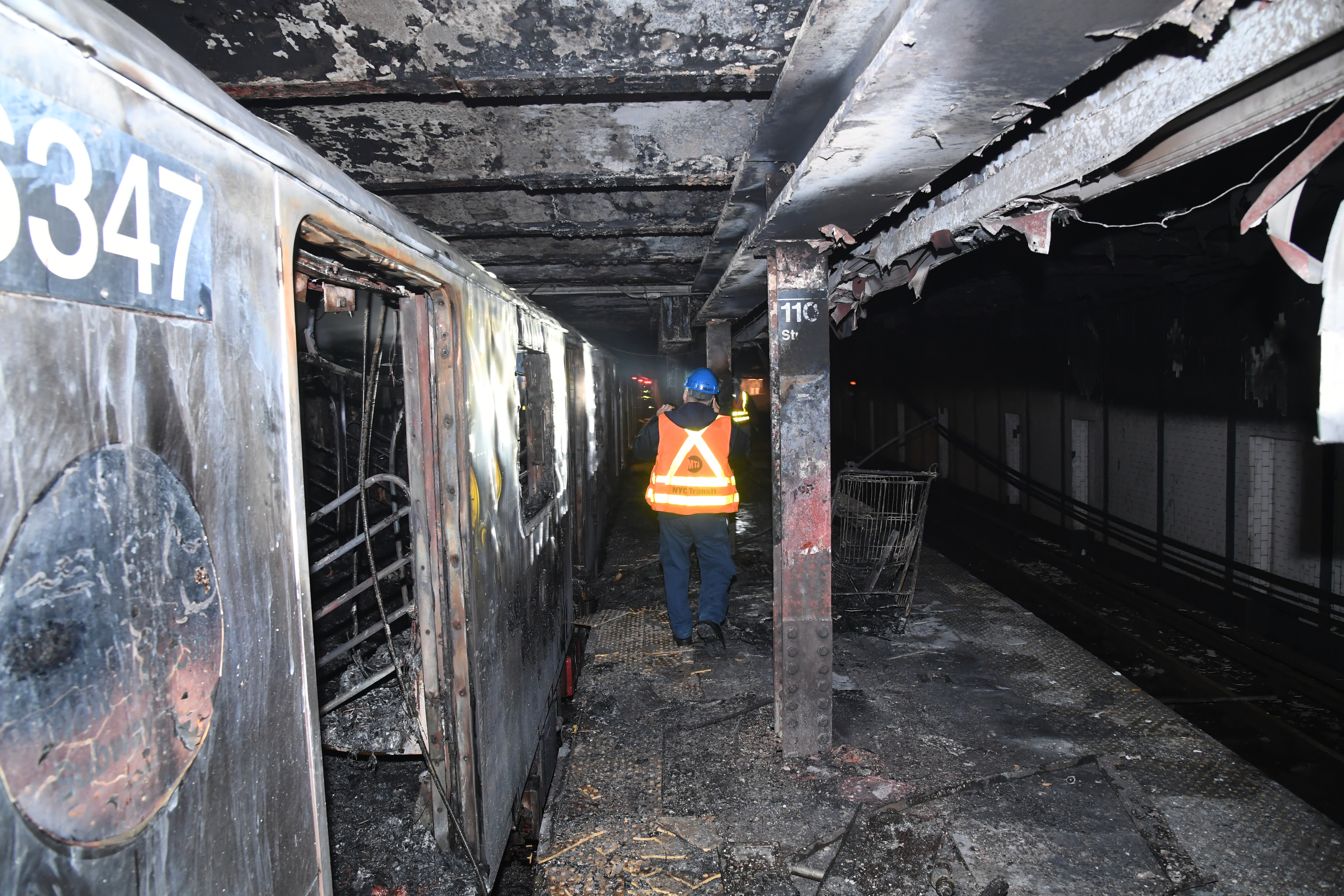
- Aftermath of the fire

Details
- Date: March 27, 2020; 3:15 a.m.
- Location: between 96th Street and Central Park North–110th Street
- Coordinates: 40.7987°N 73.9523°W
- Country: United States
- Line: IRT Lenox Avenue Line
- Operator: New York City Transit Authority
- Incident type: Fire
- Cause: Arson

Statistics
- Trains: 1
- Crew: 2
- Deaths: 1
- Injured: 16 (4 serious)
- Damage: Severe fire damage to several subway cars and additional damage to the Central Park North–110th Street station

On the early morning of March 27, 2020, at around 3:15 AM, a northbound 2 train of the New York City Subway was set on fire as it entered the Central Park North–110th Street station in Harlem, New York. The fire killed the train operator, injured at least 16 others, and severely damaged the north part of the station and the train cars. Metropolitan Transportation Authority (MTA) officials said the conductor and an MTA employee successfully evacuated passengers from the train and off the platform. Passengers and crew from a second train, behind the train with the fire, were also evacuated.

== Incident ==
In the early morning hours of March 27, 2020, a northbound 2 train was operating its late night local run between Flatbush Avenue–Brooklyn College station and Wakefield–241st Street station. The train consisted of ten R142 cars comprising two five-car train sets numbered 6346–6350 and 6366–6370. While moving north between 96th Street and 110th Street, a fire erupted aboard the second car of the train, 6347, and the train arrived into 110th Street engulfed in flames. Firefighters responded to the fire around 3:18 am. It took 100 firefighters to control the fire.

A northbound 3 train behind the 2 train was evacuated in the tunnel. At the time of the fire, there was extremely low visibility due to the intense smoke which also began to seep through the station entrances to 110th Street. After the fire was extinguished, it was revealed that 6347 had suffered severe fire damage, as well as additional fire and smoke damage to the 110th Street station and the rest of the train consists.

Sixteen people were injured, with four suffering serious injuries; the injured included five firefighters. The motorman, identified as 36-year-old Garrett Goble, was found on the tracks and pronounced dead shortly after. He was the only fatality in the fire.

== Investigation ==
Additional fires were reported at the 86th Street, 96th Street, and 116th Street stations around the same time, and because of this, the incident was investigated as a possible arson. An "apparently emotionally disturbed person" was questioned in connection to the 110th Street fire. Authorities also reported a shopping cart was set on fire aboard the second car of the train.

The MTA offered a $50,000 reward in order to find the person responsible for the fire. The NYPD released a picture of a "person of interest" in association with the fire two days later. Two days after the release of the picture, police arrested Nathaniel Avinger, who was suspected of starting the fire in addition to fires elsewhere, on March 31. Avinger was eventually charged with the murder of Goble after being arrested for an unrelated crime in December 2020. He was deemed unfit to stand trial and, as of March 2025, was in a psychiatric facility.

== Aftermath ==
Train service along the IRT Lenox Avenue Line was suspended as a result of the incident. 2 trains operated along the IRT Lexington Avenue Line between 149th Street–Grand Concourse and Atlantic Avenue–Barclays Center while 3 trains operated via the IRT Broadway–Seventh Avenue Line to/from 137th Street–City College. Shuttle buses operated along the closed stations. The 86th Street and 96th Street stations were also temporarily closed to allow FDNY to continue their investigation. Service along the IRT Lenox Avenue Line resumed on March 30 while bypassing Central Park North–110th Street, which was closed for repairs. The station was reopened on April 6, 2020.

A memorial for Goble was set up at the Flatbush Avenue–Brooklyn College station on May 24, 2021.

Cars 6346–6350 were written off as they were damaged beyond repair, while cars 6366–6370 were later repaired and returned to service.

== See also ==
- List of transportation fires
