= 145th Street station (IRT Lenox Avenue Line) =

New York City Subway station in Manhattan

145 Street
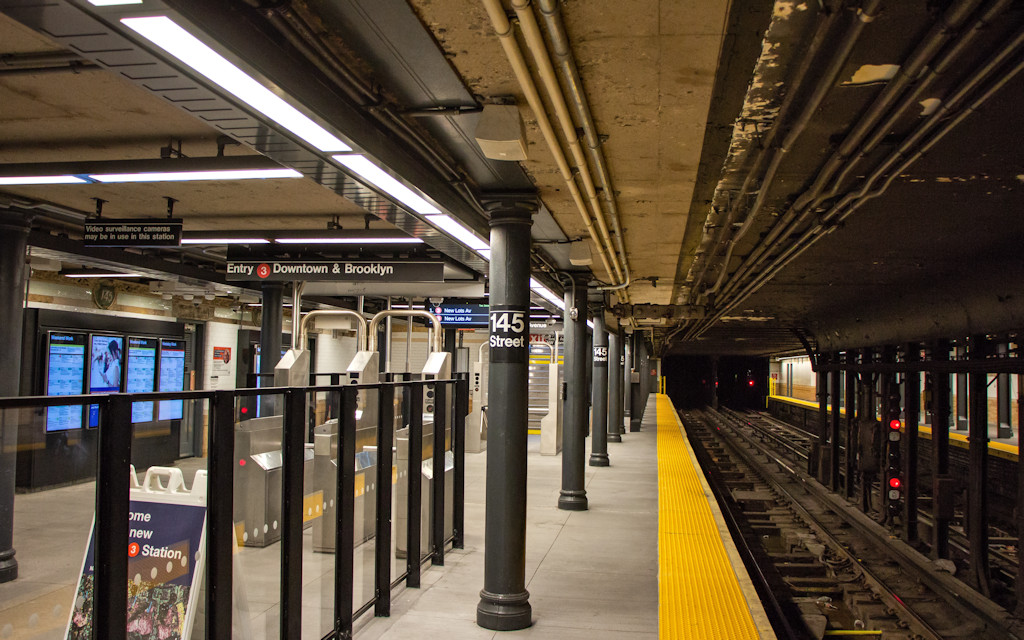
- Downtown platform

Station statistics
- Address: West 145th Street & Malcolm X Boulevard; New York, New York
- Borough: Manhattan
- Locale: Harlem
- Coordinates: 40°49′14″N 73°56′10″W
- Division: A (IRT)
- Line: IRT Lenox Avenue Line
- Services: 3 (all times)
- Transit: NYCT Bus: M1, M7, M102, Bx19
- Structure: Underground
- Platforms: 2 side platforms
- Tracks: 2

Other information
- Opened: November 23, 1904; 121 years ago
- Closed: July 23, 2018; 8 years ago (reconstruction)
- Rebuilt: November 28, 2018; 7 years ago

Traffic
- 2025: 652,382 ▲14.1%
- Rank: 363 out of 423
Services
Preceding station	New York City Subway	Following station
Harlem–148th Street Terminus	3 (New York City Subway service)	135th Street toward New Lots Avenue
Location
Location within New York City Subway
Location within New York City
Location within New York
Track layout
Street map
Station service legend
Symbol	Description
Stops all times	Stops all times
- 145th Street Subway Station (IRT)
- U.S. National Register of Historic Places
- New York State Register of Historic Places
- MPS: New York City Subway System MPS
- NRHP reference No.: 05000231
- NYSRHP No.: 06101.015032

Significant dates
- Added to NRHP: March 30, 2005
- Designated NYSRHP: December 18, 2004

The 145th Street station is a station on the IRT Lenox Avenue Line of the New York City Subway. Located at the intersection of 145th Street and Lenox Avenue in Harlem, Manhattan, it is served by the 3 train at all times. Built for the Interborough Rapid Transit Company (IRT), the 145th Street station contains two side platforms that can only fit six and a half train cars, unlike almost all other IRT stations, which are able to fit full-length ten-car trains.

The station opened in 1904 as one of the northern termini of the original subway line operated by the IRT. With the construction of the Harlem–148th Street station to the north in the 1960s, the 145th Street station was planned to be closed, but due to community opposition and passengers' protests, the station remained open. Since the 145th Street station is the second-to-last stop on the line, entry is provided only to the southbound platform, although northbound customers are allowed to exit from this station. The station was added to the National Register of Historic Places in 2005, and was closed from July to November 2018 for extensive renovations.

The 145th Street station contains two side platforms and two tracks. The station was built with tile and mosaic decorations. The platforms contain exits to Lenox Avenue's intersection with 145th Street and are not connected to each other within fare control.

== History ==
=== Construction and opening ===
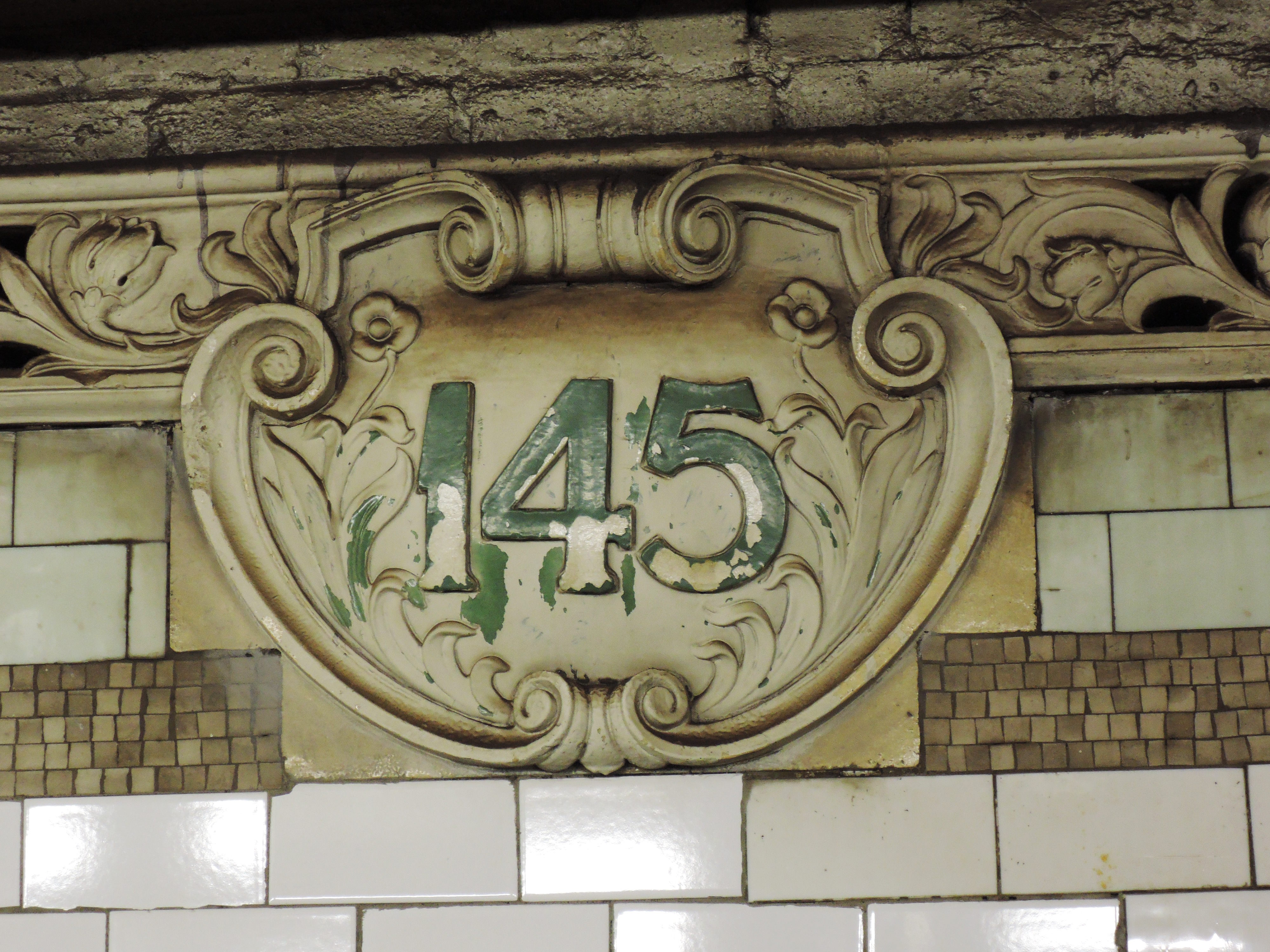
Original terra cotta cartouche

Planning for a subway line in New York City dates to 1864. However, development of what would become the city's first subway line did not start until 1894, when the New York State Legislature passed the Rapid Transit Act. The subway plans were drawn up by a team of engineers led by William Barclay Parsons, the Rapid Transit Commission's chief engineer. It called for a subway line from New York City Hall in lower Manhattan to the Upper West Side, where two branches would lead north into the Bronx. A plan was formally adopted in 1897, and legal challenges were resolved near the end of 1899. The Rapid Transit Construction Company, organized by John B. McDonald and funded by August Belmont Jr., signed the initial Contract 1 with the Rapid Transit Commission in February 1900, in which it would construct the subway and maintain a 50-year operating lease from the opening of the line. In 1901, the firm of Heins & LaFarge was hired to design the underground stations. Belmont incorporated the Interborough Rapid Transit Company (IRT) in April 1902 to operate the subway.

The 145th Street station was constructed as part of the IRT's East Side Branch (now the Lenox Avenue Line). The original plan envisioned a station on the Lenox Avenue Line at 141st Street, just south of the 142nd Street Junction, where a spur of the Lenox Avenue Line diverges to the Bronx via the IRT White Plains Road Line. This was ultimately not built, and instead, the 145th Street station became the last stop on the Lenox Avenue Line before it entered the Lenox Yard, a train maintenance yard immediately to the north. McMullan & McBean began work on the section from 135th Street and Lenox Avenue to Gerard Avenue and 149th Street, including the 145th Street spur, on September 10, 1901.

On November 23, 1904, the East Side Branch opened to 145th Street. Initially, the station was served by East Side local and express trains. Local trains ran from City Hall to Lenox Avenue (145th Street). Express trains had their southern terminus at South Ferry or Atlantic Avenue and had their northern terminus at 145th Street or West Farms (180th Street). South of the station, most northbound trains used a switch to access the western platform, which served both entering and exiting passengers; the train would then reenter service in the southbound direction. Northbound trains heading to Lenox Yard would drop off passengers on the eastern platform, which was an exit-only platform and did not have any ticket booths. Express trains to 145th Street were eliminated in 1906.

=== Later years ===
In 1918, the Broadway–Seventh Avenue Line opened south of Times Square–42nd Street, and the original line was divided into an H-shaped system. Local trains were sent to South Ferry. The city government took over the IRT's operations on June 12, 1940. The IRT routes were given numbered designations with the introduction of "R-type" rolling stock. These fleet contained rollsigns with numbered designations for each service. The first such fleet, the R12, was put into service in 1948. The route to Lenox Avenue–145th Street became the 3. On January 3, 1955, late-night service between the 145th Street and 96th Street stations was discontinued due to low ridership, and the 145th Street station was closed overnight. The New York City Transit Authority (NYCTA) announced plans in 1956 to add fluorescent lights above the edges of the station's platforms. In 1959, all 3 trains became express.

With the construction of the Harlem–148th Street station inside the Lenox Yard in the 1960s, the 145th Street station was planned to be closed, since the 148th Street station was intended as a direct replacement for the 145th Street station. However, the proposal was shelved due to protests from the local community over the long walk of up to seven blocks to either the new station or 135th Street one stop south, and due to possible congestion issues at 135th Street. The 148th Street station opened on May 13, 1968; despite its name, the new terminal was located at 149th Street. Afterward, all northbound trains continued to 148th Street.

From 1995 to 2008, this station lacked full-time service, as 3 trains did not operate during late nights. Full-time service was restored on July 27, 2008. During late nights, riders could take the M7, the M102, or a shuttle bus to 135th Street. The station was added to the National Register of Historic Places on March 30, 2005, due to its importance as one of the first IRT stations to be built.

Starting on March 2, 1998, the tunnel was reconstructed along with the cracked tunnel floor. This was done to correct a major water problem that had existed for many years due to the presence of the Harlem Creek and other underground streams, which caused extensive flooding, water damage, and seepage problems that occasionally contributed to severe service disruptions. The project cost $82 million and was finished on October 12, 1998. During the reconstruction, 3 trains were rerouted to the 137th Street–City College station on the IRT Broadway–Seventh Avenue Line. Supplemental shuttle bus service connecting to other lines in the area were provided for much of this time.

Under the 2015–2019 Metropolitan Transportation Authority Capital Plan, the station underwent a complete overhaul as part of the Enhanced Station Initiative and was entirely closed for several months. Updates included cellular service, Wi-Fi, USB charging stations, interactive service advisories and maps. In January 2018, the New York City Transit and Bus Committee recommended that Citnalta-Forte receives the $125 million contract for the renovations of 167th and 174th–175th Streets on the IND Concourse Line and 145th Street on the IRT Lenox Avenue Line. However, the MTA Board temporarily deferred the vote for these packages after city representatives refused to vote to award the contracts. The contract was put back for a vote in February, where it was ultimately approved. The subway station was closed for renovations from July 23 to November 28, 2018. Due to the closure, 2018 ridership dropped 41.9% compared to the previous year, from 1,093,045 riders in 2017 to 635,413 riders in 2018.

== Station layout ==
There are two tracks with two short side platforms. The station, served by the 3 train at all times, is between 135th Street to the south and Harlem–148th Street to the north. The station is 348 feet (106 m) long and can fit six-and-a-half 51-foot (16 m) IRT subway cars. Only the first five cars of a train open here because the R62 subway cars used on the 3 service are configured in five-car sets and each must have their doors opened at the same time (selective door operation is used). Before trains on the 3 service were lengthened from nine to ten cars in 2001, only four cars opened their doors at the station. The station is slightly offset under Lenox Avenue, being located closer to the avenue's western curb line.

=== Design ===
The fare control is at platform level, and there is no crossover or crossunder between the platforms. The station agent's booth is located on the southbound platform. The station has mosaic name tablets, some old "145" terra cotta cartouches, and a mosaic replica of a cartouche. There used to be women's and men's restrooms on the southbound platform, as evidenced by stone lintels reading "women" and "men". The central section of the southbound platform widens near the turnstiles.

As with other stations built as part of the original IRT, the station was constructed using a cut-and-cover method. The tunnel is covered by a U-shaped trough that contains utility pipes and wires. This trough contains a foundation of concrete no less than 4 inches (100 mm) thick. The lowest sections of the trough's outer walls are composed of transverse arches 5 feet (1.5 m) wide. Each platform consists of 3-inch-thick (7.6 cm) concrete slabs, beneath which are located drainage basins. Columns between the tracks, placed atop the transverse arches, support the jack-arched concrete station roofs. Unlike in most original IRT stations, the majority of these columns are not built-up I-beams. Along the northern end of the platforms there are dense clusters of I-beam columns, while the remainder of the platform contains circular, cast-iron Doric-style columns spaced every 15 feet (4.6 m). The ceiling is about 15 feet (4.6 m) above platform level; the section of the ceiling north of the fare control area is smooth, and the section south of fare control is composed of segmental vaults supported by the center columns. There is a 1-inch (25 mm) gap between the trough wall and the platform walls, which are made of 4-inch (100 mm)-thick brick covered over by a tiled finish.

The 2018 artwork at this station is Parade, a ceramic and glass artwork by Derek Fordjour. It consists of images depicting the African-American parade tradition of Harlem.

=== Track layout ===
Like the other stations on the original IRT subway, it was initially built for trains shorter in length than the standard eight to ten cars used by the subway. In the 1950s and 1960s, all of the other IRT stations were either lengthened to 10 cars or closed. The 145th Street station was also lengthened slightly to the north: there are no columns between the tracks there, since the site formerly accommodated a track crossover. When 145th Street was planned to be closed in the 1960s, it was deemed unnecessary to further lengthen the platforms. Because it remained open, 145th Street is the only original IRT station besides the 42nd Street Shuttle stations that still cannot accommodate ten-car trains. Approximately 200 feet (61 m) north of the station is a diamond crossover for the approach to the northern terminal of the 3 train at Harlem–148th Street. Approximately 300 feet (91 m) south of the station is the 142nd Street Junction with the IRT White Plains Road Line. A track crossover formerly existed immediately south of the station, and another switch existed immediately north of the original platforms, within the space occupied by the current platform extension.

=== Exits ===
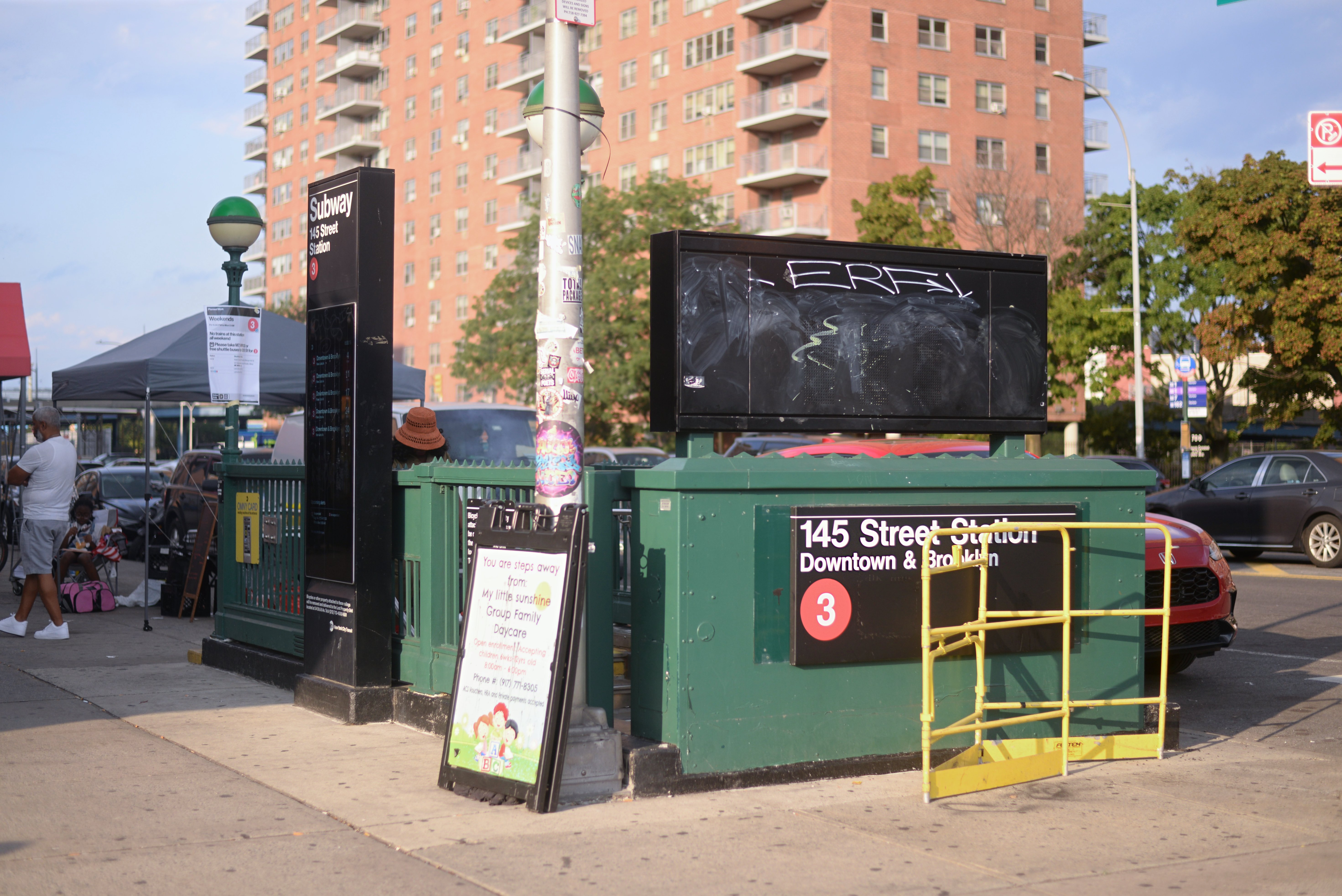
Entrance to the southbound platform at 145th St

Street staircases from platform level go up to all four corners of 145th Street and Lenox Avenue. One street staircase goes to each of the corners; the stairs on the west side of Lenox Avenue serve the southbound platform, while the stairs on the east side are served by the northbound platform. There is no entrance from the street to the northbound platform, as both eastern street staircases contain a high exit-only turnstile and emergency gate. Like the other original IRT stations, this station originally was built with entrances resembling elaborate kiosks, which were removed for reducing sight lines for motorists. The street staircases were replaced with relatively simple, modern steel railings like those seen at most New York City Subway stations.

== See also ==
- National Register of Historic Places listings in Manhattan above 110th Street
