= 137th Street–City College station =

New York City Subway station in Manhattan

137 Street–City College
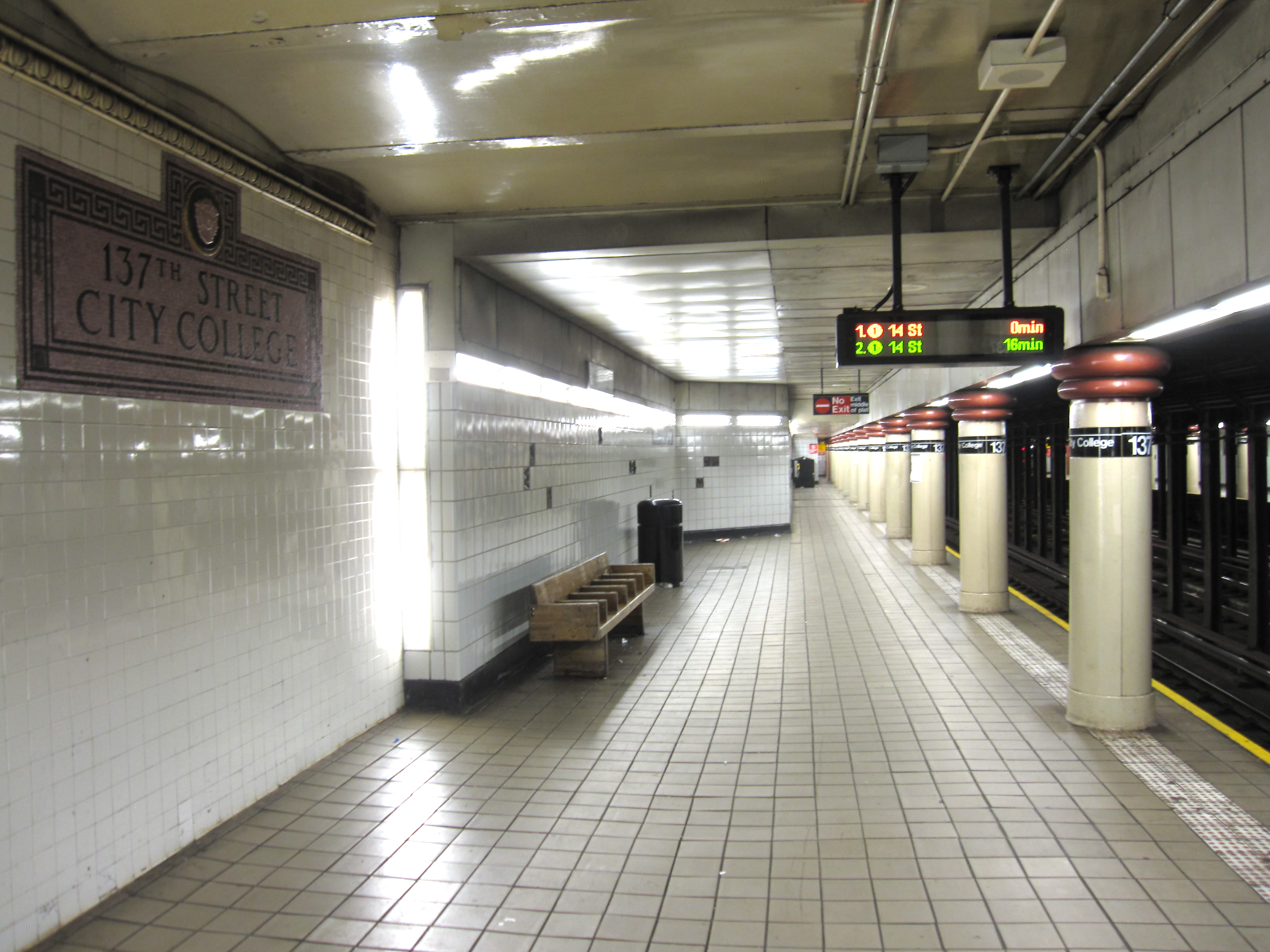
- Southbound platform

Station statistics
- Address: West 137th Street & Broadway; New York, New York
- Borough: Manhattan
- Locale: Hamilton Heights
- Coordinates: 40.821°N 73.954°W
- Division: A (IRT)
- Line: IRT Broadway–Seventh Avenue Line
- Services: 1 (all times)
- Transit: NYCT Bus: M4, M5
- Structure: Underground
- Platforms: 2 side platforms
- Tracks: 3 (2 in regular service)

Other information
- Opened: October 27, 1904 (122 years ago)
- Accessible: Yes

Traffic
- 2025: 2,561,284 ▲6%
- Rank: 141 out of 423
Services
Preceding station	New York City Subway	Following station
145th Street toward Van Cortlandt Park–242nd Street	Local	125th Street toward South Ferry
Location
Location within New York City Subway
Location within New York City
Location within New York
Track layout
Street map
Station service legend
Symbol	Description
Stops all times	Stops all times

The 137th Street–City College station is a local station on the IRT Broadway–Seventh Avenue Line of the New York City Subway. Located at the intersection of 137th Street and Broadway in Hamilton Heights neighborhood of Manhattan, it is served by the 1 train at all times. The station serves the nearby City College of New York and Riverbank State Park.

The 137th Street station was constructed for the Interborough Rapid Transit Company (IRT) as part of the city's first subway line, which was approved in 1900. Construction of the line segment that includes 137th Street began on May 14 of the same year. The station opened on October 27, 1904, as one of the original 28 stations of the New York City Subway. The station's platforms were lengthened in 1948, and the station was renovated in the late 20th century.

The 137th Street station contains two side platforms and three tracks; the center track is not used in regular service. The station was built with tile and mosaic decorations. The platforms contain exits to Broadway's intersection with 137th Street and are not connected to each other within fare control.

== History ==
=== Construction and opening ===
Planning for a subway line in New York City dates to 1864, but development of what became the city's first subway line did not start until 1894, when the New York State Legislature passed the Rapid Transit Act. The subway plans were drawn up by a team of engineers led by William Barclay Parsons, the Rapid Transit Commission's chief engineer. It called for a subway line from New York City Hall in lower Manhattan to the Upper West Side, where two branches would lead north into the Bronx. A plan was formally adopted in 1897, and all legal conflicts over the route alignment were resolved near the end of 1899.

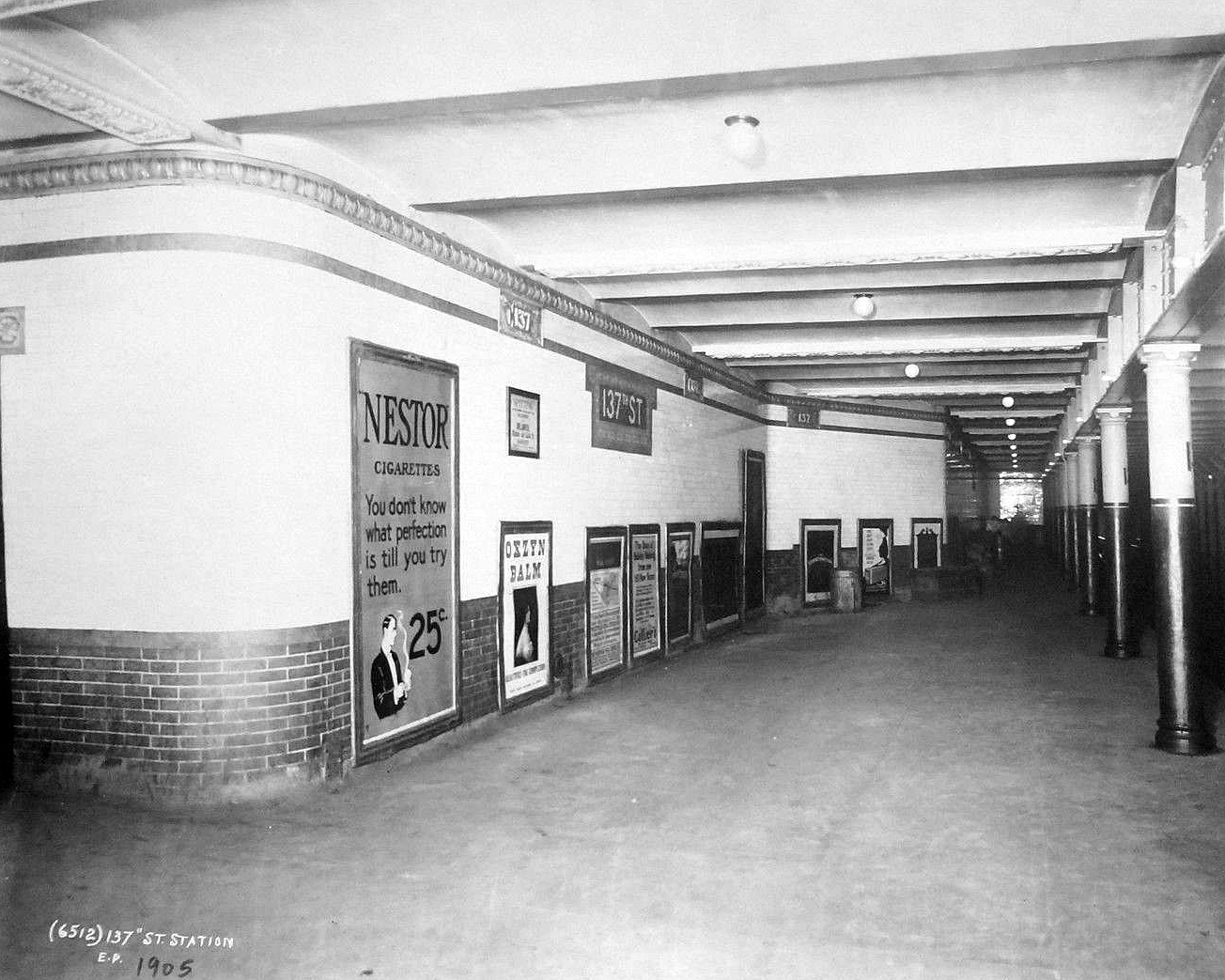
Northbound platform in 1905

The Rapid Transit Construction Company, organized by John B. McDonald and funded by August Belmont Jr., signed the initial Contract 1 with the Rapid Transit Commission in February 1900, under which it would construct the subway and maintain a 50-year operating lease from the opening of the line. In 1901, the firm of Heins & LaFarge was hired to design the underground stations. Belmont incorporated the Interborough Rapid Transit Company (IRT) in April 1902 to operate the subway.

The 137th Street station was constructed as part of the IRT's West Side Line (now the Broadway–Seventh Avenue Line) from 133rd Street to a point 100 feet (30 m) north of 182nd Street. Work on this section was conducted by L. B. McCabe & Brother, who started building the tunnel segment on May 14, 1900. On that date, a groundbreaking ceremony took place at Broadway and 156th Street, one block south of the 157th Street station site. The section of the West Side Line around this station was originally planned as a two-track line, but in early 1901, was changed to a three-track structure to permit train storage in the center track. A third track was added directly north of 96th Street, immediately east of the originally planned two tracks. By late 1903, the subway was nearly complete, but the IRT Powerhouse and the system's electrical substations were still under construction, delaying the system's opening. As late as October 26, 1904, the day before the subway was scheduled to open, the walls and ceilings were incomplete.

The 137th Street station opened on October 27, 1904, as one of the original 28 stations of the New York City Subway from City Hall to 145th Street on the West Side Branch. The opening of the first subway line helped contribute to the development of Morningside Heights and Harlem.

=== Service changes and station renovations ===
After the first subway line was completed in 1908, the station was served by West Side local and express trains. Express trains began at South Ferry in Manhattan or Atlantic Avenue in Brooklyn, and ended at 242nd Street in the Bronx. Local trains ran from City Hall to 242nd Street during rush hours, continuing south from City Hall to South Ferry at other times. In 1918, the Broadway–Seventh Avenue Line opened south of Times Square–42nd Street, and the original line was divided into an H-shaped system. The original subway north of Times Square thus became part of the Broadway–Seventh Avenue Line. Local trains were sent to South Ferry, while express trains used the new Clark Street Tunnel to Brooklyn.

To address overcrowding, in 1909, the New York Public Service Commission proposed lengthening the platforms at stations along the original IRT subway. As part of a modification to the IRT's construction contracts made on January 18, 1910, the company was to lengthen station platforms to accommodate ten-car express and six-car local trains. In addition to $1.5 million (equivalent to $51.8 million in 2025) spent on platform lengthening, $500,000 (equivalent to $17.3 million in 2025) was spent on building additional entrances and exits. It was anticipated that these improvements would increase capacity by 25 percent. The northbound platform at the 137th Street station was extended 150 feet (46 m) to the south, while the southbound platform was not lengthened. Six-car local trains began operating in October 1910, and ten-car express trains began running on the West Side Line on January 24, 1911. Subsequently, the station could accommodate six-car local trains, but ten-car trains could not open some of their doors.

The city government took over the IRT's operations on June 12, 1940. Platforms at IRT Broadway–Seventh Avenue Line stations between 103rd Street and 238th Street, including those at 137th Street, were lengthened to 514 feet (157 m) between 1946 and 1948, allowing full ten-car express trains to stop at these stations. A contract for the platform extensions at 137th Street and eight other stations on the line was awarded to Spencer, White & Prentis Inc. in October 1946, with an estimated cost of $3.891 million. The platform extensions at these stations were opened in stages. On April 6, 1948, the platform extension at 137th Street opened. Simultaneously, the IRT routes were given numbered designations with the introduction of "R-type" rolling stock, which contained rollsigns with numbered designations for each service. The route to 242nd Street became known as the 1. In 1959, all 1 trains became local.

In 1981, the Metropolitan Transportation Authority listed the station among the 69 most deteriorated stations in the subway system. A renovation of the 137th Street station was funded as part of the MTA's 1980–1984 capital plan. The MTA received a $106 million grant from the Urban Mass Transit Administration in October 1983; most of the grant would fund the renovation of eleven stations, including 137th Street. Before Barack Obama became president of the United States, one of his first community organizing efforts after graduating from Columbia University was in conjunction with drawing attention to the poor condition of the station. In 1984 or 1985, Obama, who was working for the New York Public Interest Research Group, was among the leaders of May Day efforts to bring attention to the subway system, particularly the station serving City College. Obama traveled to stations to get people to sign letters addressed to local officials and the MTA. Obama was photographed holding a sign saying "May-Day! May-Day!! Sinking Subway System!"

In April 1988, the New York City Transit Authority (NYCTA) unveiled plans to speed up service on the Broadway–Seventh Avenue Line through the implementation of a skip-stop service: the 9 train. When skip-stop service started in 1989, it was only implemented north of 137th Street–City College on weekdays, and it was the northernmost local stop served by both the 1 and the 9. Skip-stop service ended on May 27, 2005, as a result of a decrease in the number of riders who benefited.

On January 2, 2007, film student Cameron Hollopeter suffered a seizure in the station and fell off the platform onto the tracks. Wesley Autrey saved his life as a train was approaching. Autrey was given numerous awards and prizes, and his two daughters were given a scholarship.

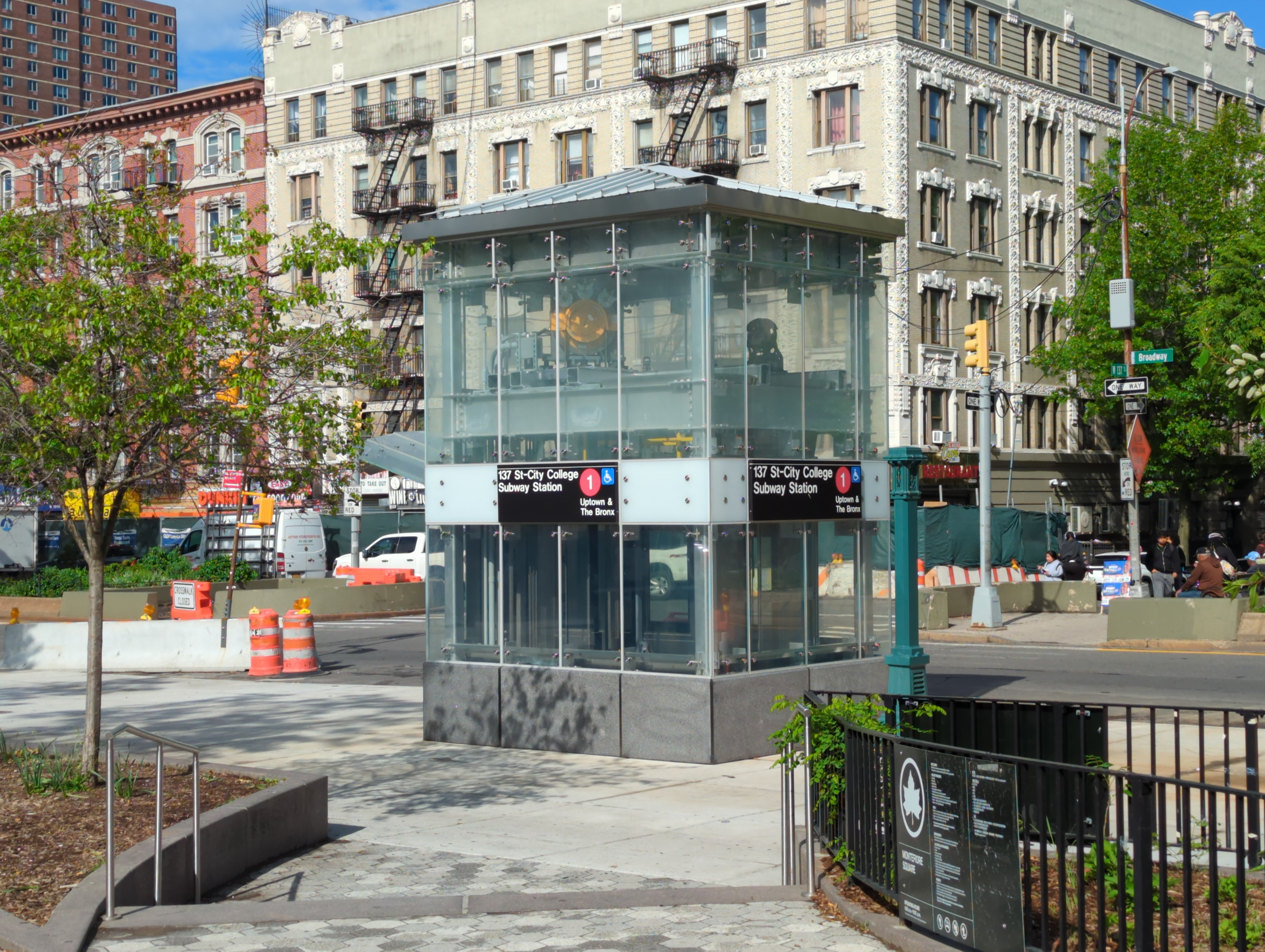
The elevator structure on the northbound side of the station

In 2019, as part of an initiative to increase the accessibility of the New York City Subway system, the MTA announced that it would install elevators at the 137th Street–City College station as part of the MTA's 2020–2024 Capital Program. In December 2022, the MTA announced that it would award a $146 million contract for the installation of eight elevators across four stations, including 137th Street. Construction efforts on the elevator project at 137th Street began in early 2024 and were expected to be completed by March 2025. The accessibility improvements were not completed by October 2025, though plans were made to widen the staircase leading to the uptown platform. An updated release from Shaun Abreu's office indicated that construction on the uptown track access would be finished in January 2026, and the downtown elevator would be in operation by the second quarter of that year. The northbound platform ultimately became accessible in May 2026, followed by the southbound platform that October.

== Station layout ==
This station was part of the original subway, and has two side platforms and three tracks, the center one being an unused express track. The station is served by the 1 at all times and is between 145th Street to the north and 125th Street to the south. The platforms were originally 350 feet (110 m) long, like at other stations north of 96th Street, but as a result of the 1948 platform extension, became 520 feet (160 m) long. The platform extensions are at the southern ends of the original platforms.

=== Design ===
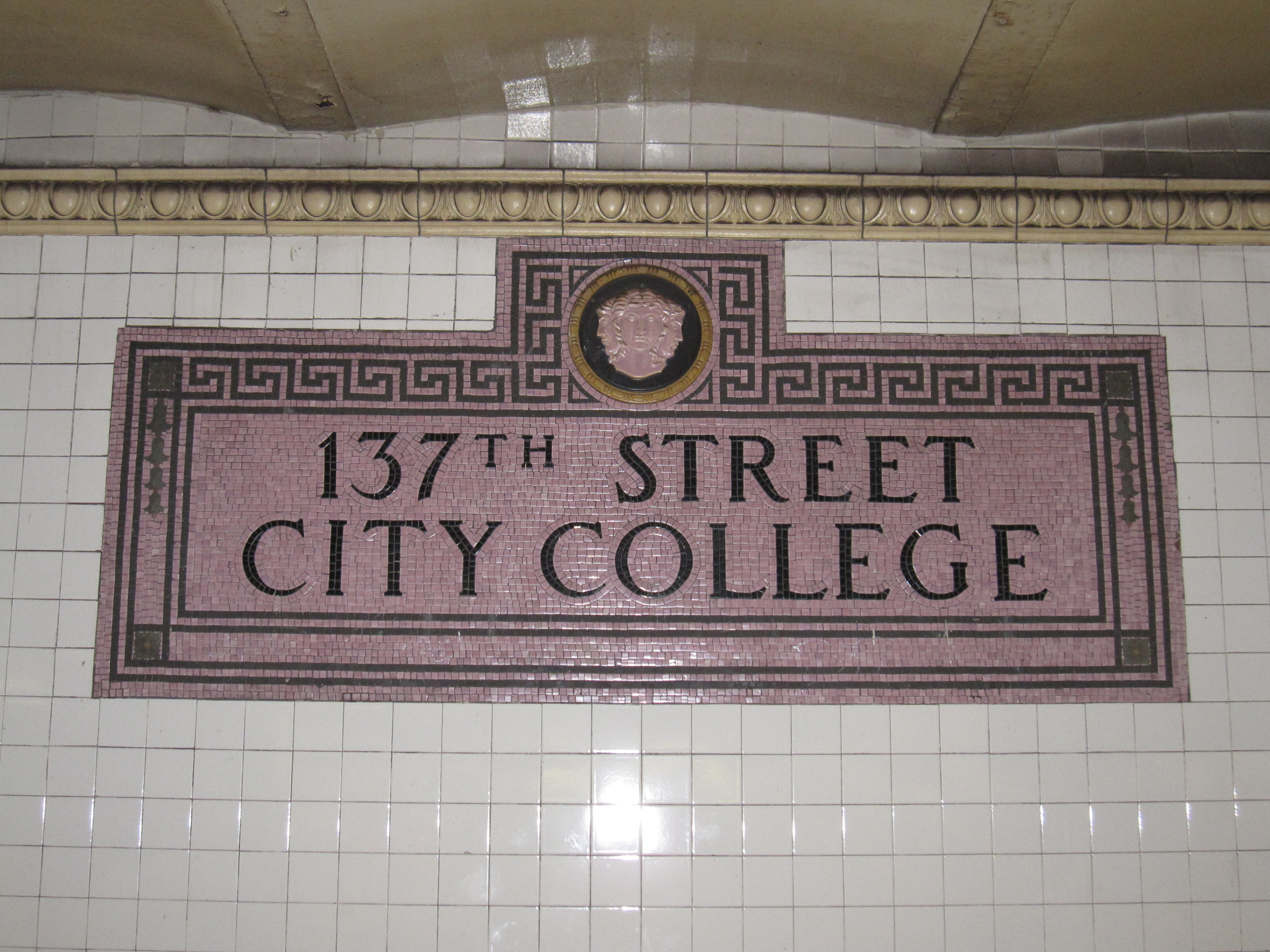
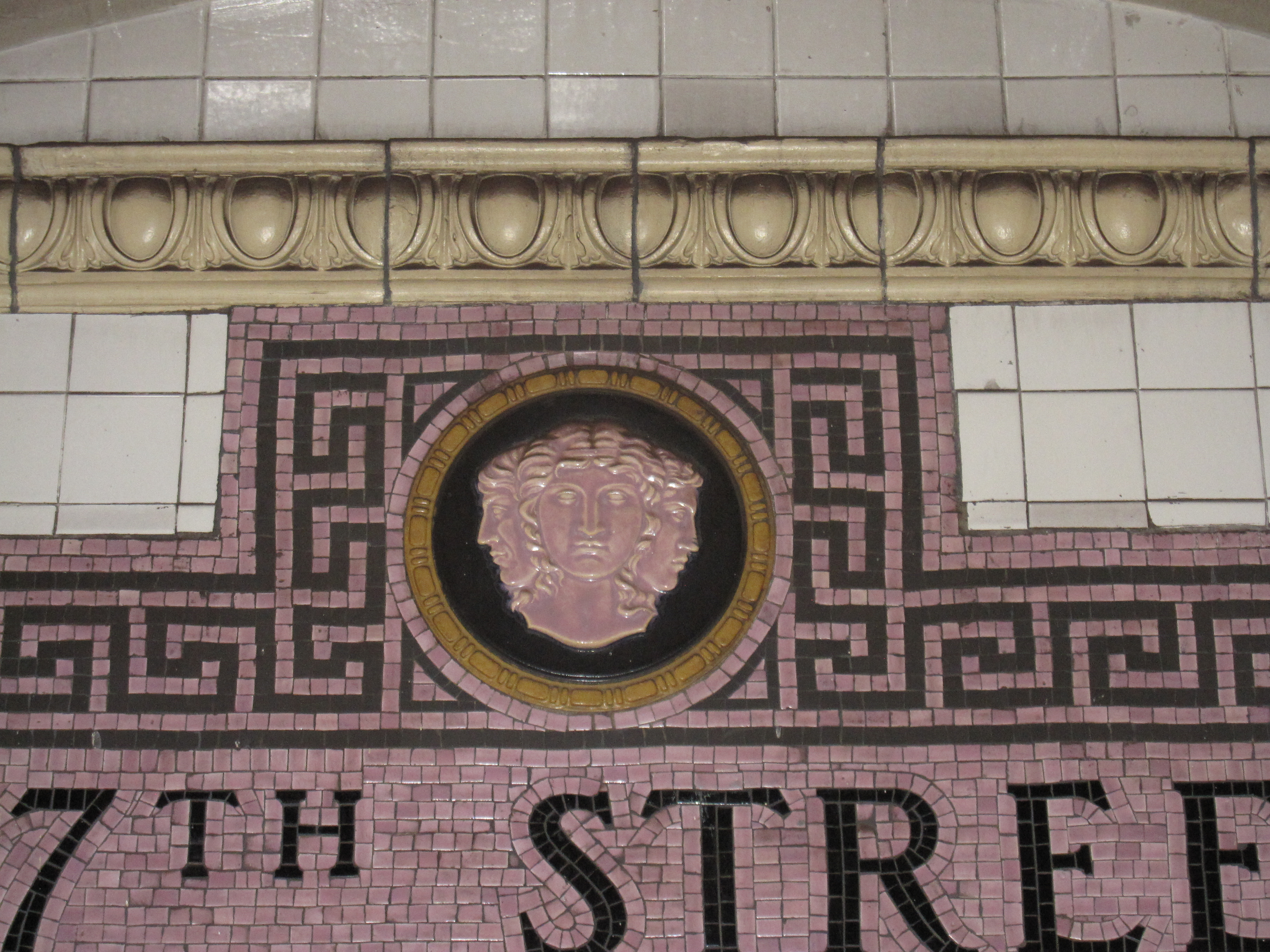
Mosaic by Heins & LaFarge, with detail on three-faced cartouche

As with other stations built as part of the original IRT, the station was constructed using a cut-and-cover method. The tunnel is covered by a U-shaped trough that contains utility pipes and wires. This trough contains a foundation of concrete no less than 4 inches (100 mm) thick. Each platform consists of 3-inch-thick (7.6 cm) concrete slabs, beneath which are drainage basins. The original platforms contained circular, cast-iron Doric-style columns spaced every 15 feet (4.6 m), while the platform extensions contained I-beam columns. Additional columns between the tracks, spaced every 5 feet (1.5 m), support the jack-arched concrete station roofs. There is a 1-inch (25 mm) gap between the trough wall and the platform walls, which are made of 4-inch (100 mm)-thick brick covered over by a tiled finish. The columns have been overlaid with heavy brick blocks.

The decorative scheme consists of silver and blue tile tablets (which may not have been original to the station design); white tile bands; a buff terracotta cornice; and green terracotta plaques. The mosaic tiles at all original IRT stations were manufactured by the American Encaustic Tile Company, which subcontracted the installations at each station. The decorative work was performed by tile contractor Manhattan Glass Tile Company and terracotta contractor Atlantic Terra Cotta Company. The mosaics are in pink and black. The ceramic cartouche is also in pink and shows a three-faced figure. The three faces represent "Respice", "Adspice", and "Prospice", and are an emblem of the nearby City College.

Numerous bronze relief tiles are placed within the station's tile walls as part of Steve Wood's 1988 art installation Fossils. The tiles are present on the walls of both platforms and depict various life forms, such as starfish.

=== Track layout ===
In the past, 137th Street was sometimes used as a terminal station. There are switches north of the station that allow northbound trains to enter the underground 137th Street Yard, then return to the other side of the station for the next trip south. The center express track that passes through the station is currently unused in revenue service.

Just south of the station, the tracks emerge onto the Manhattan Valley Viaduct. The line is elevated at 125th Street, and then underground once again at 116th Street–Columbia University, allowing trains to maintain a relatively level grade while passing through highly uneven terrain.

=== Exits ===
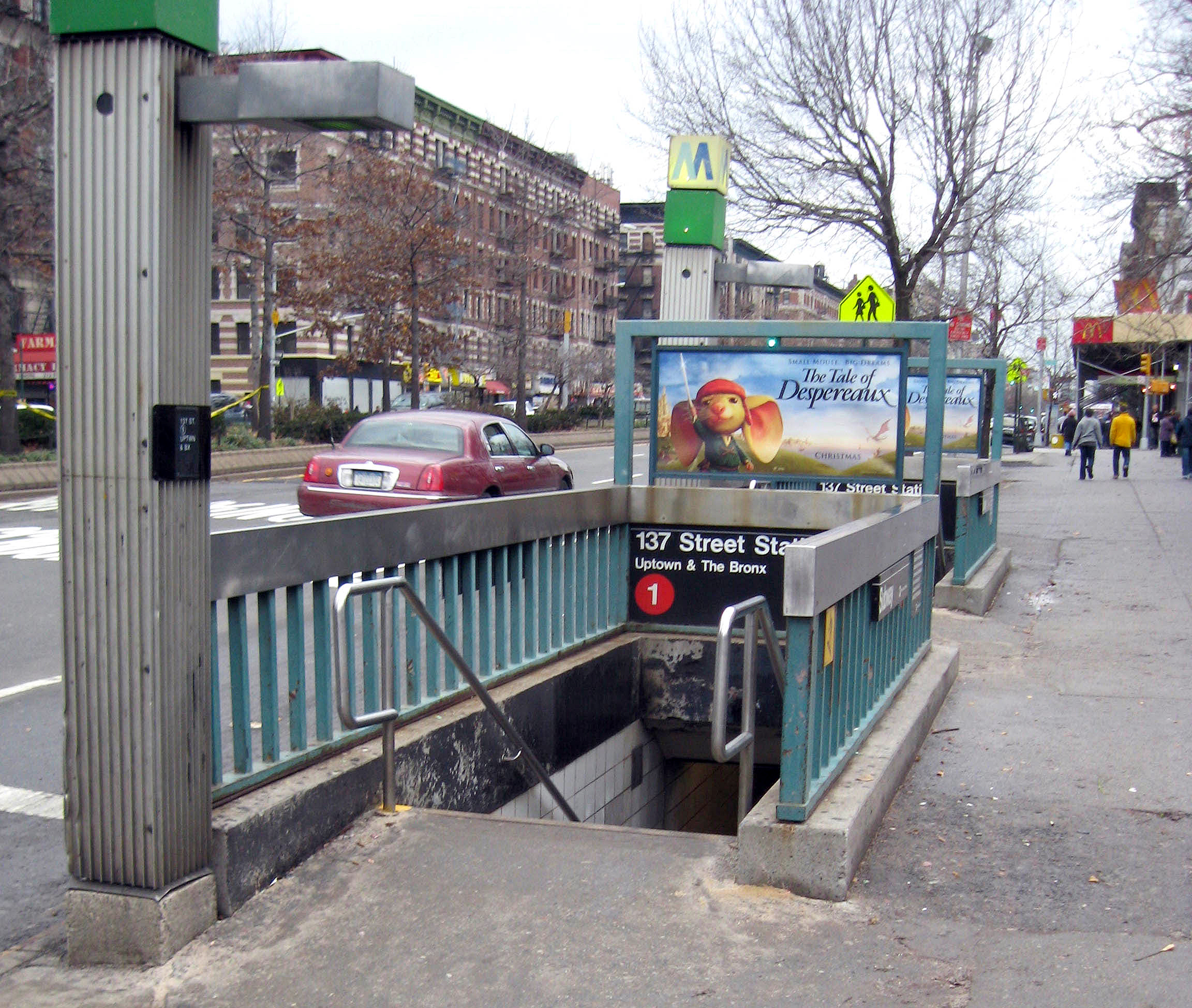
Street stairs to the northbound platform prior to their replacement after elevator installation

Both platforms have same-level fare control containing a bank of turnstiles and staircases to the street. The northbound platform has one wide staircase and an elevator on the northeast corner of Broadway and West 137th Street, which is frequently passed through by City College of New York students leaving the station, and the southbound platform has a token booth and one staircase each leading up to the northwestern and southwestern corner of Broadway and West 137th Street. An elevator to the southbound platform sits right next to the latter staircase. There are no crossovers or crossunders to allow transfers between directions.
