= John B. McDonald =

American contractor (1844–1911)

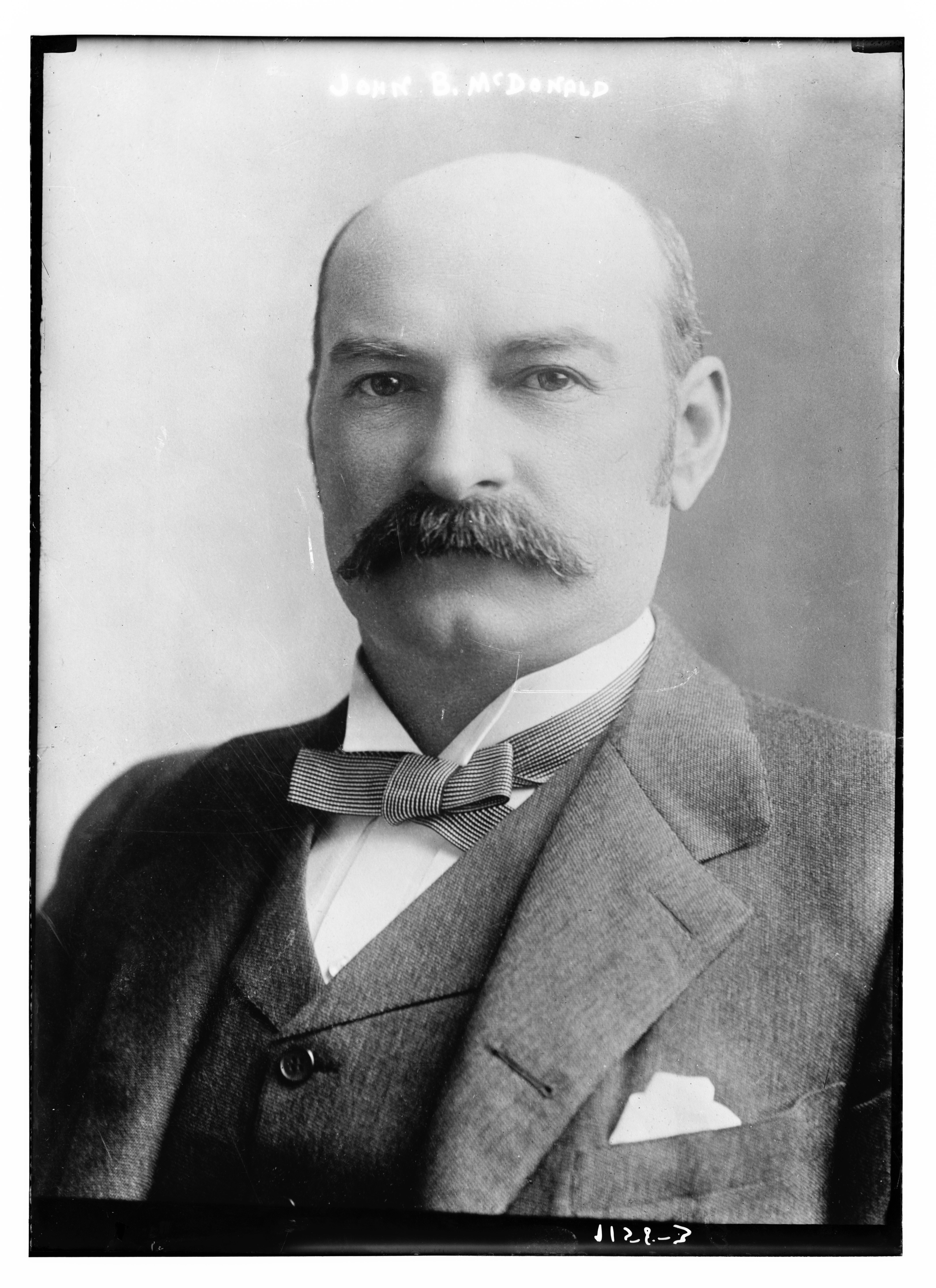
- McDonald, c. 1900
- Born: November 7, 1844; Cork, Ireland
- Died: March 17, 1911 (aged 66); New York City, New York, U.S.
- Resting place: Hopewell, New York, U.S.
- Occupation: Contractor
- Spouse: Georgia A. Strang (m. 1869)

John B. McDonald (November 7, 1844 – March 17, 1911) was an Irish-born contractor who is best known for overseeing construction of New York City's first subway line from 1900 to 1904.

== Early life ==
John B. McDonald was born on November 7, 1844, in Cork, Ireland to Bartholomew McDonald, a contractor and cellar digger. At a young age, he came to New York City and attended public schools. His father became served as a representative in the New York City Board of Aldermen.

== Career ==
From 1900 to 1904, McDonald oversaw the construction of the first New York City Subway line. McDonald won the job with a $35 million bid in 1900, but he did not have the capital necessary to post the surety bonds the city required, so he turned to the banker August Belmont Jr., for financial backing. After that, McDonald effectively worked for the company that Belmont formed, the Interborough Rapid Transit Company, but McDonald was credited with being an extremely able builder. The initial segment from City Hall to Grand Central, across 42nd Street to Times Square, and up Broadway to 145th Street—was completed on schedule on October 27, 1904. It was a remarkable achievement given the complexity and novelty of the project and periodic labor turmoil.

In 1905, McDonald was hired away by a rival transit mogul, Thomas Fortune Ryan, who proposed to build a competing subway line. Ryan agreed to pay McDonald $250,000 in two installments up front plus $50,000 a year for five years not to be involved in construction for any company other than the Metropolitan Street Railway Company, Ryan's company. By the time McDonald testified to the arrangement in 1907, Ryan and Belmont had merged their companies.

Before the subway, McDonald had made a name for himself on other rail projects, including a challenging project in the early 1890s tunneling underneath downtown Baltimore to bring the Baltimore & Ohio Railroad to the Baltimore Harbor. The so-called Howard Street Tunnel is still in use by freight trains. He also worked on the San Francisco Harbor, the Canadian Pacific Railway, the Entre Ríos Railway in South America, the Northwestern Elevated Railroad in Chicago, a bridge in Montreal and a tunnel in Hamilton, Ontario.

== Personal life ==
McDonald married Georgia A. Strang in 1869. They had daughters together. He had a son, but he died in the late 1800s. He died in New York City on March 17, 1911. He was interred at his home in Hopewell, New York.
