= Rocking the Boat =

American non-profit organization

- Formation: established 1996
- Founder: Adam Green
- Type: Nonprofit
- Legal status: 501(c)3
- Purpose: Empowerment of young people in the South Bronx
- Headquarters: New York
- Coordinates: 40.8181°N 73.8831°W
- Website: https://rockingtheboat.org

Rocking the Boat is a non-profit organization under 501(c)(3) in The Bronx, New York City. They run educational programs for high school students, teaching boat building, environmental science, and sailing, with the goal of empowering economically disadvantaged young people in the South Bronx. An annual fund-raising event features rowing around Manhattan.

== History and activities ==
Rocking the Boat was founded in 1996 by Adam Green, and is a non-profit organization in the South Bronx which runs STEM-based educational programs for local high school students. They are most well known for boatbuilding, but curricula also include environmental science and sailing. Their motto is, "Kids don’t just build boats, boats build kids".

Originally located in an East Harlem junior high school, the group's first project was to build an 8 foot (2.4 m) wooden dinghy, with the school's indoor swimming pool serving as a testing tank. The organization is currently located in a converted warehouse on Edgewater Road in the Hunts Point section of The Bronx, adjacent to Hunts Point Riverside Park on the Bronx River.

As part of their environmental programs, Rocking the Boat does water quality testing in the Bronx River, measuring pathogen levels. In 2002, Rocking the Boat worked with New York City Parks and The Bronx River Alliance to plant Spartina alterniflora (salt-marsh grass) along the shore of the Bronx River.

== Students ==
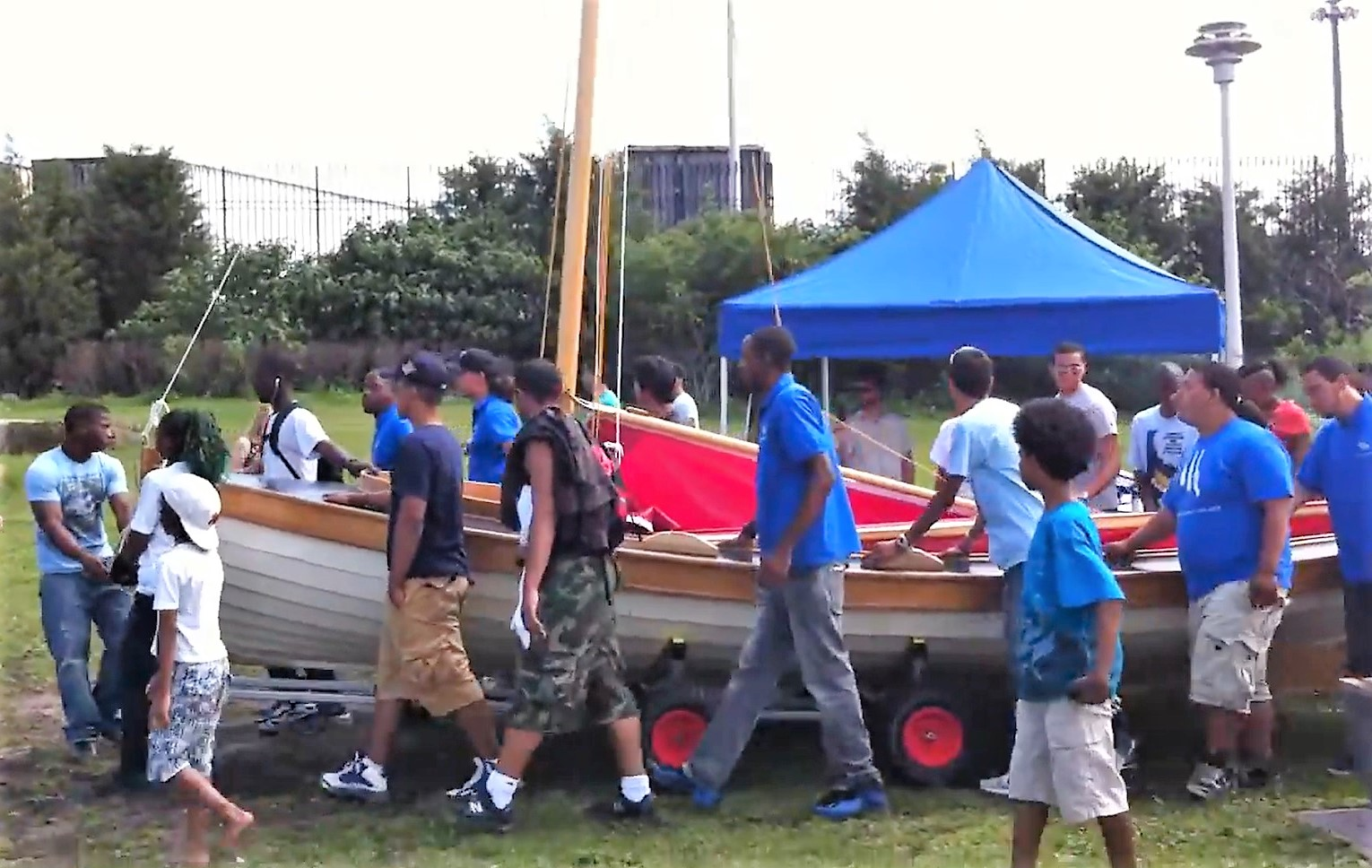
The 2011 class of Rocking the Boat launches the boat they built, "The Legacy".

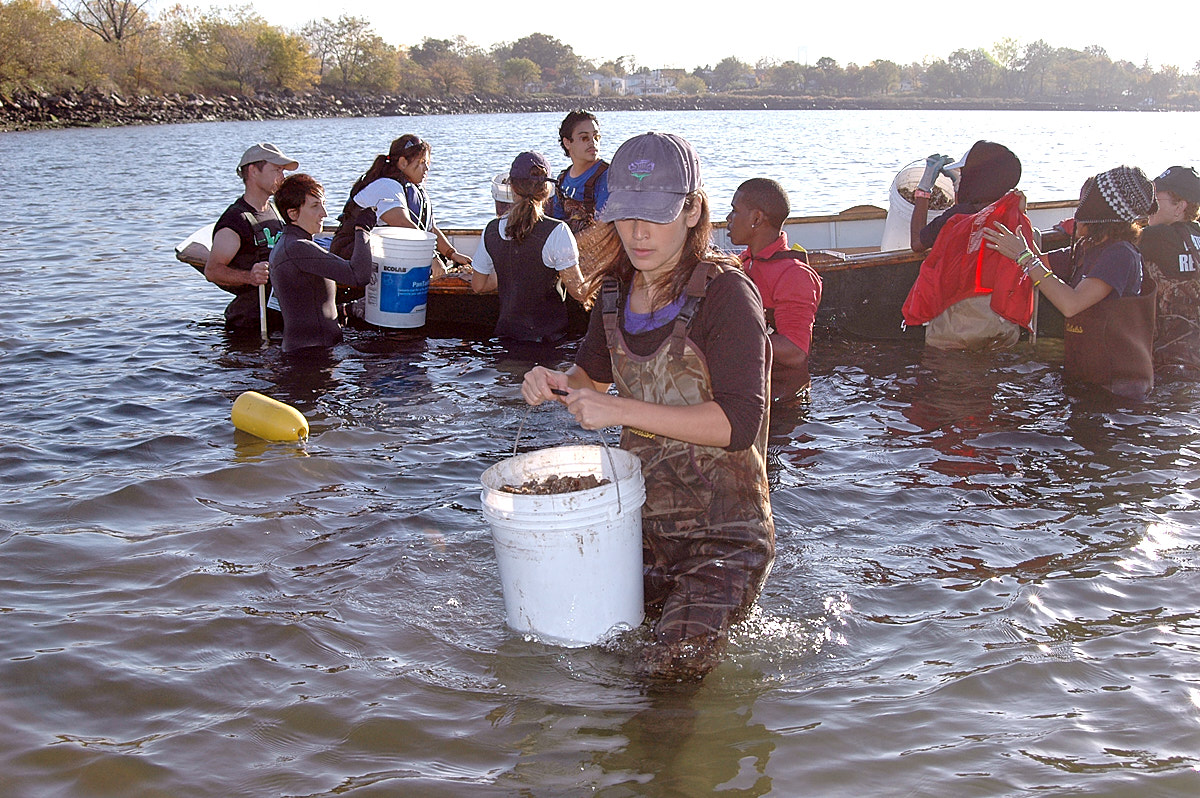
Rocking the Boat students assist in creation of artificial oyster reef off Soundview Park.

Rocking the Boat draws students mostly from the surrounding Hunts Point neighborhood, in the lowest income congressional district in the country. Green told the Daily News, "Rocking the Boat empowers young people challenged by severe economic, educational and social conditions to develop the self-confidence to set ambitious goals and gain the skills necessary to achieve".

As of 2019, approximately 850 students had graduated the organization's educational programs.

== Rocking Manhattan ==
Rocking the Boat runs an annual fundraising event, known as Rocking Manhattan, in which participants row wooden Whitehall rowing gigs around the island of Manhattan. The 30-mile (48 km), 8-hour course starts at Pier 40 on West Houston Street, circumnavigating the island via the East River, the Harlem River, and the Hudson River. Recent events have included 12 boats and over 100 rowers.
