= Rocking the boat =

Rocking the boat may be:

- Abilene paradox
- Rocking the Boat, a non-profit organization
- Rocking the Boat (documentary), a 2016 film
