= Bronx Community Board 2 =

Bronx Community District 2 Bronx Community Board 2
- Community District
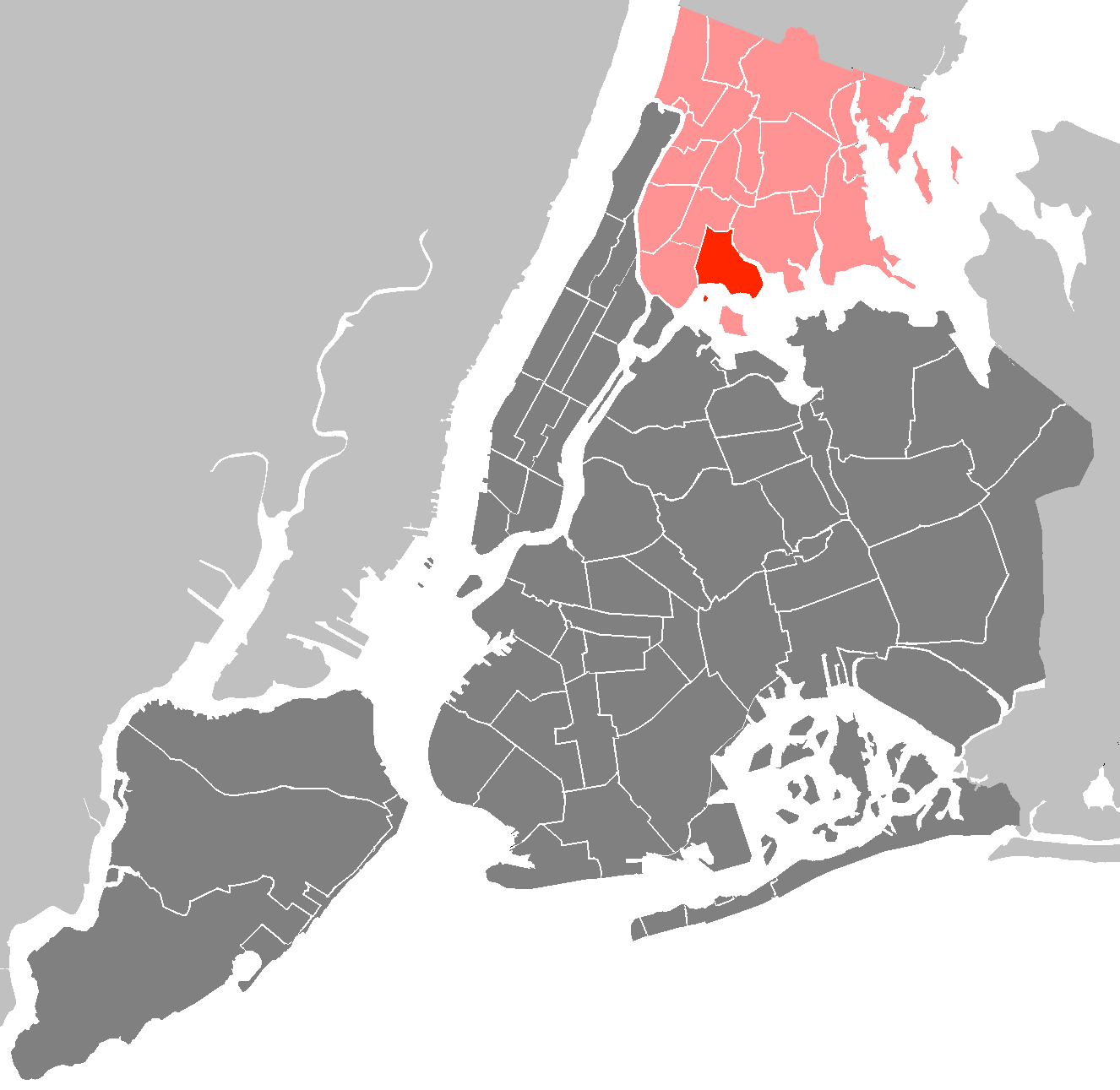
- Location in The Bronx
- Country: United States
- State: New York
- City: New York City
- Borough: The Bronx
- Neighborhoods: list: Hunts Point; Longwood

Government
  - Type: Community board
  - Body: Bronx Community Board 2
  - Chairperson: Robert Crespo
  - District Manager: Raphael Acevedo

Area
  - Total: 2.2 sq mi (5.7 km^{2})

Population (2010)
  - Total: 52,200
  - Density: 24,000/sq mi (9,200/km^{2})

Ethnicity
  - Hispanic and Latino Americans: 67.5%
  - African-American: 28.7%
  - White: 1.9%
  - Asian: 0.6%
  - Others: 1.2%
- Time zone: UTC−5 (Eastern)
  - Summer (DST): UTC−4 (EDT)
- ZIP codes: 10455, 10459, and 10474
- Area codes: 718, 347, and 929, and 917
- Police Precincts: 41st (website)
- Website: bxcb2.org

Bronx Community Board 2 is a local government unit of the city of New York, encompassing the neighborhoods of Hunts Point and Longwood in the borough of the Bronx. It is delimited by the Bronx River on the east, Westchester Avenue, East 167th Street, and East 169th Street on the north, Prospect Avenue and East 149th Street to the west, and the East River on the south.

== Community board staff and membership ==
The current chairperson of the Bronx Community board 2 is Ian Amritt. Its District Manager is Ralph Acevedo. Both are long-time Community Board 2 residents.

The City Council members representing the community district are non-voting, ex officio board members. The council members and their council districts are:

- 8th NYC Council District - Diana Ayala
- 17th NYC Council District - Rafael Salamanca

== Demographics ==
As of the United States 2000 Census, the Community Board has a population of 46,824, up from 39,433 in 1990 and 34,397 in 1980. Of them, 35,507 (75.8%) are of Hispanic origin, 10,021 (21.4%) are Black, non-Hispanic, 582 (1.2%) are White, non-Hispanic, 207 (0.4%) are Asian or Pacific Islander, 101 (0.2%) American Indian or Alaska Native, 90 (0.2%) are some other race (non-Hispanic), and 316 (0.7%) of two or more races (non-Hispanic).
