= Longwood, Bronx =

Neighborhood in New York City

Longwood
- Neighborhood of the Bronx
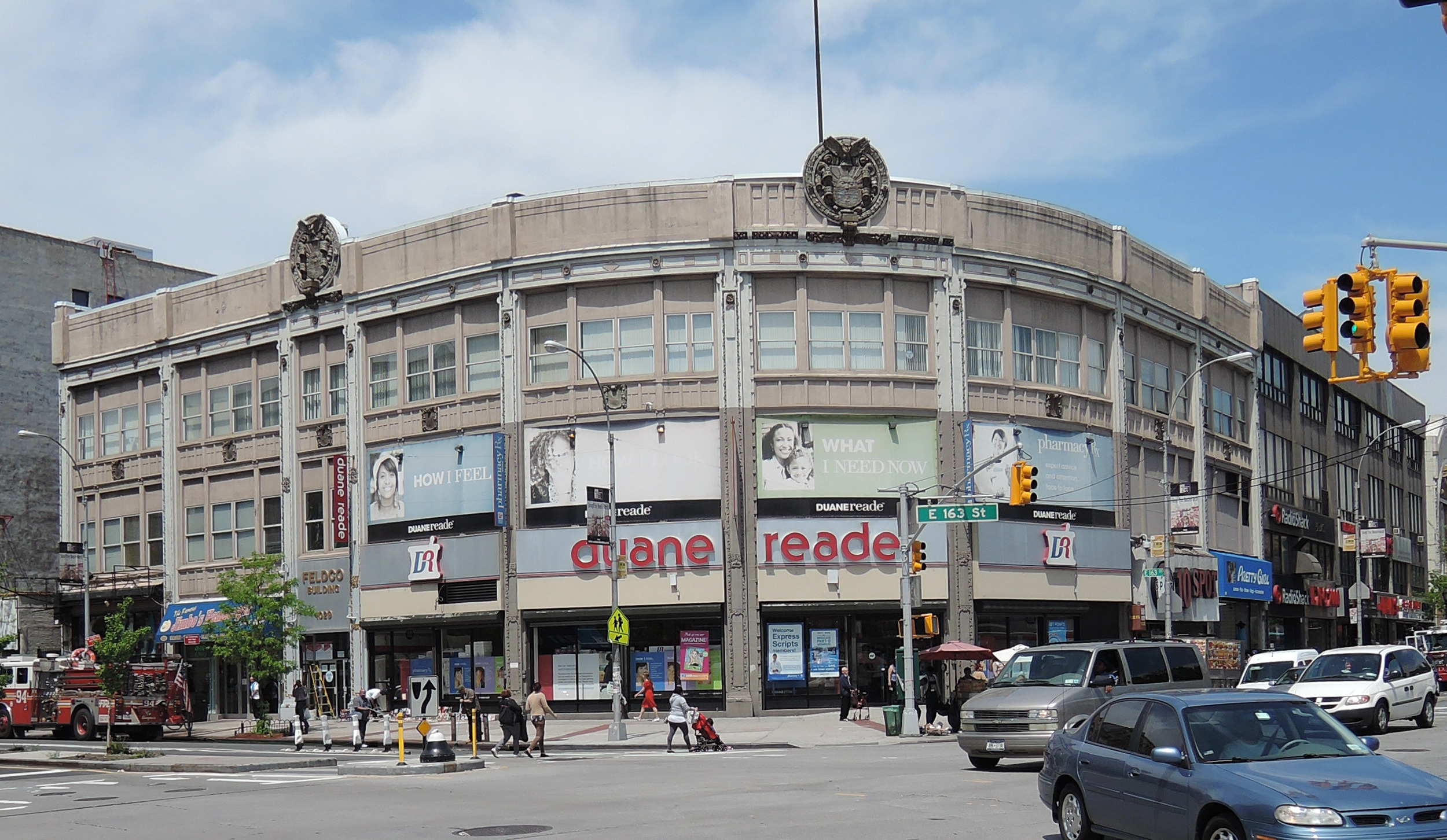
- Southern Boulevard in Longwood
- Interactive map of Longwood
- Coordinates: 40.816°N 73.899°W
- Country: United States
- State: New York
- City: New York City
- Borough: Bronx
- Community District: Bronx 2

Area
  - Total: 0.489 sq mi (1.27 km^{2})

Population (2010)
  - Total: 26,196
  - Density: 53,600/sq mi (20,700/km^{2})

Economics
  - Median income: $32,860

Ethnicity
  - Hispanic and Latino Americans: 67.9%
  - African-American: 27.2%
  - White: 2.2%
  - Asian: 0.4%
- ZIP Codes: 10455, 10459
- Area code: 718, 347, 929, and 917

Longwood is a mixed-use neighborhood in the southeast Bronx in New York City. Its boundaries, starting from the north and moving clockwise are East 167th Street to the north, the Bronx River and the Bruckner Expressway to east, East 149th Street to the south, and Saint Anns Avenue to the west. Southern Boulevard is the primary thoroughfare through Longwood.

The neighborhood is part of Bronx Community District 2, and its ZIP Codes include 10455 and 10459. The neighborhood is served by the New York City Police Department's 41st Precinct. NYCHA property in the area is patrolled by P.S.A. 7 at 737 Melrose Avenue in the Melrose section of the Bronx. The local subway, the 6 and <6> trains, operates along Southern Boulevard.

== History ==
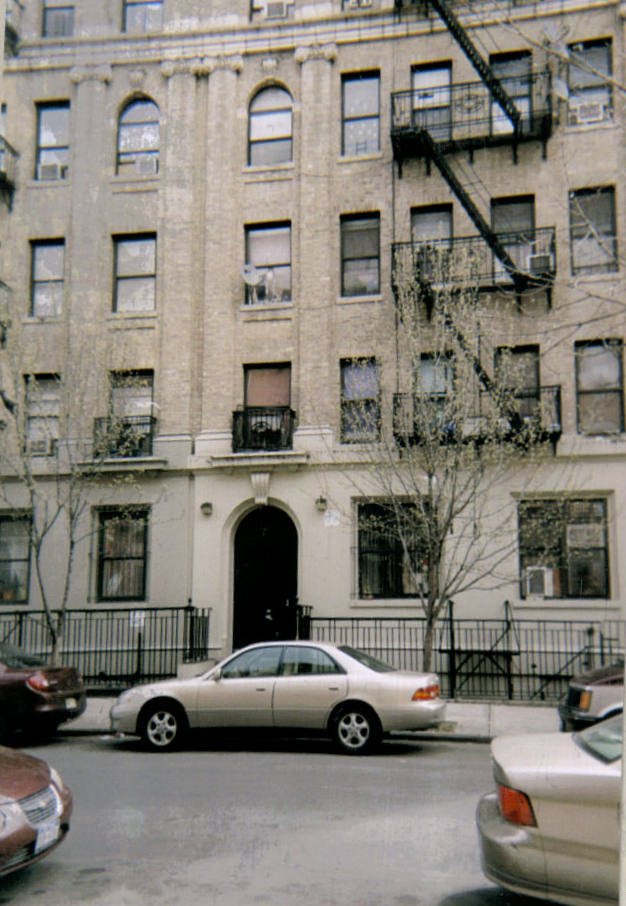
976 Simpson Street was built in 1909. It is near the former "Fort Apache" precinct house

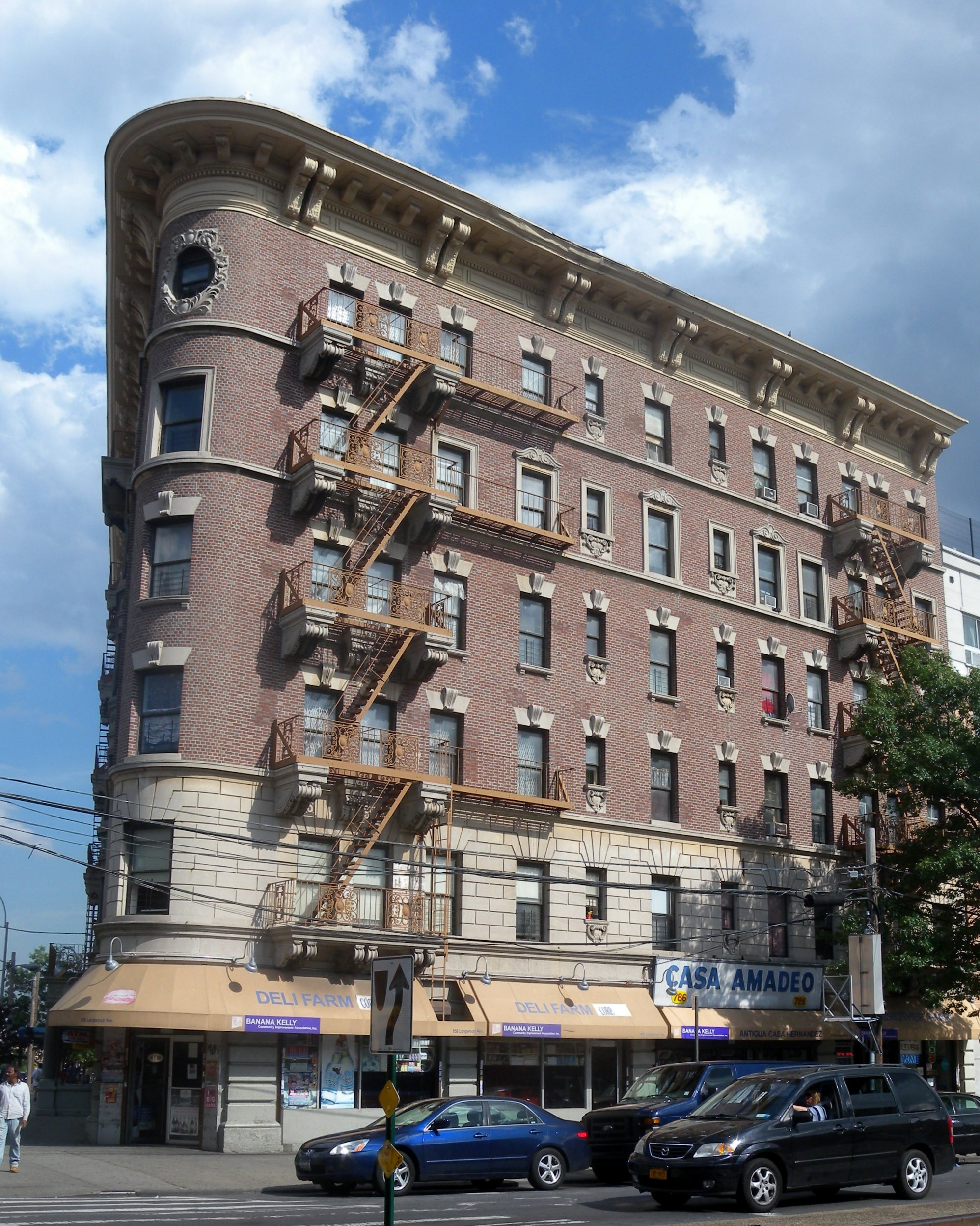
Casa Amadeo, antigua Casa Hernandez, a historic landmark and music store

The Bronx initially began to urbanize with the construction of a streetcar network. Eventually, the expansion of the elevated and subterranean rapid transit lines from Manhattan rapidly accelerated development. Solid rows of 5 and 6 story, walk-up and larger elevator, apartment buildings were built to the sidewalk and dominated the landscape of Upper Manhattan, the West Bronx and in walking proximity of the elevated lines in the East Bronx. Commercial corridors quickly developed in close proximity to rapid transit stations and primary thoroughfares. Early in this construction boom, Longwood was one of the most dense and developed Bronx neighborhoods. For much of the first half of the 20th century, the Bronx was overall home to a predominantly middle-class population of European and Jewish descent hailing from diverse nationalities, including immigrants directly from the corresponding countries of varying socioeconomic statuses.

Beginning in the 1950s, the older, more developed parts of the Bronx experienced a socioeconomic shift due to a number of factors. The construction of the Cross Bronx Expressway displaced thousands and physically divided communities, Co-op City in the northeast Bronx offered modern amenities and spacious apartments, and suburban communities outside New York City became more appealing with their auto-centric lifestyle. As people with financial means began to leave, impoverished people often replaced them. White flight and abandonment only accelerated over time. By the late 1970s, many buildings in the greater South Bronx had been burnt out in an epidemic wave of arson. Scammers realized they could manipulate the system and collect insurance money after more lucrative tenants had fled. The area was severely run down as the community became increasingly disfranchised. At this time, crime reached such a level that the 41st Precinct building at 1086 Simpson Street became known by the police as "Fort Apache".

The wave of arson eventually ended with the help of community groups such as Banana Kelly CIA, Inc. and SEBCO (South East Bronx Community Organization), who worked to bring recognition and protect the remaining apartment buildings in the greater South Bronx. What was left was a wasteland of abandoned buildings, vacant lots, filthy streets and a severe lack of even basic commercial amenities. During this period of time, the neighborhood was dealt another blow as violent crime hit historic highs during the crack epidemic. The police seemed to be fighting a losing battle as many young men in New York City were killed on the streets over drug turf. The greater South Bronx was one of the hardest hit areas, with a largely poor population which lacked local jobs, many began to turn to the lucrative drug trade.

Some of the first federal funding in decades for new investment began in 1986 under the Ed Koch administration. In blighted neighborhoods across the city, various housing experiments were attempted. The NYCHA was one of the first agencies to create and renovate residential units in Longwood, the city soon followed up with independent, locally driven developments. This construction resulted in escalating reinvestment in these communities Continuing into the mid-1990s, local and federal governments invested over $550 million in new subsidized residential housing and the expansion of businesses and commerce. This period saw the construction of the South Bronx headquarters of the Police Athletic League of New York City and the relocation of the 41st Precinct of the NYPD from Simpson Street to Longwood Avenue. In addition, investments were made to the Banana Kelly High School, and to several small and large businesses. This investment has only increased exponentially since that time. A vast number of new housing and commercial units have been constructed on formally vacant lots, with more planned. A community once dominated by blight and disinvestment, is now towered over by modern apartment buildings, renovated pre-war structures, and rows of attached row houses. Social problems persist due to a significant percentage of the population living in poverty. Crime, for instance, has declined versus historic highs in the 1990s, but once remained significantly above average for New York City. Nonetheless, the neighborhood remains a symbol of significant social and economic improvement.

== Demographics ==
The neighborhood predominantly consists of Latin Americans (Longwood has one of the highest concentrations of Puerto Ricans in New York City) but includes a small yet diverse mix of races, ethnic groups, religious affiliations, sexual orientations, and national origins. Like most neighborhoods in New York City, the vast majority of households are renter occupied. Almost half of the population lives below the federal poverty line and receives public assistance (AFDC, Home Relief, Supplemental Security Income, and Medicaid). This community was once part of New York's 16th congressional district, the poorest such district in the United States. After redistricting, it is now part of New York's 15th congressional district and no longer the poorest district in the United States. There is significant income diversity on a block by block basis.

Based on data from the 2010 United States census, the population of Longwood was 26,196, an increase of 3,114 (13.5%) from the 23,082 counted in 2000. Covering an area of 246.55 acres (99.78 ha), the neighborhood had a population density of 106.3 inhabitants per acre (68,000/sq mi; 26,300/km^{2}).

The racial makeup of the neighborhood was 1.5% (382) White, 22.4% (5,866) African American, 0.1% (32) Native American, 0.5% (135) Asian, 0.0% (9) Pacific Islander, 0.3% (78) from other races, and 0.6% (163) from two or more races. Hispanic or Latino of any race were 74.6% (19,531) of the population.

The entirety of Community District 2, which comprises Longwood and Hunts Point, had 56,144 inhabitants as of NYC Health's 2018 Community Health Profile, with an average life expectancy of 78.9 years. This is lower than the median life expectancy of 81.2 for all New York City neighborhoods. Most inhabitants are youth and middle-aged adults: 28% are between the ages of between 0–17, 29% between 25 and 44, and 21% between 45 and 64. The ratio of college-aged and elderly residents was lower, at 12% and 10% respectively.

As of 2017, the median household income in Community Districts 1 and 2, including Melrose and Mott Haven, was $20,966. In 2018, an estimated 29% of Longwood and Hunts Point residents lived in poverty, compared to 25% in all of the Bronx and 20% in all of New York City. One in eight residents (12%) were unemployed, compared to 13% in the Bronx and 9% in New York City. Rent burden, or the percentage of residents who have difficulty paying their rent, is 58% in Longwood and Hunts Point, compared to the boroughwide and citywide rates of 58% and 51% respectively. Based on this calculation, as of 2018, Longwood and Hunts Point are gentrifying.

== Land use and terrain ==
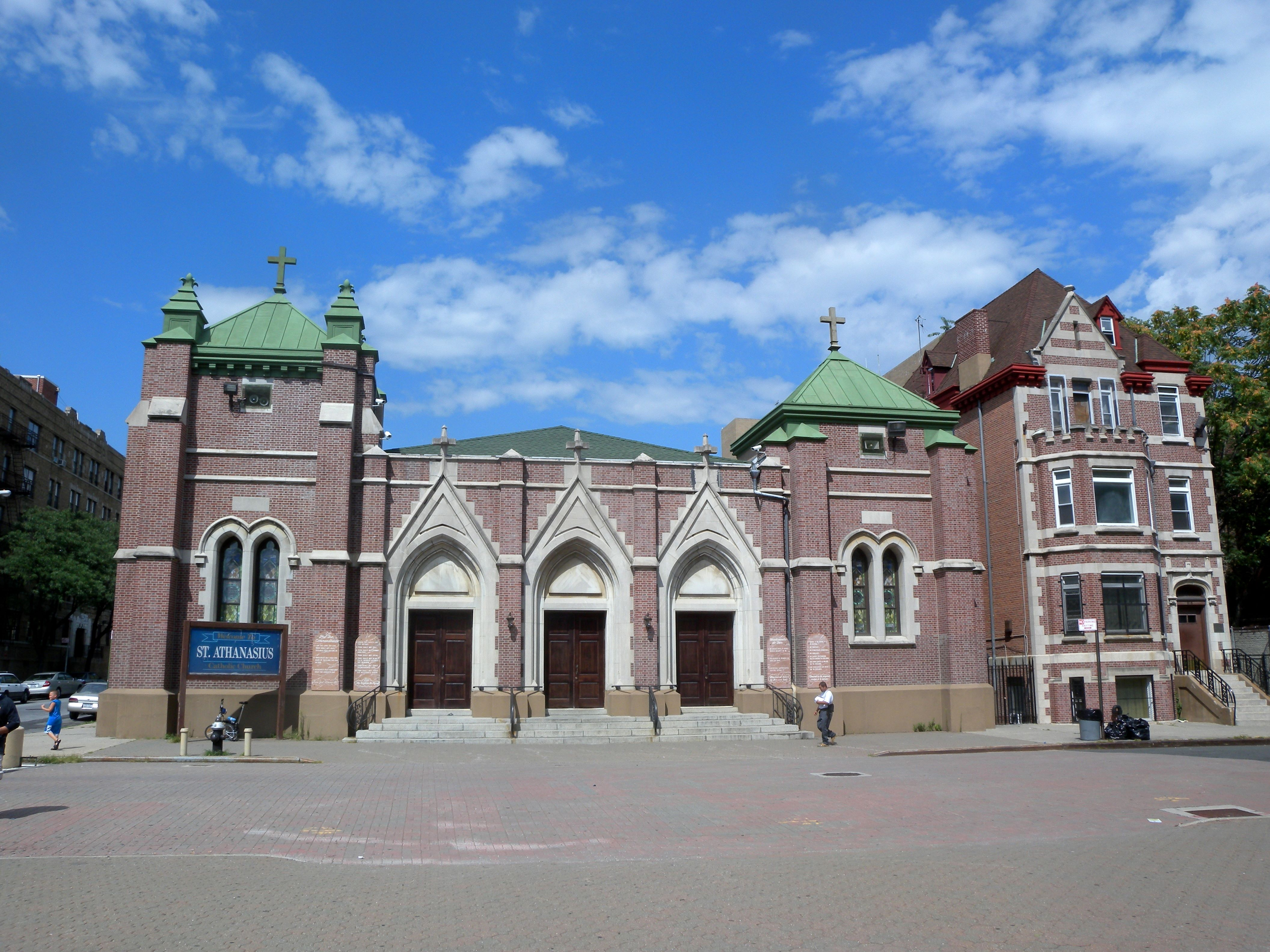
Looking north across Tiffany Street at St. Athanasius Roman Catholic Church

Longwood is dominated by pre-war, 5- and 6-story apartment buildings. Starting in the 1990s, a construction boom has resulted in a number of modern apartment buildings and row houses. Much of the original housing stock was structurally damaged by arson and eventually razed by the city between mid and late 1980s.

The total land area is roughly 0.5 square miles (1.3 km^{2}). The terrain is somewhat hilly.

=== Southern Boulevard Business Improvement District ===
Southern Boulevard is a long-standing, mixed-use district. The Southern Boulevard Business Improvement District, formed in 2008, sits between the two points of closest proximity for the IRT Pelham and White Plains Road Lines. Other primary thoroughfares contain amenities like supermarkets, pharmacies, barbershops, hair salons, fast food, bodegas, and cheap shops.

=== The Crossings ===
The Crossings is a two-level 40,000-square-foot (3,700 m^{2}) mall at the intersection of Hunts Point Avenue and Bruckner Boulevard. Initially, the project included a residential component, but was quickly scrapped, much to the dismay of the community.

=== Longwood Historic District ===
The landmarked Longwood Historic District is located south of Longwood Avenue along Beck, Kelly, Dawson Streets and Hewitt Place. The district largely consists of semi-detached row houses, most of which were designed by one architect, Warren C. Dickerson.

=== Low-income public housing projects ===
There are four NYCHA developments located in Longwood.

1. West Farms Square Rehab; four rehabilitated tenement buildings, 6 stories tall
2. East 165th Street-Bryant Avenue; five buildings, 3 stories tall
3. Longfellow Avenue Rehab; two 5-story rehabilitated tenement buildings
4. Stebbins Avenue-Hewitt Place; two 3-story buildings

== Media ==
In 2006, an online news outlet The Hunts Point Express began reporting on Hunts Point and Longwood. It is written by students at Hunter College, edited by journalism professor Bernard L. Stein, and also appears in a print edition that is available for free at community centers, clinics, and stores throughout the neighborhood.

== Police and crime ==
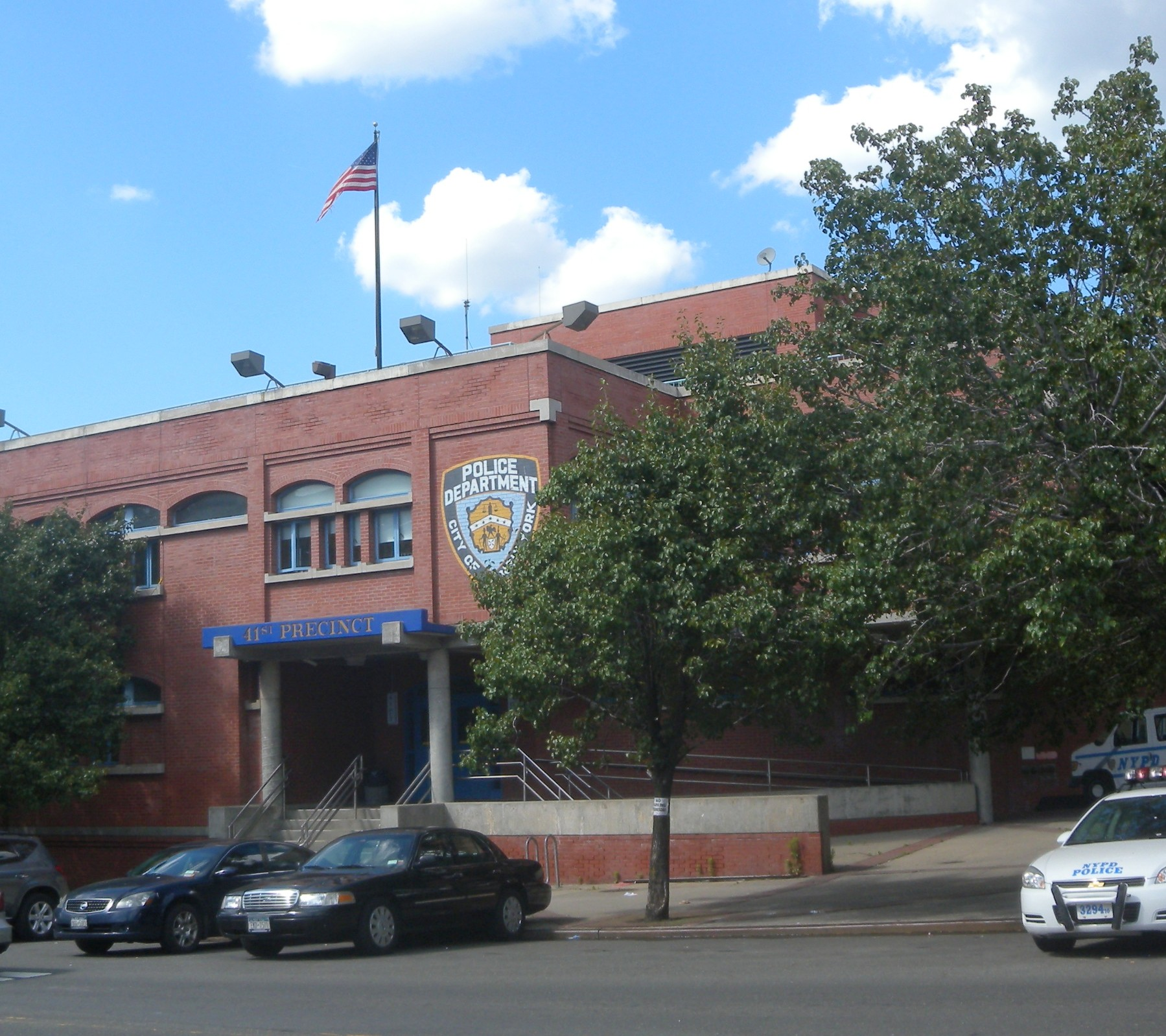
Current 41st Precinct

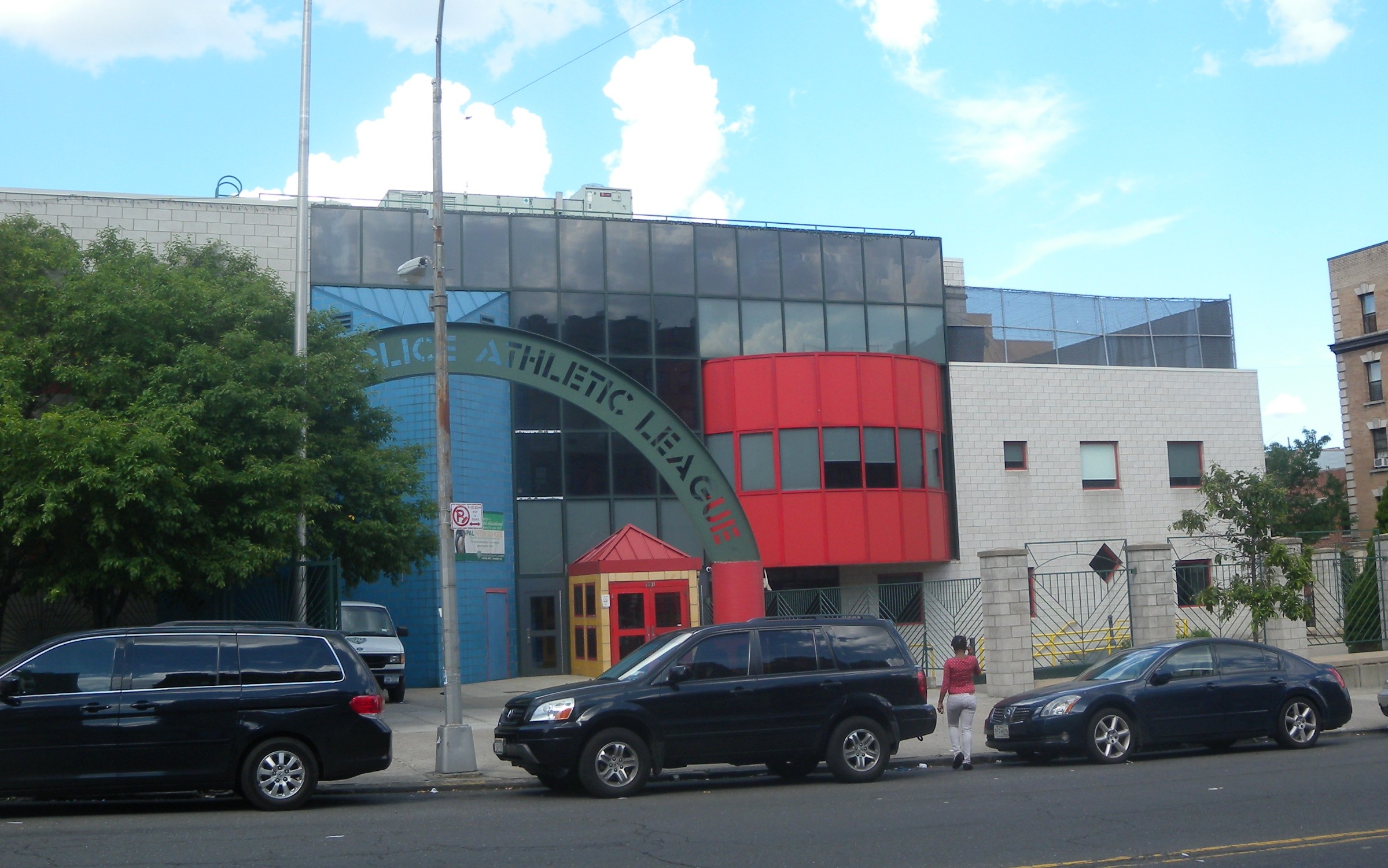
Police Athletic League of New York City

Longwood and Hunts Point are patrolled by the 41st Precinct of the NYPD, located at 1035 Longwood Avenue. The 41st Precinct ranked 67th safest out of 69 patrol areas for per-capita crime in 2010. As of 2018, with a non-fatal assault rate of 151 per 100,000 people, Longwood and Hunts Point's rate of violent crimes per capita is greater than that of the city as a whole. The incarceration rate of 1,036 per 100,000 people is higher than that of the city as a whole as of 2019.

The 41st Precinct has a lower crime rate than in the 1990s, with crimes across all categories having decreased by 63.5% between 1990 and 2025. The precinct reported 3 murders, 43 rapes, 235 robberies, 342 felony assaults, 183 burglaries, 327 grand larcenies, and 148 grand larcenies auto in 2025.

The 41st Precinct was located at 1086 Simpson Street until 1993. During the 1960s, crime reached such a level that the Simpson Street building became known by the police as "Fort Apache", as was later immortalized in a 1981 movie named for it. The Simpson Street building currently houses the Bronx Detectives Bureau.

== Fire safety ==
Longwood contains a New York City Fire Department (FDNY) fire station, Engine Co. 73/Ladder Co. 42, at 655 Prospect Avenue.

== Health ==
As of 2018, preterm births and births to teenage mothers are more common in Longwood and Hunts Point than in other places citywide. In Longwood and Hunts Point, there were 101 preterm births per 1,000 live births (compared to 87 per 1,000 citywide), and 36.2 births to teenage mothers per 1,000 live births (compared to 19.3 per 1,000 citywide). Longwood and Hunts Point has a relatively high population of residents who are uninsured. In 2018, this population of uninsured residents was estimated to be 14%, slightly higher than the citywide rate of 12%.

The concentration of fine particulate matter, the deadliest type of air pollutant, in Longwood and Hunts Point is 0.0085 milligrams per cubic metre (8.5×10^{−9} oz/ft^{3}), more than the city average. Fifteen percent of Longwood and Hunts Point residents are smokers, which is higher than the city average of 14% of residents being smokers. In Longwood and Hunts Point, 42% of residents are obese, 20% are diabetic, and 38% have high blood pressure—compared to the citywide averages of 24%, 11%, and 28% respectively. In addition, 26% of children are obese, compared to the citywide average of 20%.

Eighty-two percent of residents eat some fruits and vegetables every day, which is less than the city's average of 87%. In 2018, 72% of residents described their health as "good", "very good", or "excellent", lower than the city's average of 78%. For every supermarket in Longwood and Hunts Point, there are 20 bodegas.

The nearest hospital is NYC Health + Hospitals/Lincoln in Melrose.

== Post office and ZIP Codes ==
Longwood is covered by multiple ZIP Codes. The area north of Longwood Avenue is part of 10459 and the area south of Longwood Avenue is part of 10455. Though there are no post offices located in Longwood's borders, the United States Postal Service operates the Hunts Point Station at 800 Manida Street in Hunts Point.

== Education ==
Longwood and Hunts Point generally have a lower rate of college-educated residents than the rest of the city as of 2018. While 16% of residents age 25 and older have a college education or higher, 41% have less than a high school education and 43% are high school graduates or have some college education. By contrast, 26% of Bronx residents and 43% of city residents have a college education or higher. The percentage of Longwood and Hunts Point students excelling in math rose from 24% in 2000 to 26% in 2011, and reading achievement increased from 28% to 32% during the same time period.

Longwood and Hunts Point's rate of elementary school student absenteeism is more than the rest of New York City. In Longwood and Hunts Point, 35% of elementary school students missed twenty or more days per school year, higher than the citywide average of 20%. Additionally, 58% of high school students in Longwood and Hunts Point graduate on time, lower than the citywide average of 75%.

=== Schools ===
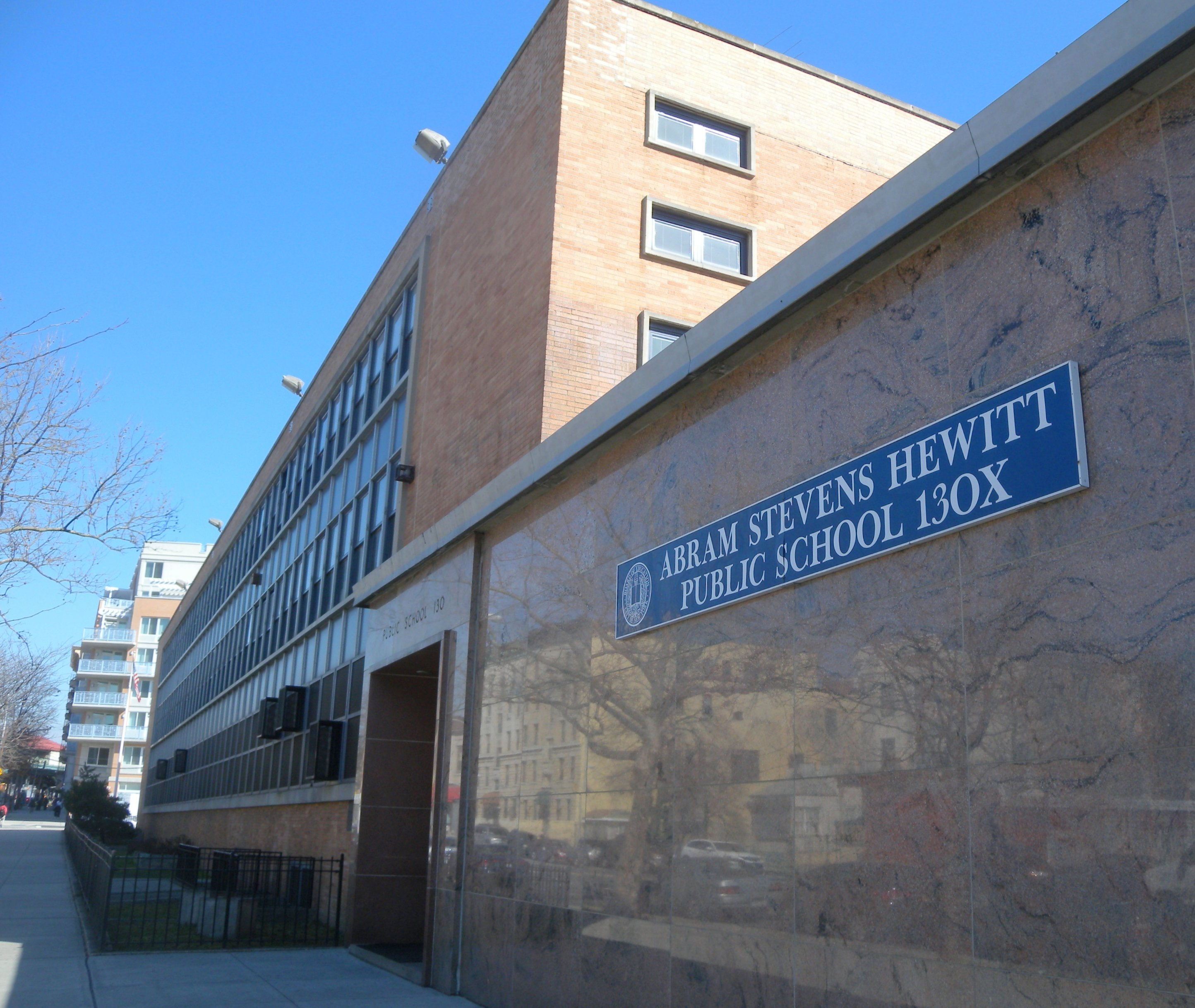
PS 130, Prospect Avenue

Public:

- PS 62: Inocencio Casanova (Leggett Avenue and Fox Street)
- PS 75: School of Research and Discovery (Faile Street and Bruckner Boulevard)
- PS 130: Abram Stevens Hewitt (East 156th Street and Prospect Avenue)
- PS 150: Charles James Fox (East 167th Street and Fox Street)
- PS 333: The Museum School (East 163rd Street and Rev. James A. Polite Avenue)
- PS 335: The Academy of the Arts (East 163rd Street and Rev. James A. Polite Avenue)
- MS 302: Luisa Dessus Cruz (Kelly Street and Avenue St. John)
- Bronx Regional High School (East 165th Street and Rev. James A. Polite Avenue)
- South Bronx Classical Charter School (Westchester Avenue and Fox Street)
- Bronx Lighthouse Charter School/Bronx Lighthouse College Preparatory Academy
- Bronx Studio School for Writers and Artists
- Banana Kelly High School
- Girls Prep Bronx Elementary (Kelly St.)
- Longwood Preparatory Academy (Formerly Banana Kelly High School)
- Success Academy Bronx Middle School (BXMS)

Parochial:

- St. Athanasius School

=== Libraries ===
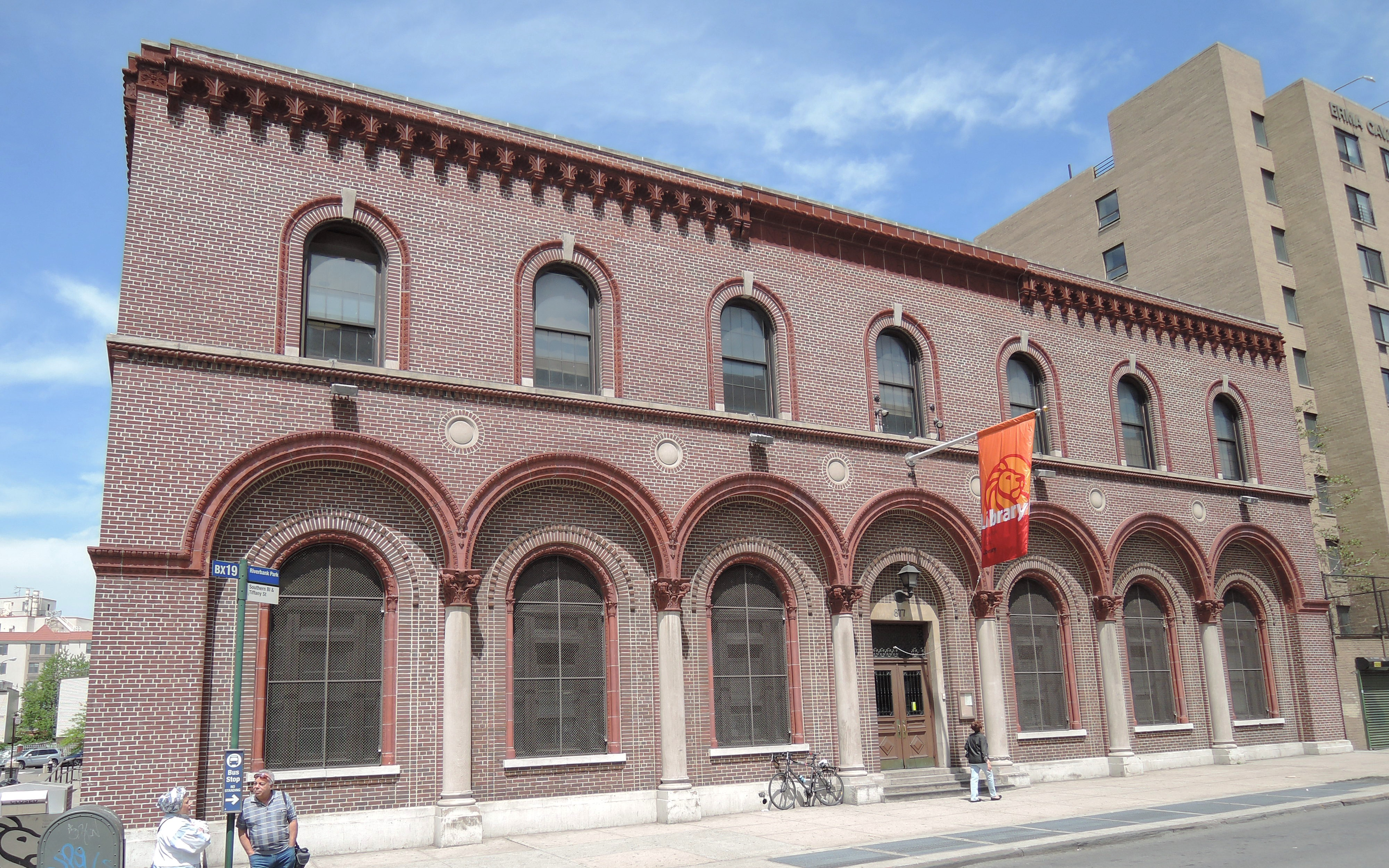
New York Public Library, Hunts Point branch

The New York Public Library operates two branches near Longwood. The Woodstock branch, a two-story Carnegie library building opened in 1914, is located at 761 East 160th Street. The Hunts Point branch, a two-story Carnegie library building opened in 1929, is located at 877 Southern Boulevard. The Hunts Point library, designed by Carrère and Hastings in the Italian Renaissance style, was the last Carnegie library built for the New York Public Library system and is a New York City designated landmark.

== Transportation ==
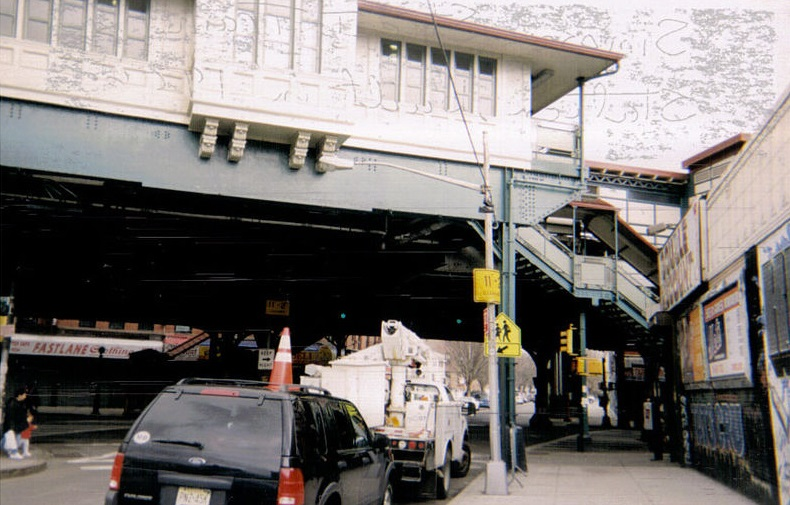
The New York City Subway's Simpson Street station, on Westchester Avenue between Simpson Street and Southern Boulevard, opened in 1904 and is listed in the National Register of Historic Places.

The following MTA Regional Bus Operations bus routes serve Longwood:

- Bx4: to Westchester Square (6 and <6>) or Third Avenue–149th Street (2 and 5 trains) (via Westchester Avenue)
- Bx4A: to Westchester Square (6 train) or Simpson Street (2 and 5 trains) (via Westchester Avenue and Metropolitan Oval)
- Bx5: to Co-op City and Bay Plaza Shopping Center (via Bruckner Blvd, and Story Avenue)
- Bx6 and Bx6 SBS: to Hunts Point or Riverside Drive, Manhattan (via 161st and 163rd Streets)
- Bx17: to Fordham Plaza or Port Morris (via Prospect and Crotona Avenues)
- Bx19: to New York Botanical Garden or Riverbank State Park (via 149th Street and Southern Boulevard)
- Bx27: to Clason Point (via Rosedale Avenue)
- Bx35: to Crotona Park East or George Washington Bridge Bus Terminal (via 167th Street)
- Bx46: to Prospect Avenue (2 and 5 trains) or Hunts Point (via Longwood Avenue and Tiffany Street)

The following New York City Subway stations serve Longwood:

- Whitlock Avenue (6 train)
- Simpson Street (2 and 5 trains)
- Intervale Avenue (2 and 5 trains)
- Hunts Point Avenue (6 and <6> trains)
- Prospect Avenue (2 and 5 trains)
- Longwood Avenue (6 train)
- East 149th Street (6 train)
- Jackson Avenue (2 and 5 trains)

== Notable natives ==
- Colin Powell lived on both Kelly Street and Fox Street, and attended Morris High School.
