= Hunts Point Riverside Park =

Public park in the Bronx, New York

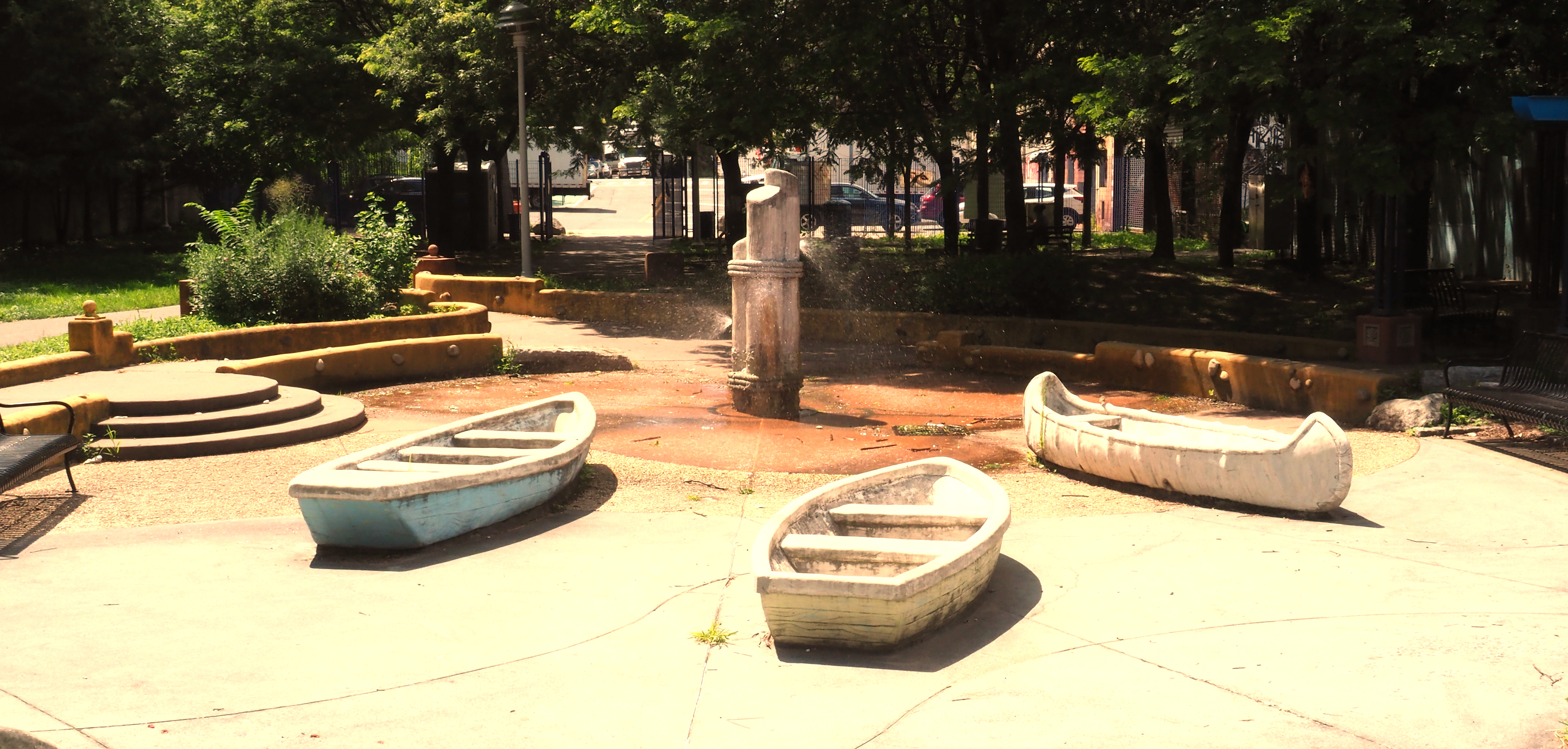
- Interactive map of Hunts Point Riverside Park
- Type: Municipal park
- Location: Hunts Point, Bronx, The Bronx, New York
- Coordinates: 40.817722°N 73.881528°W
- Area: 0.43 acres (0.17 ha)
- Opened: 1940
- Owner: New York City Department of Parks and Recreation
- Status: open all year
- Water: The Bronx River
- Public transit: New York City Bus: Bx6
- Connector to: The South Bronx Greenway
- Facilities: kayaking, playground
- Website: www.nycgovparks.org/parks/hunts-point-riverside-park/

Hunts Point Riverside Park is a riverside park located in the Hunts Point neighborhood in the South Bronx section of New York City. It is the first new riverside park to be built in the area in over sixty years, and is the first of a planned series of parks to be linked by a bike route to create the South Bronx Greenway.

Ground was broken July 19, 2004, on a US$ 3.2 million project to convert a vacant lot used as an illegal dumping ground into a 1.4-acre (5,700 m^{2}) park.

Before the planned park project, the site was an abandoned lot that was once part of a defunct Robert Moses era bridge project. The POINT Community Development Corporation's Majora Carter spearheaded the development of this park.

Hunts Point Riverside Park was the 2009 Silver Medalist of the Rudy Bruner Award for Urban Excellence

Before

After

== See also ==
- South Bronx Greenway
- Barretto Point Park
