= Barretto Point Park =

Public park in the Bronx, New York

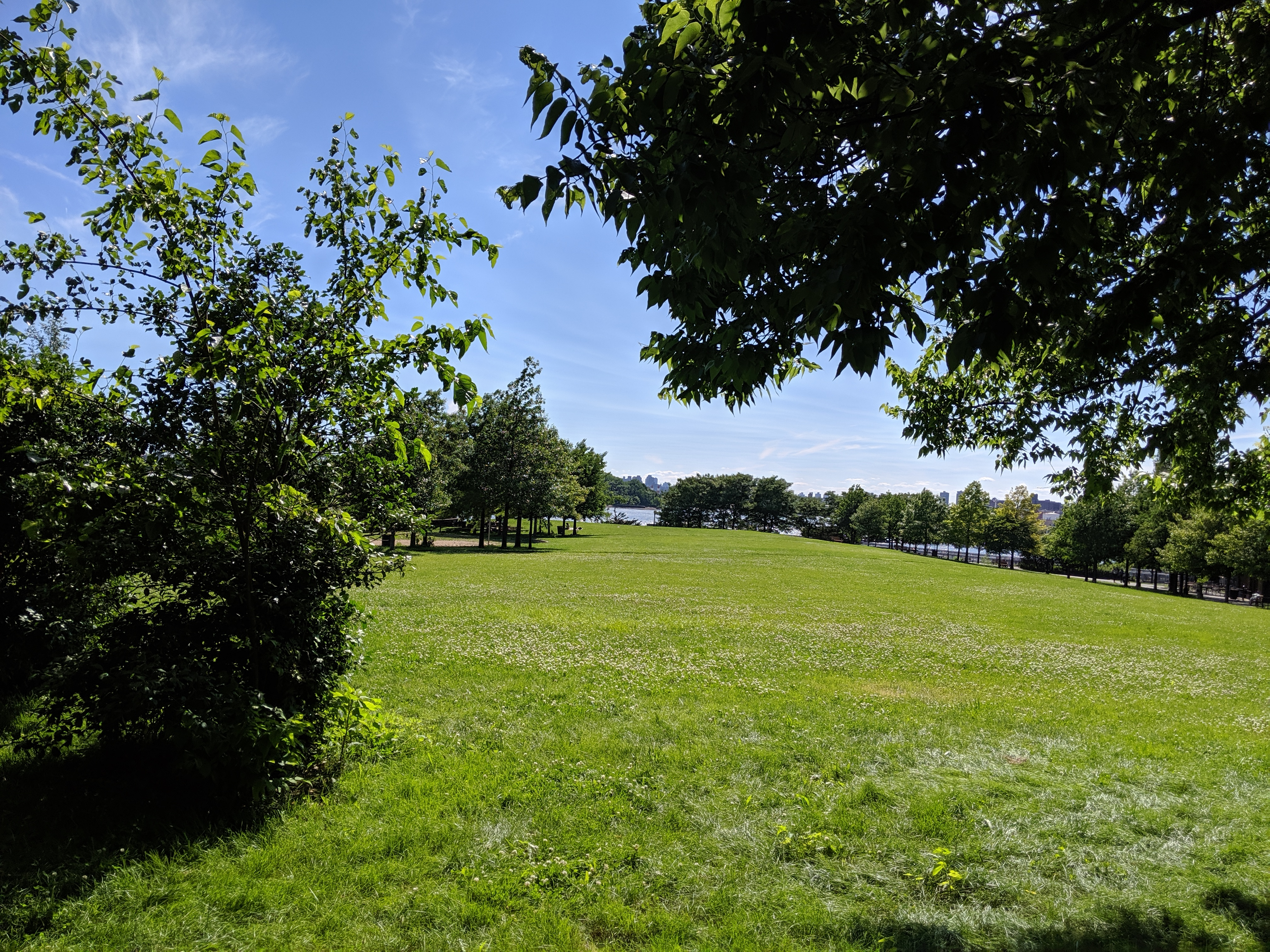
- Barretto Point Park central lawn, with East River in the background
- Interactive map of Barretto Point Park
- Type: Municipal park
- Location: Hunts Point, The Bronx, New York
- Coordinates: 40.8056°N 73.8883°W
- Area: 12.22 acres (4.95 ha)
- Opened: 2006
- Owner: New York City Department of Parks and Recreation
- Status: open all year
- Water: East River
- Public transit: New York City Bus: Bx46
- Facilities: swimming pool, picnic area, fishing pier, waterfront promenade, children's playground, basketball court, handball court, kayak/canoe launch, restrooms
- Website: www.nycgovparks.org/parks/X307/

Barretto Point Park is a waterfront public park on the East River located in the Hunts Point neighborhood of the Bronx, New York City, United States. Its namesake is Francis J. Barretto, a 19th-century merchant and State Assemblyman who lived in the area.

== History ==
The New York City Department of Parks and Recreation acquired the property in 2001 from the city's Department of Environmental Protection, and the park opened to the public in 2006. The land on which the park was created was remediated and capped to make sure it was clean and safe. Prior to 1950, the site housed a sand and gravel operation and an asphalt plant. Between 1954 and 1978, the placement of fill on the site increased the size of the upland.

Since 2008, Barretto Point Park has been host to a barge named the Floating Pool Lady. The 20,000 square-foot vessel contains an outdoor 25-meter swimming pool with a pool house; locker rooms with showers; bathrooms; a children's spray shower; a gangplank leading to and from the barge; and other amenities, including a small amphitheater.

== Landscape ==
The landscape of Barretto Point Park recalls the rustic atmosphere that once characterized Hunts Point and provides a popular outdoor gathering space for its residents. The park is accessible from the East River by canoe and kayak, and provides views of the North and South Brother Islands, which are bird sanctuaries with histories that span three centuries. The islands themselves are closed to the public.

== Tiffany Street Pier ==
To the immediate west of Barretto Point Park is the Tiffany Street Pier, a recreational space that predates the park and also offers views of the bird sanctuary islands in the East River. Previously used as a loading dock, it became popular with recreational fishermen and local residents in search of a quiet space on the waterfront.

In 1995, the city rebuilt the pier out of an innovative material produced from 1.5 million recycled plastic bottles, which can withstand damage caused by wood-boring marine insects. In September 1996, a lightning strike melted a third of the pier, including its gazebo. The pier reopened in 2000 and in the following year, the city's Department of Citywide Administrative Services assigned the pier and surrounding underwater parcels to the Parks department. Although at the time, the pier was a considerable walk from residential sections of Hunts Point, it again welcomed individuals seeking fishing, sunbathing and a view of the water.

== Gallery ==
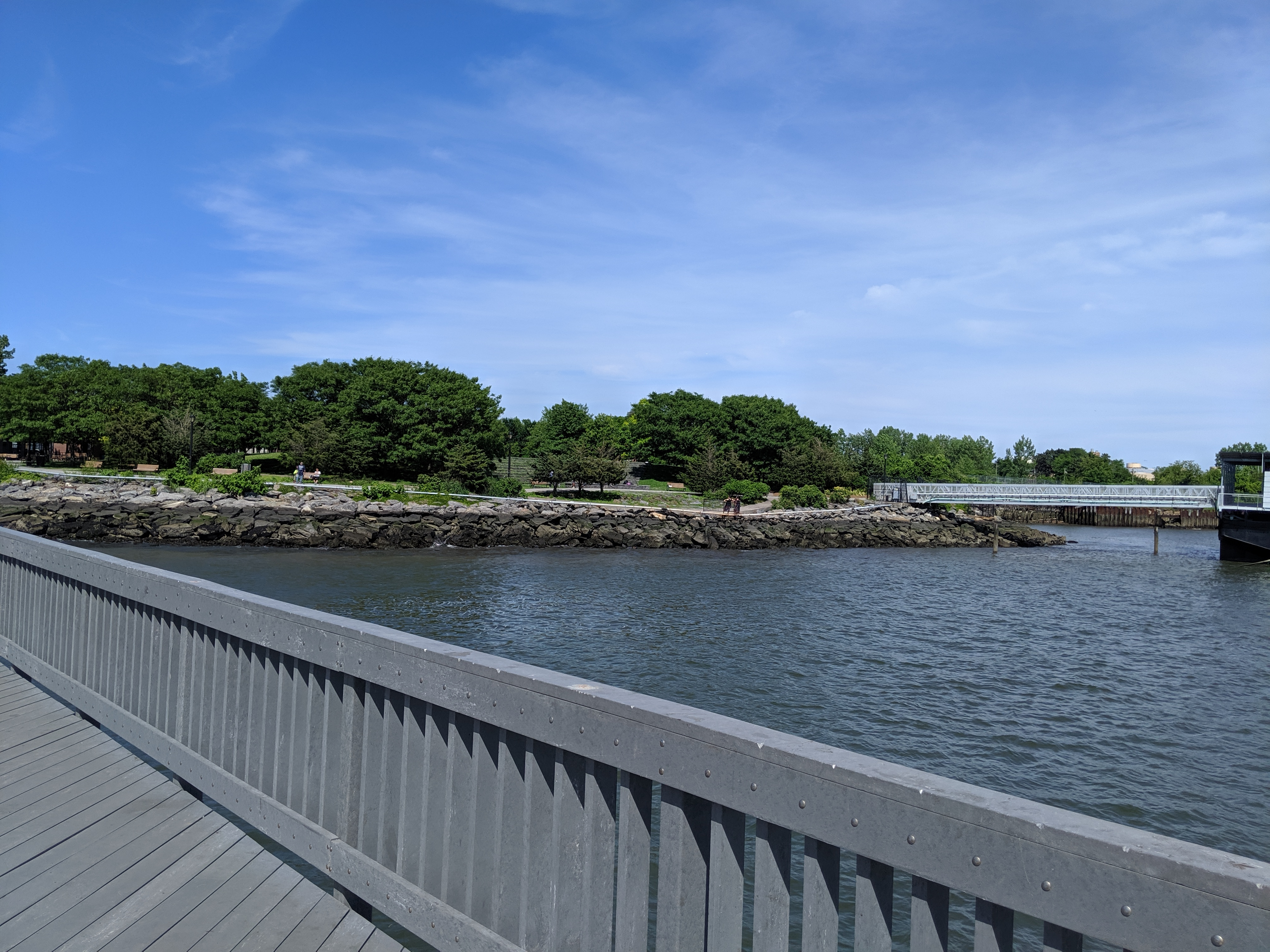
Barretto Point Park from Tiffany Street Pier

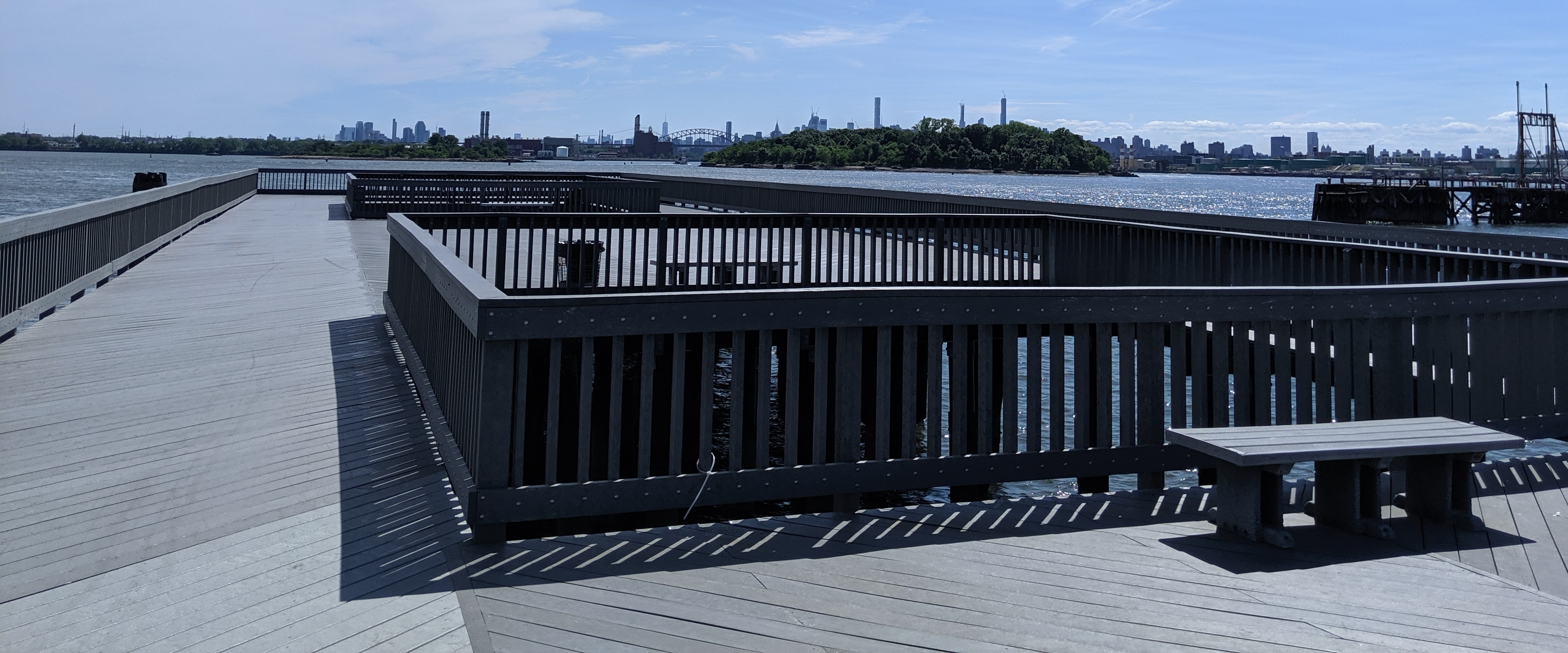
Tiffany Street Pier near Barretto Point Park, with North Brother and South Brother islands in the distance

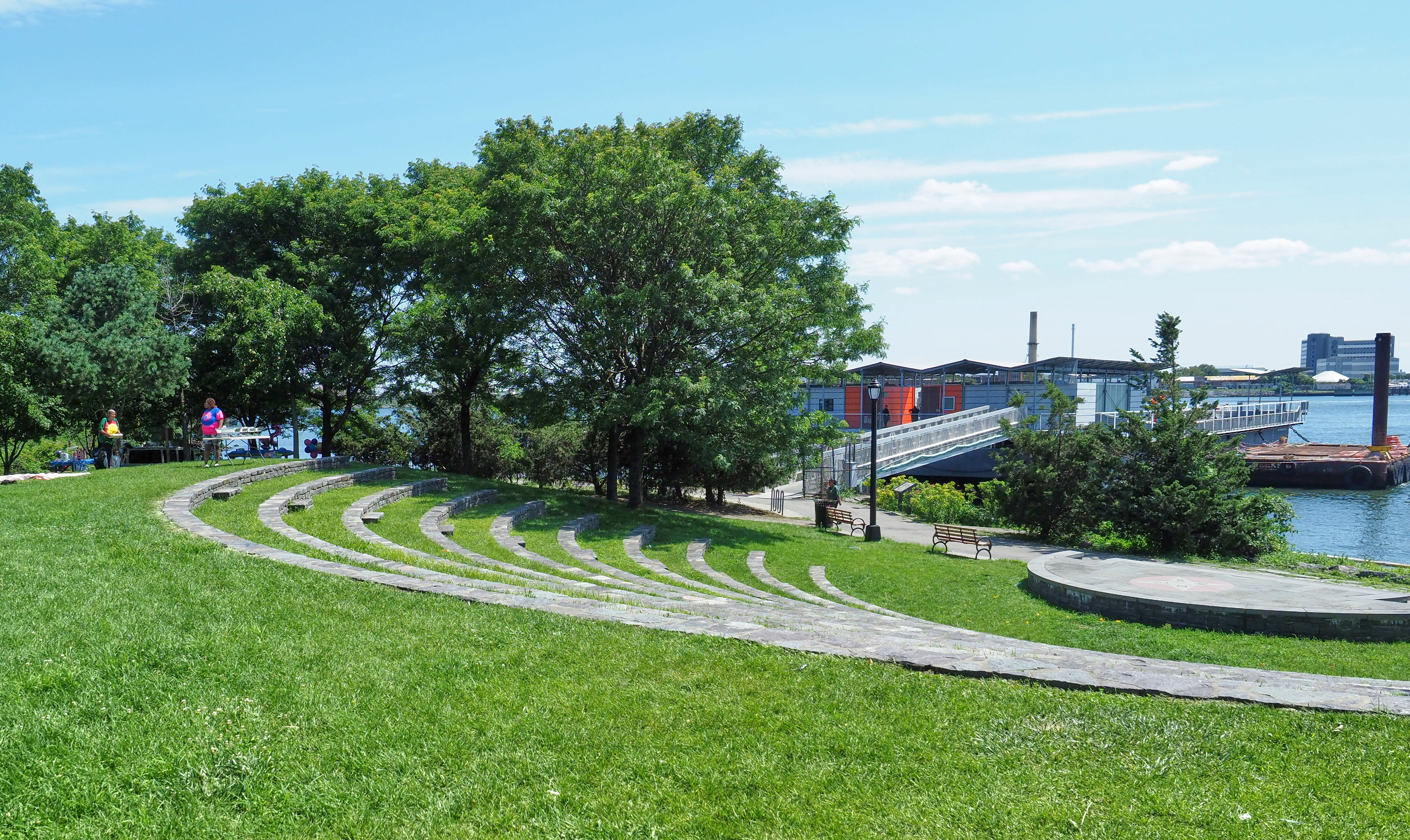
Amphitheater

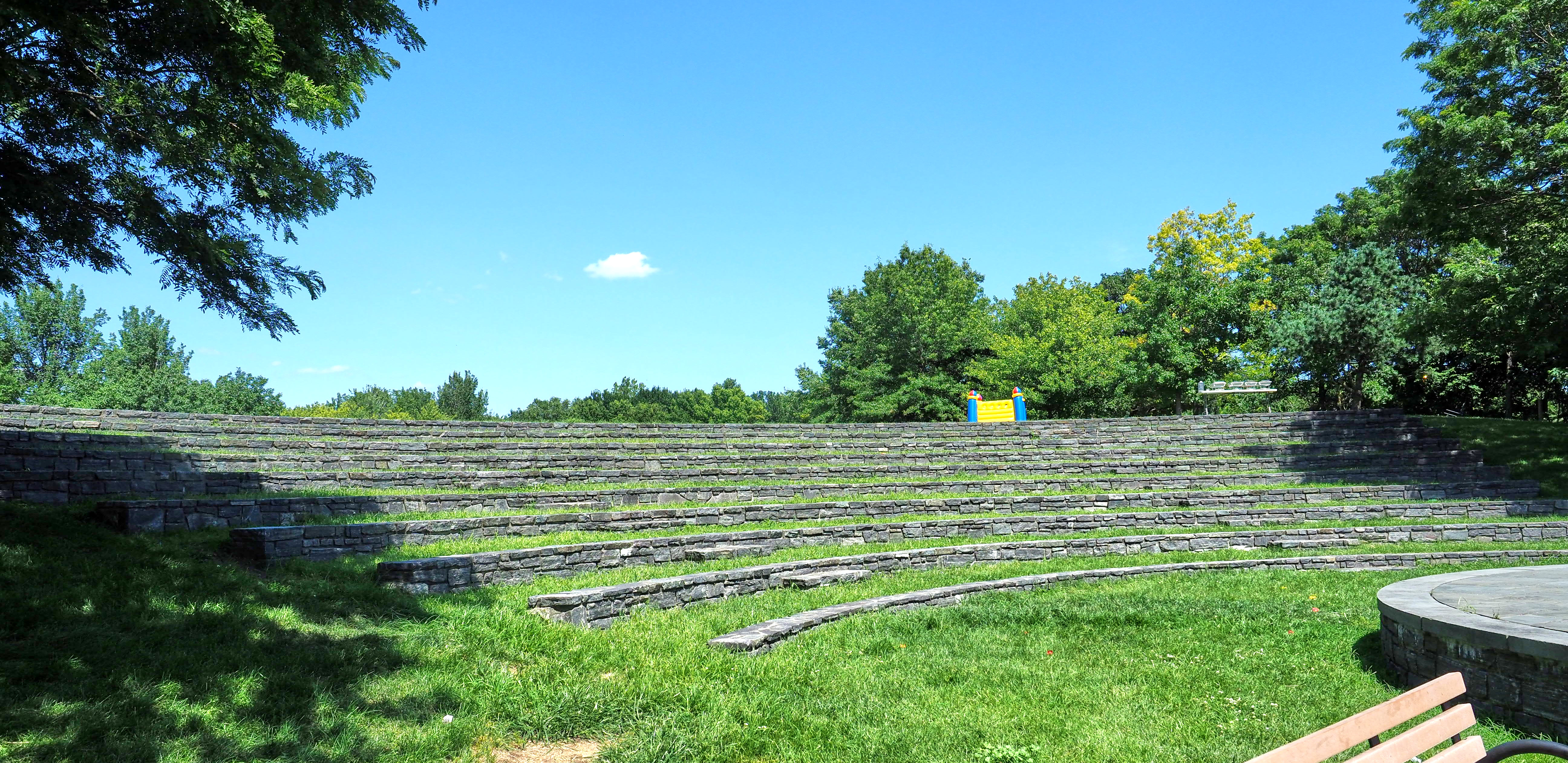
Amphitheater

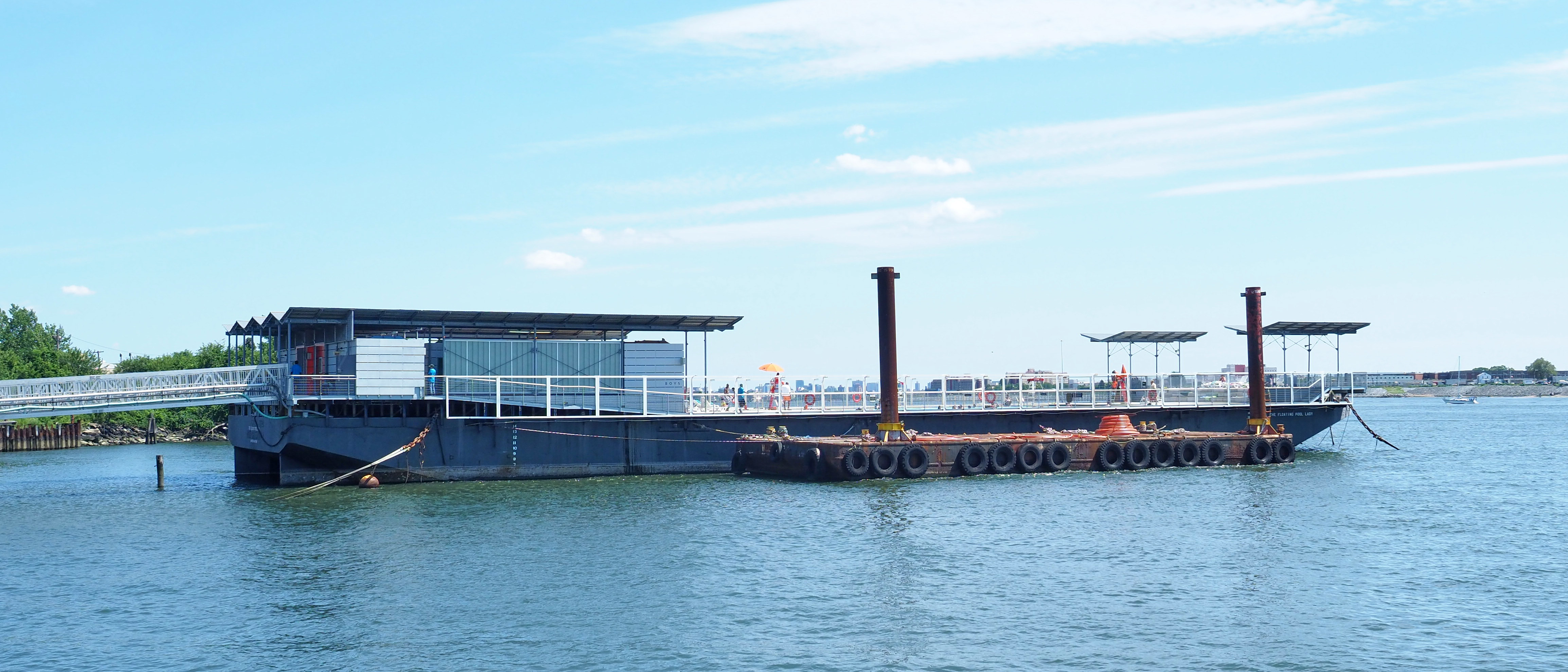
Floating Pool Lady

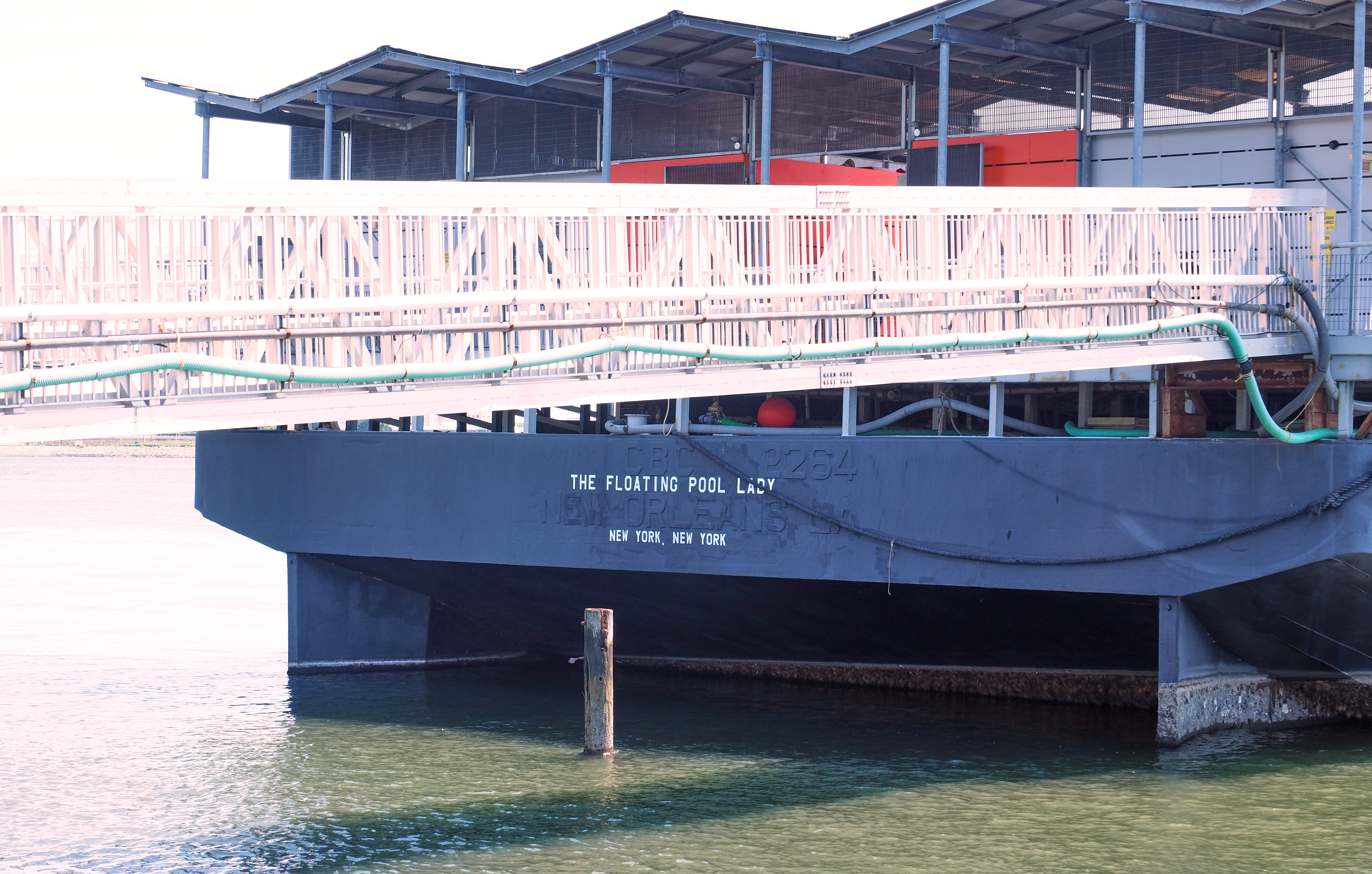
Floating Pool Lady
