= Hunts Point, Bronx =

Neighborhood in New York City

Hunts Point
- Neighborhood of the Bronx
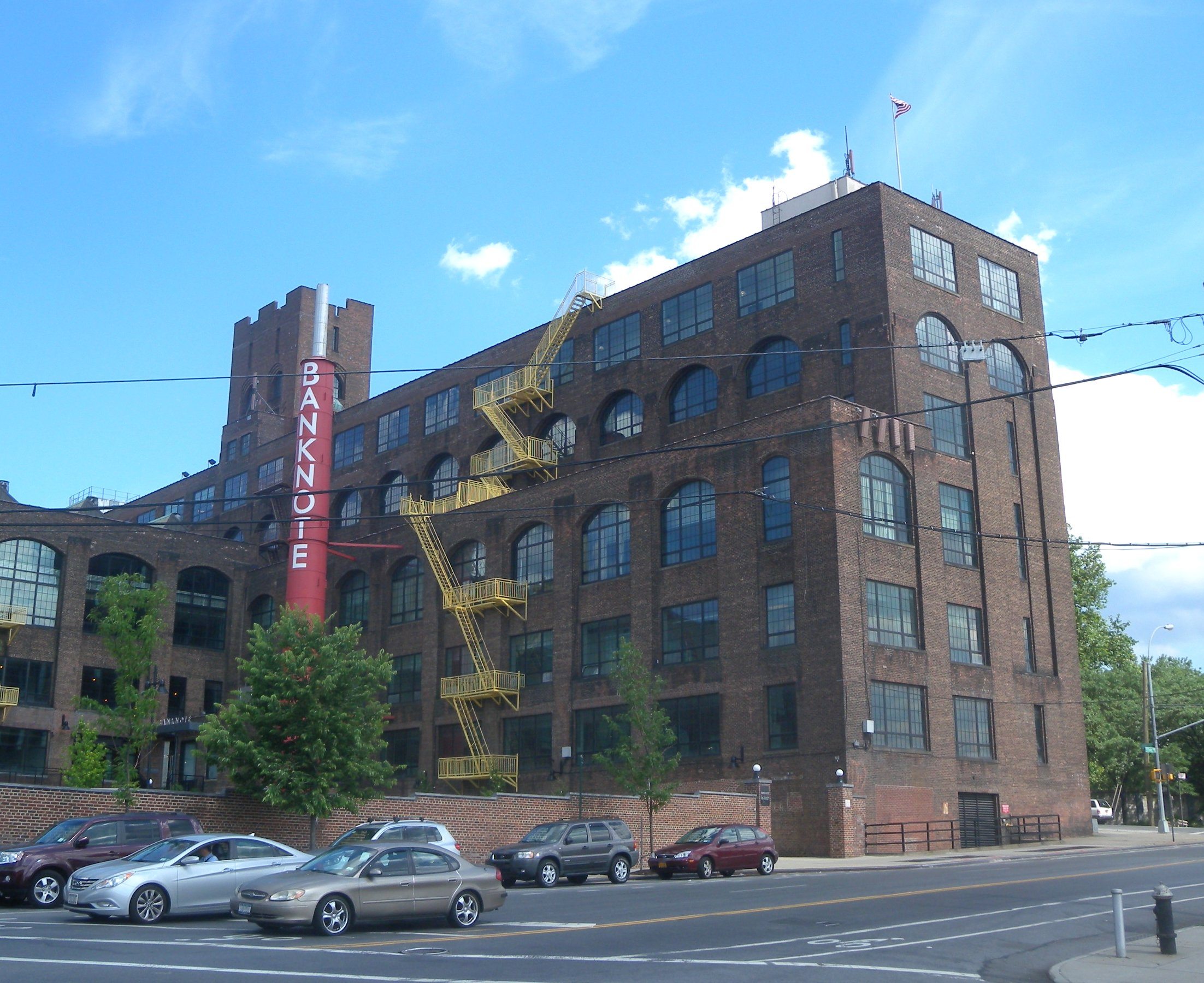
- The American Bank Note Company Printing Plant in Hunts Point
- Interactive map of Hunts Point
- Coordinates: 40°48′45″N 73°53′02″W
- Country: United States
- State: New York
- City: New York City
- Borough: Bronx
- Community District: Bronx 2
- Founded: 1849
- Named for: Thomas Hunt

Area
  - Total: 1.650 sq mi (4.27 km^{2})

Population (2020)
  - Total: 15,131
  - Density: 9,170/sq mi (3,541/km^{2})
- ZIP Code: 10474
- Area code: 718, 347, 929, and 917
- Website: www.huntspoint.nyc

Hunts Point is a neighborhood located on a peninsula in the South Bronx of New York City. It is the location of one of the largest food distribution facilities in the world, the Hunts Point Cooperative Market. Its boundaries are the Bruckner Expressway to the west and north, the Bronx River to the east, and the East River to the south. Hunts Point Avenue is the primary street through Hunts Point.

The neighborhood is part of Bronx Community District 2, and its ZIP Code is 10474. The neighborhood is served by the New York City Police Department's 41st Precinct. NYCHA property in the area is patrolled by P.S.A. 7 at 737 Melrose Avenue located in the Melrose section of the Bronx.

== History ==
=== European settlement ===
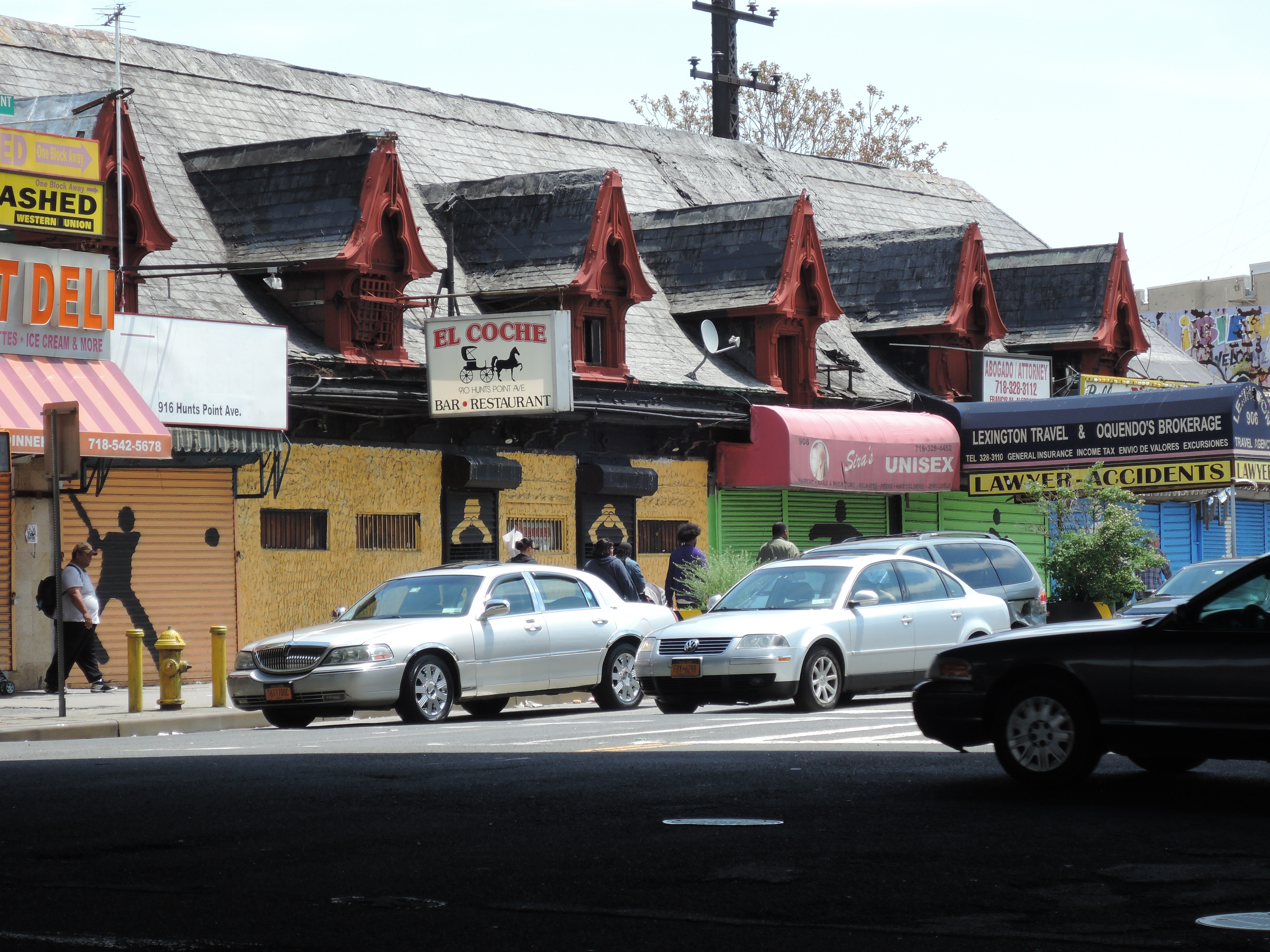
Former Hunts Point station of New York, Westchester and Boston Railway, now serving shops

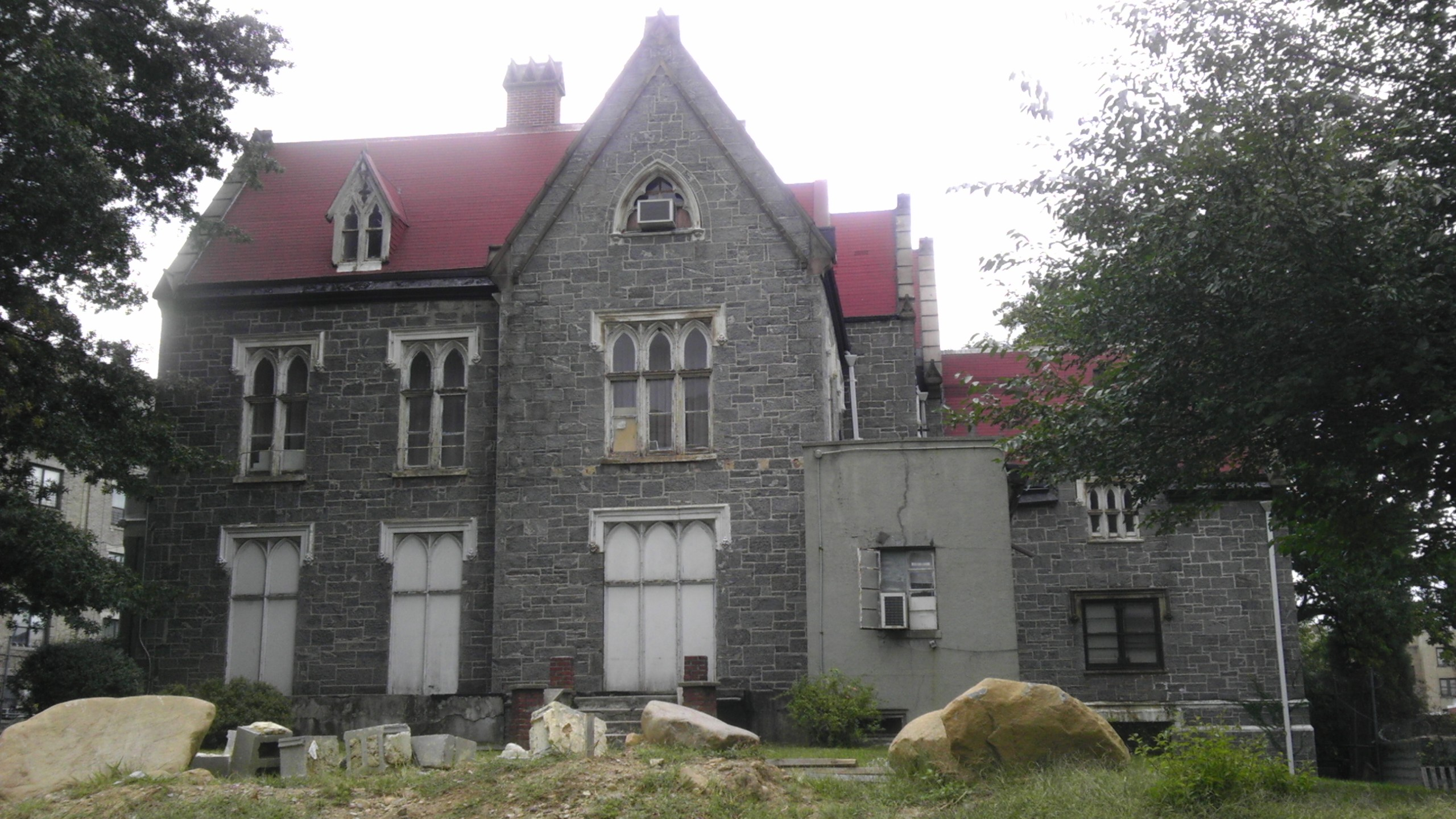
Sunnyslope, a historic home located in Hunts Point

Hunts Point was populated by the Wecquaesgeek, a Munsee-speaking band of Wappinger people, until English settlers first arrived in 1663. At this time, Edward Jessup and John Richardson arrived on the peninsula and purchased the lands from the Wecquaesgeek. After Jessup died, his widow, Elizabeth, entrusted the land to Thomas Hunt Jr., her son in-law for whom the area is named.

In the years between the Hunts' inheritance and 1850, several other wealthy landowning families occupied the peninsula. Legend has it that George Fox (1624–1691), founder of the Society of Friends (commonly known as Quakers), preached in the area in 1672. William H. Fox, a descendant of the Quaker leader, and his wife Charlotte Leggett, owned much of the land that is now Hunts Point.

As time passed and more New Yorkers became aware of Hunts Point, more City dwellers flocked to the area between 1850 and 1900. Later, the property wound up in the hands of Fox's and Leggett's son-in-law, H. D. Tiffany, a member of the family that owned the famous jewelry and decorative arts store Tiffany & Co. now on Fifth Avenue in Manhattan. Fox, Tiffany and Leggett Streets derive their names from these former landowners. In 1909, the Fox mansion was demolished.

=== Industry ===
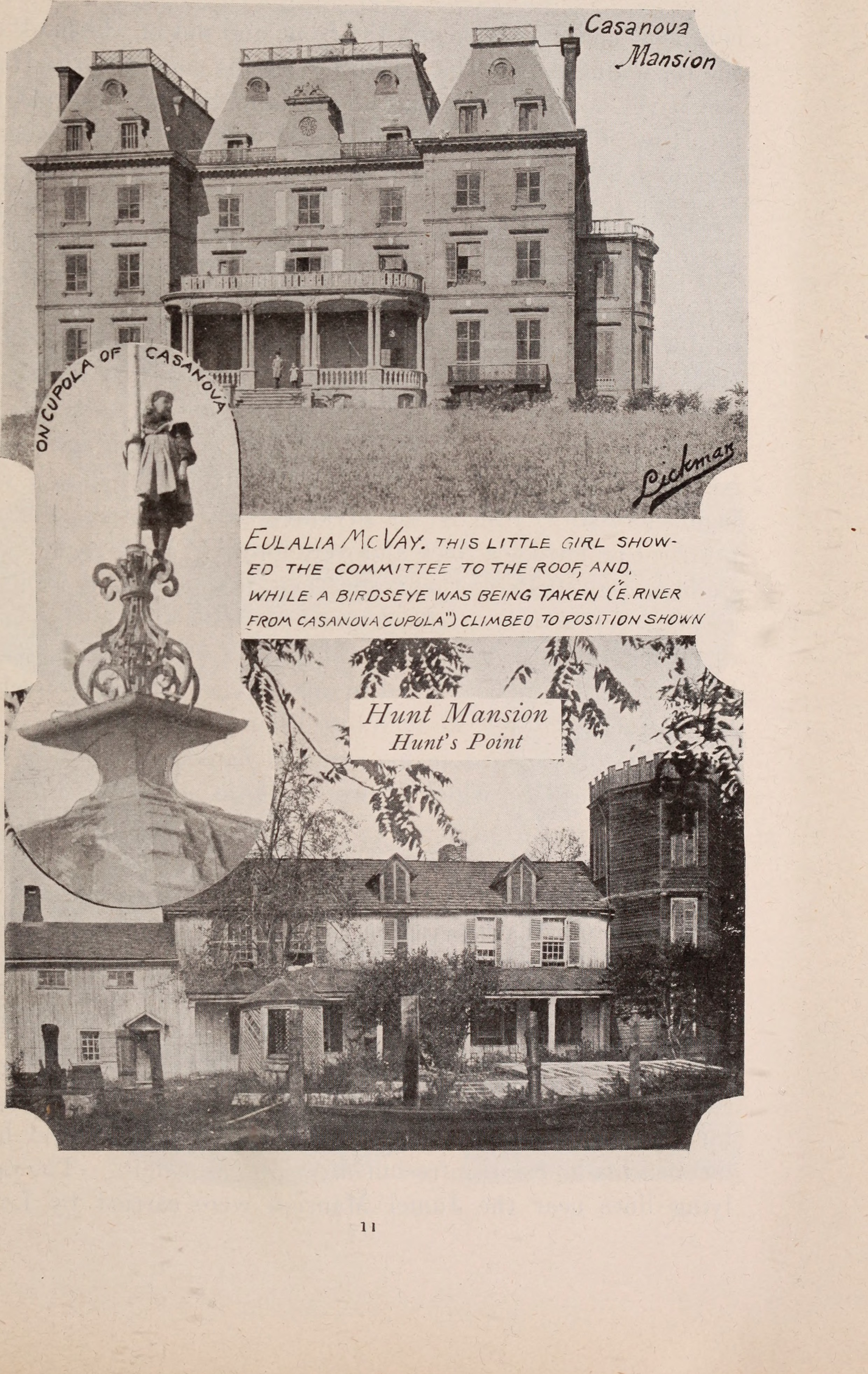
Casanova Mansion and Hunt mansion, 1890s

Hunts Point's status as a home and vacation spot to the city's elite came to an abrupt end in the period following World War I. At this time, the IRT Pelham Line (6 and <6> trains) was built along Southern Boulevard. Apartment buildings replaced mansions, streets replaced meadows and Hunts Point became a virtual melting pot for the city's masses.

Aside from being a period of residential growth for Hunts Point, the 20th century was also a time of industrial expansion for the peninsula. As more people moved to the area, the city's business owners began to realize the advantages of locating to Hunts Point. Among these advantages were the convenient access to the Tri-State region, the existing rail lines running through the Hunts Point area and the abundance of space available for the development of industrial and commercial activity.

This discovery led to an influx of businesses to the area. As the momentum of incoming businesses increased, the reputation of Hunts Point grew accordingly among business circles. With the openings of the New York City Produce market in 1967 and Hunts Point Meat Market in 1974, and culminating with the designation of Hunts Point as an In-Place-Industrial Park in 1980, Hunts Point has grown into a successful economic zone. The Hunts Point Industrial Park hosts over 800 businesses providing an array of products and services to points throughout the world.

The second half of the 20th century, however, proved a difficult time for the district's residential community. Characterized by frequent arson and mass abandonment from the 1960s through the 1990s, this period marked a low point in the area's history. Living conditions became so difficult that almost 60,000 residents, approximately two-thirds of the population in Bronx Community District 2, left the neighborhood during the 1970s. The first full-service post office did not open in the neighborhood until 2001.

== Demographics ==
Hunts Point, which is stipulated as Neighborhood Tabulation Area BX0201 by the New York City Department of City Planning, had 15,131 inhabitants based on data from the 2020 United States Census and covered an area of 1,124 acres (455 ha). This was an decrease of 327 persons (-2.1%) from the 15,458 counted in 2010. The neighborhood had a population density of 15.1 inhabitants per acre (14,500/sq mi; 5,600/km^{2}).

The racial makeup of the neighborhood was 1.7% (264) White (Non-Hispanic), 24.8% (3,752) Black (Non-Hispanic), 2.6% (400) from other races or from two or more races. Hispanic or Latino of any race were 70.8% (10,715) of the population.

According to the 2020 United States Census, Hunts Point has many cultural communities of over 1,000 inhabitants. These groups are residents who identify as Dominican, Puerto Rican, and African American.

Most inhabitants are young adults: 46.1% are between 10-39 years old. 65.1% of the households had at least one family present. Out of the 4,988 households, 22.8% had a married couple (11.3% with a child under 18), 23.4% had a single male (2.1% with a child under 18), and 46.4% had a single female (15.1% with a child under 18). 39.1% of households had children. In Hunts Point 91.7% of non-vacant housing units are renter-occupied.

The entirety of Community District 2, which comprises Hunts Point and Longwood, had 56,144 inhabitants as of NYC Health's 2018 Community Health Profile, with an average life expectancy of 78.9 years. This is lower than the median life expectancy of 81.2 for all New York City neighborhoods.

As of 2017, the median household income in Community Districts 1 and 2, including Melrose and Mott Haven, was $20,966. In 2018, an estimated 29% of Hunts Point and Longwood residents lived in poverty, compared to 25% in all of the Bronx and 20% in all of New York City. One in eight residents (12%) were unemployed, compared to 13% in the Bronx and 9% in New York City. Rent burden, or the percentage of residents who have difficulty paying their rent, is 58% in Hunts Point and Longwood, compared to the boroughwide and citywide rates of 58% and 51% respectively. Based on this calculation, as of 2018, Hunts Point and Longwood are gentrifying.

== Land use and terrain ==
Hunts Point is a peninsula located at the confluence of the Bronx River and the East River, which is actually a tidal strait connecting Upper New York Bay to the Long Island Sound. The total land area is approximately 690 acres (2.8 km^{2}).

The land area in Hunts Point is dominated by industry. There is a small but dense residential pocket that occupies the high ground in the northern half of the peninsula along Hunts Point Avenue. It consists primarily of older pre-war architecture apartment buildings with a smaller number of semi-detached multi-unit row houses. The area includes the recently developed Hunts Point Riverside Park.

The New York City Department of City Planning designated a Special Hunts Point District in 2004 to incorporate zoning changes to encourage growth of the food distribution center while protecting the residential neighborhood.

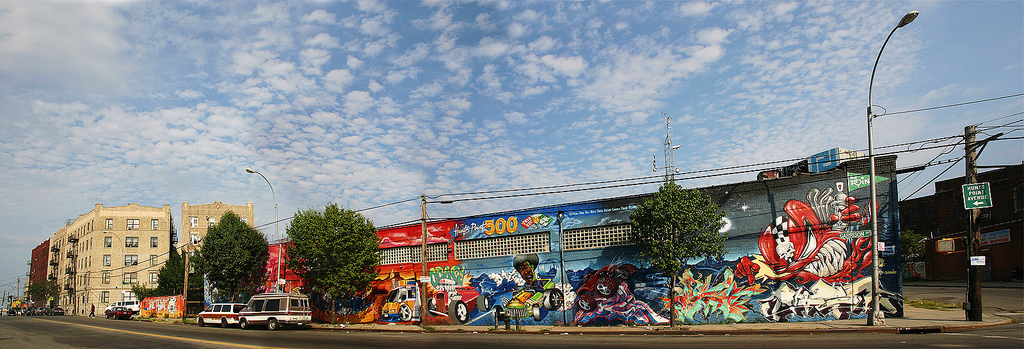
Colorful mural and tenement buildings along Garrison Avenue.

=== Parks ===
Hunts Point Riverside Park was spearheaded by Majora Carter in 2000, and after several iterations, won the 2009 Rudy Bruner Award for Excellence in Public Spaces.

Joseph Rodman Drake Park is now recognized as the site of a burial ground for enslaved African-Americans.

The largest park in Hunts Point is the 5-acre (20,000 m^{2}) Barretto Point Park on the East River waterfront. It offers piers for fishing, sites for launching canoes and kayaks, and a floating swimming pool during the summer. There are also volleyball and basketball courts, a small amphitheater, and restroom facilities.

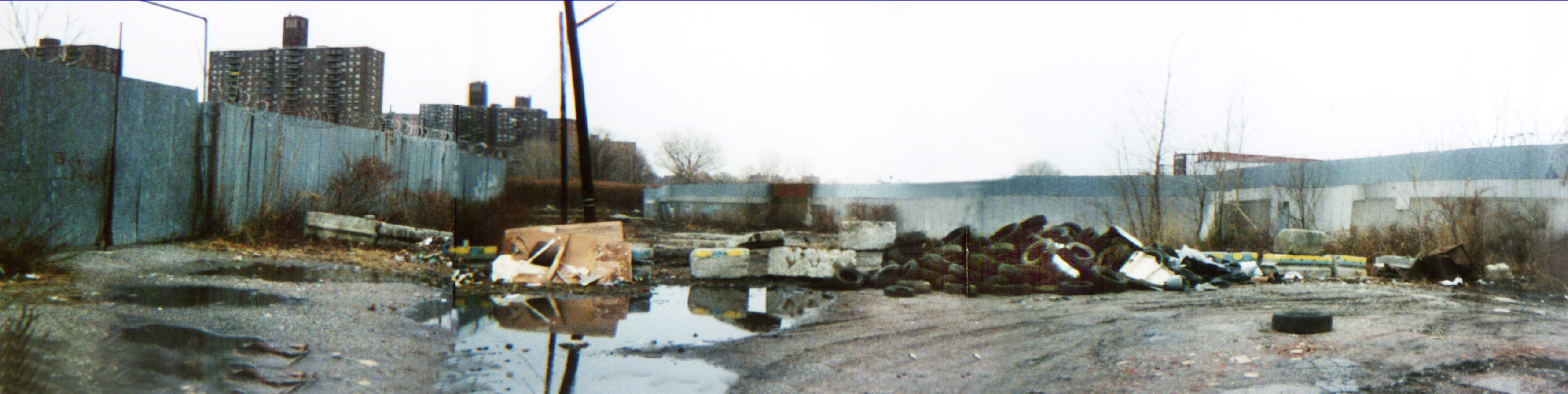
Riverside Park before clean up

Riverside Park after clean up

=== Hunts Point Food Distribution Center ===
Hunts Point is home to one of the largest food distribution centers in the world, covering 329 acres (1.33 km^{2}). The Produce and Meat Distribution Center were opened along the Bronx river in 1967 and 1974, respectively. In 2005, Hunts Point became the site for New York City's New Fulton Fish Market, which replaced the 180-year-old fish market formerly located in downtown Manhattan. Over 800 industrial businesses, employing over 25,000 workers, are located on the peninsula. A large concentration of food wholesalers, distributors, and food processing businesses are located in the New York City zoned industrial business park. Below are some of the facilities that make up the Food Distribution Center in Hunts Point:

The New York City Terminal Market carries fresh fruit and vegetables from 49 states and 55 foreign countries. The market consists of four buildings, each one-third of a mile in length. More than 65 fruit and vegetable wholesalers own and operate the coop, which has 475,000 square feet (44,100 m^{2}) of warehouse space. Each year approximately 2.7 billion pounds of produce are sold from the Market which as recently as 1998 posted $1.5 billion in revenues. The market caters to the largest ethnically diverse region in the world with an estimated population that exceeds 15 million people (New York metropolitan area).

The Hunts Point Cooperative Market handles the production, processing, distribution and sale of meat, poultry and related products. Spread over 38 acres (150,000 m^{2}), the market's six main buildings offer 700,000 square feet (70,000 m^{2}) of refrigerated space. More than 50 independent wholesale food companies operate facilities here. In 2002, a state-of-the art, 100,000-square-foot (10,000 m^{2}) refrigerated warehouse was added to accommodate the ever-expanding needs businesses.

In November 2001, shortly before leaving office, former New York City Mayor Rudolph Giuliani broke ground for the new Fulton Fish Market building in Hunts Point. Nearly four years after the structure was completed, which cost $85 million to build, 55 businesses moved into a 450,000-square-foot (42,000 m^{2}) complex, located within the Hunts Point Food Distribution Center. The facility generates an estimated $1 billion in yearly revenue, as it allows seafood distributors to store their goods in a temperature controlled warehouse with ease of access to NYC, New Jersey and Connecticut.

=== Detention centers ===
Spofford Juvenile Center was formerly the New York City Department of Juvenile Justice's (DJJ) only Secure Detention center. The facility started as the Youth House for Boys and Youth House for Girls in the mid-1940s, and it moved to Hunts Point in 1957. The Youth House soon became known as Spofford Juvenile Center. On August 1, 1998, it was vacated by the DJJ; earlier that year, on January 18, the city announced that the Horizon Juvenile Center, in the Mott Haven neighborhood of the Bronx, and the Crossroads Juvenile Center, in Brownsville, Brooklyn, would be opened to replace the Spofford facility. However, ultimately, Spofford was not closed, but was instead renamed Bridges Juvenile Center in 1999. In early 2011, Bridges was closed by the city. In announcing the closure, the Correctional Association of New York recognized that the facility had "a history of poor conditions and brutality against children." It was considered the juvenile counterpart of Attica Correctional Facility, which in turn has long been reckoned as the toughest adult prison in New York. The prison detention center was torn down in 2019 for a large, mixed use development to include over 700 housing units.

The Vernon C. Bain Correctional Center (VCBC) was an 800-bed barge offshore of Hunts Point, formerly used as part of the New York City Department of Corrections. It was designed to handle inmates from medium- to maximum-security in 16 dormitories and 100 cells. It was opened in 1992 with the intention of reducing crowding on Rikers Island, and was named for Vernon C. Bain, a warden who died in a car accident. It had been used by the city of New York as a prison, but has also temporarily held juvenile inmates. The facility closed in November of 2023, & the barge was towed away for scrap in November of 2025.

=== Public housing ===
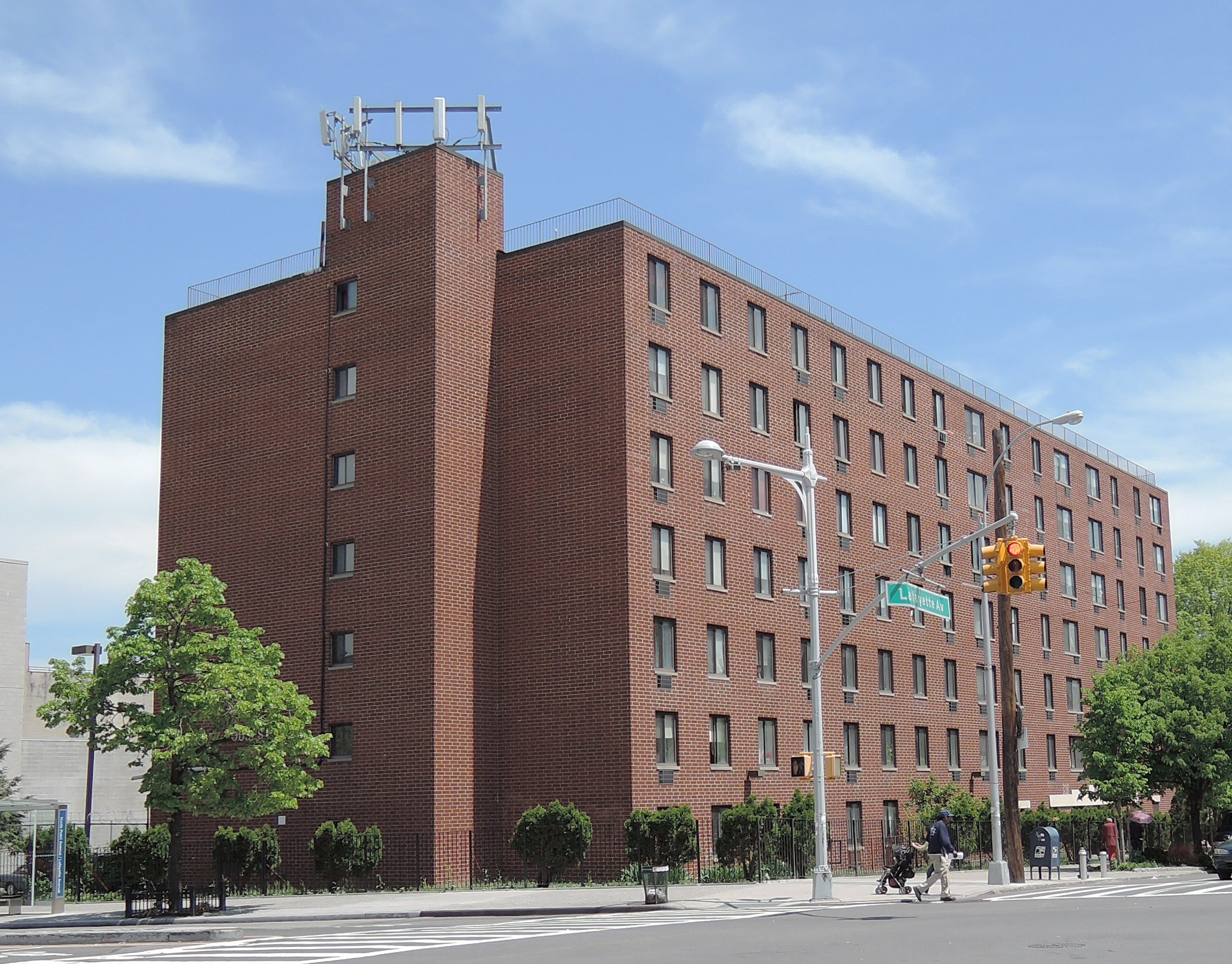
Housing at Lafayette Avenue

There is one New York City Housing Authority low-income housing development located in Hunts Point, Hunts Point Avenue Rehab, which includes thirteen rehabilitated tenement buildings, 4 and 5 stories tall.

== Institutions and organizations ==
=== Non-profits ===
There are several non-profits operating in this section of the South Bronx, most notably the Hunts Point Economic Development Corporation (HPEDC), Sustainable South Bronx (SSBx), THE POINT Community Development Corporation, Rocking the Boat, City Year, Legal Aid Society, Bronx Neighborhood Office, Mothers on the Move, Youth Ministries for Peace and Justice, Children's Bible Fellowship sponsored Revolution Church, Iridescent, the Hunts Point Alliance for Children, and South Bronx Overall Economic Development Corporation (SoBRO). Real Life Church, who has fed over 1,200 people in two years on Thanksgiving Day.

- The Hunts Point Economic Development Corporation (HPEDC) was established in 1988 as a not-for-profit economic development corporation with the aim of improving and enhancing the challenging Hunts Point business environment. Josephine Infante is the founder and executive director of HPEDC, which has worked with public and private agencies to obtain federal empowerment and empire state incentives to revitalize the Hunts Point industrial zone. Since HPEDC has monitored more than five hundred million dollars in public works projects, and worked with the city to relocate of the Fulton Fish Market in Manhattan to Hunts Point and thus consolidate the Hunts Point Food Distribution Center as a major generator of jobs in the Bronx. HPEDC partnered with the police to relocate the infamous "Fort Apache" 41st Precinct to a more central location in the community. In 1995 HPEDC successfully lobbied NYNEX to accelerate the investment of $51 million to upgrade telephone system for fiber optic lines underground. In 2005, the city and HPEDC inaugurated an employment and training center for Hunts Point. Despite no available records reflecting the training center's actual number of successful job placements, a permanent workforce program was approved for Hunts Point starting 2008. The Southern Boulevard Business Improvement District (BID), signed into law at the end of 2007, is a plan where commercial businesses join with property owners to develop and underwrite the cost of additional services to the retail area.
- The Legal Aid Society has provided free civil legal services to needy residents from its Bronx Neighborhood Office for over 20 years. It specializes in housing, government benefits, and matrimonial law.
- Rocking the Boat uses traditional wooden boat building and on-water education to help over 2,000 youth develop into empowered and responsible adults by assisting them in dealing with everyday realities that are often not addressed at home or in school. Five levels of community and youth development programs operate during the fall and spring academic semesters and over the summer. Rocking the Boat holds community rowing events on Fridays and Saturdays. Rocking the Boat's Hunts Point riverside site is located at the Jose E. Serrano Riverside Campus for Arts and the Environment, adjacent to Lafayette Park on the Bronx River.
- South Bronx Overall Economic Development Corporation (SoBRO) was founded in 1972 by a group of business executives and community leaders. Their mission was to reverse the flight of businesses and jobs from the South Bronx and rebuild the community. At the time it was known for burned out buildings, crime, poverty and drugs. SoBRO expanded its mission to address more aspects of community development: assisting local businesses to get started and grow, training residents according to the needs of employers, offering opportunities for youth to learn and develop, and creating affordable housing and commercial space that reverses blight in the community. SoBRO has been active in the neighboring Port Morris Industrial Business Zone for years helping businesses to secure government contracts and incentives, acquire low-interest loans, and expand their services and capacity.
- Sustainable South Bronx (SSBx) is an environmental justice organization, founded by Majora Carter, has brought government, corporate, and foundation money into the area to build two new waterfront parks along the Bronx River at Lafayette Avenue, and along the East River at the end of Tiffany Street, providing the first formalized waterfront access in 60 years. In addition, SSBx runs the Bronx Environmental Stewardship Training (BEST) program, which takes qualifying students through 10 weeks of intensive training covering everything from tree pruning and climbing to OSHA brownfield remediation to green roof installation and maintenance to estuary restoration to job/life skills. This program aims to give local residents a personal and financial stake in the management of their local environment. In December 2006, Mitsubishi Corporation contributed $150,000 to expand the program. In 2005, above their offices in the historic American Banknote Building SSBx built the SSBx Cool and Greenroof Demonstration Project, the first such roof in New York City. In 2007, SSBx launched the for-profit SmartRoofs, a green roof installation business.
- The Hunts Point Alliance for Children (HPAC) is a community-based organization, serving the families that live in the 10474 zip code. The mission of the Hunts Point Alliance for Children is to work with families and local organizations and schools to support the educational progress of the children of Hunts Point. HPAC serves two functions, first, to bring the seven neighborhood schools and nine child-serving non-profit organizations together in an Alliance. Secondly, HPAC provides direct educational enrichment and support services to Hunts Point families in four areas: Early Childhood Education, Youth Development, Academic Support and Education Transition Counseling, and Family Support Services.
- The POINT Community Development Corporation is a nonprofit organization dedicated to youth development, culture, and economic revitalization of the Hunt Point section of the Bronx. Their mission is to encourage the arts, local enterprise, responsible ecology, and self-investment in the Hunts Point community.

Prior to 2010, Per Scholas—a nonprofit that provides tuition-free technology training to unemployed or underemployed adults for careers as IT professionals—was also located in Hunts Point, within the American Bank Note building.

=== Cultural institutions ===
An urban arts scene is emerging in Hunts Point, with cultural institutions such as THE POINT Community Development Corporation, the Bronx Academy of Arts and Dance (BAAD), and MUD/BONE STUDIO 889. BAAD was formerly located in the historic Bank Note Building and have now since relocated to 2474 Westchester Avenue. THE POINT, which is located in a former bagel factory, provides performance art space, visual art galleries, after-school programs in the visual and performing arts for schoolchildren in the community, and community organizing around environmental improvement and infrastructure development in the neighborhood.

== Media ==
In 2006, an online news outlet The Hunts Point Express began reporting on Hunts Point and Longwood. It is written by students at Craig Newmark Graduate School of Journalism and its edited by Joe Hirsch.

As of 2023, the paper is exclusively digital. The Express previously printed and distributed it for free at community centers, clinics, and stores throughout the neighborhood.

== Police and crime ==
Hunts Point and Longwood are patrolled by the 41st Precinct of the NYPD, located at 1035 Longwood Avenue. The 41st Precinct ranked 67th safest out of 69 patrol areas for per-capita crime in 2010. As of 2018, with a non-fatal assault rate of 151 per 100,000 people, Hunts Point and Longwood's rate of violent crimes per capita is greater than that of the city as a whole. The incarceration rate of 1,036 per 100,000 people is higher than that of the city as a whole.

The 41st Precinct has a lower crime rate than in the 1990s, with crimes across all categories having decreased by 63.5% between 1990 and 2025. The precinct reported 3 murders, 43 rapes, 235 robberies, 342 felony assaults, 183 burglaries, 327 grand larcenies, and 148 grand larcenies auto in 2025.

The 41st Precinct was located at 1086 Simpson Street until 1993. During the 1980s, crime reached such a level that the Simpson Street building became known by the police as "Fort Apache", as was later immortalized in a 1981 movie named for it. The Simpson Street building currently houses the Bronx Detectives Bureau.

Hunts Point had suffered from crime and poverty for many years and was once part of the poorest congressional districts in the country, with almost half of the population living below the poverty line. Due to the lucrative drug trade in the area, many drug addicts reside in the community. The neighborhood has also been notorious for its prostitution industry since the 1980s. HBO has made four documentaries about prostitution in Hunts Point, Hookers at the Point, the most recent in April 2002. In 2008, a local news station released a two-part documentary on the life of several drug-addicted sex workers living on the streets of the neighborhood.

== Fire safety ==
Hunts Point contains a New York City Fire Department (FDNY) fire station, Engine Co. 94/Ladder Co. 48/Battalion 3, at 1226 Seneca Avenue.

== Health ==
As of 2018, preterm births and births to teenage mothers are more common in Hunts Point and Longwood than in other places citywide. In Hunts Point and Longwood, there were 101 preterm births per 1,000 live births (compared to 87 per 1,000 citywide), and 36.2 births to teenage mothers per 1,000 live births (compared to 19.3 per 1,000 citywide). Hunts Point and Longwood has a relatively high population of residents who are uninsured. In 2018, this population of uninsured residents was estimated to be 14%, slightly higher than the citywide rate of 12%.

The concentration of fine particulate matter, the deadliest type of air pollutant, in Hunts Point and Longwood is 0.0085 mg/m^{3} (8.5×10^{−9} oz/ft^{3}), more than the city average. Fifteen percent of Hunts Point and Longwood residents are smokers, which is higher than the city average of 14% of residents being smokers. In Hunts Point and Longwood, 42% of residents are obese, 20% are diabetic, and 38% have high blood pressure—compared to the citywide averages of 24%, 11%, and 28% respectively. In addition, 26% of children are obese, compared to the citywide average of 20%.

Eighty-two percent of residents eat some fruits and vegetables every day, which is less than the city's average of 87%. In 2018, 72% of residents described their health as "good", "very good", or "excellent", lower than the city's average of 78%. For every supermarket in Hunts Point and Longwood, there are 20 bodegas.

The nearest hospital is NYC Health + Hospitals/Lincoln in Melrose.

Hunts Point is part of "Asthma Alley" along with the Mott Haven and Port Harris neighborhoods. residents of these neighborhoods are disproportionately affected by air pollution from high levels of truck traffic as well as pollution from the Hunts Point wastewater plant. According to data from 2023, adults and children of Hunts Point experienced higher rates of hospitalization due to asthma than the NYC average, with many of them being from minority groups. In addition,according to 2022 city data, had a higher level of fine particulate matter per cubic meter than the city average. Fine particulate matter comes from exhaust and can cause various health issues including cancer. In the 21st century, efforts to mitigate air pollution have largely focused on switching out diesel trucks for electric vehicles and providing the infrastructure needed to support electric vehicles, through advocacy projects like "The Bronx is Breathing" and government initiatives

== Post office and ZIP Code ==
Hunts Point is covered by the ZIP Code 10474. The United States Postal Service operates the Hunts Point Station at 800 Manida Street.

== Education ==
Hunts Point and Longwood generally have a lower rate of college-educated residents than the rest of the city as of 2018. While 16% of residents age 25 and older have a college education or higher, 41% have less than a high school education and 43% are high school graduates or have some college education. By contrast, 26% of Bronx residents and 43% of city residents have a college education or higher. The percentage of Hunts Point and Longwood students excelling in math rose from 24% in 2000 to 26% in 2011, and reading achievement increased from 28% to 32% during the same time period.

Hunts Point and Longwood's rate of elementary school student absenteeism is more than the rest of New York City. In Hunts Point and Longwood, 35% of elementary school students missed twenty or more days per school year, higher than the citywide average of 20%. Additionally, 58% of high school students in Hunts Point and Longwood graduate on time, lower than the citywide average of 75%.

=== Schools ===
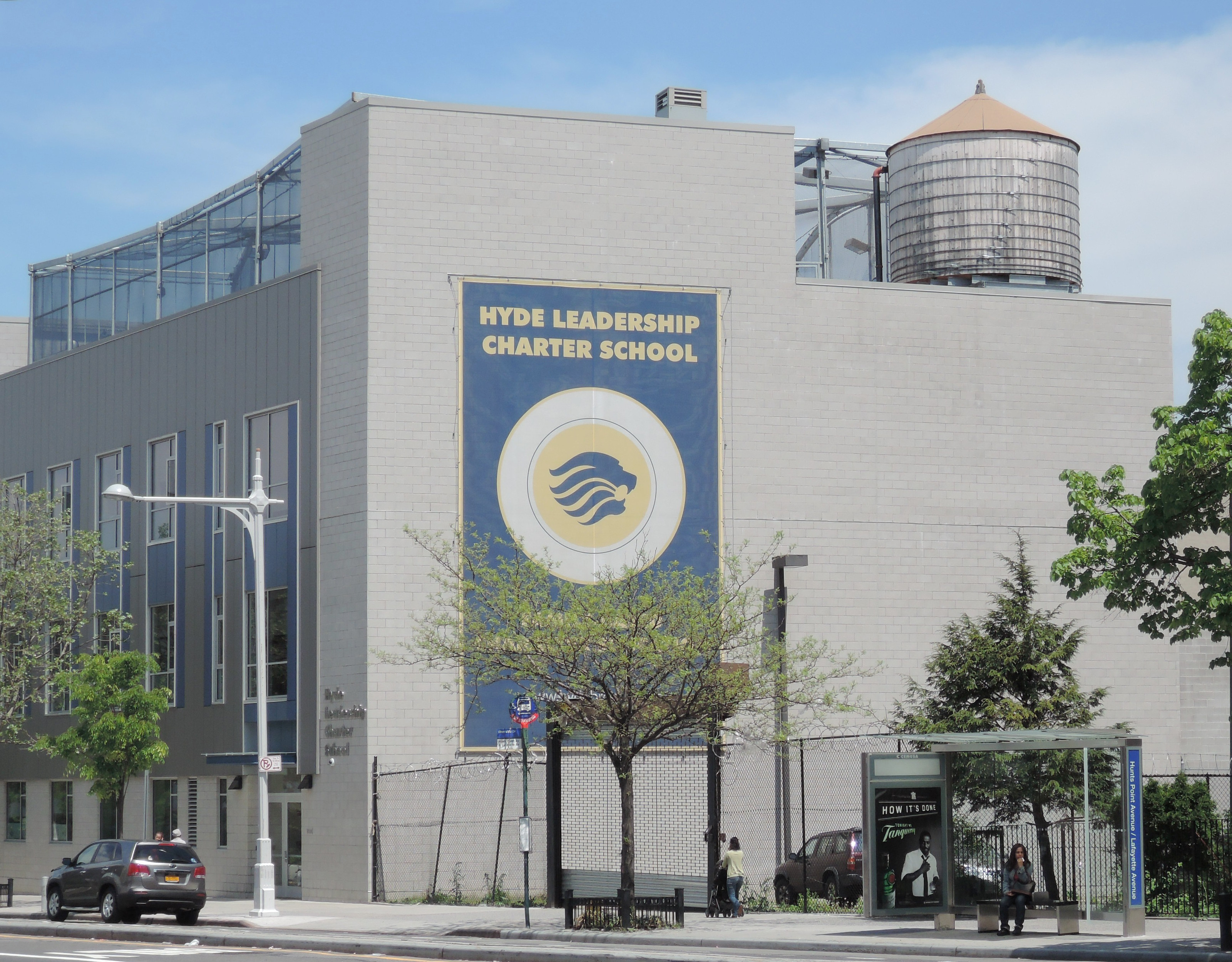
Hyde Leadership Charter School

The Bronx Charter School for the Arts, the Bronx Lighthouse Charter School, Hyde Leadership Charter School, the South Bronx Classical Charter School, and UA Bronx Studio School for Writers and Artists are located in Hunts Point. In September 2011, Hyde Leadership Charter School opened on Hunts Point Avenue, the first college preparatory high school to open in Hunts Point in nearly 30 years.

Other schools include the John V. Lindsay Wildcat Academy Charter School, MS201 Theatre Arts & RSCH (As of 2008, it is now known as MS 424), P352 at 201 Vida Bogart School, PS 352, PS 48 Joseph R Drake, St. Ignatius School and Wildcat Second Opportunity School. IS 217, the School of Performing Arts, is also located in Hunts Point on Tiffany Street.

=== Library ===
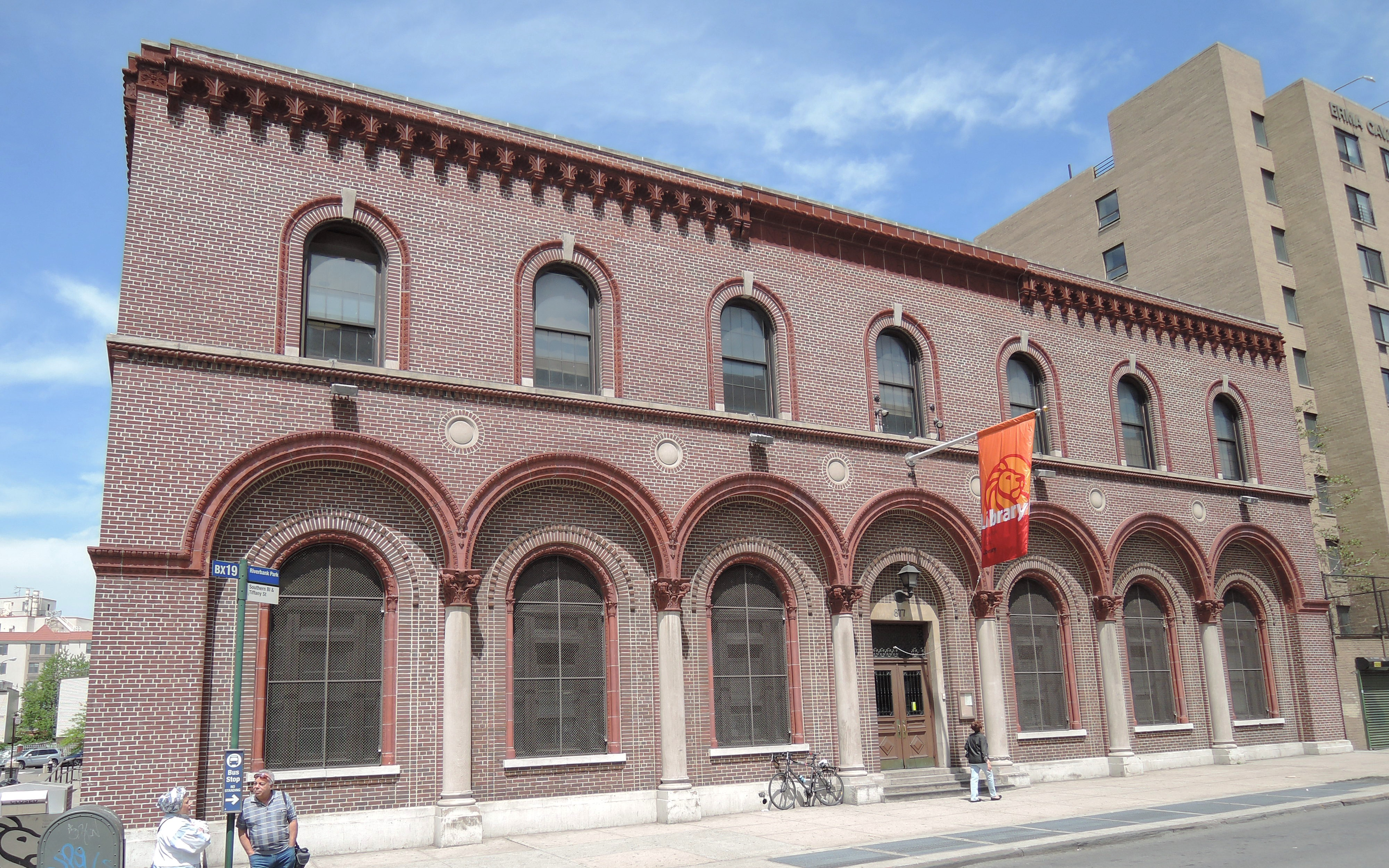
New York Public Library, Hunts Point branch

The New York Public Library operates the Hunts Point branch at 877 Southern Boulevard in Longwood, near Hunts Point. The Hunts Point library, a Carnegie library designed by Carrère and Hastings in the Italian Renaissance style, was opened in 1929. It was the last Carnegie library built for the New York Public Library system and is a New York City designated landmark.

== Transportation ==
The following New York City Subway stations serve Hunts Point:

- Longwood Avenue (6 train)
- Hunts Point Avenue (6 and <6> trains)

The following MTA Regional Bus Operations bus routes serve Hunts Point:

- Bx5 to Co-op City and Bay Plaza Shopping Center (via Bruckner Blvd and Story Avenue)
- Bx6 and Bx6 Select Bus Service to Washington Heights or Hunts Point Cooperative Market (via Hunts Point Avenue)
- Bx46 to Longwood or Hunts Point Cooperative Market (via Longwood Avenue and Tiffany Street)
