= Intervale Avenue station =

New York City Subway station in the Bronx

Intervale Avenue
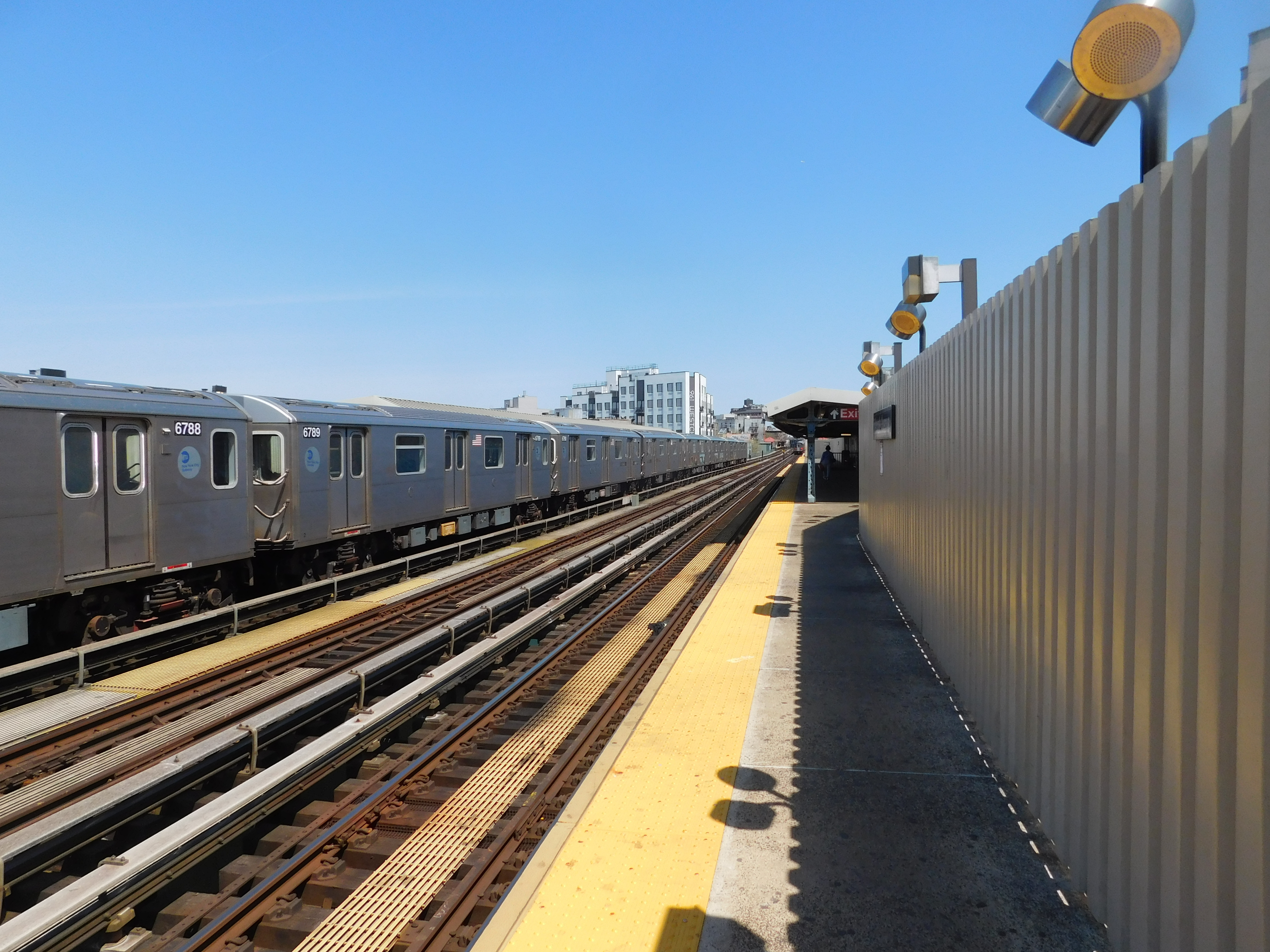
- Southbound R142 train at the station

Station statistics
- Address: Intervale Avenue & Westchester Avenue; Bronx, New York
- Borough: The Bronx
- Locale: Longwood
- Coordinates: 40.822°N 73.897°W
- Division: A (IRT)
- Line: IRT White Plains Road Line
- Services: 2 (all times); 5 (all times except rush hours in the peak direction and late nights)
- Transit: NYCT Bus: Bx4, Bx6, Bx6 SBS
- Structure: Elevated
- Platforms: 2 side platforms
- Tracks: 3

Other information
- Opened: April 30, 1910; 116 years ago
- Rebuilt: April 21, 1992; 34 years ago (re-opened after 1989 fire)
- Former/other names: Intervale Avenue–163rd Street

Traffic
- 2025: 670,044 ▲23.2%
- Rank: 359 out of 423
Services
Preceding station	New York City Subway	Following station
Simpson Street 2 5 via East 180th Street	Local	Prospect Avenue 2 5 toward Flatbush Avenue–Brooklyn College
Location
Location within New York City Subway
Location within New York City
Location within New York
Track layout
Street map
Station service legend
Symbol	Description
Stops all times except rush hours in the peak direction	Stops all times except rush hours in the peak direction
Stops all times	Stops all times

The Intervale Avenue station (formerly the Intervale Avenue–163rd Street station) is a local station on the IRT White Plains Road Line of the New York City Subway. Located at the intersection of Intervale and Westchester Avenues in the Longwood neighborhood of the Bronx within Intervale Valley, it is served by the 2 train at all times, and the 5 train at all times except late nights and rush hours in the peak direction.

== History ==
=== Early history ===
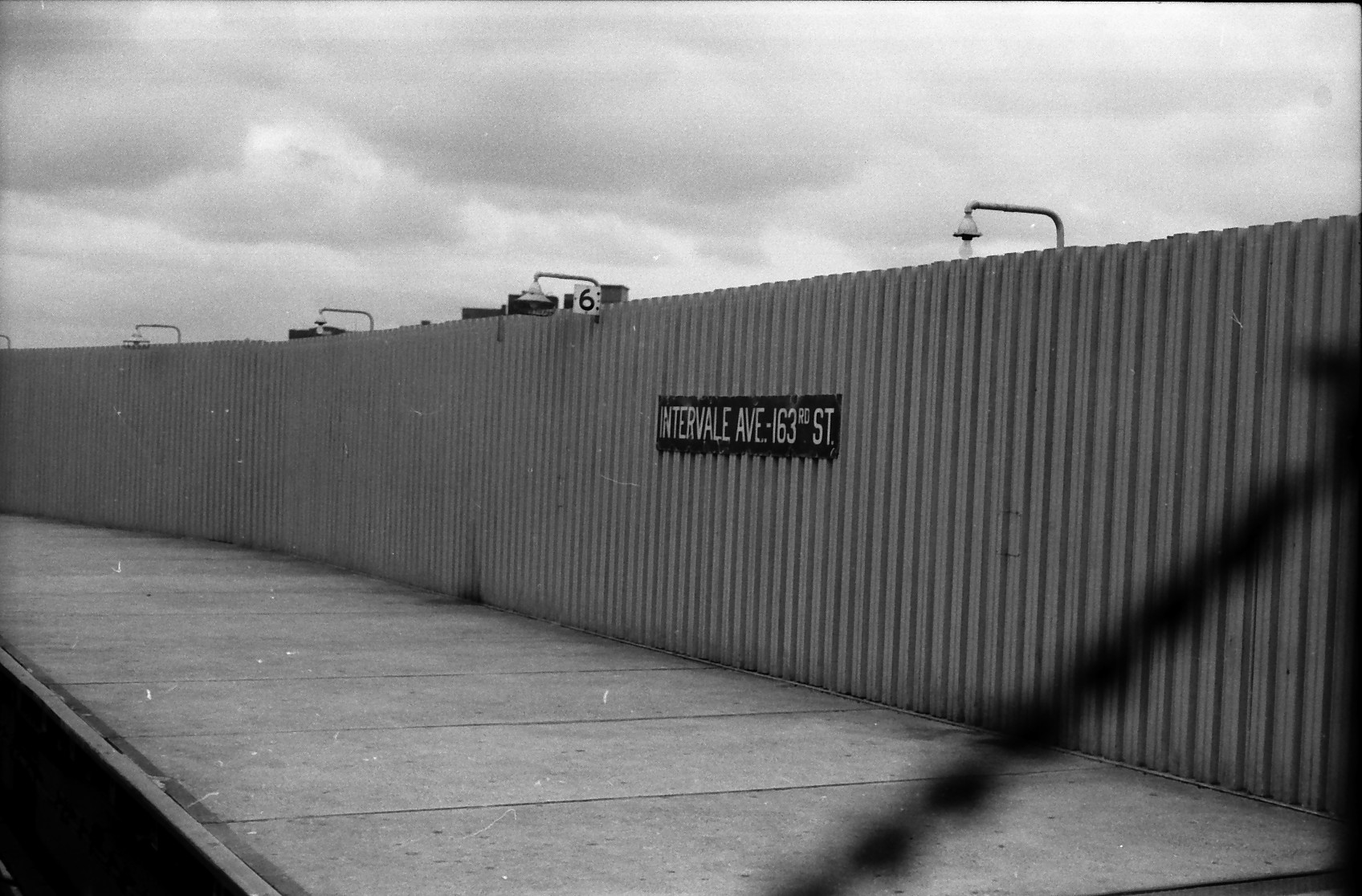
Platform with the former name from 1977.

The initial segment of the IRT White Plains Road Line opened on November 26, 1904 between 180th Street–Bronx Park and Jackson Avenue. The Intervale Avenue station opened on April 30, 1910 as an infill station on the White Plains Road Line, and was the first station in the Bronx with escalators. It was built at the cost of $100,000, which was paid with private capital. The station was originally served by trains from the IRT Second Avenue Line and the IRT Third Avenue Line, both now demolished. In addition, IRT Lenox Avenue Line trains also stopped at this station.

=== 1930s and 1940s ===
The New York State Transit Commission announced plans to extend the southbound platforms at seven stations on the line from Jackson Avenue to 177th Street to accommodate ten-car trains for $81,900 on August 8, 1934. The platform at Intervale Avenue would be lengthened from 433 feet (132 m) to 481 feet (147 m).

The city government took over the IRT's operations on June 12, 1940. The Bergen Avenue cutoff, which allowed Third Avenue trains to access the White Plains Road Line, was abandoned on November 5, 1946, as part of the gradual curtailment of elevated service on the IRT Third Avenue Line. On June 13, 1949, the platform extensions at this station, as well as those on White Plains Road Line stations between Jackson Avenue and 177th Street, opened. The platforms were lengthened to 514 feet (157 m) to allow full ten-car express trains to open their doors. Previously the stations could only accommodate six-car local trains.

=== Station house arson ===
On March 15, 1989, three men set the wooden station house on fire after a failed attempt to rob the token booth. The clerk was not seriously injured, while the suspects fled and were never identified.

After the incident, New York City Transit considered closing this station indefinitely due to its close proximity to Prospect Avenue and Simpson Street. However, a community uproar led to the scrapping of the plans. The station was rebuilt with steel canopies and windscreens and a concrete station house with glass block windows and embossed leather-looking walls. Renovations took two and a half years. Artwork called El 2/El 5 by Michael Kelly Williams was installed in the mezzanine and features two mosaic murals depicting underground and elevated tracks. The renovated station reopened on April 21, 1992 after twenty months of work was completed.

== Station layout ==
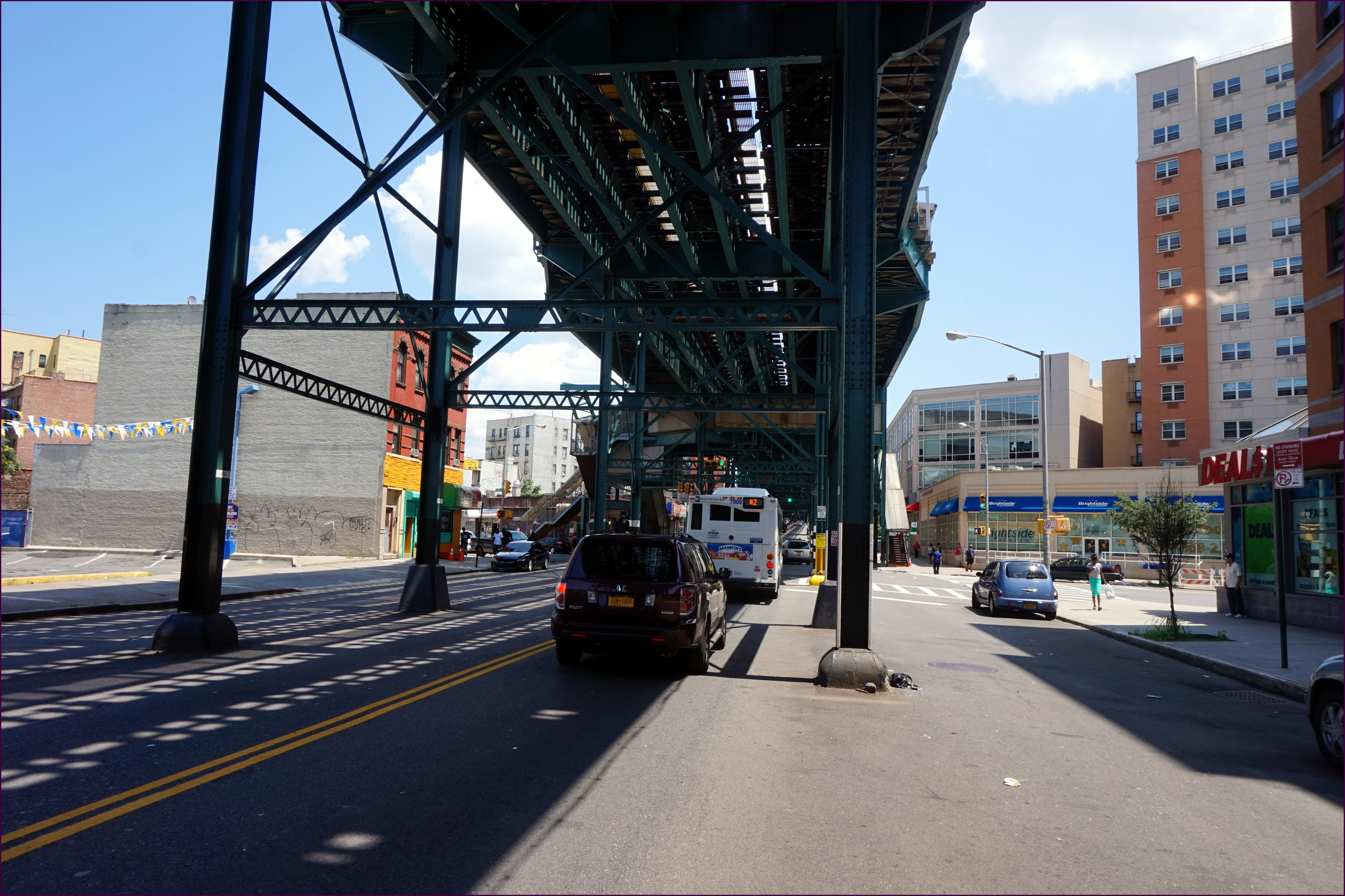
Underneath the station

This elevated station has three tracks and two side platforms. The center express track is used by the 5 train during rush hours in the peak direction. Both platforms have beige windscreens that run along the entire length and brown canopies with green frames and support columns in the center.

=== Exits ===
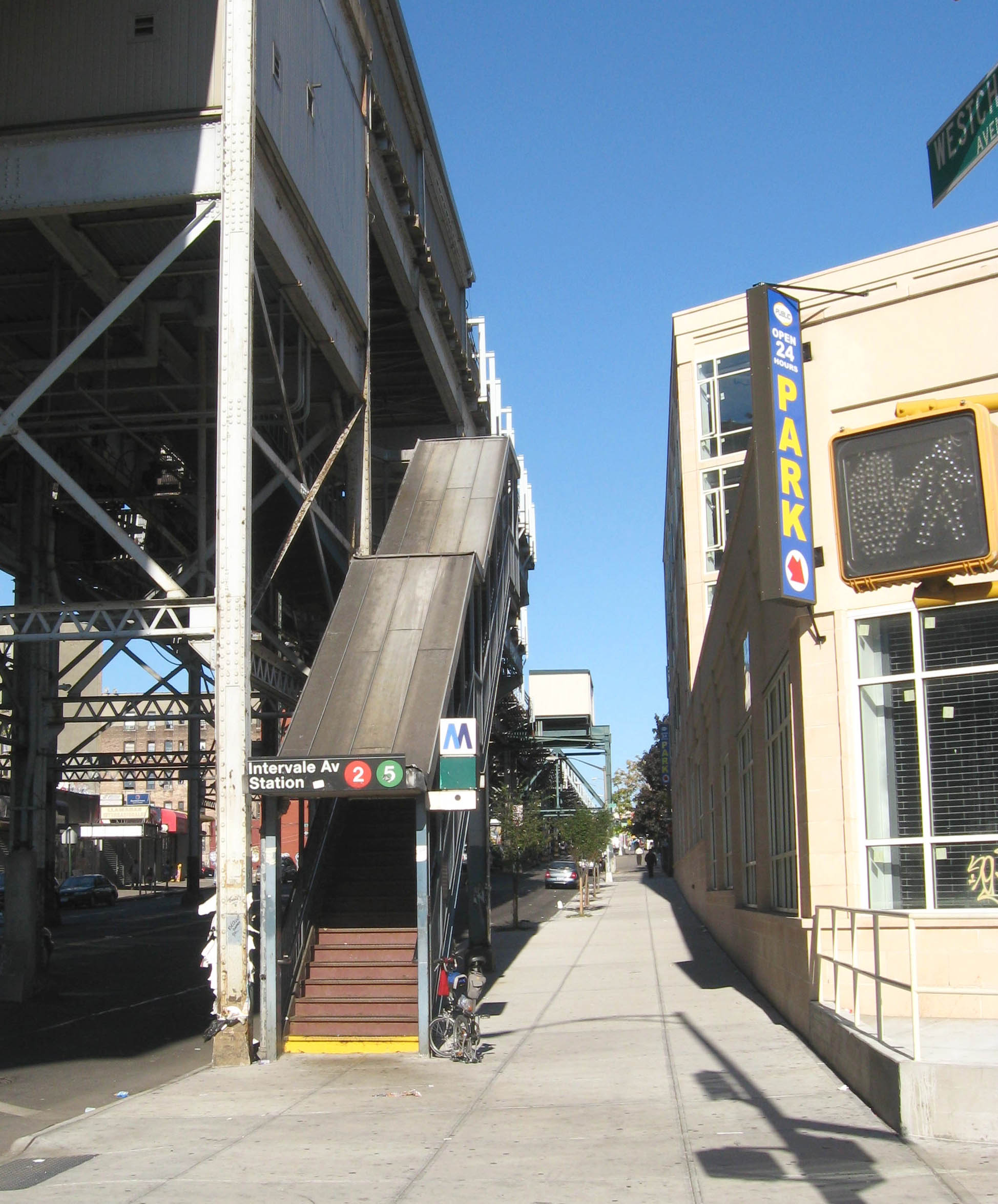
Entrance

The station's only entrance is an elevated station house beneath the tracks. Inside fare control, it has two staircases to the center of each platform and a waiting area that allows a free transfer between directions. Outside fare control, there is a turnstile bank, token booth, one staircase going down to the southeast corner of Intervale and Westchester Avenues, and one staircase and one enclosed escalator (both perpendicular from each other) going down to the northeast corner.
