= List of bus routes in the Bronx =

Bus routes in New York City

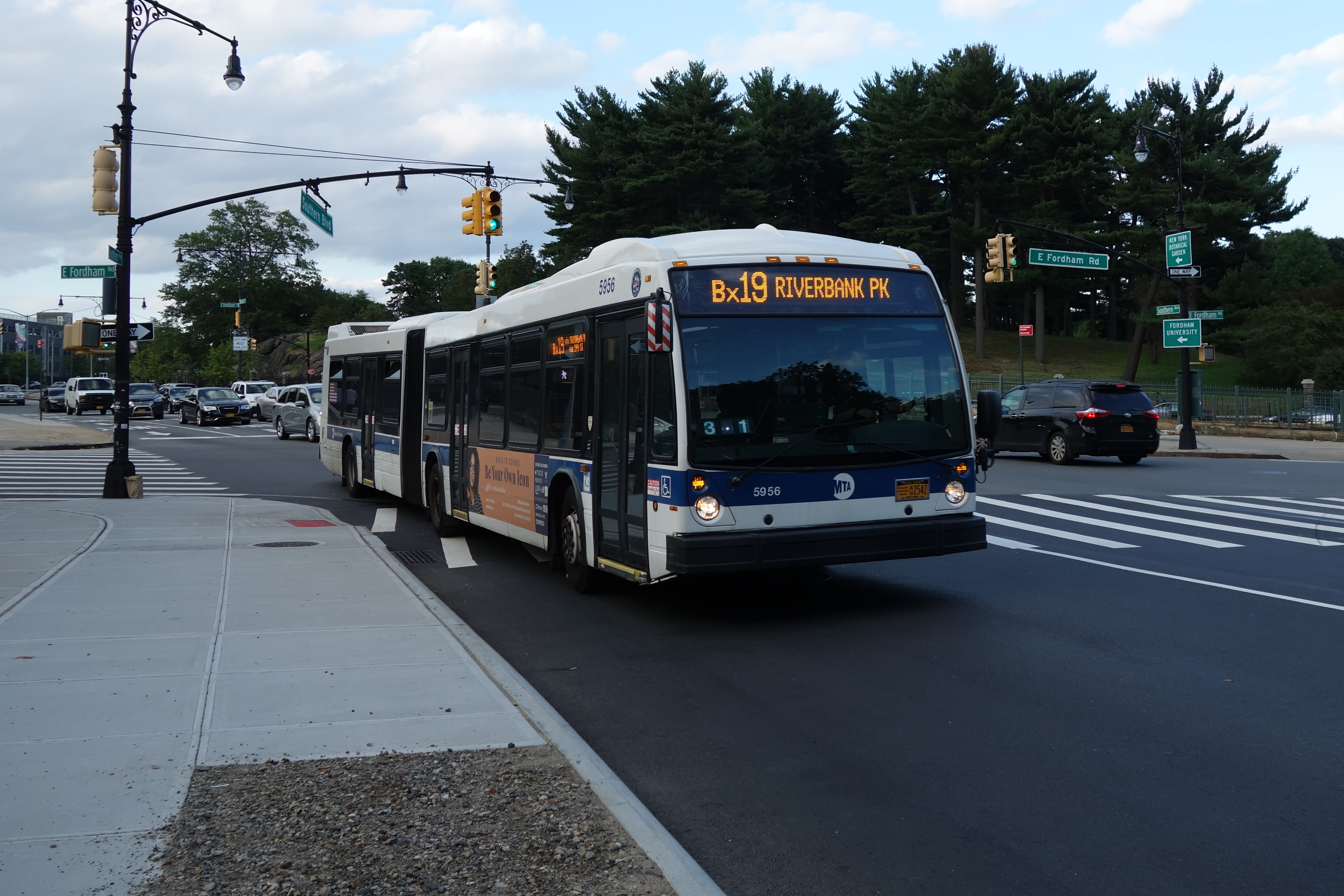
An articulated Nova Bus LFS on the Riverbank State Park-bound Bx19 at Southern Boulevard/Fordham Road in September 2018

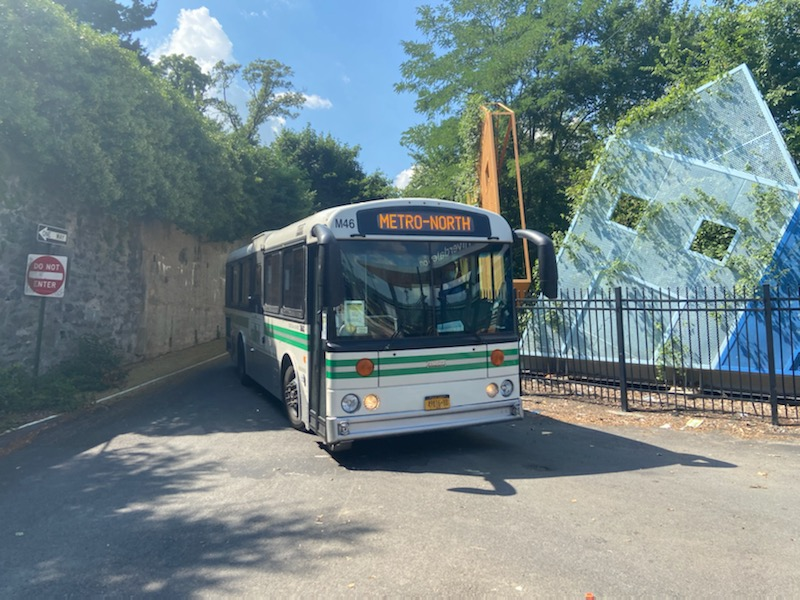
A Hudson Rail Link bus departing Riverdale station on Route C

The Metropolitan Transportation Authority (MTA) operates a number of bus routes in the Bronx, New York, United States. Many of them are the direct descendants of streetcar lines (see list of streetcar lines in the Bronx). All local buses are operated by the Manhattan and Bronx Surface Transit Operating Authority, except for the Bx23, which is operated by the MTA Bus Company.

Eight Metro-North Railroad feeder routes are operated by Consolidated Bus Transit to and from the Riverdale and Spuyten Duyvil stations, under contract with the brand name of Hudson Rail Link.

== List of routes ==
This table gives details for the routes prefixed with "Bx" - in other words, those considered to run primarily in the Bronx by the MTA. For details on routes with other prefixes, see the following articles:

- List of bus routes in Manhattan: M125
- List of bus routes in Queens: Q44 Select Bus Service, Q50, Q100
- List of express bus routes in New York City: BxM1, BxM2, BxM3, BxM4, BxM6, BxM7, BxM8, BxM9, BxM10, BxM11, BxM18
- List of bus routes in Westchester County: Bee-Line 1, 2, 3, 4, 8, 20, 21, 25, 26, 40, 41, 42, 43, 45, 52, 54, 55, 60, 61, 62.

All routes are operated under New York City Bus except for the Bx23, which is operated under MTA Bus. Routes marked with an asterisk (*) run 24 hours a day. Connections to New York City Subway stations at the bus routes' terminals are also listed where applicable.

=== Routes Bx1 to Bx22 ===
Route	Terminals			Primary streets traveled	Notes
Bx1	Local Service (Bx1 Weekday/Saturday Early Mornings and Evenings, and Sundays; Bx2 All Day)				
Bx1	Limited-Stop Service (Bx1 Weekdays and Saturdays)				
Bx1	Mott Haven; East 138th Street and Lincoln Avenue at Third Avenue–138th Street ( trains)	↔	Riverdale; West 231st Street and Riverdale Avenue	Grand Concourse, Sedgwick Avenue, West 231st Street	Local service does not operate when Limited-Stop Service is running.; Limited-Stop Service does not operate during the evenings and Sundays.; Select Riverdale-bound buses short-turn at the Fordham Road station ( trains).
Bx2	Mott Haven; East 138th Street and Lincoln Avenue at Third Avenue–138th Street ( trains)	↔	Kingsbridge Heights; Sedgwick Avenue and Fort Independence Street	East 149th Street, Grand Concourse, Sedgwick Avenue	Extended to Riverdale early weekday and Sunday mornings.; Some Sedgwick Avenue-bound service terminates at Jerome Avenue.
Bx3	Washington Heights, Manhattan; George Washington Bridge Bus Station	↔	Riverdale; West 238th Street and Broadway at 238th Street station ( train)	West 181st Street, University Avenue, Sedgwick Avenue	Select Washington Heights-bound buses terminate at University Avenue and 174th Street and select Riverdale-bound buses at Kingsbridge Road.
Bx4	The Hub; Bergen Avenue and Westchester Avenue at Third Avenue–149th Street ( trains)	↔	Westchester Square; Lane Avenue and East Tremont Avenue at Westchester Square–East Tremont Avenue ( trains)	Westchester Avenue	
Bx4A	Longwood; West Farms Road and Southern Boulevard at Simpson Street ( trains)	↔	Westchester Square; Lane Avenue and East Tremont Avenue at Westchester Square–East Tremont Avenue ( trains)	Westchester Avenue, Metropolitan Avenue, East Tremont Avenue	
Bx5	Longwood; West Farms Road and Southern Boulevard at Simpson Street ( trains)	↔	Pelham Bay; Bruckner Boulevard at Pelham Bay Park ( trains)	Story Avenue, Bruckner Boulevard	Alternate weekday and all weeknight services terminate at Turnbull Avenue and Pugsley Avenue.; Weekend service is extended to Bay Plaza.
Bx5	Longwood; West Farms Road and Southern Boulevard at Simpson Street ( trains)	↔	Co-op City; Bay Plaza Shopping Center	Story Avenue, Bruckner Boulevard	Alternate weekday and all weeknight services terminate at Turnbull Avenue and Pugsley Avenue.; Weekend service is extended to Bay Plaza.
Bx6*	Local Service				
Bx6*	Select Bus Service (All Day)				
Bx6*	Washington Heights, Manhattan; Riverside Drive West and West 158th Street	↔	Hunts Point Cooperative Market	West 155th Street, East 161st, East 163rd Streets, Hunts Point Avenue	Select Bus Service does not operate overnight.; Local service runs all times, overnight service terminates at Amsterdam Avenue and West 155th Street in Manhattan.; Some Hunts Point-bound buses may terminate at Southern Boulevard.
Bx7	Washington Heights, Manhattan; St. Nicholas Avenue and West 167th Street at 168th Street ( trains)	↔	Riverdale; Riverdale Avenue and West 263rd Street	Broadway, Riverdale Avenue	Late evening service and select day trips terminate at West 207th Street and Broadway in Manhattan.
Bx8	Locust Point; Longstreet Avenue and Tierney Place	↔	Williamsbridge; East 226th Street and White Plains Road at 225th Street ( trains)	Throgs Neck Boulevard, Crosby Avenue, Williamsbridge Road, Bronxwood Avenue	Some rush hour trips terminate/originate at Westchester Square, including early morning and late evening trips.
Bx9*	Riverdale; Broadway and West 262nd Street	↔	West Farms; Tremont Avenue and Boston Road at West Farms Square–East Tremont Avenue ( trains)	Broadway, Kingsbridge Road, Fordham Road, Southern Boulevard	Numerous trips originate or terminate at the Marble Hill–225th Street station ( train).
Bx10*	Norwood; East 206th Street and Bainbridge Avenue at Norwood–205th Street ( train)	↔	Riverdale; Riverdale Avenue and West 263rd Street	Jerome Avenue, Bailey Avenue, West 231st Street, Riverdale Avenue	Select trips originate or terminate at 231st and Broadway ( train).
Bx11*	Washington Heights, Manhattan; George Washington Bridge Bus Station: West 178th Street	↔	Parkchester; Hugh Grant Circle at Parkchester ( trains)	170th Street, Claremont Parkway, East 174th Street	
Bx12*	Local Service				
Bx12*	Select Bus Service (All Day)				
Bx12*	Inwood, Manhattan; Broadway and Isham Street at Inwood–207th Street ( train)	↔	Co-op City; Bay Plaza Shopping Center	Inwood trips: West 207th Street; All trips: Fordham Road, Pelham Parkway	Select Bus Service operates at all times except nights.; Overnight local service.; Local buses serve Orchard Beach only during the summer.
Bx12*	Inwood, Manhattan; Broadway and Isham Street at Inwood–207th Street ( train)	↔	Co-op City; Edson Avenue and Bartow Avenue	Inwood trips: West 207th Street; All trips: Fordham Road, Pelham Parkway	Select Bus Service operates at all times except nights.; Overnight local service.; Local buses serve Orchard Beach only during the summer.
Bx12*	University Heights; West Fordham Road and Sedgwick Avenue	↔	Pelham Bay; Bruckner Boulevard at Pelham Bay Park ( trains)	Inwood trips: West 207th Street; All trips: Fordham Road, Pelham Parkway	Select Bus Service operates at all times except nights.; Overnight local service.; Local buses serve Orchard Beach only during the summer.
Bx12*	University Heights; West Fordham Road and Sedgwick Avenue	↔	Orchard Beach	Inwood trips: West 207th Street; All trips: Fordham Road, Pelham Parkway	Select Bus Service operates at all times except nights.; Overnight local service.; Local buses serve Orchard Beach only during the summer.
Bx13	Washington Heights, Manhattan; George Washington Bridge Bus Station	↔	Bronx Terminal Market; East 149th Street and River Avenue	West 181st Street, Ogden Avenue, then: Melrose trips: East 161st Street; Bronx Terminal Market trips: River Avenue	Service to Melrose operates during AM rush hours only.; Some AM rush hour trips originate at Ogden Avenue and University Avenue.; Some AM rush hour trips operate to Yankee Stadium.; Numerous weekday trips toward the GWB terminal from approximately 2:25 pm to 8:15 pm terminate at Edward L. Grant Highway and University Avenue.; Some pm rush hour trips originate at Yankee Stadium instead of the Market.
Bx13	Washington Heights, Manhattan; George Washington Bridge Bus Station	↔	Melrose; East 163rd Street and Third Avenue	West 181st Street, Ogden Avenue, then: Melrose trips: East 161st Street; Bronx Terminal Market trips: River Avenue	Service to Melrose operates during AM rush hours only.; Some AM rush hour trips originate at Ogden Avenue and University Avenue.; Some AM rush hour trips operate to Yankee Stadium.; Numerous weekday trips toward the GWB terminal from approximately 2:25 pm to 8:15 pm terminate at Edward L. Grant Highway and University Avenue.; Some pm rush hour trips originate at Yankee Stadium instead of the Market.
Bx15*	Local Service				
Bx15*	Limited-Stop Service (Weekdays)				
Bx15*	The Hub; 149th Street and Third Avenue at Third Avenue–149th Street station ( trains)	↔	Fordham; Fordham Plaza (at Fordham Metro-North station)	Third Avenue	Limited-Stop Service weekdays, local service all times.; Some Fordham Plaza-bound buses may terminate at Claremont Parkway.
Bx16	Norwood; East 206th Street and Bainbridge Avenue at Norwood–205th Street ( train)	↔	Eastchester; Ropes Avenue and Boston Road	Bainbridge Avenue, East 233rd Street, Nereid Avenue	
Bx17	Mott Haven; St. Ann's Avenue and East 135th Street	↔	Fordham; Fordham Plaza (at Fordham Metro-North station)	St. Ann's Avenue, Prospect Avenue, Crotona Avenue	Select Mott Haven-bound buses may terminate at Tremont Avenue.
Bx18A	Morrisania; East 170th Street and Grand Concourse at 170th Street station ( trains)	↺	Morris Heights; Undercliff Loop	Macombs Road, Undercliff Avenue, West 168th Street	Alternate buses serve each loop.; Fare-free service for six to 12 months started on September 24, 2023, and ended August 31, 2024.
Bx18B	Morrisania; East 170th Street and Grand Concourse at 170th Street station ( trains)	↻	Highbridge; Sedgwick Loop	West 168th Street, Sedgwick Avenue, Macombs Road	Alternate buses serve each loop.; Fare-free service for six to 12 months started on September 24, 2023, and ended August 31, 2024.
Bx19*	Riverbank State Park, Manhattan	↔	Bronx Park; New York Botanical Garden; Southern Boulevard	West 145th Street, East 149th Street, Southern Boulevard	Select Bronx-bound buses terminate at Tremont Avenue.
Bx19*	Harlem, Manhattan; 145th Street and Broadway at 145th Street ( train)	↔	Bronx Park; New York Botanical Garden; Southern Boulevard	West 145th Street, East 149th Street, Southern Boulevard	Overnight service.
Bx20	Inwood, Manhattan; Broadway and Isham Street at Inwood–207th Street ( train)	↔	Riverdale; Henry Hudson Parkway and West 246th Street	Broadway, Johnson Avenue, Henry Hudson Parkway	Weekday rush hour service only.
Bx21*	Mott Haven; East 138th Street and Lincoln Avenue at Third Avenue–138th Street ( trains)	↔	Westchester Square; Westchester Avenue and Lane Avenue at Westchester Square–East Tremont Avenue ( trains)	Third Avenue, Boston Road, Morris Park Avenue	Select Mott Haven-bound trips begin at Boston Road and East Tremont Avenue and may terminate at 149th Street.; Select Westchester Square-bound trips terminate at East Tremont Ave.
Bx22*	Castle Hill; Castle Hill Avenue and Zerega Avenue	↔	Fordham; Fordham Road and Valentine Avenue	All trips: Castle Hill Avenue, White Plains Road, Fordham Road; Bedford Park trips: Kingsbridge Road, Goulden Avenue	These trips operate at all times except overnight hours, alternates with weekday Bedford Park trips.
Bx22*	Castle Hill; Castle Hill Avenue and Zerega Avenue	↔	Bedford Park; Paul Avenue and West 205th Street	All trips: Castle Hill Avenue, White Plains Road, Fordham Road; Bedford Park trips: Kingsbridge Road, Goulden Avenue	These trips operate during weekday daytime hours only, alternates with Fordham Center trips.
Bx22*	Castle Hill; Castle Hill Avenue and Zerega Avenue	↔	Pelham Parkway; Pelham Parkway and Boston Road	All trips: Castle Hill Avenue, White Plains Road, Fordham Road; Bedford Park trips: Kingsbridge Road, Goulden Avenue	Overnight service only.

=== Routes Bx23 to Bx46 ===
Route	Terminals			Primary streets traveled	Notes
Bx23	Pelham Bay; Bruckner Boulevard at Pelham Bay Park ( trains)	↻	Co-op City; Sections 1-2-3-4-5 (clockwise)	Baychester Avenue, Co-op City Boulevard, Hutchinson River Parkway	Alternate buses serve each direction of the loop.; Operated by MTA Bus.
Bx23	Pelham Bay; Bruckner Boulevard at Pelham Bay Park ( trains)	↺	Co-op City; Sections 5-4-3-2-1 (counter-clockwise)	Baychester Avenue, Co-op City Boulevard, Hutchinson River Parkway	Alternate buses serve each direction of the loop.; Operated by MTA Bus.
Bx24*	Hutchinson Metro Center; 911 Call Center	↔	Country Club; Ampere Avenue and Research Avenue	Marconi Street, Westchester Avenue, Bruckner Boulevard, Country Club Road	Overnight service operates between Pelham Bay Park and Hutchinson Metro Center.
Bx25	Bedford Park; Paul Avenue and West 205th Street	↔	Co-op City; Bay Plaza Shopping Center	Bedford Park Boulevard, Allerton Avenue, Co-op City Boulevard	Operates in Co-op City via sections 1-2-3, then runs to Bay Plaza Shopping Center.
Bx26	Bedford Park; Paul Avenue and West 205th Street	↔	Co-op City; Earhart Lane and Erskine Place	Bedford Park Boulevard, Allerton Avenue	Serves Co-op City sections 4 and 5.
Bx27*	Soundview; Soundview Ferry Terminal	↔	Longwood; West Farms Road and Southern Boulevard at Simpson Street ( trains)	Soundview Avenue, Rosedale Avenue, Westchester Avenue	Trips alternate between Ferry Terminal and Pugsley Avenue terminals except during overnight hours.
Bx27*	Clason Point; Soundview Avenue and Pugsley Avenue	↔	Longwood; West Farms Road and Southern Boulevard at Simpson Street ( trains)	Soundview Avenue, Rosedale Avenue, Westchester Avenue	Trips alternate between Ferry Terminal and Pugsley Avenue terminals except during overnight hours.
Bx27*	Clason Point; Soundview Avenue and Pugsley Avenue	↔	Soundview; Morrison Avenue and Westchester Avenue at Morrison Avenue–Soundview ( train)	Soundview Avenue, Rosedale Avenue, Westchester Avenue	Evening and overnight service.
Bx28*	Fordham; East Kingsbridge Road and East 192nd Street	↔	Co-op City; Earhart Lane and Erskine Place	Mosholu Parkway, Gun Hill Road, Bartow Avenue	Serves Co-op City sections 4 and 5.; Select weekday trips begin at Bay Plaza Shopping Center.
Bx28*	Norwood; Bainbridge Avenue and East 206th Street	↔	Co-op City; Earhart Lane and Erskine Place	Mosholu Parkway, Gun Hill Road, Bartow Avenue	Overnight service.; Serves all sections of Co-op City.
Bx29*	City Island; City Island Avenue and Rochelle Street	↔	Pelham Bay; Bruckner Boulevard at Pelham Bay Park station ( trains)	City Island Avenue, City Island Road	
Bx30	Pelham Parkway; Boston Road and Pelham Parkway at Pelham Parkway ( trains)	↔	Co-op City; Earhart Lane and Erskine Place	Boston Road, Baychester Avenue, Bartow Avenue	Serves Co-op City sections 1, 4, 5.
Bx31	Westchester Square; Lane Avenue and East Tremont Avenue at Westchester Square ( trains)	↔	Woodlawn; Katonah Avenue and East 242nd Street	Eastchester Road, East 233rd Street	
Bx32	Mott Haven; East 138th Street and Lincoln Avenue at Third Avenue–138th Street ( trains)	↔	Kingsbridge Heights; Bronx VA Medical Center	Morris Avenue, Jerome Avenue	
Bx33	Harlem, Manhattan; West 135th Street and St. Nicholas Avenue at 135th Street ( trains)	↔	Port Morris; Walnut Avenue and East 132nd Street	West 135th Street, East 138th Street	
Bx34	Fordham; Valentine Avenue and Fordham Road at Fordham Road ( train)	↔	Woodlawn; Katonah Avenue and East 242nd Street	Bainbridge Avenue, East 233rd Street	Select Woodlawn-bound buses terminate at Jerome Avenue.
Bx35*	Washington Heights, Manhattan; George Washington Bridge Bus Station: West 179th Street	↔	Longwood; Jennings Street and West Farms Road	Edward L. Grant Highway, East 167th Street, East 168th Street, East 169th Street	Select Manhattan-bound buses terminate at University Avenue and West 174th Street.
Bx36*	Local Service				
Bx36*	Limited-Stop Service (Weekday Rush Hours)				
Bx36*	Washington Heights, Manhattan; George Washington Bridge Bus Station: West 178th Street	↔	Castle Hill; Olmstead Avenue and Randall Avenue	Tremont Avenue, White Plains Road	Limited-Stop Service operates weekday rush hours only.; Select local trips originate/terminate at Boston Road and East Tremont Avenue.; Select Limited trips terminate at Edward L. Grant Highway.
Bx38	Norwood; East 206th Street and Bainbridge Avenue at Norwood–205th Street ( train)	↔	Co-op City; Bay Plaza Shopping Center	Jerome Avenue, Gun Hill Road, Co-op City Boulevard	Operates in Co-op City via sections 1-2-3, then runs to Bay Plaza Shopping Center.; Some weekday and Sunday service extended to Fordham.
Bx39*	Clasons Point; Soundview Avenue and Cornell Avenue	↔	Wakefield; East 241st Street and White Plains Road at Wakefield–241st Street ( train)	White Plains Road	Some Clason Point trips originate at White Plains Road and Westchester Avenue during the evening rush hour.
Bx39*	Williamsbridge; White Plains Road and Gun Hill Road at Gun Hill Road station ( trains)	↔	Wakefield; East 241st Street and White Plains Road at Wakefield–241st Street ( train)	White Plains Road	Overnight service.
Bx40* Bx42	Morris Heights; River Park Towers	↔	SUNY Maritime College	All trips: Burnside Avenue, East 180th Street, East Tremont Avenue; Bx40 trips: Harding Avenue, Pennyfield Avenue; Bx42 trips: Balcom Avenue, Harding Avenue	
Bx40* Bx42	Morris Heights; River Park Towers	↔	Throgs Neck; Harding Avenue and Emerson Avenue	All trips: Burnside Avenue, East 180th Street, East Tremont Avenue; Bx40 trips: Harding Avenue, Pennyfield Avenue; Bx42 trips: Balcom Avenue, Harding Avenue	Some early AM service begins/terminates at Westchester Square.
Bx41*	Local Service				
Bx41*	Select Bus Service (All Day)				
Bx41*	The Hub; East 148th Street and Third Avenue at Third Avenue–149th Street ( trains)	↔	Williamsbridge; White Plains Road and East Gun Hill Road at Gun Hill Road ( trains)	Melrose Avenue, Webster Avenue	No overnight Select Bus Service, service is provided by local buses only.; Select trips originate/terminate at Fordham Road and Webster Avenue.
Bx46	Longwood; Prospect Avenue and Westchester Avenue at Prospect Avenue ( trains)	↔	Hunts Point Cooperative Market	Longwood Avenue, Tiffany Street, Viele Avenue	
Co-op City section note: 1-2-3-4-5 corresponds to Dreiser, Carver, Bellamy, Asch, and Einstein Loops, respectively; buses pull into Asch and Dreiser Loops directly.

==== Subway shuttle routes ====
The following table lists the scheduled NYC Bus routes that temporarily replace portions of service on the New York City Subway due to system maintenance.

Route	NYCS Service	Terminals			Primary streets traveled
Bx92	train	Third Avenue-149th Street ( trains)	↔	135th Street, Manhattan ( trains)	East 149th Street, Malcom X Boulevard
Bx95	train	Woodlawn ( train)	↔	Kingsbridge Road ( train)	Jerome Avenue
T102	train	Hunts Point Avenue ( train)	↔	Harlem-125th Street, Manhattan ( trains)	Southern Boulevard, East 138th Street
T103	train	Pelham Bay Park ( train)	↔	Parkchester-East 177th Street ( train)	Westchester Avenue
T113	train	East 180th Street ( trains)	↔	Eastchester—Dyre Avenue ( train)	Morris Park Avenue, Williamsbridge Road
T117	train	East 180th Street ( trains)	↔	Wakefield-241st Street ( train)	White Plains Road
T127	train	Norwood-205th Street ( train)	↔	Mosholu Parkway ( train)	Bainbridge Avenue, Mosholu Parkway

=== Hudson Rail Link ===
See Hudson Rail Link

== History of current routes ==
Route	History
Bx1	Began on July 3, 1921.; In April 1928, the original terminus was at Moshulu Parkway.; Original north-western terminus was at Broadway-231st Street ( train). Service was extended to Riverdale-West 246th Street in February 1984, and was later cut back to its current terminus in 1990 after the Bx7 started running all times except nights.; Some Bx1 trips also ran via Paul Avenue and Bedford Park Boulevard in both directions until March 1993.; First route in the city to implement articulated buses on September 30, 1996.; Effective October 30, 1997, southbound buses no longer stopped at Paul Avenue, and used the main road of Mosholu Parkway instead of the service road between Paul Avenue and Sedgewick Avenue.; Original south-western terminus was at 138th Street–Grand Concourse ( train). Southbound service was extended to its current terminus on September 8, 2002.; In March 2002, the MTA announced a plan to revise service on the Bx1, Bx2, and Bx41 routes in Mott Haven by extending the Bx1 and Bx2 to a new terminal at Lincoln Avenue and East 138th Street and truncating the Bx41 to East 149th Street and Third Avenue. The Bx41 would have a terminal loop consisting of Third Avenue, East 146th Street, Willis Avenue, East 147th Street, and Third Avenue. At the time, the Bx1 had terminated at the 138th Street–Grand Concourse subway station, while the Bx2 had terminated at East 147th Street and Third Avenue near the Third Avenue–149th Street subway station. The changes were intended to improve service reliability on the Bx1 and Bx2 by consolidating route supervision at their new terminal. There was no dispatcher at Grand Concourse and East 138th Street, and without full supervision, trips were often out of order when they merged at Grand Concourse and East 165th Street. The truncation of the Bx41 made the changes cost-neutral and ensured there would not be too many buses in the vicinity of East 138th Street and Lincoln Avenue. About 1,000 Bx41 daily riders would need to transfer with the changes. The changes took effect on September 8, 2002.; Prior to September 12, 2010, Bx1 and Bx2 local and Limited-Stop services ran together weekdays and Saturdays.; Limited-Stop service was introduced on February 23, 1993, as a weekday rush hour-only service. Initially, it would have been implemented in January.; Service was eventually extended to run weekdays and Saturdays in September 1996.; All weekday and Saturday Limited-Stop service became the Bx1 on September 12, 2010.
Bx2	Began July 3, 1921.; Southbound service originally ran via Third Avenue between East 161st Street and The Hub-East 150th Street until July 1974.; Some Bx2 trips also ran via Paul Avenue and Bedford Park Boulevard in both directions until July 1974, when the Bx1 took over this role.; Effective October 30, 1997, southbound buses no longer stopped at Paul Avenue, and used the main road of Mosholu Parkway instead of the service road between Paul Avenue and Sedgewick Avenue.; In March 2002, the MTA announced a plan to revise service on the Bx1, Bx2, and Bx41 routes in Mott Haven by extending the Bx1 and Bx2 to a new terminal at Lincoln Avenue and East 138th Street and truncating the Bx41 to East 149th Street and Third Avenue. The Bx41 would have a terminal loop consisting of Third Avenue, East 146th Street, Willis Avenue, East 147th Street, and Third Avenue. At the time, the Bx1 had terminated at the 138th Street–Grand Concourse subway station, while the Bx2 had terminated at East 147th Street and Third Avenue near the Third Avenue–149th Street subway station. The changes were intended to improve service reliability on the Bx1 and Bx2 by consolidating route supervision at their new terminal. There was no dispatcher at Grand Concourse and East 138th Street, and without full supervision, trips were often out of order when they merged at Grand Concourse and East 165th Street. The truncation of the Bx41 made the changes cost-neutral and ensured there would not be too many buses in the vicinity of East 138th Street and Lincoln Avenue. About 1,000 Bx41 daily riders would need to transfer with the changes. The changes took effect on September 8, 2002.; On August 16, 2008, Bx2, Bx15, Bx41, and Bx55 service were rerouted in The Hub due to the reconstruction of streets by the New York City Department of Transportation to improve pedestrian safety. Bx2 service was rerouted off of East 165th Street and Melrose Avenue. Northbound service started running east via East 146th Street, north on Willis Avenue, north on Bergen Avenue, west on East 149th Street, and north on Grand Concourse, while southbound service continued along Grand Concourse to East 149th Street, turned east on that street, south on Courtlandt Avenue, and south on Third Avenue. Southbound Bx15 service would stay on Third Avenue until East 146th Street, and run along that street and Willis Avenue before returning to its previous route. Northbound Bx41 service would run north on Third Avenue, west on East 152nd Street, and north on Melrose Avenue before resuming its previous route, while southbound service would run south on Melrose Avenue, east on East 154th Street, south on Elton Avenue, and then south on Third Avenue before resuming its previous route. Finally, the terminal loop of the Bx55 was modified to run south on Third Avenue, east on East 146th Street, north on Willis Avenue, and then north on Third Avenue.; Originally had Limited-Stop service until September 12, 2010, when all weekday and Saturday local service became the Bx2.
Bx3	Replaced University Avenue Line streetcars on October 25, 1947; formerly Bx38.; Extended to the George Washington Bus Station from 181st Street and Broadway on September 13, 1987.; Late night service originally ran between Washington Heights and Sedgwick Av-Kingsbridge Road until September 10, 1995, due to a budget crisis.; On January 18, 1998, buses started terminating at Wadsworth Avenue.
Bx4/4A	Replaced Westchester Avenue Line streetcars on July 10, 1948; formerly Bx42.; 'A' variant was created on January 2, 2011, to replace former Bx14 service at Parkchester via Metropolitan Oval.; In June 2022, Bx4A service west of Southern Boulevard eliminated in exchange for increased frequency on Bx4 and Bx4A.
Bx5	Began March 26, 1928 by New York City Department of Plant and Structures.; In April 1928, the original eastern terminus was at City Island via Pelham Parkway, Pelham Bridge Road and City Island Avenue. The western terminus was at West Farms Square-East Tremont Avenue via Eastchester Road and Tremont Avenue.; Original north-eastern terminus was at Pelham Bay Park ( trains). Part-time service was extended to Pelham Parkway-Seymour Avenue in November 1967, then to Pelham Parkway-Laconia Avenue (at Pelham Parkway ( train)) in July 1974, and was later cut back to its original terminus in 1988.; Original south-western terminus was at Longwood Avenue-Prospect Avenue (at Prospect Avenue ( trains)). Service was rerouted to its current terminus in November 1967.; Service originally ran throughout Bruckner Boulevard, until Story Avenue service between Bronx River Avenue and White Plains Road was instituted in November 1967. Lafayette Avenue service between White Plains Road and Castle Hill Avenue was also instituted in April 1999.; Service originally had a split branched service (known as the Bx5A) to either Parkchester ( trains) or Metropolitan Oval-Purdy Street.; On June 21, 1965, Bx5A service was extended from Hugh Grant Circle to Purdy Street and Parker Street via Metropolitan Avenue.; Bx5A trips were split into a separate, former Bx54 service in July 1974.; Seasonal summer service to Orchard Beach was first introduced in February 1984, running all times except nights. Seasonal summer service was later reduced to a weekend-only service in September 1990, and was later discontinued on September 10, 1995 due to a budget crisis, and then in Summer 2016. The last run of the summer trips was in Labor Day 2015.; Bx5 service to Pelham Bay Park (and formerly Laconia Avenue) initially ran during the daytime hours only except late afternoon, evenings and late nights. Short-turn service to White Plains Road was instituted after the Bx54's elimination in September 1990 and service to Pelham Bay Park was expanded to also run late afternoon and evenings.; Service was initially rerouted from Bruckner Boulevard to Crosby Avenue in Pelham Bay to replace Bx8 service through the area on June 27, 2010, due to another budget crisis. Service was rerouted back to Bruckner Boulevard in April 2012 due to congestion issues at Crosby Avenue.; Weekend trips were extended from Pelham Bay Park to Co-op City's Bay Plaza Shopping Center in September 2015.
Bx6	Replaced 163rd Street Crosstown Line streetcars on June 27, 1948; formerly Bx34.; In Fiscal Year 1963, this route was extended to directly serve industrial areas.; On February 14, 1965, the route was extended on mile from 155th Street and St. Nicholas Avenue to Riverside Drive and 157th Street via 155 Street, Broadway, and 157th Street.; Original southern terminus was at Halleck Street-East Bay Avenue. Service was partially extended to East Bay Avenue-Hunts Point Avenue in November 1967, and then to its current terminus in July 1974.; Former Bx34A rush hour-only shuttle service, running only within the eastern and western areas of Hunts Point, became part of the Bx6 in February 1984. The western branch of Hunts Point was eliminated in 1990, and was not replaced by another service until the Barreto Pool Shuttle (current Bx46) started serving the area in July 2008.; Select Bus Service began on September 3, 2017.; Articulated buses debuted on July 1, 2018 for Bx6 SBS, and on December 3, 2018 for Bx6.
Bx7	Began February 12, 1928; formerly the Bx10. In April the same year, the original routing ran between Riverdale-West 262nd Street and Broadway-West 234th Street via Spuyten Duyvil; Originally three separate services; the Bx10 (current Bx7), Bx10A (until February 1965) and Bx10B (until July 1974).; Original Bx10A service ran via Spuyten Duyvil, terminating at Henry Hudson Parkway-West 239th Street until February 1965.; Original Bx10B service ran via Riverdale Avenue, terminating at Waldo Avenue-Manhattan College Parkway until November 1967. Service was later extended to run towards Fieldston Road-West 256th Street and became part of the former Bx10 service in July 1974. This split branched service only ran weekday rush hours until its elimination in February 1984.; Renumbered to Bx7 circa 1984.; Original south-western terminus was at Inwood-West 207th Street ( train). Service was extended to its current terminus in 1990, and southbound late night service to Inwood-West 207th Street was introduced in March 1993.; Service originally ran weekdays only until 1990, when service was expanded to run all times except nights, replacing Bx1 service at Riverdale Avenue.
Bx8	Began November 1, 1927 (northern portion) and June 15, 1934, by Bronx Coach (southern portion).; Original northern terminus was at Burke Avenue ( trains). Service was extended to its current terminus via Bronxwood Avenue in July 1974.; Original south-eastern terminus was at Westchester Square–East Tremont Avenue ( trains). Service merged with former Bx23 service (Westchester Avenue-Buhre Avenue to Throgs Neck-Schley Avenue) and former Bx40 split branched services (at Edgewater Park and Locust Point) in September 1989.; In March 1995, the Bx8 began using East 222nd Street heading southbound instead of East 225th Street to avoid a narrow street. This recommendation was made as part of the North East Bronx Comprehensive Community Planning Study.; The MTA, in September 2001, announced a plan to reroute southbound Bx8 bus service off of Otis Avenue and Logan Avenue, which are narrow two-way streets, and onto the Bruckner Boulevard South Service Road and Hollywood Avenue in Schuylerville. The change would take effect in Fall 2001.; In November 2002, the MTA announced a reroute of the Bx8 to run along Pennyfield Avenue and Harding Avenue instead of along the Throgs Neck Neck Expressway Service Road. This change was intended to restore a direct transfer to the Bx40 that had been lost when that route was rerouted from Lawton Avenue onto Harding Avenue between East Tremont Avenue and Pennyfield Avenue in June 2002, which required a two block walk. The change took effect immediately upon its approval.; Service was initially rerouted from Crosby Avenue to Stadium Avenue via Country Club on June 27, 2010 due to a budget crisis, partially replacing former Bx14 service. Bx8 service was reverted to its original routing on January 2, 2011 due to opposition from Country Club and Locust Point residents.
Bx9	Replaced Bronx and Van Cortlandt Parks Crosstown Line streetcars on January 24, 1948; formerly Bx20.; Late night service originally ran between Riverdale and Fordham Plaza until September 1990, when late night service started running the entire route.; In December 1999, a proposed change to the southern terminal of the route at West Farms Square was announced. The route had a non-revenue turnaround running south on West Farms Road, west on the Cross Bronx Expressway Service Road, and north on Bryant Avenue to Boston Road. To eliminate a lengthy turnaround with several turns, and to improve dispatcher supervision, the layover of the route would be moved to East Tremont Avenue from Boston Road and Bryant Avenue. The turnaround route would be modified to run south from the terminal at Boston Road along Boston Road, east on East Tremont Avenue to a new layover area and new last stop, and then north on Devoe Avenue, and west on East 180th Street. The change would take effect the same month.
Bx10	New route introduced in January 1984.; Service was created from the northern section of the Bx7 via Riverdale Avenue, the south-western section of former Bx24 service via Spuyten Duyvil, and the Bx1 route between West 231st Street and Paul Avenue. Also formerly part of the old Bx28 weekday rush hour-only service between Bedford Park-Paul Avenue and East Gun Hill Road-Bainbridge Avenue.; Service originally ran with the Bx1 at Sedgwick Avenue and Heath Avenue until June 1996, when it was rerouted to serve Bailey Avenue.
Bx11	Began on February 27, 1948.; Extended to the George Washington Bus Station from 181st Street and Broadway on September 13, 1987.; In 1991, New York City Transit proposed eliminating overnight service between 1 a.m. and 5 a.m.. This was proposed once again, and was approved in 1994 to take into effect in 1995. The change affected nine daily passengers.; On January 18, 1998, buses started turning south on Wadsworth Avenue instead of Broadway.; Original southern terminus was at Freeman Street ( trains). Service was extended to West Farms Road and Southern Boulevard in June 1998.; In June 2022, overnight service was restored. Service was rerouted east along Boston Road and 174th Street to end at Parkchester, and service rerouted via Edward L. Grant Highway west of 170th Street.
Bx12	In April 1928, the original western terminus was at Fordham Road-Jerome Avenue.; Replaced 207th Street Crosstown Line streetcars on January 24, 1948, and former Bx19 207th Street Crosstown Line became part of the Bx12 in July 1974; Original western terminus was at Sedgwick Avenue. Former Bx19 service between Inwood-West 207th Street ( train) and Southern Boulevard-Fordham Road became part of the Bx12 in July 1974.; Service was temporarily rerouted via Bailey Avenue, West 225th Street and the Broadway Bridge when access to the University Heights Bridge was suspended between 1988 and June 1996.; Original eastern terminus was at City Island. Service remained after the Bx29 was introduced in 1990 as its eventual replacement, and all Bx12 service to City Island was discontinued in September 1990.; A temporary split branched service to Co-op City-Bartow Avenue was introduced in 1990, running all times except nights. Full-time service was later shifted over to Co-op City in September 1990, and service was later extended to serve inside Bay Plaza in September 1998.; Service also had a branch to the Bartow-Pell Mansion at Shore Road, but was discontinued in 1990 due to low ridership.; Former Limited-Stop service was introduced in 1989 as a weekday rush hour-only service. Service was slightly increased during the weekday rush hours in January 1995 with an additional stop added at Jacobi Hospital, and the span of Bx12 Limited service was extended to operate all day between 6:30 a.m. and 7 p.m. on September 8, 1997.
Bx13	Replaced Ogden Avenue Line streetcars on October 25, 1947; formerly the Bx37 and Bx49.; Original branched north-western terminus of the former Bx49 was at Union Place-Woodycrest Avenue. Service was extended to the Morrisania neighborhood at Walton Avenue-East 167th Street in July 1974.; Former Bx49 service was rerouted away from Morrisania, and started serving Washington Heights with former Bx37 service via one-way directions at Woodycrest Avenue and Anderson Avenue in 1977.; Former Bx49 split branched service became part of the Bx13 in February 1984. This rush hour-only service ran between El Grant Highway-West 174th Street and Third Avenue-East 163rd Street via one-way directions at Woodycrest Avenue and Anderson Avenue until 1988, when all rush hour-only service was shifted over to Ogden Avenue. All rush hour-only service was eventually discontinued in 1990.; Overnight service discontinued on September 10, 1995 due to a budget crisis.; Original western terminus was at 181st Street ( train). Service was extended to the George Washington Bridge Bus Terminal on January 18, 1998.; In July 2004, service was later extended back to Third Avenue-East 163rd Street as a weekday morning-only service.; Full-time service from Yankee Stadium was extended southward to the Bronx Terminal Market on January 6, 2013.
Bx15	Replaced Harlem Shuttle and Willis Avenue Line streetcars on August 5, 1941; formerly Bx29.; Southbound service originally ran via Washington Avenue between July 1974 and February 1984.; On September 8, 1996, late night Bx15 service (between 1 a.m. and 4:30 a.m.) was merged with the Bx55's late night service was discontinued. The frequency of Bx15 service along the entire route was reduced from running every 50 minutes to running every 60 minutes. Supplemental Bx15 service was provided between Fordham Road and 149th Street to maintain the Bx55's frequency. To maintain the transfer to the subway, bus-subway transfers were accepted on the Bx15 overnight. The change was made to eliminate duplicative service, which was lightly patronized. In addition, an unnecessary turn at 147th Street was eliminated. This awkward turn was initially done because a support pillar of the Third Avenue Elevated had prevented northbound buses from turning directly from Willis Avenue to Third Avenue. This pillar had been gone for some time.; Articulated buses debuted on June 27, 2010 for the Bx15 to address weekend Bx55 customers due to a budget crisis.; Bx15 Limited service replaced former Bx55 Limited-Stop service between Fordham Plaza and The Hub on July 1, 2013, no longer stopping at East 174th Street.; To improve reliability, as part of the Bronx Bus Redesign, service south of 149th Street was split with the new M125 route on June 26, 2022.
Bx16	Original north-eastern terminus was at Mundy Lane-Pitman Avenue (at NYC-Mount Vernon line).; Originally ran via Webster Avenue between East 233rd Street and East Gun Hill Road. Mundy Lane-bound buses also originally ran via East 204th Street and Webster Avenue until July 1974.; Portions of former Bx14 and Bx19 services were merged to create a new split branched service to Pelham Manor in February 1984.; Originally served either Mundy Lane and Pelham Manor all times except nights until March 1993, when weekday only service started alternating to either terminals until 7 pm.; Mundy Lane service merged with Pelham Manor split branched service in 1993, running weekday evenings and weekends only.; This service change also applied for all weekday service on September 2, 2007.
Bx17	Began on October 24, 1921 by the New York City Department of Plant and Structures. Originally had a split branched service to The Hub-Bergen Avenue/East 147th Street via East 156th Street in April 1928.; Replaced St. Ann's Avenue Line streetcars on July 10, 1948; formerly Bx3.; Originally ran via East 187th Street and Third Avenue in both directions. Service was rerouted to run at Fordham Road in July 1974.; Original south-eastern terminus was at Jackson Avenue-East 141st Street. Service was rerouted to replace former Bx30 and Bx31 services in February 1984, and Jackson Avenue service was discontinued.; Overnight service discontinued on September 10, 1995 due to a budget crisis.; Service was rerouted again via St. Ann's Avenue on September 11, 2005, partially replacing former Bx32 service, and Port Morris service was discontinued.
Bx18 (Bx18A/B)	Began service on June 22, 1941.; Original eastern terminus was at Claremont Parkway-Webster Avenue. Service was cut back to its current terminus in July 1974.; Original western terminus was at Andrews Avenue-West 175th Street. Extended west via former Bx39 service (which was discontinued in 1953) to the River Park Towers in July 1974.; On June 26, 2022, the route was extended south from River Park Towers to 168th Street and east on 168th Street, Shakespeare Avenue, and 170th Street to the Grand Concourse, making it a loop route.; On January 8, 2023, the Bx18 was split into the Bx18A and Bx18B to label each loop.; From September 24, 2023 until August 31, 2024, a pilot fare-free program was in effect for both loops.
Bx19	Replaced 149th Street Crosstown Line streetcars on August 16, 1947; formerly Bx30.; Replaced Southern Boulevard Line streetcars on August 21, 1948; formerly Bx31.; Original northern terminus was at Fordham Road. Service was extended to its current terminus in July 1974.; Portions of former Bx30 and Bx31 services were merged to create the Bx19 in February 1984. Eastern section at Bruckner Expressway-East 149th Street and Port Morris section was replaced by rerouted Bx17 service.
Bx20	New route introduced on March 5, 1989, as the Bronx portion of the M100, which originally served Spuyten Duyvil (all times except nights) and Riverdale (late evenings and weekends only). Bx20 service was not extended further to serve Riverdale-West 262nd Street.; Sunday service was discontinued on September 10, 1995 due to a budget crisis.; On January 13, 1997, service was extended one block from Isham Street to the subway entrance at the Inwood–207th Street subway station at Broadway.; Off-peak and Saturday service were discontinued on June 28, 2010 due to another budget crisis.
Bx21	Replaced Boston Road Line streetcars on August 21, 1948; formerly Bx26.; Original north-eastern terminus was the Bronx Municipal Hospital Center at Morris Park Avenue. Service was extended to its current terminus in February 1984.; Originally ran with the Bx31 via Eastchester Road. Service was later rerouted to serve the New York City Children's Center Bronx Campus at Waters Place in September 1990.; Former bus stop inside the New York City Children's Center Bronx Campus was discontinued on January 6, 2013.
Bx22	Began in 1928; formerly the Bx13.; Original northern terminus was at Pelham Parkway ( trains). Service was extended to serve Fordham Road-Valentine Avenue (all times except nights) and Bedford Park (weekdays only) on February 19, 1984.; Select Bx22 services (originating only from Bedford Park weekdays and Pelham Parkway daily) also had a split branched service to Clasons Point via Lacombe Avenue and White Plains Road in 1984, running all times except evenings and late nights. This branch was originally instituted to serve passengers riding to the former Shorehaven Beach Club. Because the club closed in 1986, ridership for this branch was scant and was eliminated in March 1988. Current Bx22 service at Castle Hill Avenue, along with the Bx27 at Soundview Avenue/White Plains Road and Bx36 at Randall Avenue, accommodated the small number of affected passengers.
Bx23	Operated under MTA Bus; formerly operated by Queens Surface Corporation as the Co-op City portion of the QBx1 (now the Q50).; Service was split from the QBx1 in September 2010, and 10 service variants were consolidated into four.; Rush hour service pattern between Pelham Bay Park and Sections 1-2-3-4 or between Pelham Bay and Sections 5 via Bartow Avenue were discontinued on June 29, 2014, when current uniform service patterns were instituted.
Bx24	Introduced on January 2, 2011, to replace portion of former Bx14 service between Country Club and Westchester Square.; Service was extended from Pelham Bay Park ( trains) to Westchester Square ( trains) on April 8, 2012, then to Hutchinson Metro Center in August 2014.; Service between Hutchinson Metro Center and Pelham Bay Park ( trains) began to run overnight on June 1, 2016.; On June 26, 2022, a short, meandering segment along Ohm Avenue, Griswold Drive, and Spencer Drive was eliminated. The Bx24 was rerouted on the more direct route on Kennelworth Place.
Bx25	Route created in June 2022 as part of a redesign of the Bronx bus system; follows the pre-June 2010 route of the Bx26 but terminates at Bay Plaza.
Bx26	Began in 1928; formerly the Bx17.; Original north-eastern terminus was at Westervelt Avenue. Service was extended to its current terminus in July 1974.; Original western terminus was at Allerton Avenue-White Plains Road ( trains). Service was extended to its current terminus in July 1974, in addition to having a former split branched service to Fordham Center.; Split branched service to Bedford Park originally ran all times except nights until December 1991, when it started running weekday rush hours, early weekend mornings and late evenings only.; In March 2000, the MTA announced plans to simplify Bx26 and Bx28 service, which had complicated service patterns. The Bx26 duplicated the Bx28 along Kingsbridge Road and Jerome Avenue during certain times of day, and he two routes had complicated service patterns that changed significantly by day of week and time of day, with multiple western terminals. At the time, Bx26 service operated between Earhart Lane and Erskine Place in Co-op City to 192nd Street and Valentine Avenue in Fordham via Allerton Avenue and Bedford Park Boulevard on weekdays between 7 and 10 p.m., Saturdays between 9 a.m. and 10:30 p.m., and Sundays between 10 a.m. and 9:30 p.m.. During three times on weekdays (6:30 a.m. to 9:00 a.m., 4:30 p.m. to 6:00 p.m., and 10:00 p.m. to 11:30 p.m.), and early mornings and late evenings on Saturdays (7 a.m. to 9 a.m., and 10:30 p.m. to 11:30 p.m.), and Sundays (7 a.m. to 10 a.m. and 9:30 p.m. to 11:30 p.m.), service was also provided to Paul Avenue and Bedford Park Boulevard. Selected westbound Bx26 trips in the AM peak period ran directly from the southern portion of Co-op City to Allerton Avenue, bypassing Co-op City Sections 2, 3, and 4 via Asch Loop. The Bx28 operated between Earhart Lane and Erskine Place in Co-op City to Valentine Avenue and East 192nd Street in Fordham via Gun Hill Road, Bainbridge Avenue, and Jerome Avenue on weekdays between 7 a.m. and 10 p.m. and on Saturdays between 10 a.m. and 10 p.m.. Short-turns service operated to Mosholu Parkway and Jerome Avenue between 6 a.m. and 11:30 p.m. on weekdays, 6:30 a.m. to 11:30 p.m. on Saturdays, and on Sundays between 7:30 a.m. and 11:30 p.m., and late night service operated to 206th Street and Bainbridge Avenue. Additional Bx28 service operated to Valentine Avenue and East 192nd Street on weekdays between 7 a.m. and 10 p.m., and on Saturdays between 10 a.m. and 10 p.m.; The service changes would provide service to each western terminal on weekdays, Saturdays, and Sundays during consistent time periods. Bx26 service would terminate at Paul Avenue and Bedford Park Boulevard between 6 a.m. to 11:30 p.m. daily, and service would no longer run to 192nd Street and Valentine Avenue. The number of western terminals for the Bx28 would be reduced from three to two, with service terminating at 192nd Street and Valentine Avenue between 5 a.m. and 12 a.m. weekdays, and 6 a.m. to 11 p.m. on weekends. When service operated more frequently than every ten minutes, every other bus would terminate at 206th Street and Bainbridge Avenue. Buses would no longer short-turn at Mosholu Parkway and Jerome Avenue. Late night service would continue to terminate at 206th Street and Bainbridge Avenue. In addition, Bx26 Asch Loop bypass service that ran directly to the southern portion of Co-op City would be expanded in the morning to run between 6:20 a.m. and 8:20 a.m., and would be added in the afternoon rush hour between 5 p.m. and 7 p.m.. This service would be renumbered to the Bx25 to reduce rider confusion. The changes would save $150,000 annually. The changes took effect on September 10, 2000.; Service originally ran all of Co-op City from July 1974 until June 27, 2010; rerouted through Asch Loop to replace the former Bx25 due to a budget crisis.
Bx27	Replaced Sound View Avenue Line streetcars on March 8, 1947.; Original south-western terminus was at Westchester Avenue-Fox Street (near Simpson Street ( trains)). Service was cut back to its current terminus in July 1974.; On August 15, 2018, the Bx27 was partially extended to serve the Soundview Ferry Terminal all times except nights. This extended service runs every 15–30 minutes.
Bx28	Began September 18, 1933; formerly the Bx15.; Original north-eastern terminus was at Gunther Avenue-Bartow Avenue. Service was extended to its current terminus in July 1974.; Original western terminus was at Moshulu Parkway ( train). Service was extended to its current terminus in July 1974, and the original terminus at Moshulu Parkway was retained, with all buses ending there on Sundays until September 10, 2000.; Former Bx15A service was part of the Bx15, running between Eastchester Road-Boston Road and Norwood-205th Street ( train). Service was split into a separate Bx6 service (current Bx30) in July 1974.; In March 2000, the MTA announced plans to simplify Bx26 and Bx28 service, which had complicated service patterns. The Bx26 duplicated the Bx28 along Kingsbridge Road and Jerome Avenue during certain times of day, and the two routes had complicated service patterns that changed significantly by day of week and time of day, with multiple western terminals. At the time, Bx26 service operated between Earhart Lane and Erskine Place in Co-op City to 192nd Street and Valentine Avenue in Fordham via Allerton Avenue and Bedford Park Boulevard on weekdays between 7 and 10 p.m., Saturdays between 9 a.m. and 10:30 p.m., and Sundays between 10 a.m. and 9:30 p.m.. During three times on weekdays (6:30 a.m. to 9:00 a.m., 4:30 p.m. to 6:00 p.m., and 10:00 p.m. to 11:30 p.m.), and early mornings and late evenings on Saturdays (7 a.m. to 9 a.m., and 10:30 p.m. to 11:30 p.m.), and Sundays (7 a.m. to 10 a.m. and 9:30 p.m. to 11:30 p.m.), service was also provided to Paul Avenue and Bedford Park Boulevard. Selected westbound Bx26 trips in the AM peak period ran directly from the southern portion of Co-op City to Allerton Avenue, bypassing Co-op City Sections 2, 3, and 4 via Asch Loop. The Bx28 operated between Earhart Lane and Erskine Place in Co-op City to Valentine Avenue and East 192nd Street in Fordham via Gun Hill Road, Bainbridge Avenue, and Jerome Avenue on weekdays between 7 a.m. and 10 p.m. and on Saturdays between 10 a.m. and 10 p.m.. Short-turns service operated to Mosholu Parkway and Jerome Avenue between 6 a.m. and 11:30 p.m. on weekdays, 6:30 a.m. to 11:30 p.m. on Saturdays, and on Sundays between 7:30 a.m. and 11:30 p.m., and late night service operated to 206th Street and Bainbridge Avenue. Additional Bx28 service operated to Valentine Avenue and East 192nd Street on weekdays between 7 a.m. and 10 p.m., and on Saturdays between 10 a.m. and 10 p.m.; The service changes would provide service to each western terminal on weekdays, Saturdays, and Sundays during consistent time periods. Bx26 service would terminate at Paul Avenue and Bedford Park Boulevard between 6 a.m. to 11:30 p.m. daily, and service would no longer run to 192nd Street and Valentine Avenue. The number of western terminals for the Bx28 would be reduced from three to two, with service terminating at 192nd Street and Valentine Avenue between 5 a.m. and 12 a.m. weekdays, and 6 a.m. to 11 p.m. on weekends. When service operated more frequently than every ten minutes, every other bus would terminate at 206th Street and Bainbridge Avenue. Buses would no longer short-turn at Mosholu Parkway and Jerome Avenue. Late night service would continue to terminate at 206th Street and Bainbridge Avenue. In addition, Bx26 Asch Loop bypass service that ran directly to the southern portion of Co-op City would be expanded in the morning to run between 6:20 a.m. and 8:20 a.m., and would be added in the afternoon rush hour between 5 p.m. and 7 p.m.. This service would be renumbered to the Bx25 to reduce rider confusion. The changes would save $150,000 annually. The changes took effect on September 10, 2000.; Service originally ran all of Co-op City from July 1974 until June 27, 2010; section 1-2-3 service was split off into the Bx38 due to a budget crisis.; Service via Asch Loop was added on June 29, 2014.
Bx29	New route introduced in 1990 as the eventual replacement of the Bx12 branch to City Island, running all times except nights. Late night service in the neighborhood was discontinued after the Bx12 was shifted over to Co-op City in September 1990.; Original northern terminus was at Co-op City-Bartow Avenue. Service was extended to serve Bay Plaza Shopping Center on November 5, 1995.; In January 2001, it was announced that the Bx29's route would be revised to turn north onto Co-Op City Boulevard instead of Baychester Avenue to better serve the center of the Bay Plaza Shopping Center. The change would be implemented in early 2001.; On June 26, 2022, service north of Pelham Bay Park was discontinued. Late night service in City Island was restored.
Bx30	Originally known as the Bx15A, and formerly part of old Bx15 service, it was split into a separate Bx6 route in July 1974.; Service was later re-branded as a new route in February 1984, merging former Bx6 service (between Norwood-205th Street ( train) and Boston Road-Corsa Avenue) and former Bx7 service (Boston Road segment between East Gun Hill Road and Conner Street only). Service was further extended to serve Co-op City with the Bx26 and Bx28.; Original Co-op City terminus was at Bellamy Loop. Service was rerouted southward to Earhart Lane in 1988.; Original Co-op City-bound service ran via East 204th Street and Webster Avenue until March 1993.; Service via Asch Loop was eliminated on June 27, 2010 due to a budget crisis, but was later restored in January 2012.; On June 26, 2022, service was rerouted on Boston Road south of Gun Hill Road and the route was modified to end at Pelham Parkway station.
Bx31	Began November 1, 1927; formerly Bx9.; Original northern terminus was at East 225th Street ( trains), running within East 224th-227th Streets in Williamsbridge. Former Bx14A service between East 233rd Street ( trains) and Laconia Avenue-East 225th Street via Edenwald Playground became part of the Bx9 in July 1974, but service at Edenwald Houses was discontinued.; Service was later extended to Webster Avenue-East 238th Street (near Woodlawn Metro-North station) in 1988 and then rerouted to run with the Bx34 at Woodlawn-Katonah Avenue in April 2007.
Bx32	Replaced Morris Avenue Line streetcars on January 1, 1941; formerly Bx25.; Original part-time northern terminus was at Reservoir Avenue-West 195th Street (near Kingsbridge Road ( train)) All service to and from this terminal ended between 6 pm and 7 pm, with all remaining buses terminating at Jerome Avenue-East 175th Street (near 176th Street ( train)) during the evening hours.; On February 19, 1984, service to Kingsbridge was expanded to run until 10 pm daily, with the last few remaining buses terminating at Jerome Avenue-East 175th Street.; Before a study was conducted in February 1986, the VA Hospital requested either the Bx3 or Bx9 be diverted to serve hospital grounds. In September 1986, the Bx32 was chosen to be extended from the former terminal, which went into effect in January 1987. To accommodate this extension, the original short turn service to Jerome Avenue-East 175th Street was discontinued and service to and from the hospital ran between 6 am and 11:30 pm daily. Further recommendation also included the bus to bypass the West 195th Street area during non-school hours, running at Kingsbridge Road instead.
Bx33	Replaced 138th Street Crosstown Line streetcars on July 10, 1948.; Minor Route Change effective Sunday, September 6, 2026. Buses start/end at Walnut Avenue/132 Street and run eastbound to Locust Avenue. Buses run north on Locust Avenue until 138 Street, before turning left on 135 Street.
Bx34	Began April 2, 1928 by New York City Department of Plant and Structures; formerly Bx4. The original western terminus was at Fordham Road-Jerome Avenue in April 1928. Northbound service towards 196th Street ran at Valentine Avenue.; Weekend service was originally discontinued on June 27, 2010 due to a budget crisis, but was later restored on January 6, 2013.
Bx35	Replaced 167th Street Crosstown Line streetcars on July 10, 1948; Original eastern terminus was at Westchester Avenue-East 167th Street (near Whitlock Avenue ( trains)). Service was rerouted to West Farms Road and Southern Boulevard in September 1990.; Articulated buses debuted on September 1, 2019.; On June 26, 2022, service was extended via West Farms Road, Jennings Street, and Bryant Avenue.
Bx36	Replaced 180th Street Crosstown Line streetcars on October 25, 1947.; Original south-eastern terminus was at Bruckner Boulevard-Zerega Avenue via Cross Bronx Expressway, running all times except nights until February 1984.; On February 14, 1965, every other bus on the route was extended one mile to run to Pugsley Avenue and Story Avenue, instead of to the previous terminal of Chatterton Avenue and Zerega Avenue. These buses would turn off the regular route at Westchester Avenue and White Plains Road. These buses would run via White Plains Road, Houghton Avenue, and Pugsley Avenue to the terminal, and via Story Avenue and White Plains Road before turning back onto Westchester Avenue for the trip back to Manhattan.; Full-time south-eastern terminus to White Plains Road-Story Avenue was first instituted in November 1967, and service was later extended to Soundview-Pugsley Avenue in July 1974.; Soundview-bound and Bruckner Boulevard-bound services started running at East 174th Street in both directions via Boston Road. The Q44 later replaced former Bx36 route via Cross Bronx Expressway.; On September 13, 1987, the Bx36 was extended from 181st Street and Broadway to the outside of the George Washington Bridge Bus Station at 179th Street and Broadway.; On January 18, 1998, buses started turning south on Wadsworth Avenue instead of Broadway.; Westbound trips ran via Hugh Grant Circle (at Parkchester ( trains)) until September 2000.; Rush-hour Limited-Stop service began on September 8, 2009. During peak periods, every other Bx36 trip would make limited stops. The new service was expected to save up to eight minutes in each direction; On June 26, 2022, service was rerouted to Tremont Avenue and White Plains Road rather than 180th Street, Boston Road, and 174th Street.
Bx38	Introduced on June 27, 2010 as a variant of the Bx28 due to a budget crisis; serves the northern portions of Co-op City.
Bx39	Replaced Williamsbridge Line streetcars on August 21, 1948; formerly the Bx28.; Original rush-hour southern terminus originating from Gun Hill Road ( trains) was at Burnside Avenue-Valentine Avenue until November 1967. Service was extended to Grand Concourse-Burnside Avenue (near Tremont Avenue ( train)) until February 1984.; Original rush-hour north-western terminus originating from West Farms Square-East Tremont Avenue ( trains) (and eventually Clasons Point) was at Bedford Park-West 205th Street (near Bedford Park Boulevard ( train)).; Weekday rush-hour service to Mosholu Parkway was discontinued on September 11, 1995, due to a budget crisis.; Southern end was rerouted away from West Farms Square ( trains)) and was extended to Clasons Point via White Plains Road in September 1990.; Northern terminus was extended from Gun Hill Road ( trains) to Wakefield–241st Street ( train) on June 27, 2010 to replace Bx41 local and Limited-Stop services due to a budget crisis.; Late night service between Wakefield and East Gun Hill Road was added in July 2010, to rectify an unintended consequence of eliminating service within that corridor.
Bx40/42	In April 1928, original service ran between Throgs Neck-Fort Schuyler and either to Pelham Bay Station via Bruckner Boulevard (current Bx5 routing) and Westchester Square.; Replaced Tremont Avenue Line streetcars on August 21, 1948.; Original south-eastern terminus was at Bruckner Boulevard-Balcom Avenue. Service merged with former Bx6/6A/6B/6C services in July 1974, serving Throgs Neck, Edgewater Park, Fort Schuyler and Locust Point, and Bruckner Boulevard terminus was discontinued.; Original western terminus was at Burnside Avenue-Sedgwick Avenue. Service was extended to the River Park Towers in February 1984, and Throgs Neck-bound buses started running towards Cedar Avenue and West 179th Street in September 1997.; Bx40 originally had four south-eastern destinations until September 1989: Throgs Neck-Fort Schuyler (Bx6); Throgs Neck-Davis Ave (Bx6B); Locust Point-Tierney Place (Bx6A); Randall-Balcom Houses (Bx6C; weekday rush hour-only service to Westchester Square ( trains)); Bx42 designation was applied to trips via Randall-Balcom Houses and Throgs Neck-Harding Avenue in September 1989, but service was partially cut back from Davis Avenue to Balcom Avenue. Service was later extended to run towards Emerson Avenue in November 2006.; Bx8 service merged with former Bx23 service (Westchester Avenue-Buhre Avenue to Throgs Neck-Schley Avenue) and former Bx40 split branched services (Edgewater Park and Locust Point) in September 1989.; In May 2002, the MTA announced plans to reroute the Bx40 to run along Harding Avenue instead of Lawton Avenue between East Tremont Avenue and Pennyfield Avenue. The change would be made to reroute the route of Lawton Avenue, which was narrow and had an uneven surface.; To operate south along East Tremont Avenue for two additional blocks until Harding Avenue, head east on the street, and resume south along Pennyfield Avenue. Buses ran via Lawton Avenue in both directions until June 30, 2002, when it started running via Harding Avenue.; On June 26, 2022, service on both routes was rerouted from Webster Avenue to the 180th Street/Tremont Avenue intersection via 180th Street rather than Tremont Avenue.
Bx41	Replaced Webster and White Plains Avenues Line streetcars on June 27, 1948.; Original south-western terminus was at Mott Haven-Third Avenue/East 141st Street. Service was extended to Lincoln Avenue-East 136th Street (near Third Avenue–138th Street ( trains)) in July 1974 and was later cut back to Third Avenue–149th Street ( trains) in December 2002.; Originally did not have late night service until it was first instituted in November 2005.; Original northern terminus was at Wakefield–241st Street ( train). Service was later cut back to Gun Hill Road ( trains) on June 27, 2010 due to a budget crisis, and was replaced by an extended Bx39 service.; Former rush-hour Limited-Stop service was introduced on September 11, 1995, operating on weekdays between 6:45 and 9 a.m. and between 3:45 and 6:15 p.m, and making limited stops between East 211th Street and East 138th Street.; In December 1999, the MTA announced a proposed change to service between Third Avenue and East 138th Street and East 134th Street and Alexander Avenue to enable the dispatcher at East 138th Street to better supervise service on the route, and to avoid traffic near Bruckner Boulevard. Bx41 would now share a terminal with the Bx21 and Bx32 at Lincoln Avenue and East 138th Street. After stopping at East 138th Street on Third Avenue, southbound service had previously run south on Lincoln Avenue and east along East 134th Street to its terminal. Northbound service continued east on East 134th Street, north on Alexander Avenue, west on East 135th Street, and north along Lincoln and Third Avenues. Only 100 daily riders alighted and only 200 daily riders boarded in the discontinued segment south of East 136th Street. The change was expected to save $50,000 a year. The change would take effect in early 2000.; In July 2000, the MTA announced a proposed revision in the route's terminal loop at East 241st Street and Baychester Avenue. Instead of making a U-turn to head back west on East 241st Street and head south on White Plains Road, northbound buses would turn east White Plains Road at East 238th Street (Nereid Avenue), and then north onto Baychester Avenue before merging onto East 241st Street. The terminal would be moved from the south side of East 241st Street at Baychester Avenue to the north side of East 241st Street at Cranford Avenue. Two northbound bus stops on White Plains Road at East 239th Street and East 240th Street would be discontinued. The change would take effect in fall 2000.; In March 2002, a plan to revise service on the Bx1, Bx2, and Bx41 routes in Mott Haven by extending the Bx1 and Bx2 to a new terminal at Lincoln Avenue and East 138th Street and truncating the Bx41 to East 149th Street and Third Avenue was announced. The Bx41 would have a terminal loop consisting of Third Avenue, East 146th Street, Willis Avenue, East 147th Street, and Third Avenue. At the time, the Bx1 had terminated at the 138th Street–Grand Concourse subway station, while the Bx2 had terminated at East 147th Street and Third Avenue near the Third Avenue–149th Street subway station. The changes were intended to improve service reliability on the Bx1 and Bx2 by consolidating route supervision at their new terminal. There was no dispatcher at Grand Concourse and East 138th Street, and without full supervision, trips were often out of order when they merged at Grand Concourse and East 165th Street. The truncation of the Bx41 made the changes cost-neutral and ensured there would not be too many buses in the vicinity of East 138th Street and Lincoln Avenue. About 1,000 Bx41 daily riders would need to transfer with the changes. The changes took effect on September 8, 2002.; In 2009, as part of Phase II of the MTA and New York City Department of Transportation (DOT)'s Select Bus Service (SBS), both the Third Avenue and Webster Avenue bus corridors were studied for the implementation of a north-to-south bus rapid transit service through the South Bronx.; The Bx41 along Webster Avenue was chosen for Select Bus Service since it would serve more riders and was wider, making it easier to accommodate bus lanes. In April 2013, the MTA Board approved the planned replacement of limited-stop service with Select Bus Service. The Bx41 SBS would make all the same stops as limited-stop service except or northbound stops at 189th Street and Westchester Avenue. Bx41 SBS service would use a new off-street stop at the Gun Hill Intermodal Terminal to improve the connection to the subway. The span of service would increase from being peak-hour-only to operating between 6 a.m. and 9:30 p.m.. Service on the Bx41 would increased 30 percent on weekdays, 22 percent on Saturdays, and 51 percent on Sundays. Offset bus lanes were installed between East 165th Street and East Gun Hill Road. Due to street modifications related to the bus lane at Tremont Avenue, westbound Bx36 and eastbound Bx40 and Bx42 buses were rerouted off one block of Webster Avenue and onto Valentine Avenue between East 178th Street and Tremont Avenue. As part of the changes, the Bx55 Limited along Third Avenue would be discontinued, and service between The Hub and Fordham Plaza would be replaced by the Bx15 Limited. The Bx15 Limited would run along the route of the Bx15 local between Fordham Plaza and 12th Avenue and West 125th Street in Manhattan at all times except late nights and weekends, and the Bx15 local would be truncated to The Hub when the Bx15 limited operated. It would make all the same stops as the Bx55 Limited south of Fordham Road except for East 174th Street, and the southbound East 161st Street stop. Service between Gun Hill Road and White Plains Road and Fordham Road would be discontinued; alternate Bx55 Limited trips had previously run along this section, making the same stops as the Bx41 Limited. The Bx41 change took effect on June 30, 2013, while the Bx15 changes took effect on July 1, 2013. The implementation of Bx41 SBS increased operating costs by $1.28 million a year, including $700,000 in cost savings from replacing the Bx55 with the Bx15 Limited.
Bx46	New route introduced on April 7, 2013, as a replacement for the Barretto Point Park Shuttle.; Original seasonal shuttle service began in June 2008, running summer weekends only.; Original south-western terminus was at Longwood Avenue ( trains). Original south-eastern terminus was the Barretto Point Park at Tiffany Street-Viele Avenue.; Seasonal summer service ran in 2008 and 2009 before being discontinued on June 27, 2010 due to a budget crisis, but was restored in Summer 2012 due to high demand.; Service was extended from both ends, running between Prospect Avenue ( trains) and the Hunts Point Cooperative Market via Longwood Avenue ( trains) and Barretto Point Park via Viele Avenue.

=== 2020s redesign ===
As part of the MTA's 2017 Fast Forward Plan to speed up mass transit service, a draft plan for a reorganization of Bronx bus routes was proposed in draft format in June 2019, with a final version published in October 2019. Many of the draft proposals were not included in the final version. These changes were set to take effect in mid-2020. Due to the COVID-19 pandemic, the implementation of the bus redesign was postponed by two years. The Bx28 and Bx34 routes were originally proposed to be modified as well, but those changes were reverted in late 2021. The redesign took effect on June 26, 2022.

== Former routes ==
=== July 1974 renumbered prefixed routes ===
On July 1, 1974, a few routes were combined with then-existing routes or eliminated, and most prefixed routes were renumbered:

Old route	New route	Terminals		Streets traveled	Notes
Bx5A	Bx54	Longwood; West Farms Road-Southern Boulevard near Simpson Street station ( trains)	Parkchester; Hugh Grant Circle near Parkchester station ( trains); Parkchester; Metropolitan Oval-Purdy Street	Bruckner Boulevard, White Plains Road, Metropolitan Oval	Same route, new number.; The Board of Estimate approved a resolution granting MaBSTOA permission to start route Bx5A Story Avenue on January 9, 1964.; Service was introduced in November 1967, as part of the Bx5 between West Farms Road-Southern Boulevard (near Simpson Street ( trains)) and White Plains Road.; Short-turn service to Parkchester ( trains) was discontinued.
Bx6	Bx40	Westchester Square; Lane Avenue-East Tremont Avenue at Westchester Square–East Tremont Avenue station ( trains)	Throgs Neck; Fort Schuyler; Edgewater Park; Adee Drive	Tremont Avenue, Lawton Avenue, Pennyfield Avenue	Same route, new number.; Originally served either terminal. All Fort Schuyler-bound and Locust Point-bound buses started serving Edgewater Park.; Original Bx40 service was rerouted away from Bruckner Boulevard-Balcom Avenue, and former Bx6 service became part of the rerouted Bx40 service, running all times.
Bx6A	Bx40	Westchester Square; Lane Avenue-East Tremont Avenue at Westchester Square–East Tremont Avenue station ( trains)	Locust Point; Longstreet Avenue-Tierney Place	Tremont Avenue, Lawton Avenue	Same route, new number.; Original Bx40 service was rerouted away from Bruckner Boulevard-Balcom Avenue, and former Bx6A service became part of the rerouted Bx40 service, running all times except nights.
Bx6B	Bx40	Westchester Square; Lane Avenue-East Tremont Avenue at Westchester Square–East Tremont Avenue station ( trains)	Throgs Neck; Harding Avenue-Emerson Avenue	Tremont Avenue, Harding Avenue	Same route, new number.; Original Bx40 service was rerouted away from Bruckner Boulevard-Balcom Avenue, and former Bx6B service became part of the rerouted Bx40 service, running all times except nights.
Bx6C	Bx40	Westchester Square; Lane Avenue-East Tremont Avenue at Westchester Square–East Tremont Avenue station ( trains)	Throgs Neck Houses; Dewey Avenue-Schley Avenue	Tremont Avenue	Same route, new number.; Former Bx6C service became part of the weekday rush hour-only Bx40 service.
Bx10B	Bx10	Riverdale; Riverdale Avenue-West 262nd Street	Inwood, Manhattan; Broadway-West 207th Street at Inwood-West 207th Street station ( train)	Broadway, Riverdale Avenue	Service was introduced in October 1958, originally running to Waldo Avenue-Manhattan College Parkway via Riverdale Avenue.; Service was later extended to run towards Fieldston Road-West 256th Street in November 1967, also becoming part of former Bx10 service, running weekday rush-hours only.
Bx14A	Bx9	Williamsbridge; White Plains Road-East 233rd Street at 233rd Street station ( trains)	Edenwald; Laconia Avenue-East 229th Street	East 233rd Street	Original terminus was at Williamsbridge-East 225th Street ( trains). Bx8 service was extended to Williamsbridge and former terminus at Burke Avenue was discontinued.; Former Bx14A service became part of the extended Bx9 service to 233rd Street ( trains), but service at Edenwald Houses was discontinued.
Bx15A	Bx6	Norwood; East 206th Street-Bainbridge Avenue at 205th Street station ( train)	Baychester; Boston Road-Eastchester Road	Gun Hill Road, Boston Road	Same route, new number, except that service was partially cut back to Corsa Avenue.
Bx15B	Bx19	Wakefield; White Plains Road–East 241st Street at 241st Street station ( train)	Baychester; Boston Road-Eastchester Road	Baychester Avenue, Schieffelin Avenue	Same route, new number.
Bx19	Bx12	Fordham; Southern Boulevard-East 189th Street	Inwood, Manhattan; Broadway-West 207th Street at Inwood-West 207th Street station ( train)	Fordham Road, 207th Street	Same route, new number.; Service merged with the Bx12, and Southern Boulevard terminus was discontinued.
Bx21	Bx22	Pelham Bay Park; Bruckner Boulevard-Westchester Avenue at Pelham Bay Park station ( trains)	Westchester Square; Westchester Square-East Tremont Avenue at Westchester Square station ( trains)	Jarvia Avenue, Middletown Road, Edison Avenue	Service merged with former Bx22 service from Pelham Bay Park to Country Club.; Former Bx22 terminus at Buhre Avenue ( trains) and service west of Bruckner Boulevard were discontinued.

=== February 1984 Bronx bus route revamp ===
On February 19, 1984, the entire Bronx bus system was revamped, with several routes renumbered, merged or eliminated, although a few retained their original numbers (not listed below). 15 routes were renumbered, but kept intact, and four new routes were created. Prior to the change, buses displayed signs showing both old and new numbers to simplify the change. The changes were as follows:

Old route	New route	Old route terminals		Streets traveled	Notes
Bx3	Bx17	Port Morris; East 138th Street-Jackson Avenue at Cypress Avenue station ( train)	Fordham; Fordham Plaza (at Fordham railroad station)	Prospect Avenue, Crotona Avenue	Portion of route south of Prospect Ave-East 149th Street via Jackson Avenue was discontinued, and full-time service started running past East 149th Street.; An extension of the old Bx3, service was rerouted to serve Southern Boulevard, Bruckner Expressway, and the Port Morris neighborhood between Brook Avenue and Walnut Avenue, replacing former Bx30 and Bx31 services.
Bx4	Bx34	Fordham; Fordham Road-Valentine Avenue near Fordham Road station ( trains)	Woodlawn; Katonah Avenue-East 242nd Street (New York City-Yonkers line)	Bainbridge Avenue, Valentine Avenue, Katonah Avenue	Same route, new number.
Bx6	Bx30	Norwood; East 206th Street-Bainbridge Avenue at 205th Street station ( train)	Baychester; Boston Road-Corsa Avenue	Gun Hill Road, Boston Road	Same route, new number.; One of two services merged with former Bx7 service to create a newly expanded and rerouted Bx30 service (see below).
Bx7	Bx16, Bx30	Pelham Parkway; Pelham Parkway-White Plains Road at Pelham Parkway station ( trains)	Eastchester; Ropes Avenue-Boston Road (New York City-Pelham line)	Bronx Park East, Allerton Avenue, Boston Road (upper portion)	One of two services merged with former Bx6 service to create a newly expanded and rerouted Bx30 service (see above).; Boston Road segment between East Gun Hill Road and Conner Street was merged with former Bx6 service, and then rerouted to serve Co-op City-Bellamy Loop.; Boston Road segment between Dyre Avenue and Ropes Avenue was replaced by a newly created, split branched Bx16 service.; Remainder of the route south of East Gun Hill Road was discontinued. Service was assumed by the Bee Line #60/61 route, which became open-door along Boston Road.
Bx9	Bx31	Williamsbridge; White Plains Road-East 233rd Street at 233rd Street station ( trains)	Westchester Square; Lane Avenue-East Tremont Avenue at Westchester Square–East Tremont Avenue station ( trains)	Eastchester Road, East 233rd Street	Same route, new number.
Bx10	Bx7	Riverdale; Riverdale Avenue-West 263rd Street	Inwood, Manhattan; Broadway-West 207th Street at 207th Street station ( train)	Riverdale Avenue, Henry Hudson Parkway, Broadway	Same route, new number. Service was renumbered to avoid confusion with a newly created Bx10 service introduced on this date.; Weekday rush-hour only split branched service to Fieldston Road-West 256th Street was eliminated.
Bx13	Bx22	Pelham Parkway; Pelham Parkway-White Plains Road at Pelham Parkway station ( trains)	Castle Hill; Castle Hill Avenue-Zerega Avenue	Castle Hill Avenue, Unionport Road, White Plains Road	Same route, new number.; Service was extended to serve Fordham Center-Valentine Avenue (near Fordham Road station ( train)) all times except nights, and Bedford Park (near Bedford Park Boulevard station ( train)) weekdays only.; Split branched service (buses originating from Bedford Park and Pelham Parkway only) also ran to Clasons Point via Lacombe Avenue and White Plains Road, running all times except late afternoon, evenings and nights.
Bx14	Bx16	Williamsbridge; White Plains Road-East 233rd Street at 233rd Street station ( trains)	Eastchester; Ropes Avenue-Boston Road (New York City-Pelham line)	Edenwald Avenue, Seton Avenue, East 233rd Street, Dyre Avenue	One of two services merged to create a new split branched service (see former Bx19).; Service between East 233rd St-Seton Avenue and Pelham Manor-Ropes Avenue was merged with former Bx19 service at Baychester Avenue (segment between Nereid Avenue and East 233rd Street).; Edenwald Avenue and Seton Avenue services were discontinued.
Bx15	Bx28	Fordham; Valentine Avenue-East 192nd Street	Co-op City; Earhart Lane-Erksine Place	Gun Hill Road, Bartow Avenue, Co-op City Boulevard	Same route, new number.
Bx17	Bx26	Fordham; Valentine Avenue-East 192nd Street; Bedford Park; Paul Avenue-East 205th Street near Bedford Park Boulevard–Lehman College station ( train)	Co-op City; Earhart Lane-Erksine Place	Bedford Park Boulevard, Allerton Avenue, Bartow Avenue, Co-op City Boulevard	Same route, new number.
Bx19	Bx16, Bx31	Wakefield; White Plains Road–East 241st Street at 241st Street station ( train)	Baychester; Boston Road-Eastchester Road	Baychester Avenue, Schieffelin Avenue	One of two services merged to create a new split branched service (see former Bx14).; Baychester Avenue segment between Nereid Avenue and East 233rd Street was merged with former Bx14 service (segment between East 233rd St-Seton Avenue and Pelham Manor-Ropes Avenue).; Remainder of the route was discontinued, with southern portion partially replaced by Bx31.
Bx20	Bx9	Riverdale; Broadway-West 262nd Street	West Farms; East Tremont Avenue-Boston Road at West Farms Square–East Tremont Avenue station ( trains)	Broadway, Kingsbridge Road, Fordham Road	Same route, new number.
Bx21	N/A	Port Morris; East 138th Street-Jackson Avenue at Cypress Avenue station ( train)	Astoria; 37th Street-24th Avenue	Triborough Bridge	Route was discontinued due to low ridership.
Bx22	Bx14	Westchester Square; Lane Avenue-East Tremont Avenue at Westchester Square–East Tremont Avenue station ( trains)	Country Club; Research Avenue-Ampere Avenue	Westchester Avenue, Bruckner Boulevard, Country Club Road	Same route, new number.; Service was extended to Parkchester-Hugh Grant Circle (at Parkchester ( trains)) via Westchester Avenue.
Bx25	Bx32	Mott Haven; Lincoln Avenue-East 136th Street near Third Avenue–138th Street station ( trains)	Kingsbridge; Reservoir Avenue-West 195th Street near Kingsbridge Road station ( train)	Jerome Avenue, Morris Avenue	Same route, new number.; Service to Reservoir Avenue-West 195th Street (near Kingsbridge Road ( train)) was expanded to run all times except nights.
Bx26	Bx21	Mott Haven; Lincoln Avenue-East 136th Street near Third Avenue–138th Street station ( trains)	Morris Park; Eastchester Road-Sackett Avenue	Third Avenue, Boston Road (lower), Morris Park Avenue	Same route, new number.; Service was extended to Westchester Square ( trains) via Eastchester Road.
Bx28	Bx10, Bx39, Bx40	Bedford Park; Paul Avenue-West 205th Street near Bedford Park Boulevard station ( train)	Tremont; Grand Concourse-East Burnside Avenue near Tremont Avenue station ( train)	White Plains Road, Morris Park Avenue, East Tremont Avenue	In Fiscal Year 1963, this route was extended on a six-month trial basis to accommodate students.; Portion of route between Bainbridge Avenue and Bedford Park Boulevard became part of the newly created Bx10 service.; Portion of rush hour-only route between Bedford Park and White Plains Road (via East Gun Hill Road) was retained, but not officially acknowledged in Bronx Bus Map editions until 1990.; Portion of route between West Farms Square–East Tremont Avenue ( trains) and Grand Concourse-Burnside Avenue (near Tremont Avenue ( train)) via Tremont Avenue was discontinued, replaced by Bx40 service.
Bx29	Bx15	Fordham; Fordham Plaza (at Fordham railroad station)	Harlem; 12th Avenue-West 125th Street	Third Avenue, Willis Avenue, 125th Street	Same route, new number.; Southbound service started running at Third Avenue instead of Washington Avenue.
Bx30	Bx19	Mott Haven; Southern Boulevard-East 142nd Street	Harlem; Broadway-West 145th Street at 145th Street station ( train)	149th Street, 145th Street	One of two services merged with former Bx31 service to create a newly expanded and rerouted Bx19 service (see below).; Eastern section at Bruckner Expressway and East 149th Street were discontinued, with Southern Boulevard section being replaced by rerouted Bx17 service.
Bx31	Bx19	Bronx Park; New York Botanical Garden	Port Morris; Cypress Avenue-East 133rd Street	Southern Boulevard	One of two services merged with former Bx30 service to create a newly expanded and rerouted Bx19 service (see above).; Port Morris section was discontinued, with service being replaced by rerouted Bx17 service.
Bx32	N/A	Melrose; Third Avenue-East 161st Street	Port Morris; St. Ann's Avenue-East 132nd Street	St. Ann's Avenue	Route was discontinued due to low ridership. Service was not replaced until the Bx17 was rerouted to partially serve St. Anns Avenue in September 2005.
Bx34	Bx6	Hunts Point Cooperative Market	Washington Heights, Manhattan; Riverside Drive-West 158th Street	Hunts Point Avenue, 163rd Street, 161st Street, 155th Street	Same route, new number.
Bx34A	Bx6	Hunts Point Cooperative Market	Hunts Point; Tiffany Street	Oak Point Avenue, Viele Avenue, Food Center Drive	Same rush-hour only route, new number.
Bx37	Bx13	Yankee Stadium; East 161st Street-River Avenue at 161st Street–River Avenue station ( trains train)	Washington Heights; Broadway-West 181 Street at 181st Street station ( train)	Odgen Avenue	Same route, new number.
Bx38	Bx3	Riverdale; Broadway-West 238th Street at 238th Street station ( train)	Washington Heights, Manhattan; Broadway-West 181 Street at 181st Street station ( train)	University Avenue, Sedgwick Avenue	Same route, new number.
Bx42	Bx4	Westchester Square; Lane Avenue-East Tremont Avenue at Westchester Square–East Tremont Avenue station( trains)	The Hub; Third Avenue-Westchester Avenue near Third Avenue–149th Street station ( trains)	Westchester Avenue	Same route, new number.
Bx49	Bx13	Yankee Stadium; East 161st Street-River Avenue at 161st Street–River Avenue station ( trains train)	Washington Heights, Manhattan; Broadway-West 181 Street at 181st Street station ( train)	Woodycrest Avenue, Nelson Avenue, Anderson Avenue	Former service became part of the Bx13 as a rush hour-only, split branched service (running in one-way directions at Woodycrest Avenue and Anderson Avenue).; This weekday rush hour-only service only ran between El Grant Highway-West 174th Street and Third Avenue-East 163rd Street from 6:30am-9am and 2:30pm-4pm.

=== Discontinued services ===
Route	Replacement route(s)	Terminals		Major streets	History
Bx7 (first use)	Bx16, Bx30	Pelham Parkway; Pelham Parkway-White Plains Road at Pelham Parkway station ( trains)	Eastchester; Ropes Avenue-Boston Road (New York City-Pelham line)	Bronx Park East, Allerton Avenue, Boston Road (upper portion)	Service originally ran weekdays and Saturdays only, running every 60 minutes.; Boston Road segment north of East Gun Hill Road was used to extend the newly created Bx16 and Bx30 services to Pelham Manor and Co-op City, respectively.; Boston Road segment south of East Gun Hill Road was replaced by the Bee Line #60/61 route, operating as an open-door route along Boston Road, later on 6/26/2022 was also replaced by the Bx30 to Pelham Parkway.
Bx10A	M100	Spuyten Duyvil; Henry Hudson Parkway-West 239th Street	Inwood, Manhattan; Broadway-West 207th Street at Inwood-West 207th Street station ( train)	Broadway, Henry Hudson Parkway	Introduced in October 1958 as a split branched service for former Bx10 service, running towards Henry Hudson Parkway-West 239th Street via Spuyten Duyvil.; This route was discontinued on February 14, 1965, with the extension of the M100 from Broadway and West 230th Street (near 231st Street ( train)) to 239th Street and Riverdale Avenue. The extension of the M100 ran via 231st Street, Irwin Avenue, Johnson Avenue, Kappock Street, the Henry Hudson Parkway service road, 239th Street, and Riverdale Avenue.
Bx14 (first use)	Bx16	Williamsbridge; White Plains Road-East 233rd Street at 233rd Street station ( trains)	Eastchester; Ropes Avenue-Boston Road (New York City-Pelham line)	Edenwald Avenue, Seton Avenue, East 233rd Street, Dyre Avenue	Service operated all times except nights, running every 15–20 minutes during middays and evenings and every 36–46 minutes during the weekends.; On February 16, 1970, service was extended from Dyre Avenue and East 233rd Street to Ropes Avenue and Boston Road at the City Line.; Portion of route between East 233rd Street-Seton Avenue and Pelham Manor-Ropes Avenue merged with former Bx19 service at Baychester Avenue to create a split branched Bx16 service.; Service at Edenwald Avenue and Seton Avenue were discontinued.
Bx14 (second use)	Bx4A, Bx24	Parkchester; Hugh Grant Circle near Parkchester station ( trains)	Country Club; Ampere Avenue-Research Avenue	Metropolitan Avenue, East Tremont Avenue, Westchester Avenue, Bruckner Boulevard	Country Club bus began in 1933, replacing Pelham Bay Park Line streetcars on August 17, 1940. Formerly Bx21 and Bx22 services.; Original western terminus was at Buhre Avenue ( trains). Service merged with former Bx21 service from Pelham Bay Park to Westchester Square, and former Bx22 service at Middletown Road and Edison Avenue were discontinued.; Service was later extended to Parkchester ( trains) via Westchester Avenue in February 1984 and later rerouted to serve former Bx54 service at Metropolitan Oval in September 1990.; Originally served the New York City Children's Center Bronx Campus at Waters Place-Hospital Road until September 1990, when the Bx21 replaced it.; Route was discontinued on June 27, 2010 due to a budget crisis. Country Club service between Crosby Avenue and Layton Avenue temporarily became part of the rerouted Bx8 via Pelham Bay and Stadium Avenue until January 2011, when it was replaced by the Bx24.; Metropolitan Oval service was restored in January 2011 as the Bx4A.; Bx24 service was introduced to serve Country Club in January 2011. Service was later extended to Westchester Square ( trains) in 2012, officially reviving the pre-February 1984 former Bx14 service.
Bx19 (first use)	Bx16, Bx31	Wakefield; White Plains Road–East 241st Street at 241st Street station ( train)	Baychester; Boston Road-Eastchester Road	Baychester Avenue, Schieffelin Avenue	Originally known as the Bx15A, service was renumbered in July 1974.; Only ran weekday rush hours only, running every 40 minutes.; Baychester Avenue segment between Nereid Avenue and East 233rd Street was merged with former Bx14 service to create a split branched Bx16 service, and southern portion at Edenwald Houses was partially replaced by the Bx31 in February 1984.
Bx21 (first use)	N/A	Port Morris; East 138th Street-Jackson Avenue at Cypress Avenue station ( train)	Astoria; 37th Street-24th Avenue	Triborough Bridge	Originally known as the TB, service was renamed the Bx21 in July 1974, and later discontinued in February 1984 due to low ridership.
Bx23 (first use)	Bx8	Pelham Bay; Westchester Avenue-Buhre Avenue at Buhre Avenue station ( trains)	Throgs Neck; Ellsworth Avenue-Schley Avenue	Crosby Avenue, Layton Avenue, Dean Avenue	Service merged with the Bx8 in September 1989, along with former Bx40 split branched services at Edgewater Park and Locust Point.
Bx24 (first use)	N/A	Fordham; Fordham Plaza-Third Avenue (at Fordham Metro-North station)	Riverdale; Fieldston Road-West 256th Street	Fordham Road, Bailey Avenue, Henry Hudson Parkway, Riverdale Avenue	Was the A Bailey Avenue Line streetcar route.; Replaced by bus service on June 27, 1948.; Original northern terminus was Bailey Avenue-West 231st Street (near 231st Street ( train)). Service was later extended to West 246th Street and Henry Hudson Parkway.; Service was extended to Fieldston Road and West 256th Street on September 14, 1970.; Formerly a weekday-only service, Saturday service was instituted in 1977. Service now ran during the day except late afternoon, evenings, nights and Sundays.; Service also short-turned at Broadway-West 231st Street ( train) early mornings and during the early afternoon hours; Service was eliminated on September 10, 1995, due to a budget crisis. Service was partially replaced by the Bx7, Bx10, Bx12, and Bx20, but Fieldston Avenue service was not replaced by any bus.
Bx25 (second use)	Bx25 (2022), Bx26	Bedford Park; Paul Avenue-West 205th Street near Bedford Park Boulevard station ( train)	Co-op City; Earhart Lane	Bedford Park Blvd, Allerton Av, Bartow Av	Designation began on September 10, 2000, as a rush hour-only service, serving only Asch Loop.; In March 2000, the MTA announced plans to simplify Bx26 and Bx28 service, which had complicated service patterns. As part of the changes, Bx26 Asch Loop bypass service that ran directly to the southern portion of Co-op City would be expanded in the morning to run between 6:20 a.m. and 8:20 a.m., and would be added in the afternoon rush hour between 5 p.m. and 7 p.m.. This service would be renumbered to the Bx25 to reduce rider confusion. The changes took effect on September 10, 2000.; Route was discontinued on June 27, 2010 and replaced by the Bx26, due to a budget crisis. Service was reinstated on June 26, 2022 to restore section 1-2-3 service, terminating at Bay Plaza.
Bx32 (first use)	N/A	Melrose; Third Avenue-East 161st Street	Port Morris; St. Ann's Avenue-East 132nd Street	St. Ann's Avenue	Service originally ran all times except evenings, weekend late afternoon and nights, running every 36 minutes.; Route was discontinued due to low ridership, and service at St. Anns Avenue was partially replaced by the Bx17 in September 2005.
Bx39 (first use)	N/A	Morris Heights; Undercliff Avenue	East Tremont; Tremont Avenue-3rd Avenue	Sedgwick Avenue	Was the S Sedgwick Avenue Line streetcar route.; Replaced by bus service on June 27, 1948.; Discontinued in 1953.
Bx43	N/A	Broadway and 230th	Yonkers	Broadway	This trolley route was converted to bus and given to Yonkers Railroad Company as Yonkers Railroad Company Route 2 in 1952.
Bx44	N/A	Bainbridge and Gun Hill	Yonkers	Bainbridge and Jerome Avenues (now Major Deegan Expressway)	This trolley route was discontinued by 1952.
Bx45	Bx29 (now Bx15)	Mott Haven; Third Avenue and 138th Street	Manhattan; Second Avenue and 125th Street	Third Avenue, 128th Street, and Second Avenue	This trolley route was converted to bus and became part of the Bx29, now the Bx15, by 1947.
Bx46 (first use)	N/A	Eastchester; Boston Road and Dyre Avenue	Mount Vernon	Dyre Avenue and 5th Avenue	This bus route was given to Westchester Street Transportation as Westchester Street Transportation Route C in 1950.
Bx47	N/A	Williamsbridge; 225th Street and White Plains Road	Mount Vernon	White Plains Road	This trolley route was converted to bus and given to Westchester Street Transportation as Westchester Street Transportation Route B in 1950.
Bx48	N/A	Eastchester	New Rochelle	White Plains Road	This trolley route was converted to bus and given to Westchester Street Transportation as Westchester Street Transportation Route A in 1950.
Bx49 (first use)	N/A	Parkchester	West Farms		Discontinued on June 6, 1943.
Bx50 (first use)	Bx49 (now Bx13)	Yankee Stadium; East 161st Street-River Avenue at 161st Street–River Avenue station ( trains train)	Washington Heights, Manhattan; Broadway-West 181 Street at 181st Street station ( train)	Woodycrest Avenue, Nelson Avenue, Anderson Avenue	Discontinued on June 6, 1943, due to WWII, but restored at the end of 1945 as Bx49.
Bx50 (second use)	N/A		Freedomland U.S.A.		Summer seasonal service was first introduced on June 19, 1960, from June 19 to September 14.; Discontinued on September 14, 1964, when Freedomland U.S.A. went bankrupt.; Bx50 was proposed in February 2008 as a limited-stop bus route from Fordham Plaza and LaGuardia Airport, but this proposal was cancelled on June 27, 2010, due to a budget crisis.
Bx52	N/A	Co-op City; Earhart Lane-Erskine Place	Orchard Beach	Baychester Avenue, Shore Road, City Island Road	Summer seasonal service was first introduced on July 21, 1970, running from Memorial Day to Labor Day only.; Seasonal service last ran in September 1989. Subsequent weekend-only trips was replaced with Bx5 service.
Bx54	Bx5, Bx14	Longwood; West Farms Road-Southern Boulevard near Simpson Street station ( trains)	Parkchester; Purdy Street-Metropolitan Avenue	Story Avenue, White Plains Road, Metropolitan Avenue	Introduced on January 20, 1964, as the Bx5A, it was part of the Bx5 until July 1974 when it was renamed the Bx54, becoming a stand-alone service.; Original northern terminus was at Parkchester ( trains). Service was later extended through Purdy Street via Metropolitan Avenue in November 1967, though short turn service to Parkchester was retained until July 1974.; Service was discontinued in September 1990. The Bx14 was rerouted to serve Parkchester via Metropolitan Avenue until June 2010 and was replaced by the Bx4A in January 2011.; Bx5 weekday short-turn service to White Plains Road was instituted after the Bx54's elimination.
Bx55	Bx15, Bx41	The Hub; East 149th Street-Third Avenue at Third Avenue–149th Street station ( trains)	Williamsbridge; White Plains Road-East Gun Hill Road at Gun Hill Road station ( trains)	Third Avenue, Webster Avenue	Formerly Bx55X; the new route replaced the Bronx portion of the Third Avenue Elevated Line on April 29, 1973, stopping only at its former stations, and allowing free transfers to intersecting subway lines.; Service was one of the few routes in the city to allow free transfers to the subway prior to the introduction of the MetroCard in 1993, and one of the first routes to use the MetroCard. Paper tickets were used prior to the use of MetroCard for free transfers at Third Avenue–149th Street.; Some trips also ran to Yankee Stadium ( trains and train) via East 161st Street until June 1995, stopping only at Washington Avenue and River Avenue. The branch was discontinued to improve service for riders and to improve reliability. While only 5% of riders used this branch, it received 21% of service on weekdays and 25% of service on weekends. Bx6 service was increased to mitigate the need to transfer to get to Yankee Stadium. In addition, free transfers were allowed between the Bx55 and intersecting bus routes, changing the route from a rapid transit replacement to a limited-stop branch of the Bx15.; In 1995, New York City Transit was in the process of building a weather-protected intermodal terminal at Third Avenue–149th Street.; Southbound buses originally traveled via Washington Avenue and service between East 161st Street and 149th Street ran at Melrose Avenue in both directions until February 1984, when all service was shifted over to Third Avenue.; Service was slowly cut after the MetroCard's introduction with free transfers to other buses and the subway.; Overnight service was cut to Fordham Plaza on all trips on September 10, 1995 due to a budget crisis.; Late night service (between 1 a.m. and 4:30 a.m.) was eliminated on September 8, 1996, and was merged with Bx15 service. Supplemental Bx15 service was provided between Fordham Road and 149th Street to maintain the Bx55's frequency. To maintain the transfer to the subway, bus-subway transfers were accepted on the Bx15 overnight. The change was made to eliminate duplicative service, which was lightly patronized.; Select weekday and all weekend trips terminated at Fordham Plaza in February 2004; All weekend and evening services were eliminated on June 27, 2010, due to another budget crisis.; All Bx55 service was discontinued on June 28, 2013. Third Avenue service was replaced by the Bx15 local and Limited-Stop services, while Webster Avenue service north of Fordham Plaza was replaced by the Bx41 Local and Select Bus Services.
Bx56	N/A	Concourse; Grand Concourse - 161st Street	Counter-clockwise loop		Also known as Culture Bus Loop III, a short-lived weekend route with stops at points of interest in The Bronx and Upper Manhattan. Operated from August 3, 1974 until the end of 1974.
Bx99		Woodlawn-Jerome Avenue station ( train)	West Village, Manhattan; Spring and Greenwich Streets		Started in 2020 during COVID-19 crisis, when subway service was shut down for overnight cleaning.; Last ran in June 2021.
Barretto Point Park Shuttle (BPSH)	Bx46	Hunts Point; Hunts Point Avenue-Southern Boulevard at Hunts Point Avenue station ( trains)	Barretto Point Park		Began on June 27, 2008, as a summer weekend-only service. Originally, the western terminus was at Prospect Avenue ( trains).; Seasonal summer service ran in 2008 and 2009 before being discontinued on June 27, 2010 due to a budget crisis, but was restored in Summer 2012 due to high demand.; Service was replaced in 2013 by the Bx46, but service runs from Prospect Avenue ( trains) to the Hunts Point Cooperative Market via Longwood Avenue ( trains) and Barretto Point Park.
