= Prospect Avenue station (IRT White Plains Road Line) =

New York City Subway station in the Bronx

Prospect Avenue
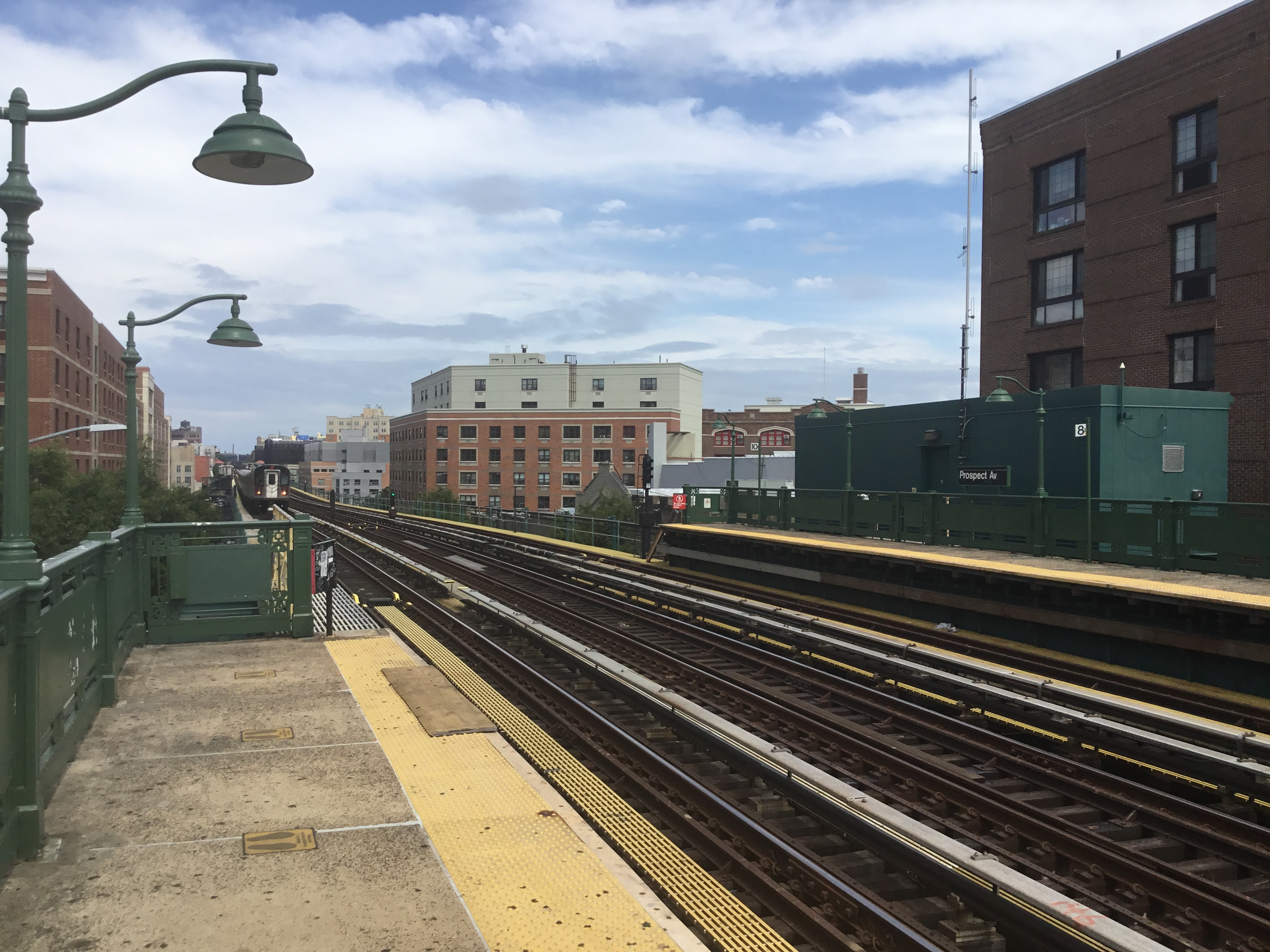
- Prospect Avenue in 2021

Station statistics
- Address: Prospect & Westchester Avenues; Bronx, New York
- Borough: The Bronx
- Locale: Longwood
- Coordinates: 40.819°N 73.901°W
- Division: A (IRT)
- Line: IRT White Plains Road Line
- Services: 2 (all times); 5 (all times except rush hours in the peak direction and late nights)
- Transit: NYCT Bus: Bx4, Bx17, Bx46
- Structure: Elevated
- Platforms: 2 side platforms
- Tracks: 3

Other information
- Opened: November 26, 1904; 121 years ago (3rd Ave. Line; Bergen Avenue By-pass); July 10, 1905; 121 years ago (White Plains Rd. Line)
- Accessible: No; planned

Traffic
- 2025: 1,310,664 ▲8.6%
- Rank: 259 out of 423
Services
Preceding station	New York City Subway	Following station
Intervale Avenue 2 5 via East 180th Street	Local	Jackson Avenue 2 5 toward Flatbush Avenue–Brooklyn College
Location
Location within New York City Subway
Location within New York City
Location within New York
Track layout
Street map
Station service legend
Symbol	Description
Stops all times except rush hours in the peak direction	Stops all times except rush hours in the peak direction
Stops all times	Stops all times
- Prospect Avenue Subway Station (IRT)
- U.S. National Register of Historic Places
- MPS: New York City Subway System MPS
- NRHP reference No.: 04001026
- Added to NRHP: September 17, 2004

The Prospect Avenue station is a local station on the IRT White Plains Road Line of the New York City Subway. Located at the intersection of Prospect and Westchester Avenues in the Longwood neighborhood of the Bronx, it is served by the 2 train at all times, and the 5 train at all times except late nights and rush hours in the peak direction.

== History ==
=== Early history ===
The initial segment of the IRT White Plains Road Line opened on November 26, 1904 between 180th Street–Bronx Park and Jackson Avenue. Initially, trains on the line were served by elevated trains from the IRT Second Avenue Line and the IRT Third Avenue Line. Once the connection to the IRT Lenox Avenue Line opened on July 10, 1905, trains from the newly opened IRT subway ran via the line.

To address overcrowding, in 1909, the New York Public Service Commission proposed lengthening the platforms at stations along the original IRT subway. As part of a modification to the IRT's construction contracts made on January 18, 1910, the company was to lengthen station platforms to accommodate ten-car express and six-car local trains. In addition to $1.5 million (equivalent to $51.8 million in 2025) spent on platform lengthening, $500,000 (equivalent to $17.3 million in 2025) was spent on building additional entrances and exits. It was anticipated that these improvements would increase capacity by 25 percent. The northbound platform at the Prospect Avenue station was extended about 80 feet (24 m) to the front and 50 feet (15 m) to the rear, while the southbound platform was not lengthened. On January 23, 1911, ten-car express trains began running on the White Plains Road Line.

=== Later years ===
The New York State Transit Commission announced plans to extend the southbound platforms at seven stations on the line from Jackson Avenue to 177th Street to accommodate ten-car trains for $81,900 on August 8, 1934. The platform at Prospect Avenue would be lengthened from 349 feet (106 m) to 496 feet (151 m).

The city government took over the IRT's operations on June 12, 1940. The Bergen Avenue cutoff, which allowed Third Avenue trains to access the White Plains Road Line, was abandoned on November 5, 1946, as part of the gradual curtailment of elevated service on the IRT Third Avenue Line. On June 13, 1949, the platform extensions at this station, as well as those on White Plains Road Line stations between Jackson Avenue and 177th Street, opened. The platforms were lengthened to 514 feet (157 m) to allow full ten-car express trains to open their doors. Previously the stations could only accommodate six-car local trains.

This station was listed on the National Register of Historic Places on September 17, 2004. It was renovated in 2006. As part of its 2025–2029 Capital Program, the MTA has proposed making the station wheelchair-accessible in compliance with the Americans with Disabilities Act of 1990.

== Station layout ==
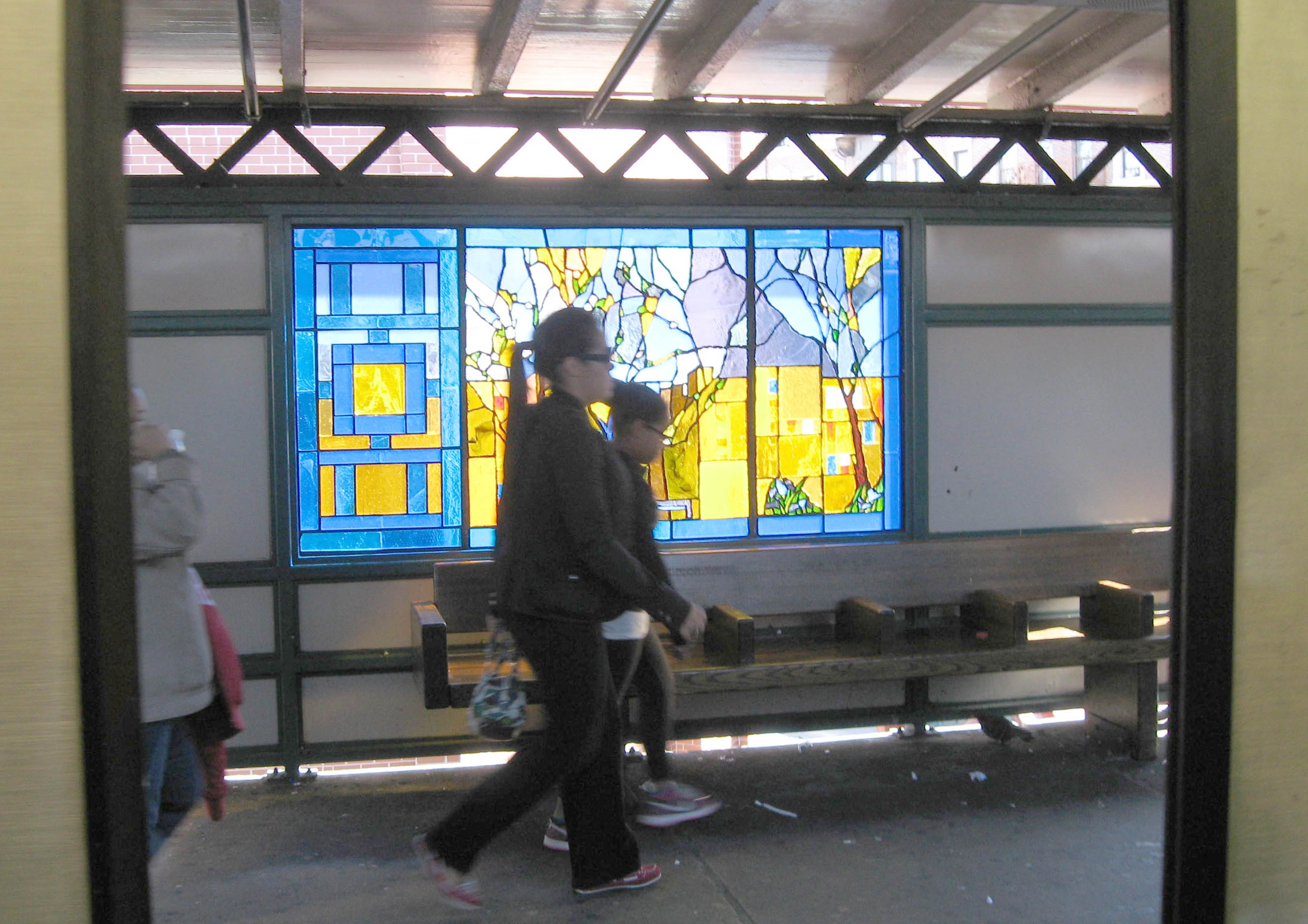
Artwork

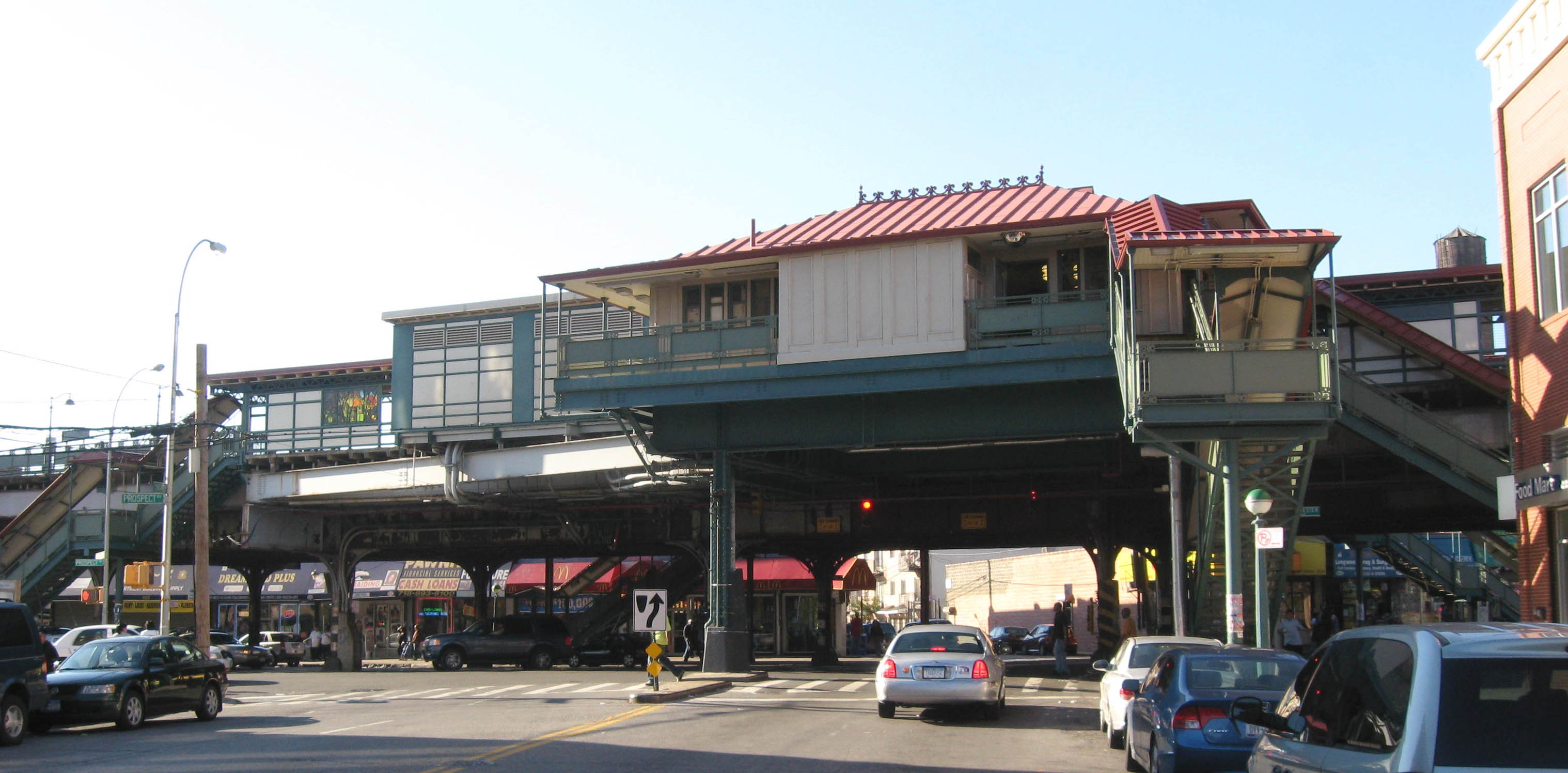
Northbound station house

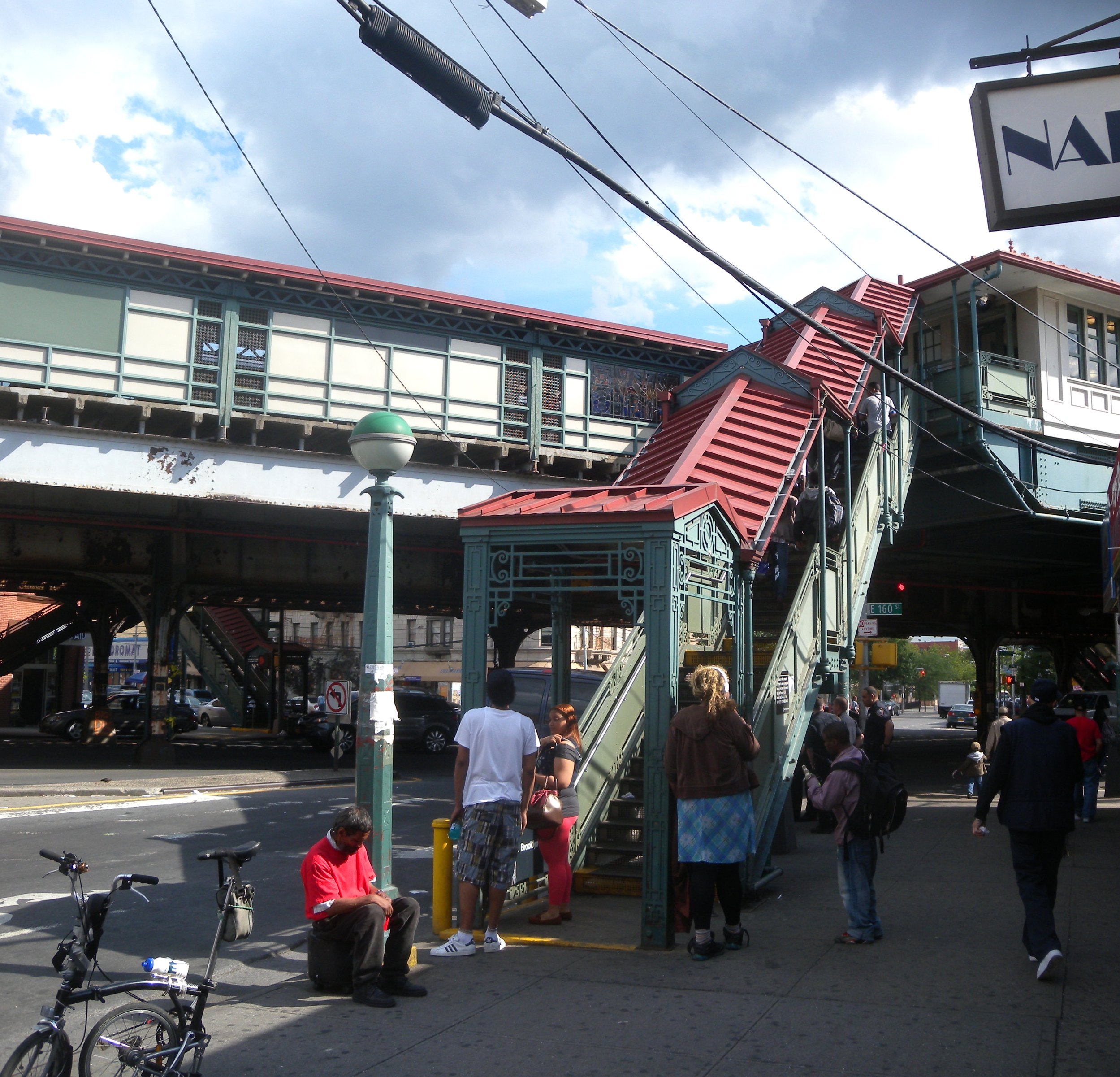
Western stair

The station has three tracks and two side platforms. The center express track is used by the 5 train during rush hours in the peak direction.

The center of both platforms have beige windscreens with green frames, red canopies, and green support columns. The ends have waist high, green steel fences with lampposts at regular intervals. The station signs are in the standard black station name plate with white lettering.

As with other original IRT elevated viaducts, the elevated structure at Prospect Avenue is carried on two column bents, one on each side of the road, at places where the tracks are no more than 29 feet (8.8 m) above the ground level. There is zigzag lateral bracing at intervals of every four panels.

The 2006 artwork here is called Bronx, Four Seasons by Ukrainian artist Marina Tsersarskaya. It consists of stained glass panels on the platform windscreens and station houses depicting images related the four seasons of meteorology.

=== Exits ===
This station is very close to street level. As a result, the stations houses are adjacent to their respective platforms and there are no crossovers or crossunders.

On the Manhattan-bound side, one staircase from the northwest corner of Westchester Avenue and 160th Street goes up to the north side of the station house. Another from the northern intersection of Prospect Avenue and 160th Street goes up to the south side. Inside the station house, there is a token booth, turnstile bank, waiting area, and doors leading to the platform. The platform has two exit-only turnstiles, each of which leads to one of the street stairs.

On the northbound side, two staircases from the northeast corner of Longwood and Westchester Avenues go up to the north side of the station house, which has a now closed customer assistance booth, turnstile bank, waiting area, and doors leading directly to the platform. A high exit-only turnstile from the platform leads directly to the staircases. Towards the south end of the platform, another exit-only turnstile leads to a double-flight staircase going down to the northeast corner of Prospect and Westchester Avenue. Both station houses have heaters.
