= List of New York City Subway stations =

List of all active stations in the New York City Subway

A current New York City Transit Authority rail system map (unofficial)

The New York City Subway is a rapid transit system that serves four of the five boroughs of New York City in the U.S. state of New York: the Bronx, Brooklyn, Manhattan, and Queens. Operated by the New York City Transit Authority under the Metropolitan Transportation Authority of New York, the New York City Subway is the busiest rapid transit system in the United States and among the 20 busiest in the world, with an average 4.002 million riders on weekdays in 2025.

Three rapid transit companies merged in 1940 to create the present New York City Subway system: the Interborough Rapid Transit Company (IRT), the Brooklyn–Manhattan Transit Corporation (BMT), and the Independent Subway System (IND).

== Lists of stations by borough ==
The four lists of New York City Subway stations by borough have additional details regarding services, accessibility, and transfers.

- List of New York City Subway stations in the Bronx
- List of New York City Subway stations in Brooklyn
- List of New York City Subway stations in Manhattan
- List of New York City Subway stations in Queens

== List of stations ==
New York City Subway services and the number of stations served; station-counts in bold represent the regular daytime services in the station table
Time of day	"1" train	"2" train	"3" train	"4" train	"5" train	"6" train	"6" express train	"7" train	"7" express train	(42nd St.)	"A" train	"B" train	"C" train	"D" train	"E" train	"F" train	"F" express train	"G" train	"J" train	"Z" train	"L" train	"M" train	"N" train	"Q" train	"R" train	"W" train	(Fkln. Ave.)	(Rock. Park)
Rush hours	**38**	52	**34**	**28**	33	**38**	29	**22**	12	**2**	44	37	**40**	29	24	**45**	39	**21**	20	21	**24**	**36**	39	**29**	**45**	**23**	**4**	**5**
Middays	**38**	**49**	**34**	**28**	**36**	**38**		**22**		**2**	**40**	**27**	**40**	**35**	**22**	**45**		**21**	**30**		**24**	**36**	**28**	**29**	**45**	**23**	**4**	**5**
Evenings	**38**	**49**	**34**	**28**	**36**	**38**		**22**		**2**	**40**	**27**	**40**	**35**	24	**45**		**21**	**30**		**24**	13	**28**	**29**	**45**	**23**	**4**	**5**
Weekends	**38**	**49**	**34**	**28**	25	**38**		**22**		**2**	**40**		**40**	**35**	24	**45**		**21**	**30**		**24**	13	32	**29**	**45**		**4**	**5**
Late nights	**38**	61	9	54	6	**38**		**22**			62			40	32	55		**21**	**30**		**24**	8	45	34	17		**4**	**5**
Limited				12	53				8		8													22	34	44		9

Permanently closed subway stations, including those that have been demolished, are not included in the list below.

†	Terminal of a regular/daytime service

Station	Services	Div	Line	Opened	Borough	Neighborhood	Ridership (2025)	Rank
First Avenue	"L" train	BMT	Canarsie Line	June 30, 1924	Manhattan	East Village	7,301,507	30
Second Avenue	"F" train	IND	Sixth Avenue Line	January 1, 1936	Manhattan	East Village	4,548,544	67
Third Avenue	"L" train	BMT	Canarsie Line	June 30, 1924	Manhattan	East Village	1,884,103	185
Third Avenue–138th Street	"6" train	IRT	Pelham Line	August 1, 1918	The Bronx	Mott Haven	1,802,356	199
Third Avenue–149th Street	"2" train "5" train	IRT	White Plains Road Line	July 10, 1905	The Bronx	Mott Haven	4,261,404	79
Fourth Avenue/Ninth Street	"R" train	BMT	Fourth Avenue Line	June 22, 1915	Brooklyn	Park Slope	3,120,872	120
Fourth Avenue/Ninth Street	"F" train "G" train	IND	Culver Line	October 7, 1933	Brooklyn	Park Slope	3,120,872	120
Fifth Avenue/53rd Street	"E" train "F" train	IND	Queens Boulevard Line	November 1, 1933	Manhattan	Midtown	4,173,272	82
Fifth Avenue–59th Street	"N" train "R" train "W" train	BMT	Broadway Line	September 1, 1919	Manhattan	Midtown	3,853,515	91
Seventh Avenue	"B" train "D" train "E" train	IND	Sixth Avenue Line, Queens Boulevard Line	August 19, 1933	Manhattan	Midtown	4,486,760	70
Seventh Avenue	"B" train "Q" train	BMT	Brighton Line	August 1, 1920	Brooklyn	Park Slope	2,316,373	158
Seventh Avenue	"F" train "G" train	IND	Culver Line	October 7, 1933	Brooklyn	Park Slope	2,977,239	127
Eighth Avenue	"N" train	BMT	Sea Beach Line	June 22, 1915	Brooklyn	Sunset Park	2,935,590	131
Eighth Street–New York University	"R" train "W" train	BMT	Broadway Line	September 4, 1917	Manhattan	Greenwich Village	4,297,327	77
Ninth Avenue	"D" train	BMT	West End Line	June 24, 1916	Brooklyn	Sunset Park	1,397,190	241
14th Street/Sixth Avenue	"F" train "M" train	IND	Sixth Avenue Line	December 15, 1940	Manhattan	Chelsea	11,357,788	18
14th Street/Sixth Avenue	"1" train "2" train "3" train	IRT	Broadway–Seventh Avenue Line	July 1, 1918	Manhattan	Chelsea	11,357,788	18
14th Street/Sixth Avenue	"L" train	BMT	Canarsie Line	June 30, 1924	Manhattan	Chelsea	11,357,788	18
14th Street/Eighth Avenue†	"A" train "C" train "E" train	IND	Eighth Avenue Line	September 10, 1932	Manhattan	Chelsea	12,021,140	16
14th Street/Eighth Avenue†	"L" train	BMT	Canarsie Line	May 30, 1931	Manhattan	Chelsea	12,021,140	16
14th Street–Union Square	"N" train "Q" train "R" train "W" train	BMT	Broadway Line	September 4, 1917	Manhattan	Union Square	24,316,583	4
14th Street–Union Square	"L" train	BMT	Canarsie Line	June 30, 1924	Manhattan	Union Square	24,316,583	4
14th Street–Union Square	"4" train "5" train "6" train	IRT	Lexington Avenue Line	October 27, 1904	Manhattan	Union Square	24,316,583	4
15th Street–Prospect Park	"F" train "G" train	IND	Culver Line	October 7, 1933	Brooklyn	Windsor Terrace	1,460,232	233
18th Avenue	"F" train	IND	Culver Line	March 16, 1919	Brooklyn	Borough Park	788,976	343
18th Avenue	"N" train	BMT	Sea Beach Line	June 22, 1915	Brooklyn	Bensonhurst	1,241,122	271
18th Avenue	"D" train	BMT	West End Line	June 24, 1916	Brooklyn	Bensonhurst	1,434,357	235
18th Street	"1" train	IRT	Broadway–Seventh Avenue Line	July 1, 1918	Manhattan	Chelsea	1,846,605	191
20th Avenue	"N" train	BMT	Sea Beach Line	June 22, 1915	Brooklyn	Bensonhurst	1,042,118	302
20th Avenue	"D" train	BMT	West End Line	July 29, 1916	Brooklyn	Bensonhurst	1,194,033	279
21st Street	"G" train	IND	Crosstown Line	August 19, 1933	Queens	Long Island City	488,072	398
21st Street–Queensbridge	"M" train	IND	63rd Street Line	October 29, 1989	Queens	Long Island City	2,815,320	135
23rd Street	"F" train "M" train	IND	Sixth Avenue Line	December 15, 1940	Manhattan	Chelsea	6,335,334	41
23rd Street	"C" train "E" train	IND	Eighth Avenue Line	September 10, 1932	Manhattan	Chelsea	5,098,705	59
23rd Street	"R" train "W" train	BMT	Broadway Line	January 5, 1918	Manhattan	Flatiron District	4,815,798	61
23rd Street	"1" train	IRT	Broadway–Seventh Avenue Line	July 1, 1918	Manhattan	Chelsea	3,413,261	109
23rd Street–Baruch College	"6" train	IRT	Lexington Avenue Line	October 27, 1904	Manhattan	Gramercy	6,031,370	47
25th Avenue	"D" train	BMT	West End Line	July 29, 1916	Brooklyn	Bensonhurst	943,973	321
25th Street	"R" train	BMT	Fourth Avenue Line	June 22, 1915	Brooklyn	Greenwood Heights	902,467	330
28th Street	"R" train "W" train	BMT	Broadway Line	January 5, 1918	Manhattan	Midtown	3,260,095	116
28th Street	"1" train	IRT	Broadway–Seventh Avenue Line	July 1, 1918	Manhattan	Chelsea	3,301,327	113
28th Street	"6" train	IRT	Lexington Avenue Line	October 27, 1904	Manhattan	Rose Hill	4,767,390	63
30th Avenue	"N" train "W" train	BMT	Astoria Line	February 1, 1917	Queens	Astoria	3,355,303	110
33rd Street	"6" train	IRT	Lexington Avenue Line	October 27, 1904	Manhattan	Murray Hill	6,421,732	38
33rd Street–Rawson Street	"7" train	IRT	Flushing Line	April 21, 1917	Queens	Sunnyside	2,218,915	164
34th Street–Herald Square	"B" train "D" train "F" train "M" train	IND	Sixth Avenue Line	December 15, 1940	Manhattan	Midtown	26,328,230	3
34th Street–Herald Square	"N" train "Q" train "R" train "W" train	BMT	Broadway Line	January 5, 1918	Manhattan	Midtown	26,328,230	3
34th Street–Hudson Yards†	"7" train	IRT	Flushing Line	September 13, 2015	Manhattan	Hell's Kitchen	6,674,673	34
34th Street–Penn Station	"A" train "C" train "E" train	IND	Eighth Avenue Line	September 10, 1932	Manhattan	Midtown	19,915,971	6
34th Street–Penn Station	"1" train "2" train "3" train	IRT	Broadway–Seventh Avenue Line	June 3, 1917	Manhattan	Midtown	17,808,404	7
36th Avenue	"N" train "W" train	BMT	Astoria Line	February 1, 1917	Queens	Astoria	1,621,263	216
36th Street	"D" train "N" train "R" train	BMT	Fourth Avenue Line	June 22, 1915	Brooklyn	Sunset Park	3,894,072	89
36th Street	"M" train "R" train	IND	Queens Boulevard Line	August 19, 1933	Queens	Long Island City	832,981	337
39th Avenue	"N" train "W" train	BMT	Astoria Line	February 1, 1917	Queens	Long Island City	943,246	322
40th Street–Lowery Street	"7" train	IRT	Flushing Line	April 21, 1917	Queens	Sunnyside	2,461,146	152
42nd Street–Bryant Park/Fifth Avenue	"B" train "D" train "F" train "M" train	IND	Sixth Avenue Line	December 15, 1940	Manhattan	Midtown	61,203,303 (Note: Ridership data includes Times Square–42nd Street station, 42nd Street–Port Authority Bus Terminal station, and 42nd Street–Bryant Park/Fifth Avenue station)	1
42nd Street–Bryant Park/Fifth Avenue	"7" train	IRT	Flushing Line	March 22, 1926	Manhattan	Midtown	61,203,303	1
42nd Street–Port Authority Bus Terminal	"A" train "C" train "E" train	IND	Eighth Avenue Line	September 10, 1932	Manhattan	Midtown	61,203,303	1
45th Street	"R" train	BMT	Fourth Avenue Line	September 22, 1915	Brooklyn	Sunset Park	1,998,599	178
46th Street	"M" train "R" train	IND	Queens Boulevard Line	August 19, 1933	Queens	Astoria	1,900,184	184
46th Street–Bliss Street	"7" train	IRT	Flushing Line	April 21, 1917	Queens	Sunnyside	3,435,102	107
47th–50th Streets–Rockefeller Center	"B" train "D" train "F" train "M" train	IND	Sixth Avenue Line	December 15, 1940	Manhattan	Midtown	13,526,667	12
49th Street	"N" train "R" train "W" train	BMT	Broadway Line	July 10, 1919	Manhattan	Midtown	7,386,624	29
50th Street	"C" train "E" train	IND	Eighth Avenue Line, Queens Boulevard Line	September 10, 1932	Manhattan	Midtown	5,823,868	49
50th Street	"1" train	IRT	Broadway–Seventh Avenue Line	October 27, 1904	Manhattan	Midtown	6,486,476	37
50th Street	"D" train	BMT	West End Line	June 24, 1916	Brooklyn	Borough Park	779,016	345
52nd Street	"7" train	IRT	Flushing Line	April 21, 1917	Queens	Woodside	1,242,756	269
53rd Street	"R" train	BMT	Fourth Avenue Line	September 22, 1915	Brooklyn	Sunset Park	2,189,557	168
55th Street	"D" train	BMT	West End Line	June 24, 1916	Brooklyn	Borough Park	423,819	402
57th Street	"M" train	IND	Sixth Avenue Line	July 1, 1968	Manhattan	Midtown	3,816,096	94
57th Street–Seventh Avenue	"N" train "Q" train "R" train "W" train	BMT	Broadway Line	July 10, 1919	Manhattan	Midtown	8,709,553	24
59th Street	"N" train "R" train	BMT	Fourth Avenue Line	June 22, 1915	Brooklyn	Sunset Park	3,269,987	115
59th Street–Columbus Circle	"A" train "B" train "C" train "D" train	IND	Eighth Avenue Line	September 10, 1932	Manhattan	Midtown	17,215,905	8
59th Street–Columbus Circle	"1" train	IRT	Broadway–Seventh Avenue Line	October 27, 1904	Manhattan	Midtown	17,215,905	8
61st Street–Woodside	"7" train	IRT	Flushing Line	April 21, 1917	Queens	Woodside	3,808,140	83
62nd Street/New Utrecht Avenue	"N" train	BMT	Sea Beach Line	June 22, 1915	Brooklyn	Borough Park	1,200,551	278
62nd Street/New Utrecht Avenue	"D" train	BMT	West End Line	June 24, 1916	Brooklyn	Borough Park	1,200,551	278
63rd Drive–Rego Park	"M" train "R" train	IND	Queens Boulevard Line	December 31, 1936	Queens	Rego Park	3,216,674	119
65th Street	"M" train "R" train	IND	Queens Boulevard Line	August 19, 1933	Queens	Woodside	873,931	332
66th Street–Lincoln Center	"1" train	IRT	Broadway–Seventh Avenue Line	October 27, 1904	Manhattan	Upper West Side	5,088,311	60
67th Avenue	"M" train "R" train	IND	Queens Boulevard Line	December 31, 1936	Queens	Forest Hills	1,828,980	193
68th Street–Hunter College	"6" train	IRT	Lexington Avenue Line	July 17, 1918	Manhattan	Upper East Side	5,373,920	54
69th Street	"7" train	IRT	Flushing Line	April 21, 1917	Queens	Woodside	1,151,205	286
71st Street	"D" train	BMT	West End Line	June 24, 1916	Brooklyn	Bensonhurst	1,157,268	284
72nd Street	"Q" train	IND	Second Avenue Line	January 1, 2017	Manhattan	Upper East Side	7,583,622	28
72nd Street	"B" train "C" train	IND	Eighth Avenue Line	September 10, 1932	Manhattan	Upper West Side	2,665,805	143
72nd Street	"1" train "2" train "3" train	IRT	Broadway–Seventh Avenue Line	October 27, 1904	Manhattan	Upper West Side	10,091,296	22
75th Avenue	"E" train "F" train	IND	Queens Boulevard Line	December 31, 1936	Queens	Forest Hills	765,491	347
75th Street–Elderts Lane	"J" train	BMT	Jamaica Line	May 28, 1917	Queens	Woodhaven	849,330	335
77th Street	"R" train	BMT	Fourth Avenue Line	January 15, 1916	Brooklyn	Bay Ridge	1,287,849	262
77th Street	"6" train	IRT	Lexington Avenue Line	July 17, 1918	Manhattan	Upper East Side	6,594,725	35
79th Street	"1" train	IRT	Broadway–Seventh Avenue Line	October 27, 1904	Manhattan	Upper West Side	3,842,333	92
79th Street	"D" train	BMT	West End Line	June 24, 1916	Brooklyn	Bensonhurst	1,497,353	228
80th Street	"A" train	IND	Fulton Street Line	September 25, 1915	Queens	Ozone Park	954,592	320
81st Street–Museum of Natural History	"B" train "C" train	IND	Eighth Avenue Line	September 10, 1932	Manhattan	Upper West Side	3,503,727	103
82nd Street–Jackson Heights	"7" train	IRT	Flushing Line	April 21, 1917	Queens	Jackson Heights	3,648,388	98
85th Street–Forest Parkway	"J" train	BMT	Jamaica Line	May 28, 1917	Queens	Woodhaven	565,866	382
86th Street	"Q" train	IND	Second Avenue Line	January 1, 2017	Manhattan	Upper East Side	6,391,777	39
86th Street	"R" train	BMT	Fourth Avenue Line	January 15, 1916	Brooklyn	Bay Ridge	2,738,880	140
86th Street	"B" train "C" train	IND	Eighth Avenue Line	September 10, 1932	Manhattan	Upper West Side	2,693,156	142
86th Street	"1" train	IRT	Broadway–Seventh Avenue Line	October 27, 1904	Manhattan	Upper West Side	4,377,930	75
86th Street	"4" train "5" train "6" train	IRT	Lexington Avenue Line	July 17, 1918	Manhattan	Upper East Side	11,202,266	19
86th Street	"N" train	BMT	Sea Beach Line	June 22, 1915	Brooklyn	Gravesend	568,153	380
88th Street	"A" train	IND	Fulton Street Line	September 25, 1915	Queens	Ozone Park	616,069	368
90th Street–Elmhurst Avenue	"7" train	IRT	Flushing Line	April 21, 1917	Queens	Elmhurst	4,712,110	64
96th Street†	"Q" train	IND	Second Avenue Line	January 1, 2017	Manhattan	Upper East Side	4,421,857	73
96th Street	"B" train "C" train	IND	Eighth Avenue Line	September 10, 1932	Manhattan	Upper West Side	2,274,987	159
96th Street	"1" train "2" train "3" train	IRT	Broadway–Seventh Avenue Line	October 27, 1904	Manhattan	Upper West Side	8,700,833	25
96th Street	"6" train	IRT	Lexington Avenue Line	July 17, 1918	Manhattan	East Harlem	3,981,476	86
103rd Street	"B" train "C" train	IND	Eighth Avenue Line	September 10, 1932	Manhattan	Upper West Side	1,115,360	290
103rd Street	"1" train	IRT	Broadway–Seventh Avenue Line	October 27, 1904	Manhattan	Upper West Side	2,987,967	126
103rd Street	"6" train	IRT	Lexington Avenue Line	July 17, 1918	Manhattan	East Harlem	2,898,300	133
103rd Street–Corona Plaza	"7" train	IRT	Flushing Line	April 21, 1917	Queens	Corona	5,595,189	51
104th Street	"A" train	IND	Fulton Street Line	September 25, 1915	Queens	Ozone Park	383,569	407
104th Street	"J" train	BMT	Jamaica Line	May 28, 1917	Queens	Richmond Hill	600,040	372
110th Street	"6" train	IRT	Lexington Avenue Line	July 17, 1918	Manhattan	East Harlem	2,414,168	154
111th Street	"7" train	IRT	Flushing Line	October 13, 1925	Queens	Corona	3,465,726	106
111th Street	"A" train	IND	Fulton Street Line	September 25, 1915	Queens	Richmond Hill	456,802	399
111th Street	"J" train	BMT	Jamaica Line	May 28, 1917	Queens	Richmond Hill	521,227	391
116th Street	"B" train "C" train	IND	Eighth Avenue Line	September 10, 1932	Manhattan	Harlem	1,517,442	227
116th Street	"2" train "3" train	IRT	Lenox Avenue Line	November 23, 1904	Manhattan	Harlem	2,248,189	161
116th Street	"6" train	IRT	Lexington Avenue Line	July 17, 1918	Manhattan	East Harlem	3,116,317	121
116th Street–Columbia University	"1" train	IRT	Broadway–Seventh Avenue Line	October 27, 1904	Manhattan	Morningside Heights	3,435,034	108
121st Street	"J" train	BMT	Jamaica Line	July 3, 1918	Queens	Richmond Hill	524,477	390
125th Street	"A" train "B" train "C" train "D" train	IND	Eighth Avenue Line	September 10, 1932	Manhattan	Harlem	6,171,780	45
125th Street	"1" train	IRT	Broadway–Seventh Avenue Line	October 27, 1904	Manhattan	Manhattanville	2,089,879	175
125th Street	"2" train "3" train	IRT	Lenox Avenue Line	November 23, 1904	Manhattan	Harlem	3,311,228	112
125th Street	"4" train "5" train "6" train	IRT	Lexington Avenue Line	July 17, 1918	Manhattan	East Harlem	5,788,214	50
135th Street	"B" train "C" train	IND	Eighth Avenue Line	September 10, 1932	Manhattan	Harlem	1,212,560	273
135th Street	"2" train "3" train	IRT	Lenox Avenue Line	November 23, 1904	Manhattan	Harlem	2,647,493	144
137th Street–City College	"1" train	IRT	Broadway–Seventh Avenue Line	October 27, 1904	Manhattan	Hamilton Heights	2,561,284	141
138th Street–Grand Concourse	"4" train "5" train	IRT	Jerome Avenue Line	July 17, 1918	The Bronx	Mott Haven	938,201	323
145th Street†	"A" train "B" train "C" train "D" train	IND	Eighth Avenue Line, Concourse Line	September 10, 1932	Manhattan	Harlem	5,146,201	58
145th Street	"1" train	IRT	Broadway–Seventh Avenue Line	October 27, 1904	Manhattan	Hamilton Heights	2,168,938	170
145th Street	"3" train	IRT	Lenox Avenue Line	November 23, 1904	Manhattan	Harlem	652,382	363
149th Street–Hostos	"4" train	IRT	Jerome Avenue Line	June 2, 1917	The Bronx	Mott Haven	2,533,664	148
149th Street–Hostos	"2" train "5" train	IRT	White Plains Road Line	July 10, 1905	The Bronx	Mott Haven	2,533,664	148
155th Street	"C" train	IND	Eighth Avenue Line	September 10, 1932	Manhattan	Washington Heights	573,627	377
155th Street	"D" train	IND	Concourse Line	July 1, 1933	Manhattan	Harlem	597,116	373
157th Street	"1" train	IRT	Broadway–Seventh Avenue Line	November 12, 1904	Manhattan	Washington Heights	2,401,979	155
161st Street–Yankee Stadium	"D" train	IND	Concourse Line	July 1, 1933	The Bronx	Highbridge	6,186,747	43
161st Street–Yankee Stadium	"4" train	IRT	Jerome Avenue Line	June 2, 1917	The Bronx	Highbridge	6,186,747	43
163rd Street–Amsterdam Avenue	"C" train	IND	Eighth Avenue Line	September 10, 1932	Manhattan	Washington Heights	930,777	326
167th Street	"D" train	IND	Concourse Line	July 1, 1933	The Bronx	Highbridge	1,710,945	208
167th Street	"4" train	IRT	Jerome Avenue Line	June 2, 1917	The Bronx	Highbridge	1,943,962	183
168th Street†	"A" train "C" train	IND	Eighth Avenue Line	September 10, 1932	Manhattan	Washington Heights	5,339,804	55
168th Street†	"1" train	IRT	Broadway–Seventh Avenue Line	April 14, 1906	Manhattan	Washington Heights	5,339,804	55
169th Street	"F" train	IND	Queens Boulevard Line	April 24, 1937	Queens	Jamaica	1,761,114	202
170th Street	"D" train	IND	Concourse Line	July 1, 1933	The Bronx	Highbridge	1,179,192	281
170th Street	"4" train	IRT	Jerome Avenue Line	June 2, 1917	The Bronx	Highbridge	1,603,276	220
174th Street	"2" train "5" train	IRT	White Plains Road Line	November 26, 1904	The Bronx	Crotona Park East	1,328,081	253
174th–175th Streets	"D" train	IND	Concourse Line	July 1, 1933	The Bronx	Tremont	935,790	324
175th Street	"A" train	IND	Eighth Avenue Line	September 10, 1932	Manhattan	Washington Heights	2,324,751	157
176th Street	"4" train	IRT	Jerome Avenue Line	June 2, 1917	The Bronx	Morris Heights	1,208,068	275
181st Street	"A" train	IND	Eighth Avenue Line	September 10, 1932	Manhattan	Washington Heights	2,185,502	169
181st Street	"1" train	IRT	Broadway–Seventh Avenue Line	May 30, 1906	Manhattan	Washington Heights	2,466,470	150
182nd–183rd Streets	"D" train	IND	Concourse Line	July 1, 1933	The Bronx	Fordham	967,479	316
183rd Street	"4" train	IRT	Jerome Avenue Line	June 2, 1917	The Bronx	University Heights	1,179,964	280
190th Street	"A" train	IND	Eighth Avenue Line	September 10, 1932	Manhattan	Washington Heights	965,088	317
191st Street	"1" train	IRT	Broadway–Seventh Avenue Line	January 14, 1911	Manhattan	Washington Heights	1,731,755	205
207th Street	"1" train	IRT	Broadway–Seventh Avenue Line	April 1, 1907	Manhattan	Inwood	1,346,653	249
215th Street	"1" train	IRT	Broadway–Seventh Avenue Line	March 12, 1906	Manhattan	Inwood	508,066	393
219th Street	"2" train	IRT	White Plains Road Line	March 3, 1917	The Bronx	Williamsbridge	546,684	387
225th Street	"2" train	IRT	White Plains Road Line	March 31, 1917	The Bronx	Williamsbridge	630,098	367
231st Street	"1" train	IRT	Broadway–Seventh Avenue Line	January 27, 1907	The Bronx	Kingsbridge	1,964,559	181
233rd Street	"2" train	IRT	White Plains Road Line	March 31, 1917	The Bronx	Wakefield	788,978	342
238th Street	"1" train	IRT	Broadway–Seventh Avenue Line	August 1, 1908	The Bronx	Kingsbridge	1,023,369	305
Alabama Avenue	"J" train	BMT	Jamaica Line	September 5, 1885	Brooklyn	East New York	433,043	400
Allerton Avenue	"2" train	IRT	White Plains Road Line	March 3, 1917	The Bronx	Allerton	881,364	331
Aqueduct Racetrack	"A" train	IND	Rockaway Line	September 14, 1959	Queens	Ozone Park	168,011	415
Aqueduct–North Conduit Avenue	"A" train	IND	Rockaway Line	June 28, 1956	Queens	Ozone Park	176,916	414
Astor Place	"6" train	IRT	Lexington Avenue Line	October 27, 1904	Manhattan	East Village	4,083,343	84
Astoria Boulevard	"N" train "W" train	BMT	Astoria Line	February 1, 1917	Queens	Astoria	2,603,893	146
Astoria–Ditmars Boulevard†	"N" train "W" train	BMT	Astoria Line	February 1, 1917	Queens	Astoria	3,510,873	101
Atlantic Avenue	"L" train	BMT	Canarsie Line	July 4, 1889	Brooklyn	East New York	568,073	381
Atlantic Avenue–Barclays Center	"D" train "N" train "R" train	BMT	Fourth Avenue Line	June 22, 1915	Brooklyn	Downtown	10,773,513	20
Atlantic Avenue–Barclays Center	"B" train "Q" train	BMT	Brighton Line	August 1, 1920	Brooklyn	Downtown	10,773,513	20
Atlantic Avenue–Barclays Center	"2" train "3" train "4" train "5" train	IRT	Eastern Parkway Line	May 1, 1908	Brooklyn	Downtown	10,773,513	20
Avenue H	"Q" train	BMT	Brighton Line	August 23, 1907	Brooklyn	Midwood	735,466	351
Avenue I	"F" train	IND	Culver Line	March 16, 1919	Brooklyn	Midwood	341,541	408
Avenue J	"Q" train	BMT	Brighton Line	August 23, 1907	Brooklyn	Midwood	1,243,856	268
Avenue M	"Q" train	BMT	Brighton Line	August 23, 1907	Brooklyn	Midwood	1,317,615	257
Avenue N	"F" train	IND	Culver Line	March 16, 1919	Brooklyn	Bensonhurst	588,204	374
Avenue P	"F" train	IND	Culver Line	March 16, 1919	Brooklyn	Midwood	559,221	383
Avenue U	"Q" train	BMT	Brighton Line	August 23, 1907	Brooklyn	Homecrest	1,570,158	224
Avenue U	"F" train	IND	Culver Line	May 10, 1919	Brooklyn	Gravesend	428,327	401
Avenue U	"N" train	BMT	Sea Beach Line	June 22, 1915	Brooklyn	Gravesend	933,089	325
Avenue X	"F" train	IND	Culver Line	May 10, 1919	Brooklyn	Gravesend	520,692	392
Bay 50th Street	"D" train	BMT	West End Line	July 21, 1917	Brooklyn	Gravesend	646,894	364
Bay Parkway	"F" train	IND	Culver Line	March 16, 1919	Brooklyn	Midwood	239,898	411
Bay Parkway	"N" train	BMT	Sea Beach Line	June 22, 1915	Brooklyn	Bensonhurst	1,624,915	215
Bay Parkway	"D" train	BMT	West End Line	July 29, 1916	Brooklyn	Bensonhurst	1,716,214	207
Bay Ridge Avenue	"R" train	BMT	Fourth Avenue Line	January 15, 1916	Brooklyn	Bay Ridge	1,855,721	190
Bay Ridge–95th Street†	"R" train	BMT	Fourth Avenue Line	October 31, 1925	Brooklyn	Fort Hamilton	1,242,319	270
Baychester Avenue	"5" train	IRT	Dyre Avenue Line	May 15, 1941	The Bronx	Eastchester	545,919	388
Beach 25th Street	"A" train	IND	Rockaway Line	June 28, 1956	Queens	Bayswater	193,903	413
Beach 36th Street	"A" train	IND	Rockaway Line	June 28, 1956	Queens	Edgemere	102,876	419
Beach 44th Street	"A" train	IND	Rockaway Line	June 28, 1956	Queens	Edgemere	92,973	420
Beach 60th Street	"A" train	IND	Rockaway Line	June 28, 1956	Queens	Arverne	227,333	412
Beach 67th Street	"A" train	IND	Rockaway Line	June 28, 1956	Queens	Arverne	334,601	409
Beach 90th Street	(Note: Rockaway Park Shuttle)	IND	Rockaway Line	June 28, 1956	Queens	Rockaway Beach	141,799	417
Beach 98th Street	shuttle train	IND	Rockaway Line	June 28, 1956	Queens	Rockaway Beach	76,823	421
Beach 105th Street	shuttle train	IND	Rockaway Line	June 28, 1956	Queens	Rockaway Park	55,818	422
Bedford Avenue	"L" train	BMT	Canarsie Line	June 30, 1924	Brooklyn	Williamsburg	9,815,095	23
Bedford Park Boulevard	"D" train	IND	Concourse Line	July 1, 1933	The Bronx	Bedford Park	1,324,631	255
Bedford Park Boulevard–Lehman College	"4" train	IRT	Jerome Avenue Line	April 15, 1918	The Bronx	Bedford Park	1,094,935	293
Bedford–Nostrand Avenues	"G" train	IND	Crosstown Line	July 1, 1937	Brooklyn	Bedford–Stuyvesant	2,213,779	167
Bergen Street	"F" train "G" train	IND	Culver Line	March 20, 1933	Brooklyn	Boerum Hill	2,938,443	130
Bergen Street	"2" train "3" train	IRT	Eastern Parkway Line	October 10, 1920	Brooklyn	Park Slope	1,108,981	291
Beverley Road	"Q" train	BMT	Brighton Line	August 23, 1907	Brooklyn	Flatbush	961,457	318
Beverly Road	"2" train "5" train	IRT	Nostrand Avenue Line	August 23, 1920	Brooklyn	East Flatbush	1,056,211	300
Borough Hall/Court Street	"R" train	BMT	Fourth Avenue Line	August 1, 1920	Brooklyn	Downtown	6,261,766	42
Borough Hall/Court Street	"2" train "3" train	IRT	Broadway–Seventh Avenue Line	April 15, 1919	Brooklyn	Downtown	6,261,766	42
Borough Hall/Court Street	"4" train "5" train	IRT	Eastern Parkway Line	January 9, 1908	Brooklyn	Downtown	6,261,766	42
Bowery	"J" train	BMT	Nassau Street Line	August 4, 1913	Manhattan	Lower East Side	1,005,874	310
Bowling Green	"4" train "5" train	IRT	Lexington Avenue Line	July 10, 1905	Manhattan	Financial District	4,784,249	62
Briarwood	"E" train "F" train	IND	Queens Boulevard Line	April 24, 1937	Queens	Briarwood	1,147,126	287
Brighton Beach†	"B" train "Q" train	BMT	Brighton Line	August 23, 1907	Brooklyn	Brighton Beach	2,480,745	149
Broad Channel†	"A" train shuttle train	IND	Rockaway Line	June 28, 1956	Queens	Broad Channel	38,720	423
Broad Street†	"J" train	BMT	Nassau Street Line	May 29, 1931	Manhattan	Financial District	1,399,459	240
Broadway	"N" train "W" train	BMT	Astoria Line	February 1, 1917	Queens	Astoria	3,012,199	124
Broadway	"G" train	IND	Crosstown Line	July 1, 1937	Brooklyn	Williamsburg	1,177,914	282
Broadway Junction	"L" train	BMT	Canarsie Line	July 14, 1928	Brooklyn	East New York	1,836,336	192
Broadway Junction	"A" train "C" train	IND	Fulton Street Line	December 30, 1946	Brooklyn	East New York	1,836,336	192
Broadway Junction	"J" train	BMT	Jamaica Line	August 5, 1919	Brooklyn	East New York	1,836,336	192
Broadway–Lafayette Street/Bleecker Street	"B" train "D" train "F" train "M" train	IND	Sixth Avenue Line	January 1, 1936	Manhattan	Greenwich Village	10,773,380	21
Broadway–Lafayette Street/Bleecker Street	"6" train	IRT	Lexington Avenue Line	October 27, 1904	Manhattan	Greenwich Village	10,773,380	21
Bronx Park East	"2" train	IRT	White Plains Road Line	March 3, 1917	The Bronx	Van Nest	493,995	397
Brook Avenue	"6" train	IRT	Pelham Line	January 7, 1919	The Bronx	Mott Haven	1,090,236	295
Brooklyn Bridge–City Hall/Chambers Street†	"4" train "5" train "6" train	IRT	Lexington Avenue Line	October 27, 1904	Manhattan	Civic Center	6,174,587	44
Brooklyn Bridge–City Hall/Chambers Street†	"J" train	BMT	Nassau Street Line	August 4, 1913	Manhattan	Civic Center	6,174,587	44
Buhre Avenue	"6" train	IRT	Pelham Line	December 20, 1920	The Bronx	Pelham Bay	780,963	344
Burke Avenue	"2" train	IRT	White Plains Road Line	March 3, 1917	The Bronx	Allerton	529,080	389
Burnside Avenue	"4" train	IRT	Jerome Avenue Line	June 2, 1917	The Bronx	Morris Heights	1,954,902	182
Bushwick Avenue–Aberdeen Street	"L" train	BMT	Canarsie Line	July 14, 1928	Brooklyn	Bushwick	603,706	370
Canal Street	"A" train "C" train "E" train	IND	Eighth Avenue Line	September 10, 1932	Manhattan	Tribeca	4,307,784	76
Canal Street	"N" train "Q" train	BMT	Broadway Line	September 4, 1917	Manhattan	Chinatown	12,103,129	14
Canal Street	"R" train "W" train	BMT	Broadway Line	January 5, 1918	Manhattan	Chinatown	12,103,129	14
Canal Street	"6" train	IRT	Lexington Avenue Line	October 27, 1904	Manhattan	Chinatown	12,103,129	14
Canal Street	"J" train	BMT	Nassau Street Line	August 4, 1913	Manhattan	Chinatown	12,103,129	14
Canal Street	"1" train	IRT	Broadway–Seventh Avenue Line	July 1, 1918	Manhattan	SoHo	1,318,662	256
Canarsie–Rockaway Parkway†	"L" train	BMT	Canarsie Line	July 28, 1906	Brooklyn	Canarsie	2,221,658	163
Castle Hill Avenue	"6" train	IRT	Pelham Line	October 24, 1920	The Bronx	Castle Hill	1,279,969	263
Cathedral Parkway–110th Street	"B" train "C" train	IND	Eighth Avenue Line	September 10, 1932	Manhattan	Upper West Side	1,862,765	189
Cathedral Parkway–110th Street	"1" train	IRT	Broadway–Seventh Avenue Line	October 27, 1904	Manhattan	Morningside Heights	3,068,346	122
Carroll Street	"F" train "G" train	IND	Culver Line	October 7, 1933	Brooklyn	Carroll Gardens	3,006,349	125
Central Avenue	"M" train	BMT	Myrtle Avenue Line	July 20, 1889	Brooklyn	Bushwick	913,228	329
Chambers Street	"1" train "2" train "3" train	IRT	Broadway–Seventh Avenue Line	July 1, 1918	Manhattan	Financial District	4,243,386	81
Chambers Street–World Trade Center/Park Place/Cortlandt Street†	"A" train "C" train	IND	Eighth Avenue Line	September 10, 1932	Manhattan	Financial District	13,970,793	11
Chambers Street–World Trade Center/Park Place/Cortlandt Street†	"E" train	IND	Eighth Avenue Line	September 10, 1932	Manhattan	Financial District	13,970,793	11
Chambers Street–World Trade Center/Park Place/Cortlandt Street†	"2" train "3" train	IRT	Broadway–Seventh Avenue Line	July 1, 1918	Manhattan	Financial District	13,970,793	11
Chambers Street–World Trade Center/Park Place/Cortlandt Street†	"R" train "W" train	BMT	Broadway Line	January 5, 1918	Manhattan	Financial District	13,970,793	11
Chauncey Street	"J" train	BMT	Jamaica Line	July 18, 1885	Brooklyn	Bedford–Stuyvesant	686,247	354
Christopher Street–Stonewall	"1" train	IRT	Broadway–Seventh Avenue Line	July 1, 1918	Manhattan	Greenwich Village	3,300,633	114
Church Avenue	"B" train "Q" train	BMT	Brighton Line	August 23, 1907	Brooklyn	Flatbush	2,870,789	134
Church Avenue†	"F" train "G" train	IND	Culver Line	October 7, 1933	Brooklyn	Kensington	2,111,292	172
Church Avenue	"2" train "5" train	IRT	Nostrand Avenue Line	August 23, 1920	Brooklyn	Flatbush	2,165,428	171
City Hall	"R" train "W" train	BMT	Broadway Line	January 5, 1918	Manhattan	Civic Center	1,165,756	283
Clark Street	"2" train "3" train	IRT	Broadway–Seventh Avenue Line	April 15, 1919	Brooklyn	Brooklyn Heights	1,717,516	206
Classon Avenue	"G" train	IND	Crosstown Line	July 1, 1937	Brooklyn	Bedford–Stuyvesant	1,328,361	252
Cleveland Street	"J" train	BMT	Jamaica Line	May 30, 1893	Brooklyn	East New York	507,869	394
Clinton–Washington Avenues	"G" train	IND	Crosstown Line	July 1, 1937	Brooklyn	Clinton Hill	1,411,117	239
Clinton–Washington Avenues	"C" train	IND	Fulton Street Line	April 9, 1936	Brooklyn	Clinton Hill	1,878,634	187
Coney Island–Stillwell Avenue†	"D" train "F" train "N" train "Q" train	BMT Brighton Line, IND Culver Line, BMT Sea Beach Line, BMT West End Line		September 5, 1917	Brooklyn	Coney Island	3,475,833	104
Cortelyou Road	"Q" train	BMT	Brighton Line	August 23, 1907	Brooklyn	Flatbush	1,461,253	232
Court Square†	"G" train	IND	Crosstown Line	August 19, 1933	Queens	Long Island City	6,364,588	40
Court Square†	"7" train	IRT	Flushing Line	November 5, 1916	Queens	Long Island City	6,364,588	40
Court Square†	"E" train "F" train	IND	Queens Boulevard Line	August 28, 1939	Queens	Long Island City	6,364,588	40
Crescent Street	"J" train	BMT	Jamaica Line	May 30, 1893	Brooklyn	East New York	960,044	319
Crown Heights–Utica Avenue†	"3" train "4" train	IRT	Eastern Parkway Line	August 23, 1920	Brooklyn	Crown Heights	5,223,543	56
Cypress Avenue	"6" train	IRT	Pelham Line	January 7, 1919	The Bronx	Mott Haven	602,331	371
Cypress Hills	"J" train	BMT	Jamaica Line	May 30, 1893	Brooklyn	East New York	165,887	416
DeKalb Avenue	"B" train "Q" train "R" train	BMT	Fourth Avenue Line, Brighton Line	June 22, 1915	Brooklyn	Downtown	5,392,856	53
DeKalb Avenue	"L" train	BMT	Canarsie Line	July 14, 1928	Brooklyn	Bushwick	3,245,781	117
Delancey Street/Essex Street	"F" train	IND	Sixth Avenue Line	January 1, 1936	Manhattan	Lower East Side	7,776,499	27
Delancey Street/Essex Street	"J" train "M" train	BMT	Nassau Street Line	September 16, 1908	Manhattan	Lower East Side	7,776,499	27
Ditmas Avenue	"F" train	IND	Culver Line	March 16, 1919	Brooklyn	Kensington	855,860	334
Dyckman Street	"A" train	IND	Eighth Avenue Line	September 10, 1932	Manhattan	Inwood	1,474,525	230
Dyckman Street	"1" train	IRT	Broadway–Seventh Avenue Line	March 12, 1906	Manhattan	Inwood	1,657,235	211
East 105th Street	"L" train	BMT	Canarsie Line	July 28, 1906	Brooklyn	Canarsie	584,526	375
East 143rd Street–St. Mary's Street	"6" train	IRT	Pelham Line	January 7, 1919	The Bronx	Mott Haven	413,656	404
East 149th Street	"6" train	IRT	Pelham Line	January 7, 1919	The Bronx	Longwood	1,007,649	308
East 180th Street	"2" train "5" train	IRT	White Plains Road Line	March 3, 1917	The Bronx	Van Nest	1,811,541	197
East Broadway	"F" train	IND	Sixth Avenue Line	January 1, 1936	Manhattan	Lower East Side	3,823,875	93
Eastchester–Dyre Avenue†	"5" train	IRT	Dyre Avenue Line	May 15, 1941	The Bronx	Eastchester	758,779	348
Eastern Parkway–Brooklyn Museum	"2" train "3" train	IRT	Eastern Parkway Line	October 10, 1920	Brooklyn	Prospect Heights	1,200,631	277
Elder Avenue	"6" train	IRT	Pelham Line	May 30, 1920	The Bronx	Soundview	1,390,347	242
Elmhurst Avenue	"M" train "R" train	IND	Queens Boulevard Line	December 31, 1936	Queens	Elmhurst	3,222,424	118
Euclid Avenue†	"A" train "C" train	IND	Fulton Street Line	November 28, 1948	Brooklyn	East New York	2,108,580	173
Far Rockaway–Mott Avenue†	"A" train	IND	Rockaway Line	January 16, 1958	Queens	Far Rockaway	736,909	350
Flatbush Avenue–Brooklyn College†	"2" train "5" train	IRT	Nostrand Avenue Line	August 23, 1920	Brooklyn	Flatbush	3,940,183	88
Flushing Avenue	"G" train	IND	Crosstown Line	July 1, 1937	Brooklyn	Bedford–Stuyvesant	748,642	349
Flushing Avenue	"J" train "M" train	BMT	Jamaica Line	June 25, 1888	Brooklyn	Bedford–Stuyvesant	1,990,994	180
Flushing–Main Street†	"7" train	IRT	Flushing Line	January 21, 1928	Queens	Flushing	14,807,359	9
Fordham Road	"D" train	IND	Concourse Line	July 1, 1933	The Bronx	Fordham	1,881,811	186
Fordham Road	"4" train	IRT	Jerome Avenue Line	June 2, 1917	The Bronx	University Heights	2,059,607	177
Forest Avenue	"M" train	BMT	Myrtle Avenue Line	February 22, 1915	Queens	Ridgewood	1,037,320	304
Forest Hills–71st Avenue†	"E" train "F" train "M" train "R" train	IND	Queens Boulevard Line	December 31, 1936	Queens	Forest Hills	6,118,632	46
Fort Hamilton Parkway	"F" train "G" train	IND	Culver Line	October 7, 1933	Brooklyn	Windsor Terrace	1,423,886	237
Fort Hamilton Parkway	"N" train	BMT	Sea Beach Line	June 22, 1915	Brooklyn	Borough Park	1,628,660	213
Fort Hamilton Parkway	"D" train	BMT	West End Line	June 24, 1916	Brooklyn	Borough Park	1,013,287	306
Franklin Avenue/Botanic Garden	"2" train "3" train "4" train "5" train	IRT	Eastern Parkway Line	August 23, 1920	Brooklyn	Crown Heights	3,663,237	97
Franklin Avenue/Botanic Garden	(Note: Franklin Avenue Shuttle)	BMT	Franklin Avenue Line	September 30, 1928	Brooklyn	Crown Heights	3,663,237	97
Franklin Avenue†	shuttle train	BMT	Franklin Avenue Line	August 15, 1896	Brooklyn	Bedford–Stuyvesant	1,332,893	251
Franklin Avenue†	"C" train	IND	Fulton Street Line	April 9, 1936	Brooklyn	Bedford–Stuyvesant	1,332,893	251
Franklin Street	"1" train	IRT	Broadway–Seventh Avenue Line	July 1, 1918	Manhattan	Tribeca	1,491,202	229
Freeman Street	"2" train "5" train	IRT	White Plains Road Line	November 26, 1904	The Bronx	Crotona Park East	926,268	328
Fresh Pond Road	"M" train	BMT	Myrtle Avenue Line	February 22, 1915	Queens	Ridgewood	1,306,330	260
Fulton Street	"A" train "C" train	IND	Eighth Avenue Line	February 1, 1933	Manhattan	Financial District	20,471,840	5
Fulton Street	"2" train "3" train	IRT	Broadway–Seventh Avenue Line	July 1, 1918	Manhattan	Financial District	20,471,840	5
Fulton Street	"4" train "5" train	IRT	Lexington Avenue Line	January 16, 1905	Manhattan	Financial District	20,471,840	5
Fulton Street	"J" train	BMT	Nassau Street Line	May 29, 1931	Manhattan	Financial District	20,471,840	5
Fulton Street	"G" train	IND	Crosstown Line	July 1, 1937	Brooklyn	Fort Greene	1,600,215	221
Gates Avenue	"J" train	BMT	Jamaica Line	May 13, 1885	Brooklyn	Bedford–Stuyvesant	1,619,347	217
Graham Avenue	"L" train	BMT	Canarsie Line	June 30, 1924	Brooklyn	Williamsburg	2,462,743	151
Grand Army Plaza	"2" train "3" train	IRT	Eastern Parkway Line	October 10, 1920	Brooklyn	Park Slope	1,754,076	203
Grand Avenue–Newtown	"M" train "R" train	IND	Queens Boulevard Line	December 31, 1936	Queens	Elmhurst	4,502,971	68
Grand Central–42nd Street†	(Note: 42nd Street Shuttle)	IRT	42nd Street Line	October 27, 1904	Manhattan	Midtown	35,764,931	2
Grand Central–42nd Street†	"7" train	IRT	Flushing Line	June 22, 1915	Manhattan	Midtown	35,764,931	2
Grand Central–42nd Street†	"4" train "5" train "6" train	IRT	Lexington Avenue Line	July 17, 1918	Manhattan	Midtown	35,764,931	2
Grand Street	"B" train "D" train	IND	Sixth Avenue Line	November 26, 1967	Manhattan	Chinatown	6,001,384	48
Grand Street	"L" train	BMT	Canarsie Line	June 30, 1924	Brooklyn	Williamsburg	1,682,725	209
Grant Avenue	"A" train	IND	Fulton Street Line	April 29, 1956	Brooklyn	East New York	1,136,716	288
Greenpoint Avenue	"G" train	IND	Crosstown Line	August 19, 1933	Brooklyn	Greenpoint	2,784,330	137
Gun Hill Road	"5" train	IRT	Dyre Avenue Line	May 15, 1941	The Bronx	Baychester	845,218	336
Gun Hill Road	"2" train	IRT	White Plains Road Line	March 3, 1917	The Bronx	Williamsbridge	1,271,969	264
Halsey Street	"L" train	BMT	Canarsie Line	July 14, 1928	Queens	Ridgewood	2,106,839	174
Halsey Street	"J" train	BMT	Jamaica Line	August 19, 1885	Brooklyn	Bedford–Stuyvesant	1,452,198	234
Harlem–148th Street†	"3" train	IRT	Lenox Avenue Line	May 13, 1968	Manhattan	Harlem	665,995	360
Hewes Street	"J" train "M" train	BMT	Jamaica Line	June 25, 1888	Brooklyn	Williamsburg	676,977	357
High Street	"A" train "C" train	IND	Eighth Avenue Line	June 24, 1933	Brooklyn	Brooklyn Heights	2,800,683	136
Houston Street	"1" train	IRT	Broadway–Seventh Avenue Line	July 1, 1918	Manhattan	Greenwich Village	3,577,161	100
Hoyt Street	"2" train "3" train	IRT	Eastern Parkway Line	May 1, 1908	Brooklyn	Downtown	1,825,757	195
Hoyt–Schermerhorn Streets	"A" train "C" train "G" train	IND	Crosstown Line, Fulton Street Line	April 9, 1936	Brooklyn	Downtown	3,037,224	123
Howard Beach–JFK Airport	"A" train	IND	Rockaway Line	June 28, 1956	Queens	Howard Beach	1,541,969	226
Hunters Point Avenue	"7" train	IRT	Flushing Line	February 15, 1916	Queens	Long Island City	1,055,799	301
Hunts Point Avenue	"6" train	IRT	Pelham Line	January 7, 1919	The Bronx	Longwood	2,214,032	166
Intervale Avenue	"2" train "5" train	IRT	White Plains Road Line	April 30, 1910	The Bronx	Longwood	670,044	359
Inwood–207th Street†	"A" train	IND	Eighth Avenue Line	September 10, 1932	Manhattan	Inwood	1,809,153	198
Jackson Avenue	"2" train "5" train	IRT	White Plains Road Line	November 26, 1904	The Bronx	Melrose	1,092,549	294
Jackson Heights–Roosevelt Avenue/74th Street	"7" train	IRT	Flushing Line	April 21, 1917	Queens	Jackson Heights	14,756,015	10
Jackson Heights–Roosevelt Avenue/74th Street	"E" train "F" train "M" train "R" train	IND	Queens Boulevard Line	August 19, 1933	Queens	Jackson Heights	14,756,015	10
Jamaica Center–Parsons/Archer†	"E" train "J" train	BMT Archer Avenue Line, IND Archer Avenue Line		December 11, 1988	Queens	Jamaica		
Jamaica–179th Street†	"F" train	IND	Queens Boulevard Line	December 11, 1950	Queens	Jamaica	3,965,835	87
Jamaica–Van Wyck	"E" train	IND	Archer Avenue Line	December 11, 1988	Queens	Jamaica	1,133,109	289
Jay Street–MetroTech	"R" train	BMT	Fourth Avenue Line	June 11, 1924	Brooklyn	Downtown	8,257,695	26
Jay Street–MetroTech	"A" train "C" train "F" train	IND	Culver Line, Fulton Street Line	February 1, 1933	Brooklyn	Downtown	8,257,695	26
Jefferson Street	"L" train	BMT	Canarsie Line	July 14, 1928	Brooklyn	Bushwick	2,601,754	147
Junction Boulevard	"7" train	IRT	Flushing Line	April 21, 1917	Queens	Corona	6,752,059	33
Junius Street	"3" train	IRT	New Lots Line	November 22, 1920	Brooklyn	Brownsville	553,747	384
Kew Gardens–Union Turnpike	"E" train "F" train	IND	Queens Boulevard Line	December 31, 1936	Queens	Kew Gardens	5,148,711	57
Kings Highway	"B" train "Q" train	BMT	Brighton Line	August 23, 1907	Brooklyn	Midwood	4,432,752	72
Kings Highway	"F" train	IND	Culver Line	March 16, 1919	Brooklyn	Gravesend	694,749	352
Kings Highway	"N" train	BMT	Sea Beach Line	June 22, 1915	Brooklyn	Gravesend	1,362,835	247
Kingsbridge Road	"D" train	IND	Concourse Line	July 1, 1933	The Bronx	Fordham	1,336,891	250
Kingsbridge Road	"4" train	IRT	Jerome Avenue Line	June 2, 1917	The Bronx	Kingsbridge Heights	1,875,531	188
Kingston Avenue	"3" train	IRT	Eastern Parkway Line	August 23, 1920	Brooklyn	Crown Heights	1,010,594	307
Kingston–Throop Avenues	"C" train	IND	Fulton Street Line	April 9, 1936	Brooklyn	Bedford–Stuyvesant	1,627,039	214
Knickerbocker Avenue	"M" train	BMT	Myrtle Avenue Line	August 15, 1889	Brooklyn	Bushwick	1,002,096	311
Kosciuszko Street	"J" train	BMT	Jamaica Line	June 25, 1888	Brooklyn	Bedford–Stuyvesant	1,415,047	238
Lafayette Avenue	"C" train	IND	Fulton Street Line	April 9, 1936	Brooklyn	Fort Greene	1,374,887	243
Lexington Avenue/51st Street	"6" train	IRT	Lexington Avenue Line	July 17, 1918	Manhattan	Midtown	13,335,057	13
Lexington Avenue/51st Street	"E" train "F" train	IND	Queens Boulevard Line	August 19, 1933	Manhattan	Midtown	13,335,057	13
Lexington Avenue/59th Street	"N" train "R" train "W" train	BMT	Broadway Line	September 1, 1919	Manhattan	Midtown	12,048,703	15
Lexington Avenue/59th Street	"4" train "5" train "6" train	IRT	Lexington Avenue Line	July 17, 1918	Manhattan	Midtown	12,048,703	15
Lexington Avenue–63rd Street	"M" train "Q" train	BMT 63rd Street Line, IND 63rd Street Line		October 29, 1989	Manhattan	Upper East Side	4,573,167	66
Liberty Avenue	"C" train	IND	Fulton Street Line	November 28, 1948	Brooklyn	East New York	548,626	386
Livonia Avenue	"L" train	BMT	Canarsie Line	July 28, 1906	Brooklyn	Brownsville	646,319	366
Longwood Avenue	"6" train	IRT	Pelham Line	January 7, 1919	The Bronx	Longwood	658,603	361
Lorimer Street	"J" train "M" train	BMT	Jamaica Line	June 25, 1888	Brooklyn	Williamsburg	1,040,471	303
110th Street–Malcolm X Plaza	"2" train "3" train	IRT	Lenox Avenue Line	November 23, 1904	Manhattan	Harlem	1,761,531	201
Marble Hill–225th Street	"1" train	IRT	Broadway–Seventh Avenue Line	January 14, 1907	Manhattan	Marble Hill	1,071,345	297
Marcy Avenue	"J" train "M" train	BMT	Jamaica Line	June 25, 1888	Brooklyn	Williamsburg	2,975,934	128
Metropolitan Avenue/Lorimer Street	"L" train	BMT	Canarsie Line	June 30, 1924	Brooklyn	Williamsburg	4,685,664	65
Metropolitan Avenue/Lorimer Street	"G" train	IND	Crosstown Line	July 1, 1937	Brooklyn	Williamsburg	4,685,664	65
Mets–Willets Point	"7" train	IRT	Flushing Line	May 7, 1927	Queens	Willets Point	2,377,187	156
Middle Village–Metropolitan Avenue†	"M" train	BMT	Myrtle Avenue Line	October 1, 1906	Queens	Middle Village	865,241	333
Middletown Road	"6" train	IRT	Pelham Line	December 20, 1920	The Bronx	Pelham Bay	404,301	405
Montrose Avenue	"L" train	BMT	Canarsie Line	June 30, 1924	Brooklyn	East Williamsburg	1,827,053	194
Morgan Avenue	"L" train	BMT	Canarsie Line	July 14, 1928	Brooklyn	East Williamsburg	2,076,933	176
Morris Park	"5" train	IRT	Dyre Avenue Line	May 15, 1941	The Bronx	Morris Park	552,828	385
Morrison Avenue–Soundview	"6" train	IRT	Pelham Line	May 30, 1920	The Bronx	Soundview	1,326,992	254
Mosholu Parkway	"4" train	IRT	Jerome Avenue Line	April 15, 1918	The Bronx	Norwood	1,465,845	231
Mount Eden Avenue	"4" train	IRT	Jerome Avenue Line	June 2, 1917	The Bronx	Highbridge	996,963	312
Myrtle Avenue	"J" train "M" train	BMT	Jamaica Line	June 25, 1888	Brooklyn	Bedford–Stuyvesant	2,905,198	132
Myrtle–Willoughby Avenues	"G" train	IND	Crosstown Line	July 1, 1937	Brooklyn	Bedford–Stuyvesant	1,259,021	265
Myrtle–Wyckoff Avenues	"L" train	BMT	Canarsie Line	July 14, 1928	Brooklyn	Bushwick	5,562,014	52
Myrtle–Wyckoff Avenues	"M" train	BMT	Myrtle Avenue Line	July 20, 1889	Brooklyn	Bushwick	5,562,014	52
Nassau Avenue	"G" train	IND	Crosstown Line	August 19, 1933	Brooklyn	Greenpoint	2,633,112	145
Neck Road	"Q" train	BMT	Brighton Line	August 23, 1907	Brooklyn	Homecrest	1,006,699	309
Neptune Avenue	"F" train	IND	Culver Line	May 1, 1920	Brooklyn	Coney Island	333,540	410
Nereid Avenue	"2" train	IRT	White Plains Road Line	March 31, 1917	The Bronx	Wakefield	569,512	379
Nevins Street	"2" train "3" train "4" train "5" train	IRT	Eastern Parkway Line	May 1, 1908	Brooklyn	Downtown	2,214,747	165
New Lots Avenue	"L" train	BMT	Canarsie Line	July 28, 1906	Brooklyn	Brownsville	772,060	346
New Lots Avenue†	"3" train	IRT	New Lots Line	October 16, 1922	Brooklyn	East New York	1,072,117	296
Newkirk Avenue–Little Haiti	"2" train "5" train	IRT	Nostrand Avenue Line	August 23, 1920	Brooklyn	Flatbush	1,607,635	218
Newkirk Plaza	"B" train "Q" train	BMT	Brighton Line	August 23, 1907	Brooklyn	Ditmas Park	2,234,237	162
Northern Boulevard	"M" train "R" train	IND	Queens Boulevard Line	August 19, 1933	Queens	Woodside	1,586,412	222
Norwood Avenue	"J" train	BMT	Jamaica Line	May 30, 1893	Brooklyn	Cypress Hills	571,549	378
Norwood–205th Street†	"D" train	IND	Concourse Line	July 1, 1933	The Bronx	Norwood	1,373,772	244
Nostrand Avenue	"3" train	IRT	Eastern Parkway Line	August 23, 1920	Brooklyn	Crown Heights	811,771	339
Nostrand Avenue	"A" train "C" train	IND	Fulton Street Line	April 9, 1936	Brooklyn	Bedford–Stuyvesant	4,254,913	80
Ocean Parkway	"Q" train	BMT	Brighton Line	April 22, 1917	Brooklyn	Brighton Beach	691,394	353
Ozone Park–Lefferts Boulevard†	"A" train	IND	Fulton Street Line	September 25, 1915	Queens	Richmond Hill	1,347,021	248
Park Place	shuttle train	BMT	Franklin Avenue Line	April 4, 1905	Brooklyn	Crown Heights	417,490	403
Parkchester	"6" train	IRT	Pelham Line	May 30, 1920	The Bronx	Parkchester	2,760,647	139
Parkside Avenue	"Q" train	BMT	Brighton Line	April 4, 1905	Brooklyn	Prospect Lefferts Gardens	1,653,753	212
Parsons Boulevard	"F" train	IND	Queens Boulevard Line	April 24, 1937	Queens	Jamaica	1,586,412	223
Pelham Bay Park†	"6" train	IRT	Pelham Line	December 20, 1920	The Bronx	Pelham Bay	1,208,963	274
Pelham Parkway	"5" train	IRT	Dyre Avenue Line	May 15, 1941	The Bronx	Pelham Gardens	605,144	369
Pelham Parkway	"2" train	IRT	White Plains Road Line	March 3, 1917	The Bronx	Pelham Parkway	1,550,244	225
Pennsylvania Avenue	"3" train	IRT	New Lots Line	December 24, 1920	Brooklyn	East New York	791,529	341
President Street–Medgar Evers College	"2" train "5" train	IRT	Nostrand Avenue Line	August 23, 1920	Brooklyn	Crown Heights	800,941	340
Prince Street	"R" train "W" train	BMT	Broadway Line	September 4, 1917	Manhattan	SoHo	3,616,693	99
Prospect Avenue	"R" train	BMT	Fourth Avenue Line	June 22, 1915	Brooklyn	Gowanus	1,424,322	236
Prospect Avenue	"2" train "5" train	IRT	White Plains Road Line	November 26, 1904	The Bronx	Longwood	1,310,664	259
Prospect Park†	"B" train "Q" train shuttle train	BMT	Brighton Line, Franklin Avenue Line	April 4, 1905	Brooklyn	Prospect Lefferts Gardens	2,429,054	153
Queens Plaza	"E" train "F" train "R" train	IND	Queens Boulevard Line	August 19, 1933	Queens	Long Island City	4,067,662	85
Queensboro Plaza	"7" train "N" train "W" train	BMT Astoria Line, IRT Flushing Line		November 16, 1916	Queens	Long Island City	3,508,362	102
Ralph Avenue	"C" train	IND	Fulton Street Line	April 9, 1936	Brooklyn	Bedford–Stuyvesant	1,221,277	272
Rector Street	"R" train "W" train	BMT	Broadway Line	January 5, 1918	Manhattan	Financial District	1,252,243	266
Rector Street	"1" train	IRT	Broadway–Seventh Avenue Line	July 1, 1918	Manhattan	Financial District	1,816,840	196
Rockaway Avenue	"C" train	IND	Fulton Street Line	April 9, 1936	Brooklyn	Bedford–Stuyvesant	1,249,684	267
Rockaway Avenue	"3" train	IRT	New Lots Line	November 22, 1920	Brooklyn	Brownsville	984,783	314
Rockaway Boulevard	"A" train	IND	Fulton Street Line	September 25, 1915	Queens	Ozone Park	1,607,584	219
Rockaway Park–Beach 116th Street†	shuttle train	IND	Rockaway Line	June 28, 1956	Queens	Rockaway Park	106,664	418
Roosevelt Island	"M" train	IND	63rd Street Line	October 29, 1989	Manhattan	Roosevelt Island	2,265,376	160
St. Lawrence Avenue	"6" train	IRT	Pelham Line	May 30, 1920	The Bronx	Parkchester	926,380	327
Saratoga Avenue	"3" train	IRT	New Lots Line	November 22, 1920	Brooklyn	Brownsville	1,057,612	298
Seneca Avenue	"M" train	BMT	Myrtle Avenue Line	February 22, 1915	Queens	Ridgewood	672,922	358
Sheepshead Bay	"B" train "Q" train	BMT	Brighton Line	August 23, 1907	Brooklyn	Sheepshead Bay	2,776,796	138
Shepherd Avenue	"C" train	IND	Fulton Street Line	November 28, 1948	Brooklyn	East New York	575,269	376
Simpson Street	"2" train "5" train	IRT	White Plains Road Line	November 26, 1904	The Bronx	Longwood	1,669,151	210
Smith–Ninth Streets	"F" train "G" train	IND	Culver Line	October 7, 1933	Brooklyn	Gowanus	1,056,227	299
South Ferry/Whitehall Street†	"R" train "W" train	BMT	Broadway Line	September 20, 1918	Manhattan	Battery Park	6,792,114	32
South Ferry/Whitehall Street†	"1" train	IRT	Broadway–Seventh Avenue Line	March 16, 2009	Manhattan	Battery Park	6,792,114	32
Spring Street	"C" train "E" train	IND	Eighth Avenue Line	September 10, 1932	Manhattan	Hudson Square	3,762,004	96
Spring Street	"6" train	IRT	Lexington Avenue Line	October 27, 1904	Manhattan	Little Italy	3,330,280	111
Steinway Street	"M" train "R" train	IND	Queens Boulevard Line	August 19, 1933	Queens	Astoria	2,971,603	129
Sterling Street	"2" train "5" train	IRT	Nostrand Avenue Line	August 23, 1920	Brooklyn	Prospect Lefferts Gardens	1,298,035	261
Sutphin Boulevard	"F" train	IND	Queens Boulevard Line	April 24, 1937	Queens	Jamaica	985,516	313
Sutphin Boulevard–Archer Avenue–JFK Airport	"E" train "J" train	BMT Archer Avenue Line, IND Archer Avenue Line		December 11, 1988	Queens	Jamaica	7,148,144	31
Sutter Avenue	"L" train	BMT	Canarsie Line	July 28, 1906	Brooklyn	Brownsville	635,155	365
Sutter Avenue–Rutland Road	"3" train	IRT	New Lots Line	November 22, 1920	Brooklyn	East Flatbush	1,364,508	246
Times Square–42nd Street†	shuttle train	IRT	42nd Street Line	October 27, 1904	Manhattan	Times Square	61,203,303	1
Times Square–42nd Street†	"N" train "Q" train "R" train "W" train	BMT	Broadway Line	January 5, 1918	Manhattan	Times Square	61,203,303	1
Times Square–42nd Street†	"1" train "2" train "3" train	IRT	Broadway–Seventh Avenue Line	June 3, 1917	Manhattan	Times Square	61,203,303	1
Times Square–42nd Street†	"7" train	IRT	Flushing Line	March 14, 1927	Manhattan	Times Square	61,203,303	1
Tremont Avenue	"D" train	IND	Concourse Line	July 1, 1933	The Bronx	Tremont	1,746,563	204
Union Street	"R" train	BMT	Fourth Avenue Line	June 22, 1915	Brooklyn	Park Slope	1,992,938	179
Utica Avenue	"A" train "C" train	IND	Fulton Street Line	April 9, 1936	Brooklyn	Bedford–Stuyvesant	3,472,857	105
Van Cortlandt Park–242nd Street†	"1" train	IRT	Broadway–Seventh Avenue Line	August 1, 1908	The Bronx	Riverdale	1,316,535	258
Van Siclen Avenue	"C" train	IND	Fulton Street Line	November 28, 1948	Brooklyn	East New York	658,478	362
Van Siclen Avenue	"J" train	BMT	Jamaica Line	December 3, 1885	Brooklyn	East New York	677,108	356
Van Siclen Avenue	"3" train	IRT	New Lots Line	October 16, 1922	Brooklyn	East New York	498,560	396
Vernon Boulevard–Jackson Avenue	"7" train	IRT	Flushing Line	June 22, 1915	Queens	Long Island City	4,267,158	78
Wakefield–241st Street†	"2" train	IRT	White Plains Road Line	December 13, 1920	The Bronx	Wakefield	828,113	338
Wall Street	"2" train "3" train	IRT	Broadway–Seventh Avenue Line	July 1, 1918	Manhattan	Financial District	4,440,754	71
Wall Street	"4" train "5" train	IRT	Lexington Avenue Line	June 12, 1905	Manhattan	Financial District	3,810,571	95
West Fourth Street–Washington Square	"A" train "B" train "C" train "D" train "E" train "F" train "M" train	IND	Sixth Avenue Line, Eighth Avenue Line	September 10, 1932	Manhattan	Greenwich Village	11,912,274	17
West Eighth Street–New York Aquarium	"F" train "Q" train	BMT Brighton Line, IND Culver Line		May 19, 1919	Brooklyn	Coney Island	679,646	355
West Farms Square–East Tremont Avenue	"2" train "5" train	IRT	White Plains Road Line	November 26, 1904	The Bronx	West Farms	1,206,227	276
Westchester Square–East Tremont Avenue	"6" train	IRT	Pelham Line	October 24, 1920	The Bronx	Westchester Square	972,061	315
Whitlock Avenue	"6" train	IRT	Pelham Line	May 30, 1920	The Bronx	Foxhurst	359,232	406
Wilson Avenue	"L" train	BMT	Canarsie Line	July 14, 1928	Brooklyn	Bushwick	1,155,340	285
Winthrop Street	"2" train "5" train	IRT	Nostrand Avenue Line	August 23, 1920	Brooklyn	Prospect Lefferts Gardens	1,793,809	200
Woodhaven Boulevard	"J" train	BMT	Jamaica Line	May 28, 1917	Queens	Woodhaven	1,096,937	292
Woodhaven Boulevard	"M" train "R" train	IND	Queens Boulevard Line	December 31, 1936	Queens	Elmhurst	4,227,526	69
Woodlawn†	"4" train	IRT	Jerome Avenue Line	April 15, 1918	The Bronx	Norwood	1,369,957	245
WTC Cortlandt	"1" train	IRT	Broadway–Seventh Avenue Line	July 1, 1918	Manhattan	Financial District	4,383,528	74
York Street	"F" train	IND	Sixth Avenue Line	April 9, 1936	Brooklyn	Dumbo	3,872,644	90
Zerega Avenue	"6" train	IRT	Pelham Line	October 24, 1920	The Bronx	Westchester Square	505,384	395

== List of station complexes with differing station names ==
†	Terminal of a regular/daytime service

Station complex	Station name	Services	Div	Line	Opened	Borough	Neighborhood	Ridership (2025)	Rank
Fourth Avenue/Ninth Street	Fourth Avenue	"F" train "G" train	IND	Culver Line	October 7, 1933	Brooklyn	Park Slope	3,120,872	120
Fourth Avenue/Ninth Street	Ninth Street	"R" train	BMT	Fourth Avenue Line	June 22, 1915	Brooklyn	Park Slope	3,120,872	120
14th Street/Sixth Avenue	Sixth Avenue	"L" train	BMT	Canarsie Line	June 30, 1924	Manhattan	Chelsea	11,357,788	18
14th Street/Sixth Avenue	14th Street	"F" train "M" train	IND	Sixth Avenue Line	December 15, 1940	Manhattan	Chelsea	11,357,788	18
14th Street/Sixth Avenue	14th Street	"1" train "2" train "3" train	IRT	Broadway–Seventh Avenue Line	July 1, 1918	Manhattan	Chelsea	11,357,788	18
14th Street/Eighth Avenue	Eighth Avenue†	"L" train	BMT	Canarsie Line	May 30, 1931	Manhattan	Chelsea	12,021,140	16
14th Street/Eighth Avenue	14th Street	"A" train "C" train "E" train	IND	Eighth Avenue Line	September 10, 1932	Manhattan	Chelsea	12,021,140	16
14th Street–Union Square	14th Street–Union Square	"N" train "Q" train "R" train "W" train	BMT	Broadway Line	September 4, 1917	Manhattan	Union Square	24,316,583	4
14th Street–Union Square	14th Street–Union Square	"4" train "5" train "6" train	IRT	Lexington Avenue Line	October 27, 1904	Manhattan	Union Square	24,316,583	4
14th Street–Union Square	Union Square	"L" train	BMT	Canarsie Line	June 30, 1924	Manhattan	Union Square	24,316,583	4
42nd Street–Bryant Park/Fifth Avenue	Fifth Avenue	"7" train	IRT	Flushing Line	March 22, 1926	Manhattan	Midtown	61,203,303	1
42nd Street–Bryant Park/Fifth Avenue	42nd Street–Bryant Park	"B" train "D" train "F" train "M" train	IND	Sixth Avenue Line	December 15, 1940	Manhattan	Midtown	61,203,303	1
62nd Street/New Utrecht Avenue	62nd Street	"D" train	BMT	West End Line	June 24, 1916	Brooklyn	Borough Park	1,200,551	278
62nd Street/New Utrecht Avenue	New Utrecht Avenue	"N" train	BMT	Sea Beach Line	June 22, 1915	Brooklyn	Borough Park	1,200,551	278
Borough Hall/Court Street	Borough Hall	"2" train "3" train	IRT	Broadway–Seventh Avenue Line	April 15, 1919	Brooklyn	Downtown	6,261,766	42
Borough Hall/Court Street	Borough Hall	"4" train "5" train	IRT	Eastern Parkway Line	January 9, 1908	Brooklyn	Downtown	6,261,766	42
Borough Hall/Court Street	Court Street	"R" train	BMT	Fourth Avenue Line	August 1, 1920	Brooklyn	Downtown	6,261,766	42
Broadway–Lafayette Street/Bleecker Street	Bleecker Street	"6" train	IRT	Lexington Avenue Line	October 27, 1904	Manhattan	Greenwich Village	10,773,380	21
Broadway–Lafayette Street/Bleecker Street	Broadway–Lafayette Street	"B" train "D" train "F" train "M" train	IND	Sixth Avenue Line	January 1, 1936	Manhattan	Greenwich Village	10,773,380	21
Brooklyn Bridge–City Hall/Chambers Street	Brooklyn Bridge–City Hall†	"4" train "5" train "6" train	IRT	Lexington Avenue Line	October 27, 1904	Manhattan	Civic Center	6,174,587	44
Brooklyn Bridge–City Hall/Chambers Street	Chambers Street	"J" train	BMT	Nassau Street Line	August 4, 1913	Manhattan	Civic Center	6,174,587	44
Chambers Street–World Trade Center/Park Place/Cortlandt Street	Chambers Street	"A" train "C" train	IND	Eighth Avenue Line	September 10, 1932	Manhattan	Financial District	13,970,793	11
Chambers Street–World Trade Center/Park Place/Cortlandt Street	Cortlandt Street	"R" train "W" train	BMT	Broadway Line	January 5, 1918	Manhattan	Financial District	13,970,793	11
Chambers Street–World Trade Center/Park Place/Cortlandt Street	Park Place	"2" train "3" train	IRT	Broadway–Seventh Avenue Line	July 1, 1918	Manhattan	Financial District	13,970,793	11
Chambers Street–World Trade Center/Park Place/Cortlandt Street	World Trade Center†	"E" train	IND	Eighth Avenue Line	September 10, 1932	Manhattan	Financial District	13,970,793	11
Court Square–23rd Street	Court Square†	"G" train	IND	Crosstown Line	August 19, 1933	Queens	Long Island City	6,364,588	40
Court Square–23rd Street	Court Square	"7" train	IRT	Flushing Line	November 5, 1916	Queens	Long Island City	6,364,588	40
Court Square–23rd Street	Court Square–23rd Street	"E" train "F" train	IND	Queens Boulevard Line	August 28, 1939	Queens	Long Island City	6,364,588	40
Delancey Street/Essex Street	Delancey Street	"F" train	IND	Sixth Avenue Line	January 1, 1936	Manhattan	Lower East Side	7,776,499	27
Delancey Street/Essex Street	Essex Street	"J" train "M" train	BMT	Nassau Street Line	September 16, 1908	Manhattan	Lower East Side	7,776,499	27
Franklin Avenue/Botanic Garden	Botanic Garden	shuttle train	BMT	Franklin Avenue Line	September 30, 1928	Brooklyn	Crown Heights	3,663,237	97
Franklin Avenue/Botanic Garden	Franklin Avenue–Medgar Evers College	"2" train "3" train "4" train "5" train	IRT	Eastern Parkway Line	August 23, 1920	Brooklyn	Crown Heights	3,663,237	97
Grand Central–42nd Street	Grand Central†	shuttle train	IRT	42nd Street Line	October 27, 1904	Manhattan	Midtown	35,764,931	2
Grand Central–42nd Street	Grand Central–42nd Street	"7" train	IRT	Flushing Line	June 22, 1915	Manhattan	Midtown	35,764,931	2
Grand Central–42nd Street	Grand Central–42nd Street	"4" train "5" train "6" train	IRT	Lexington Avenue Line	July 17, 1918	Manhattan	Midtown	35,764,931	2
Jackson Heights–Roosevelt Avenue/74th Street	74th Street–Broadway	"7" train	IRT	Flushing Line	April 21, 1917	Queens	Jackson Heights	14,756,015	10
Jackson Heights–Roosevelt Avenue/74th Street	Jackson Heights–Roosevelt Avenue	"E" train "F" train "M" train "R" train	IND	Queens Boulevard Line	August 19, 1933	Queens	Jackson Heights	14,756,015	10
Lexington Avenue/51st Street	51st Street	"6" train	IRT	Lexington Avenue Line	July 17, 1918	Manhattan	Midtown	13,335,057	13
Lexington Avenue/51st Street	Lexington Avenue–53rd Street	"E" train "F" train	IND	Queens Boulevard Line	August 19, 1933	Manhattan	Midtown	13,335,057	13
Lexington Avenue/59th Street	59th Street	"4" train "5" train "6" train	IRT	Lexington Avenue Line	July 17, 1918	Manhattan	Midtown	12,048,703	15
Lexington Avenue/59th Street	Lexington Avenue–59th Street	"N" train "R" train "W" train	BMT	Broadway Line	September 1, 1919	Manhattan	Midtown	12,048,703	15
Metropolitan Avenue/Lorimer Street	Lorimer Street	"L" train	BMT	Canarsie Line	June 30, 1924	Brooklyn	Williamsburg	4,685,664	65
Metropolitan Avenue/Lorimer Street	Metropolitan Avenue	"G" train	IND	Crosstown Line	July 1, 1937	Brooklyn	Williamsburg	4,685,664	65
South Ferry/Whitehall Street	South Ferry†	"1" train	IRT	Broadway–Seventh Avenue Line	March 16, 2009	Manhattan	Battery Park	6,792,114	32
South Ferry/Whitehall Street	Whitehall Street–South Ferry	"R" train "W" train	BMT	Broadway Line	September 20, 1918	Manhattan	Battery Park	6,792,114	32
Times Square–42nd Street/Port Authority Bus Terminal/Bryant Park/Fifth Avenue	Fifth Avenue	"7" train	IRT	Flushing Line	March 22, 1926	Manhattan	Midtown	61,203,303	1
Times Square–42nd Street/Port Authority Bus Terminal/Bryant Park/Fifth Avenue	42nd Street–Bryant Park	"B" train "D" train "F" train "M" train	IND	Sixth Avenue Line	December 15, 1940	Manhattan	Midtown	61,203,303	1
Times Square–42nd Street/Port Authority Bus Terminal/Bryant Park/Fifth Avenue	42nd Street–Port Authority Bus Terminal	"A" train "C" train "E" train	IND	Eighth Avenue Line	September 10, 1932	Manhattan	Midtown	61,203,303	1
Times Square–42nd Street/Port Authority Bus Terminal/Bryant Park/Fifth Avenue	Times Square†	shuttle train	IRT	42nd Street Line	October 27, 1904	Manhattan	Times Square	61,203,303	1
Times Square–42nd Street/Port Authority Bus Terminal/Bryant Park/Fifth Avenue	Times Square–42nd Street	"N" train "Q" train "R" train "W" train	BMT	Broadway Line	January 5, 1918	Manhattan	Times Square	61,203,303	1
Times Square–42nd Street/Port Authority Bus Terminal/Bryant Park/Fifth Avenue	Times Square–42nd Street	"1" train "2" train "3" train	IRT	Broadway–Seventh Avenue Line	June 3, 1917	Manhattan	Times Square	61,203,303	1
Times Square–42nd Street/Port Authority Bus Terminal/Bryant Park/Fifth Avenue	Times Square–42nd Street	"7" train	IRT	Flushing Line	March 14, 1927	Manhattan	Times Square	61,203,303	1

== Stations with the same name along the same services ==
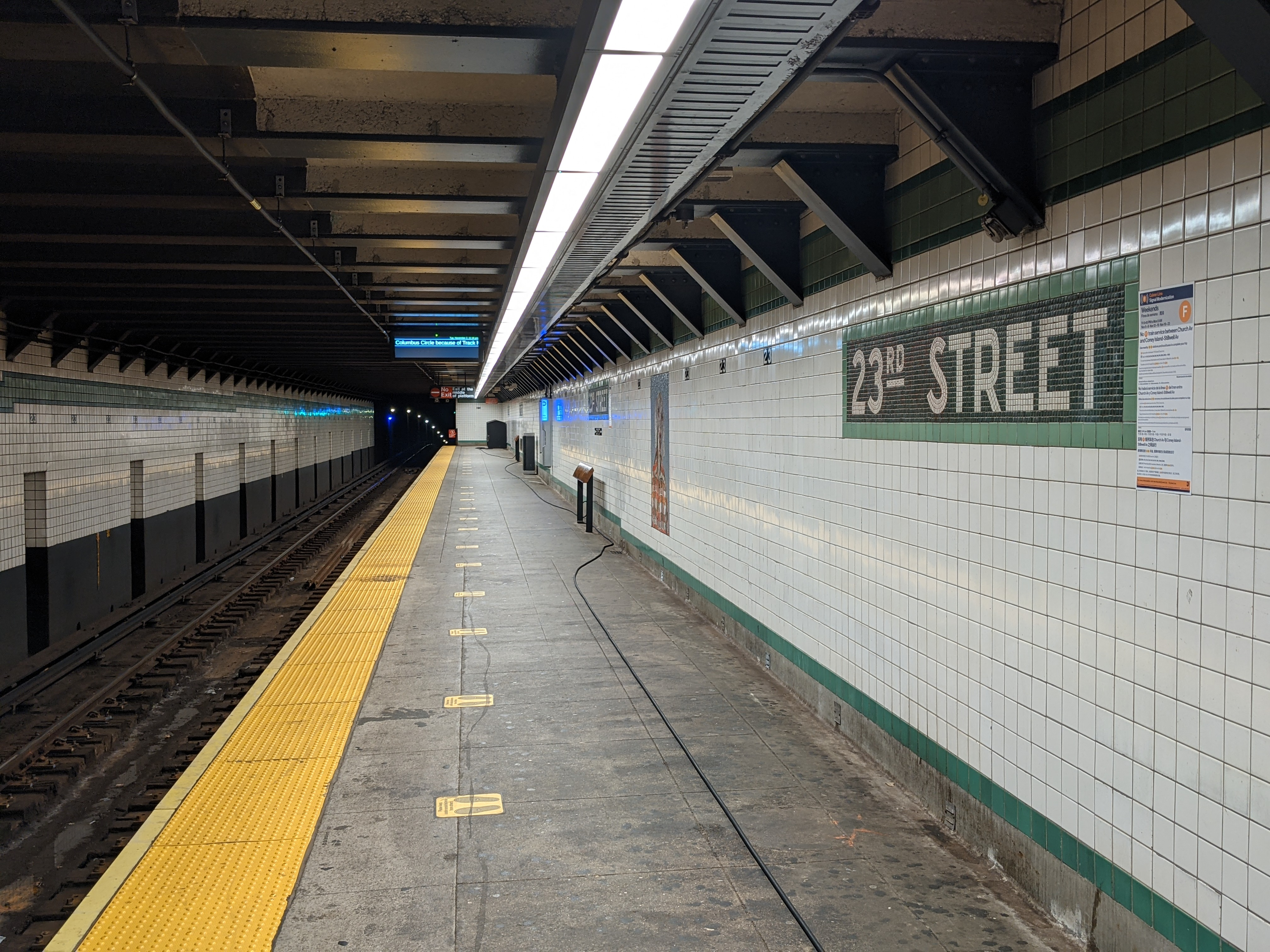
At six stations, "23rd Street" and "86th Street" are the most common station names. This 23rd Street station is on the IND Sixth Avenue Line in Manhattan.

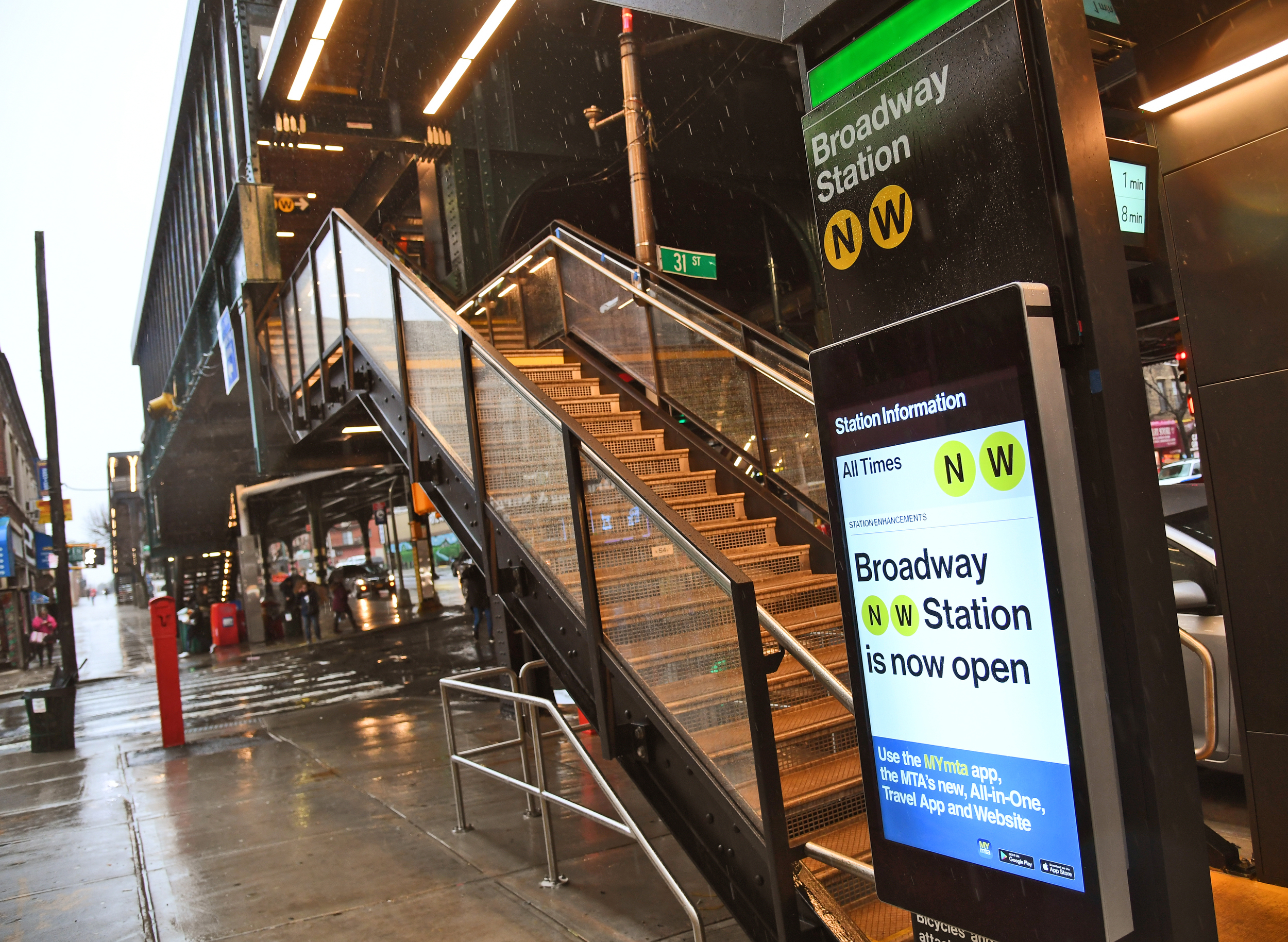
The name "Broadway" is used in three boroughs, the most of any name. This Broadway station is on the BMT Astoria Line in Queens

Many stations share the same name. These stations are disambiguated by the line each of them is on. The following stations are served by the same numbered or lettered trains.

- The 2 and 5 stop at two stations with Medgar Evers College in the name, both of which are located in Brooklyn, Franklin Avenue–Medgar Evers College on the IRT Eastern Parkway Line and President Street–Medgar Evers College on the Nostrand Avenue Line. They both also stop at two stations with 149th Street in the name, both on the IRT White Plains Road Line in the Bronx: 149th Street–Grand Concourse and Third Avenue–149th Street.
- The 4 and 5 stop at two stations with Grand Concourse in the name: 149th Street–Grand Concourse on the IRT Jerome Avenue and White Plains Road Lines, and 138th Street–Grand Concourse also on the Jerome Avenue Line.
- The 5 on each of its two northern branches in the Bronx stops at two stations that bear the same full name: Gun Hill Road on the Dyre Avenue Line and the White Plains Road Line, and Pelham Parkway on the Dyre Avenue Line and the White Plains Road Line.
- The 7 on the IRT Flushing Line and S (42nd Street Shuttle) stop at two stations with 42nd Street in the name: Times Square–42nd Street and Grand Central–42nd Street, both in Manhattan.
- The A in the northbound direction stops at two stations with Aqueduct in the name: Aqueduct Racetrack and Aqueduct–North Conduit Avenue, both on the IND Rockaway Line in Queens.
- The B stops at two stations whose full names are Seventh Avenue, located along the BMT Brighton Line in Brooklyn and the IND Sixth Avenue Line in Manhattan.
- The D stops at three stations with 50th Street in the name: 47th–50th Streets–Rockefeller Center on the IND Sixth Avenue Line in Manhattan, 50th Street on the West End Line in Brooklyn, and Bay 50th Street, also on the West End Line.
- The E stops at two stations with 23rd Street in the name: 23rd Street on the Eighth Avenue Line in Manhattan and Court Square–23rd Street on the Queens Boulevard Line in Queens. It also stops at two stations with Jamaica in the name, both of which are on the IND Archer Avenue Line in Queens: Jamaica–Van Wyck and Jamaica Center–Parsons/Archer.
- The E and F stop at two stations with 53rd Street in the name: Lexington Avenue–53rd Street and Fifth Avenue/53rd Street, both on the Queens Boulevard Line in Manhattan.
- On weekdays during the day, the F stops at two stations with 23rd Street in the name: 23rd Street along the Sixth Avenue Line in Manhattan and Court Square–23rd Street on the Queens Boulevard Line in Queens.
- The M stops at two stations with Myrtle Avenue in the name: Myrtle Avenue on the BMT Jamaica Line and Myrtle–Wyckoff Avenues on the BMT Myrtle Avenue Line, both in Brooklyn.
- The N and R stop at three stations with 59th Street in the name: Lexington Avenue/59th Street on the BMT Broadway Line in Manhattan, Fifth Avenue–59th Street, also on the BMT Broadway Line, and 59th Street on the Fourth Avenue Line in Brooklyn.
- The N and W stop at two stations with Astoria in the name: Astoria Boulevard and Astoria–Ditmars Boulevard, located adjacent to one another on the BMT Astoria Line in Queens.
- The R stops at two stations whose full names are 36th Street: one along the Fourth Avenue Line in Brooklyn and one along the Queens Boulevard Line in Queens.
- The W stops at two stations with 59th Street in the name: Lexington Avenue/59th Street and Fifth Avenue–59th Street, both on the BMT Broadway Line in Manhattan.

== See also ==
- New York City Subway stations
- List of New York City Subway transfer stations
- List of New York City Subway terminals
- List of closed New York City Subway stations
- List of Staten Island Railway stations
- Accessibility of the Metropolitan Transportation Authority
- List of New York City Subway stations in the Bronx
- List of New York City Subway stations in Brooklyn
- List of New York City Subway stations in Manhattan
- List of New York City Subway stations in Queens
