= A. Zerega's Sons, Inc. =

American pasta manufacturer

Coordinates: 40°55′23.18″N 74°06′59.27″W

- Industry: Food Manufacturing
- Founded: 1848; 178 years ago
- Founder: Antoine Zerega
- Headquarters: Fair Lawn, New Jersey, United States
- Products: Pasta
- Website: zerega.com

A. Zerega's Sons, Inc. was a privately owned pasta company with plants in Fair Lawn, New Jersey and Lee's Summit, Missouri. The company was founded by Antoine Zerega in Brooklyn, New York in 1848 making it the first pasta company in the United States. Antoine's son Frank was a pasta maker for 83 years and served as the company's president. Zerega Avenue in the Bronx and the elevated train station on the New York City Subway's Pelham Line were named after Augustus Di Zerega, a ship owner . The company moved from Brooklyn at 28 Front Street to Fair Lawn in 1952.

In May 2020 it was announced that Zerega's was sold to fifth-generation family-owned Philadelphia Macaroni.
