= Buhre Avenue station =

New York City Subway station in the Bronx

Buhre Avenue
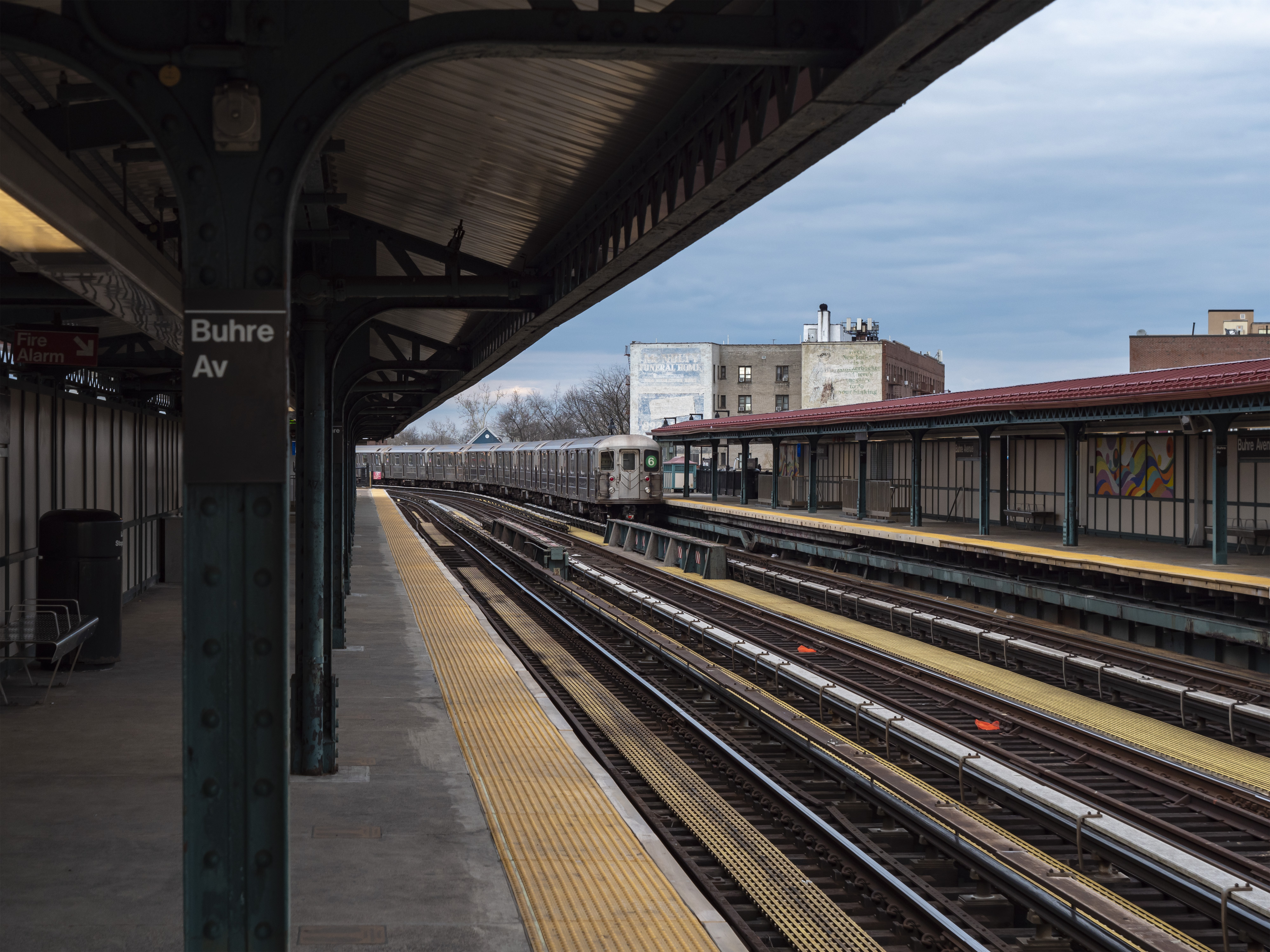
- Northbound 6 train leaving the station

Station statistics
- Address: Buhre Avenue and Westchester Avenue; Bronx, New York
- Borough: The Bronx
- Locale: Pelham Bay
- Coordinates: 40.846995°N 73.832331°W
- Division: A (IRT)
- Line: IRT Pelham Line
- Services: 6 (all times except weekdays until 8:45 p.m., peak direction) <6> (weekdays until 8:45 p.m., peak direction)
- Transit: NYCT Bus: Bx8, Bx24; MTA Bus: BxM8
- Structure: Elevated
- Platforms: 2 side platforms
- Tracks: 3 (2 in regular service)

Other information
- Opened: December 20, 1920; 105 years ago
- Rebuilt: July 5, 2014; 12 years ago to April 27, 2015; 11 years ago

Traffic
- 2025: 780,963 ▲1.9%
- Rank: 344 out of 423
Services
Preceding station	New York City Subway	Following station
Pelham Bay Park 6 <6> Terminus	Local	Middletown Road 6 <6> toward Brooklyn Bridge–City Hall
Location
Location within New York City Subway
Location within New York City
Location within New York
Track layout
Street map
Station service legend
Symbol	Description
Stops all times except rush hours in the peak direction	Stops all times except rush hours in the peak direction
Stops rush hours in the peak direction only	Stops rush hours in the peak direction only

The Buhre Avenue station (/bjʊər/, rhyming with "pure") is a local station on the IRT Pelham Line of the New York City Subway. Located at the intersection of Buhre and Westchester Avenues in the Pelham Bay neighborhood of the Bronx, it is served by the 6 train at all times except weekdays in the peak direction, when the <6> train takes over service.

== History ==
This station opened on December 20, 1920 with the extension of the Pelham Line from Westchester Square to Pelham Bay Park. Service was originally provided by a mix of through and shuttle trains during the 1920s.

From July 5, 2014, to April 27, 2015, as part of a $109 million rebuilding project at five Pelham Line stations, this station, along with Zerega Avenue, was closed for station rehabilitation work.

== Station layout ==
There are three tracks and two side platforms. The center track is not used in regular service. The 6 local train serves the station at all times except rush hours in the peak direction, when the <6> express train serves the station instead. The next stop to the south is Middletown Road, while the next stop to the north is Pelham Bay Park. It resembles other elevated stations along the line in that it has a wood mezzanine and no windscreens along the platform edges.

The platform lights are sodium vapor, but the wood mezzanine only has old-style lights that are quite dim. There are non-working old lights on the platform, covered old signs, and two extra exits from the fare control area. Holding lights have been added in two places along the uptown platform, so that trains can be kept at this station when the two tracks at the Pelham Bay Park terminal are occupied.

=== Exits ===
The station's only exit is a mezzanine beneath the tracks. Outside fare control, stairs lead to the northern, western, and southern corners of the seven-pointed intersection of Westchester, Buhre, Crosby, and Edison Avenues.

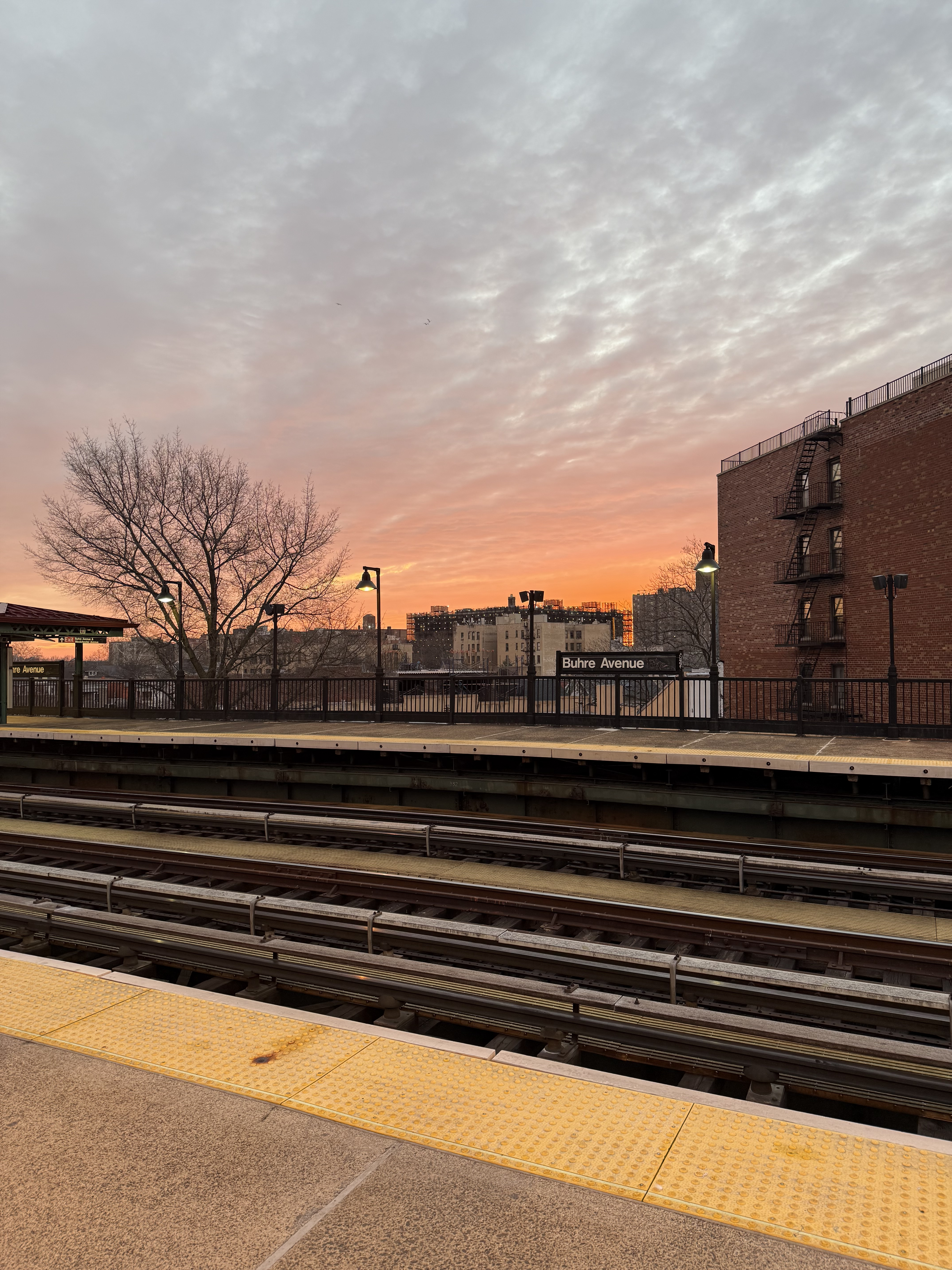
Dawn at Burhe Avenue station, December 2025

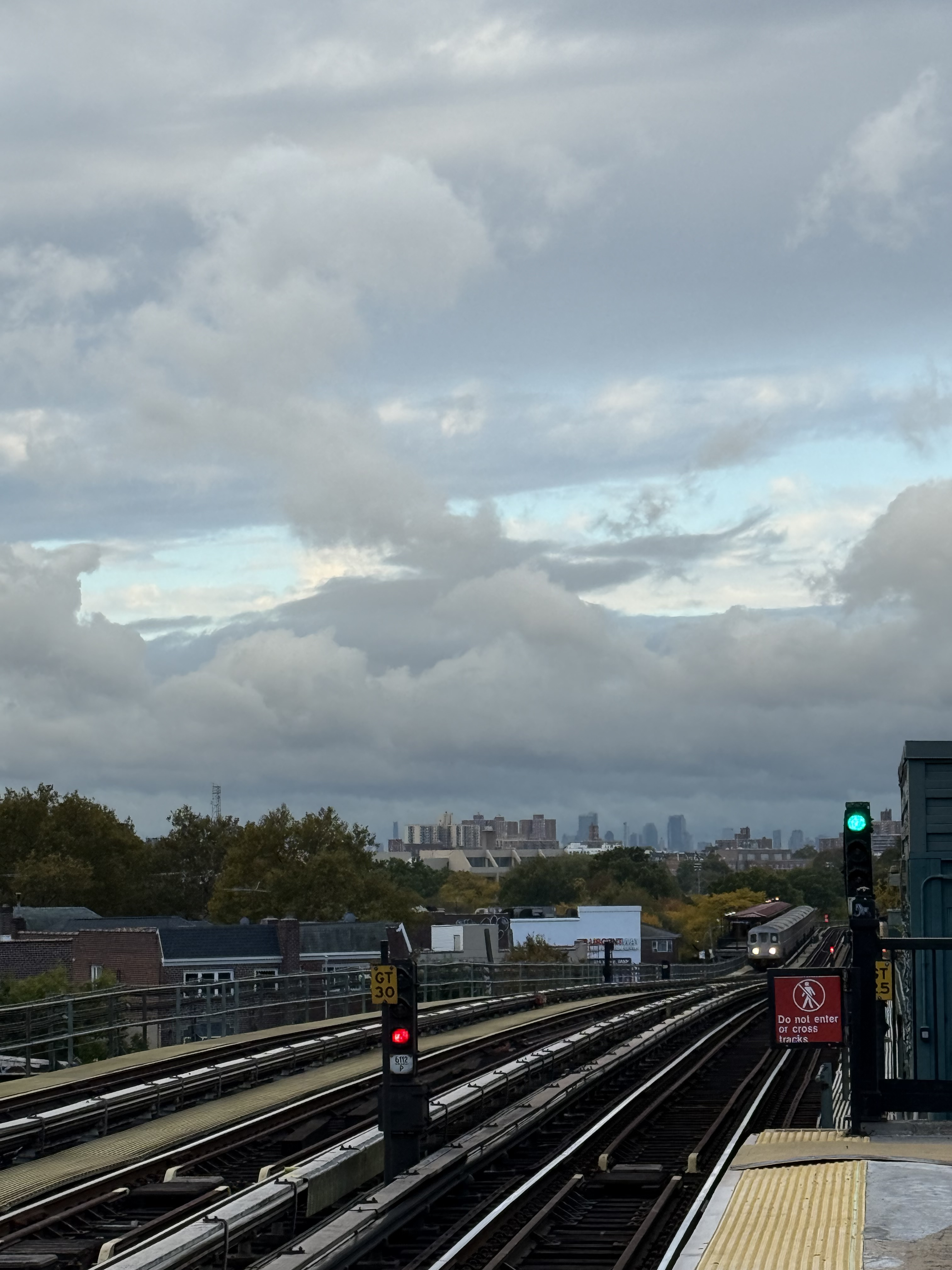
Cloudy morning at Burhe Avenue station, September 2025
