= Middletown Road station =

New York City Subway station in the Bronx

Middletown Road
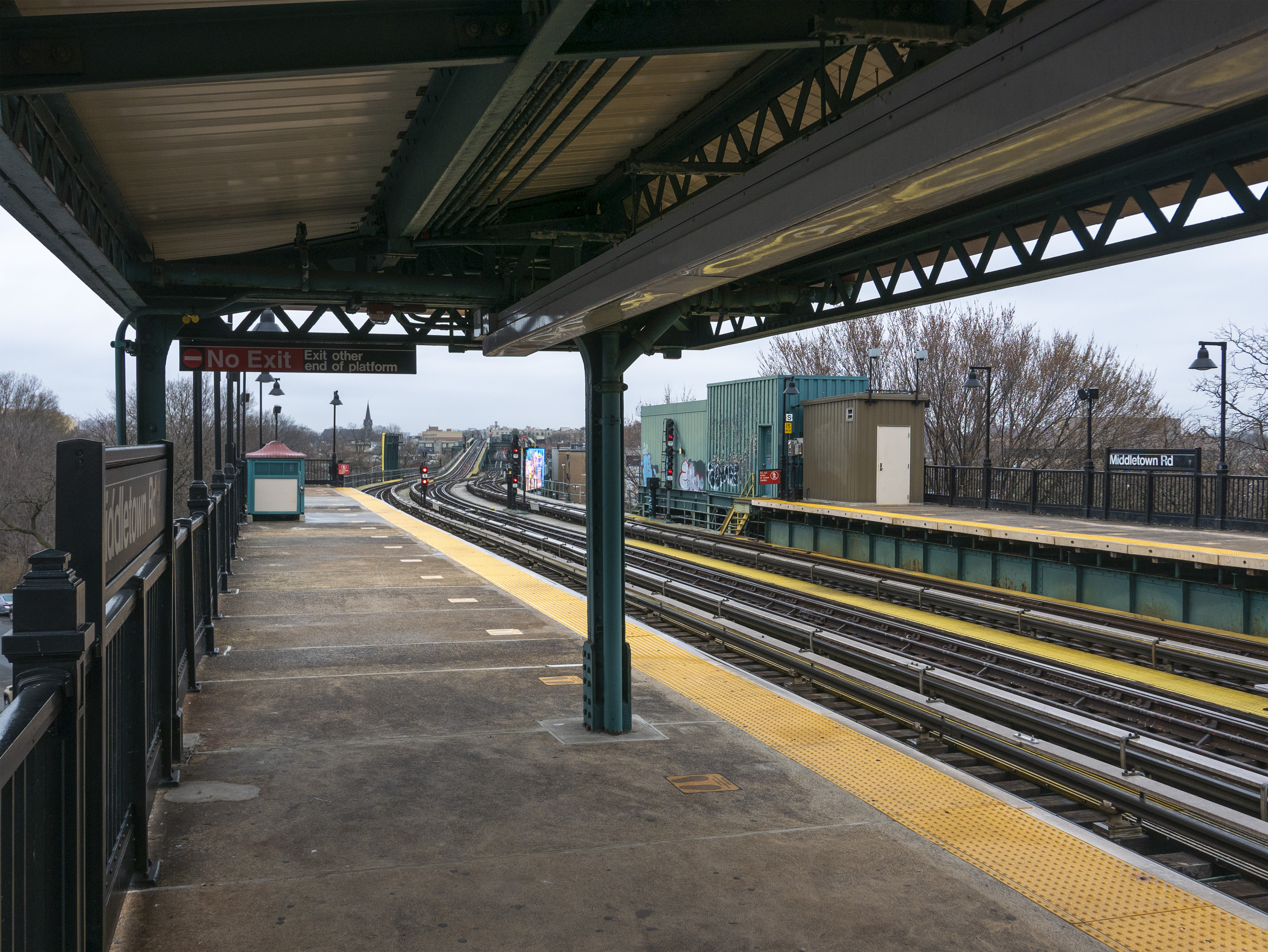
- View south from northbound platform

Station statistics
- Address: Middletown Road and Westchester Avenue; Bronx, New York
- Borough: The Bronx
- Locale: Pelham Bay
- Coordinates: 40.843424°N 73.836751°W
- Division: A (IRT)
- Line: IRT Pelham Line
- Services: 6 (all times except weekdays until 8:45 p.m., peak direction) <6> (weekdays until 8:45 p.m., peak direction)
- Transit: NYCT Bus: Bx8, Bx24
- Structure: Elevated
- Platforms: 2 side platforms
- Tracks: 3 (2 in regular service)

Other information
- Opened: December 20, 1920; 105 years ago
- Rebuilt: October 5, 2013; 13 years ago to May 4, 2014; 12 years ago
- Accessible: No; under construction

Traffic
- 2025: 404,301 ▲1%
- Rank: 405 out of 423
Services
| Preceding station | New York City Subway | Following station |
|---|---|---|
| Buhre Avenue 6 <6> toward Pelham Bay Park | Local | Westchester Square–East Tremont Avenue 6 <6> toward Brooklyn Bridge–City Hall |
Location
Location within New York City Subway
Location within New York City
Location within New York
Track layout
Street map
Station service legend
| Symbol | Description |
| Stops all times except rush hours in the peak direction | Stops all times except rush hours in the peak direction |
| Stops rush hours in the peak direction only | Stops rush hours in the peak direction only |

The Middletown Road station is a local station of the IRT Pelham Line of the New York City Subway. Located at Middletown Road and Westchester Avenue in the Pelham Bay neighborhood of the Bronx, it is served by the 6 train at all times except weekdays in the peak direction, when the <6> train takes over service.

== History ==
=== Construction and opening ===
In 1913, New York City, the Brooklyn Rapid Transit Company, and the Interborough Rapid Transit Company (IRT) reached an agreement, known as the Dual Contracts, to dramatically expand subway service across the city. The portion of the agreement between New York City and the IRT was known as Contract 3. As part of this contract, the IRT agreed to construct a branch of the original subway, which opened in 1904, north along Lexington Avenue with branches along Jerome Avenue and a three-track branch running northeast via 138th Street, Southern Boulevard and Westchester Avenue to Pelham Bay Park.

The construction of the Lexington Avenue Line, in conjunction with the construction of the Broadway–Seventh Avenue Line would change the operations of the IRT system. Instead of having trains go via Broadway, turning onto 42nd Street, before finally turning onto Park Avenue, there would be two trunk lines connected by the 42nd Street Shuttle. The system would be changed from looking like a "Z" system on a map to an "H" system. One trunk would run via the new Lexington Avenue Line down Park Avenue, and the other trunk would run via the new Seventh Avenue Line up Broadway.

This station opened on December 20, 1920, as part of the final extension of the Pelham Line from Westchester Square to Pelham Bay Park. Service to Pelham Bay Park was originally provided by a mix of through and shuttle trains during the 1920s.

=== Renovation ===
From October 5, 2013, to May 4, 2014, the station was closed for rehabilitation work. The Metropolitan Transportation Authority (MTA) was sued for violating the Americans with Disabilities Act (ADA) by not including elevators in the renovation. The United States Department of Justice joined the lawsuit as a plaintiff in 2018, and a federal judge ruled in 2019 that the MTA had indeed violated the ADA. The MTA announced in December 2024 that two new street-to-platform elevators would be installed at Middletown Road as part of the agency's 2020–2024 capital plan. A groundbreaking ceremony for the two elevators occurred on October 3, 2025.

== Station layout ==
This elevated station has two side platforms and three tracks. The center express track is not used in regular service. South of the station are track leads to Westchester Yard, the main yard for all 6 and <6> trains. The center and Manhattan-bound local tracks rise above these leads. The 6 local train serves the station at all times except rush hours in the peak direction, when the <6> express train serves the station instead. The next stop to the south is Westchester Square–East Tremont Avenue, while the next stop to the north is Buhre Avenue.

Both platforms have beige windscreens and red canopies with green frames and support columns in the center. On either ends are white waist-high steel fences with sodium lampposts at regular intervals. The station name signs are in the standard black plates with white Helvetica lettering.

=== Exits ===
This station has one wooden elevated mezzanine below the platforms and tracks. Two staircases from the center of each platform go down to the mezzanine, where a turnstile bank provides access to and from the station. Outside fare control, there is a token booth and two street stairs. One goes south down to the triangular corner of Middletown Road and Westchester Avenue and the other to the north side of Westchester Avenue.
