= Westchester Square–East Tremont Avenue station =

New York City Subway station in the Bronx

Westchester Square– East Tremont Avenue
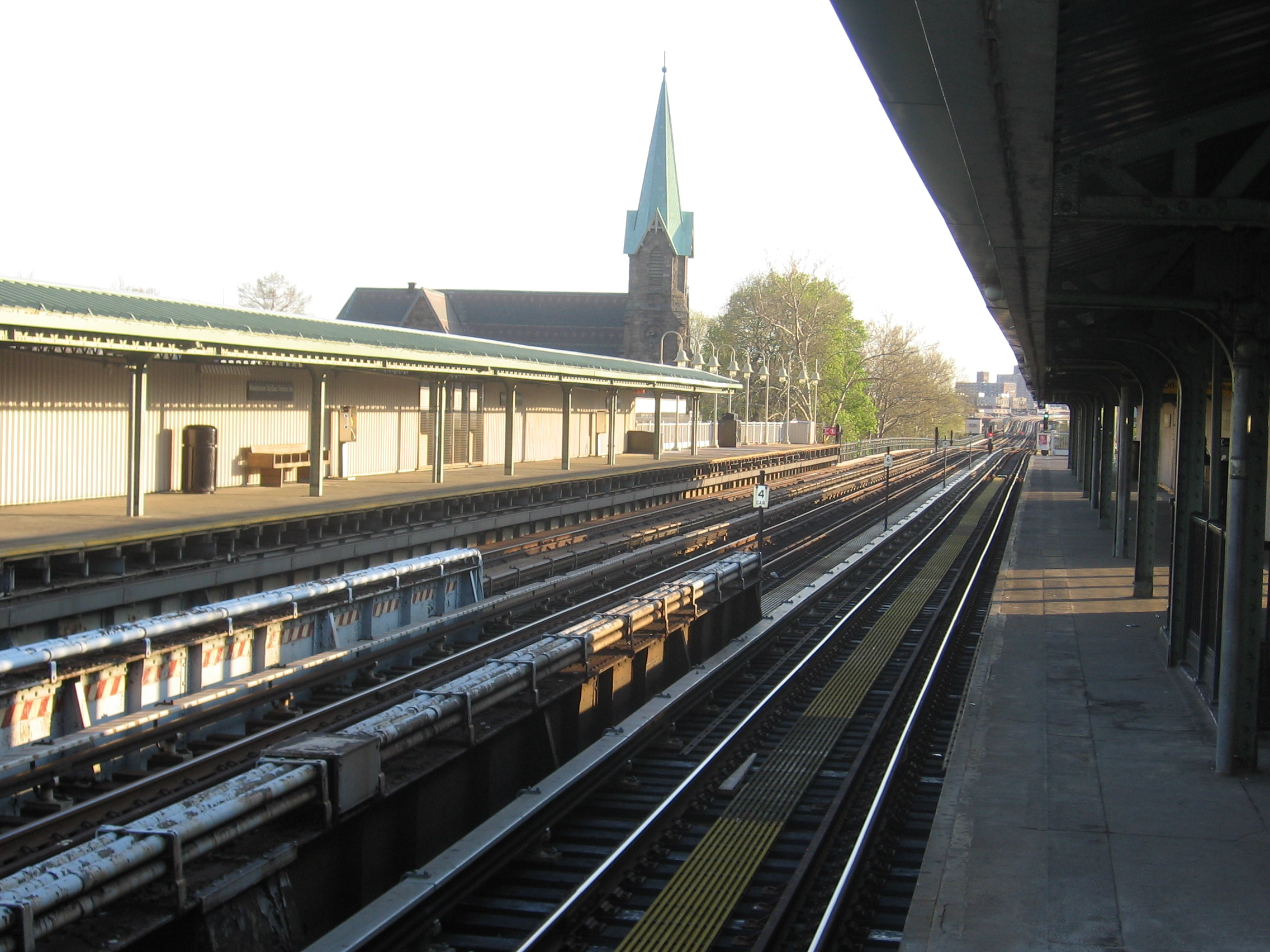
- View from the southbound platform, prior to renovation

Station statistics
- Address: East Tremont Avenue and Westchester Avenue; Bronx, New York
- Borough: The Bronx
- Locale: Westchester Square
- Coordinates: 40.840567°N 73.842072°W
- Division: A (IRT)
- Line: IRT Pelham Line
- Services: 6 (all times except weekdays until 8:45 p.m., peak direction) <6> (weekdays until 8:45 p.m., peak direction)
- Transit: NYCT Bus: Bx4, Bx4A, Bx8, Bx21, Bx24, Bx31, Bx40, Bx42
- Structure: Elevated
- Platforms: 2 side platforms
- Tracks: 3 (2 in regular service)

Other information
- Opened: October 24, 1920; 106 years ago
- Accessible: Yes
- Former/other names: Westchester Square

Traffic
- 2025: 972,061 ▲36%
- Rank: 315 out of 423
Services
Preceding station	New York City Subway	Following station
Middletown Road 6 <6> toward Pelham Bay Park	Local	Zerega Avenue 6 <6> toward Brooklyn Bridge–City Hall
Location
Location within New York City Subway
Location within New York City
Location within New York
Track layout
Street map
Station service legend
Symbol	Description
Stops all times except rush hours in the peak direction	Stops all times except rush hours in the peak direction
Stops rush hours in the peak direction only	Stops rush hours in the peak direction only
- Westchester Square Station (Dual System IRT)
- U.S. National Register of Historic Places
- MPS: New York City Subway System MPS
- NRHP reference No.: 05000227
- Added to NRHP: March 30, 2003

The Westchester Square–East Tremont Avenue station (formerly Westchester Square station) is a local station on the IRT Pelham Line of the New York City Subway. Located at the intersection of East Tremont and Westchester Avenues within the Westchester Square neighborhood, and on the border of Pelham Bay in the Bronx, it is served by the 6 train at all times except weekdays in the peak direction, when the <6> train takes over service.

== History ==
This station was built as part of the Pelham Line, which was part of the Dual Contracts, signed on March 19, 1913, and also known as the Dual Subway System. The Pelham Line was proposed to be a branch of the Lexington Avenue Line running northeast via 138th Street, Southern Boulevard and Westchester Avenue to Pelham Bay Park. This station opened on October 24, 1920 as the line's new terminal with the line's extension from East 177th Street. Service was initially served by a mix of through and shuttle trains during the 1920s.

In 1981, the Metropolitan Transportation Authority (MTA) listed the station among the 69 most deteriorated stations in the subway system.

Under the 2015–2019 MTA Capital Program, the station, along with thirty other New York City Subway stations, was to undergo a complete overhaul and would have been entirely closed for up to six months. Updates would have included cellular service, Wi-Fi, charging stations, improved signage, and improved station lighting. However, these renovations were deferred due to a lack of funding. Regardless, the station was closed in one direction for approximately two months (one month per direction) to facilitate ADA accessibility renovations.

As part of a revision to the Capital Program in April 2018, the MTA announced that the station would have elevators installed, making the station ADA-accessible. By February 2021, funding had been committed to accessibility renovations at the station. In December 2021, the MTA awarded a contract for the installation of elevators at eight stations, including the Westchester Square station. The project, which also included structural repairs and restoration of historic features, cost $122.5 million, of which $98.6 million was funded by the Federal Transit Administration. In addition, four new stairways were added, eight stairways were renovated, and new fire alarm and communication systems, and CCTV cameras were installed. As of July 2022, the project was scheduled to be completed in May 2024, but the elevators did not open until January 2025.

== Station layout ==
This elevated station has three tracks and two side platforms. The center track is not used in regular service. The 6 local train serves the station at all times except rush hours in the peak direction, when the <6> express train serves the station instead. The next stop to the south is Zerega Avenue, while the next stop to the north is Middletown Road.

As part of the MTA Arts & Design program, the station features a stained glass artwork by Romare Bearden, which is known variously as City of Light or City of Glass. The artwork, a triptych measuring 9 by 6 feet (2.7 by 1.8 m) across, depicts a subway train traveling past a skyline. It was designed in 1982 but not installed until 1993, after Bearden died. The station also has eight painted steel panels in the station walls on the platforms that is intended to honor the area's native inhabitants. This artwork, titled The Land Between Open Water, is by Shervone Neckles, and was installed in 2024.

There are glass block tile and "uptown" and "downtown" directional mosaics in the mezzanine. From the northbound platform, there is a good view of the Bronx–Whitestone and Throgs Neck Bridges. Westchester Yard is located railroad north of the station, to the west of the Pelham Line itself. There are no windscreens.

=== Exit ===
The station's only exit is a mezzanine beneath the tracks in Westchester Square. Outside fare control, a stair and an elevator lead to the northeast corner of Westchester Avenue and Lane Avenue.

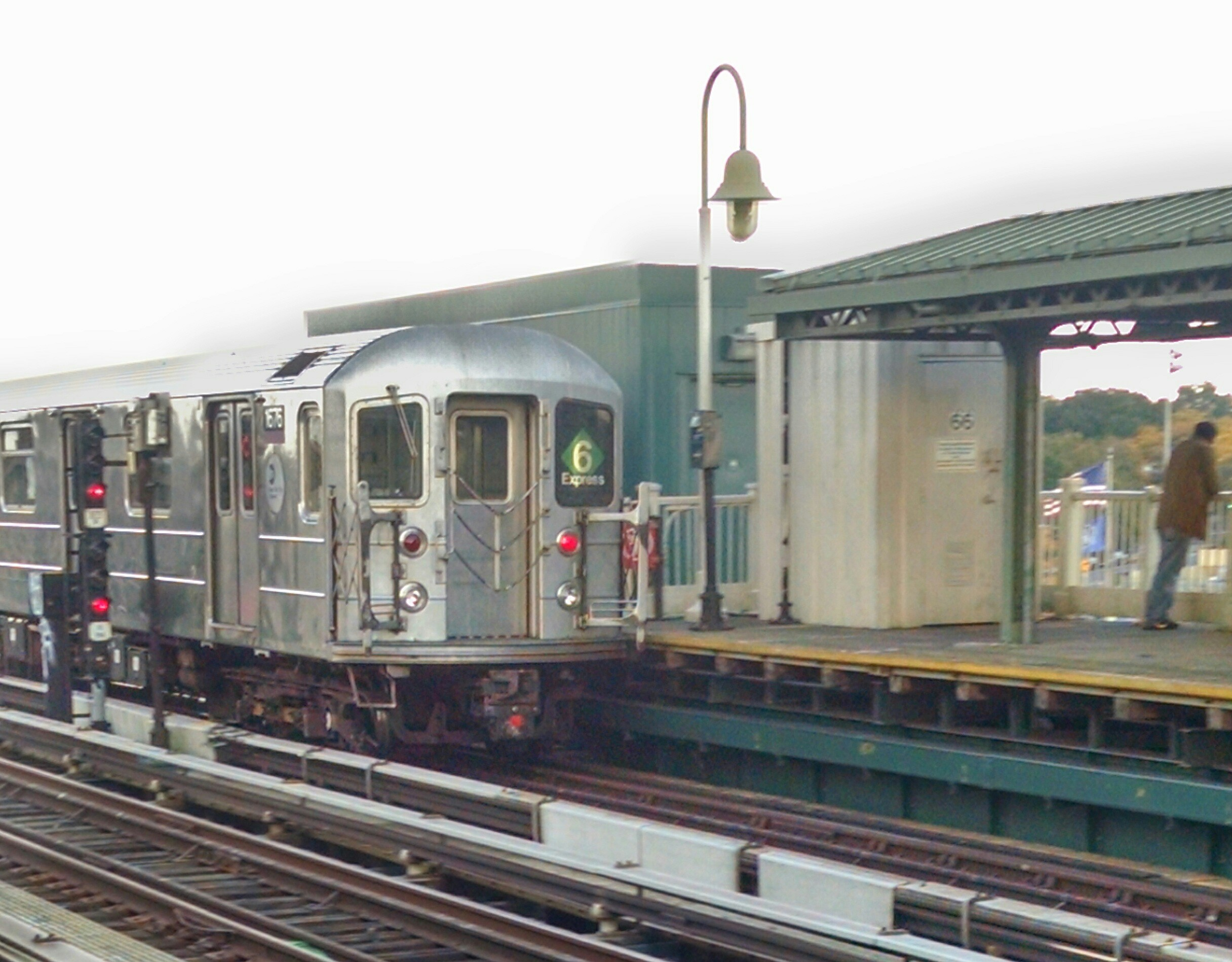
<6> train leaving station

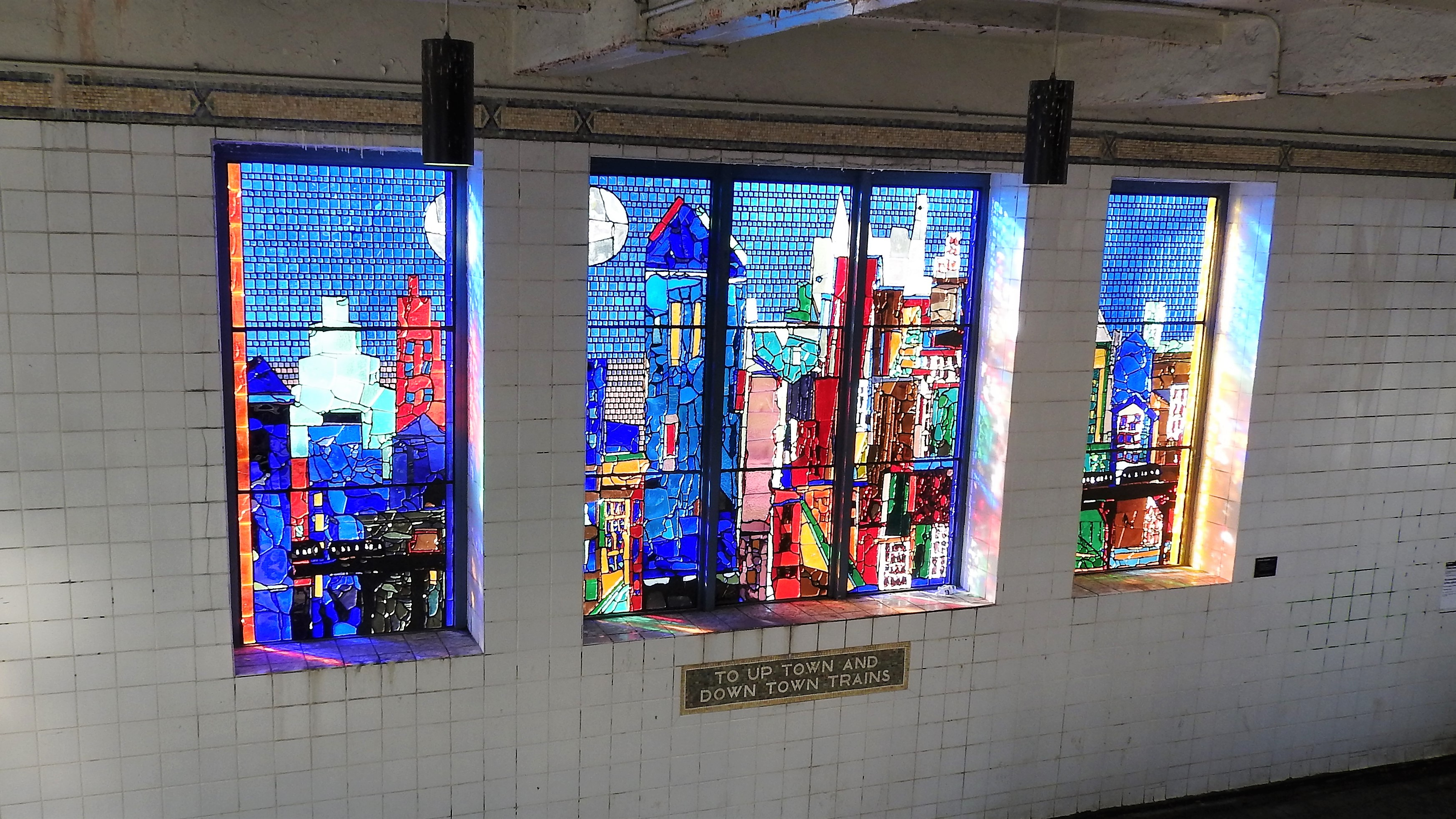
City of Light/City of Glass artwork by Romare Bearden (1993)

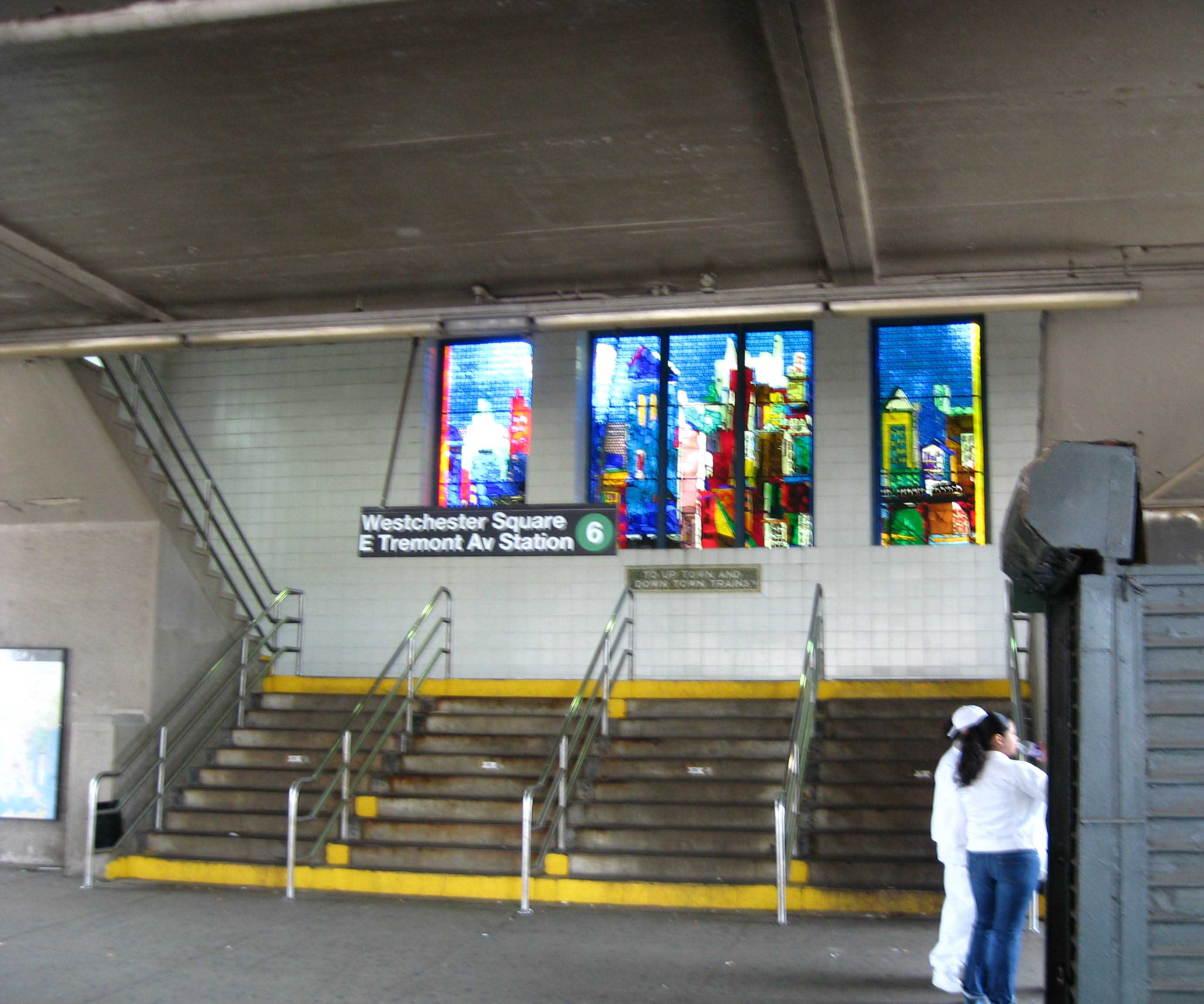
Street staircase

== Nearby points of interest ==
- Herbert H. Lehman High School
- Huntington Free Library and Reading Room
- Montefiore Medical Center
- St. Peter's Church, Chapel and Cemetery Complex
- Westchester Creek
