= Zerega Avenue station =

New York City Subway station in the Bronx

Zerega Avenue
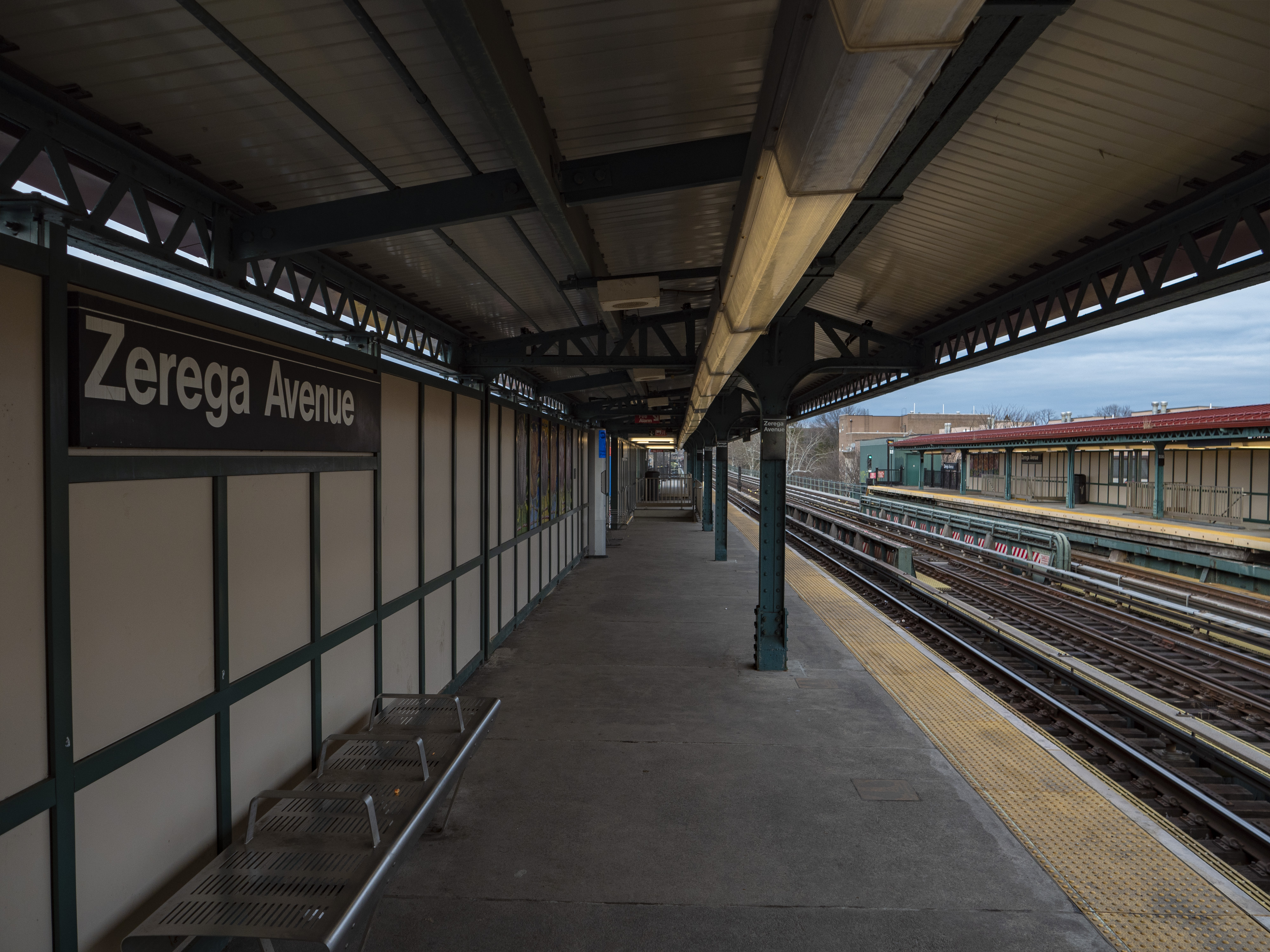
- View of southbound platform

Station statistics
- Address: Zerega Avenue and Westchester Avenue; Bronx, New York
- Borough: The Bronx
- Locale: Westchester Square
- Coordinates: 40.836769°N 73.846793°W
- Division: A (IRT)
- Line: IRT Pelham Line
- Services: 6 (all times except weekdays until 8:45 p.m., peak direction) <6> (weekdays until 8:45 p.m., peak direction)
- Transit: NYCT Bus: Bx4
- Structure: Elevated
- Platforms: 2 side platforms
- Tracks: 3 (2 in regular service)

Other information
- Opened: October 24, 1920; 106 years ago
- Rebuilt: July 5, 2014; 12 years ago to April 27, 2015; 11 years ago

Traffic
- 2025: 505,384 ▲4%
- Rank: 395 out of 423
Services
Preceding station	New York City Subway	Following station
Westchester Square–East Tremont Avenue 6 <6> toward Pelham Bay Park	Local	Castle Hill Avenue 6 <6> toward Brooklyn Bridge–City Hall
Location
Location within New York City Subway
Location within New York City
Location within New York
Track layout
Street map
Station service legend
Symbol	Description
Stops all times except rush hours in the peak direction	Stops all times except rush hours in the peak direction
Stops rush hours in the peak direction only	Stops rush hours in the peak direction only

The Zerega Avenue station is a local station on the IRT Pelham Line of the New York City Subway. Located at Zerega Avenue and Westchester Avenue in the Westchester Square neighborhood of the Bronx, it is served by the 6 train at all times except weekdays in the peak direction, when the <6> train takes over service.

== History ==
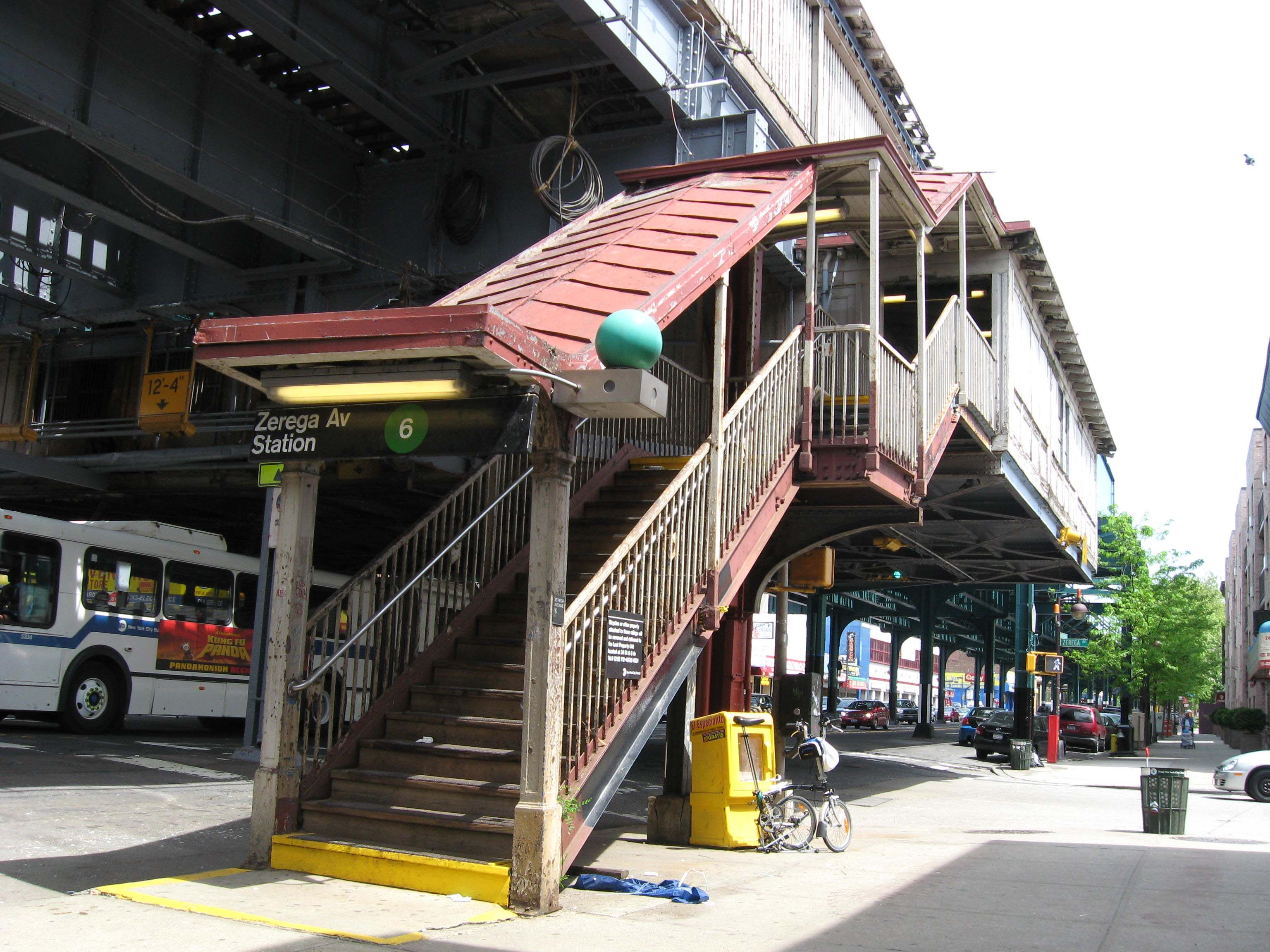
Street stair prior to renovation

This station was built as part of the Pelham Line, which was part of the Dual Contracts, signed on March 19, 1913, and also known as the Dual Subway System. The Pelham Line was proposed to be a branch of the Lexington Avenue Line running northeast via 138th Street, Southern Boulevard and Westchester Avenue to Pelham Bay Park. This station opened on October 24, 1920, with the line's extension from East 177th Street to Westchester Square. Service was initially served by a mix of through and shuttle trains during the 1920s.

From July 5, 2014, to April 27, 2015, as part of a $109 million rebuilding project at five Pelham Line stations, this station, along with Buhre Avenue, was closed for station rehabilitation work.

== Station layout ==
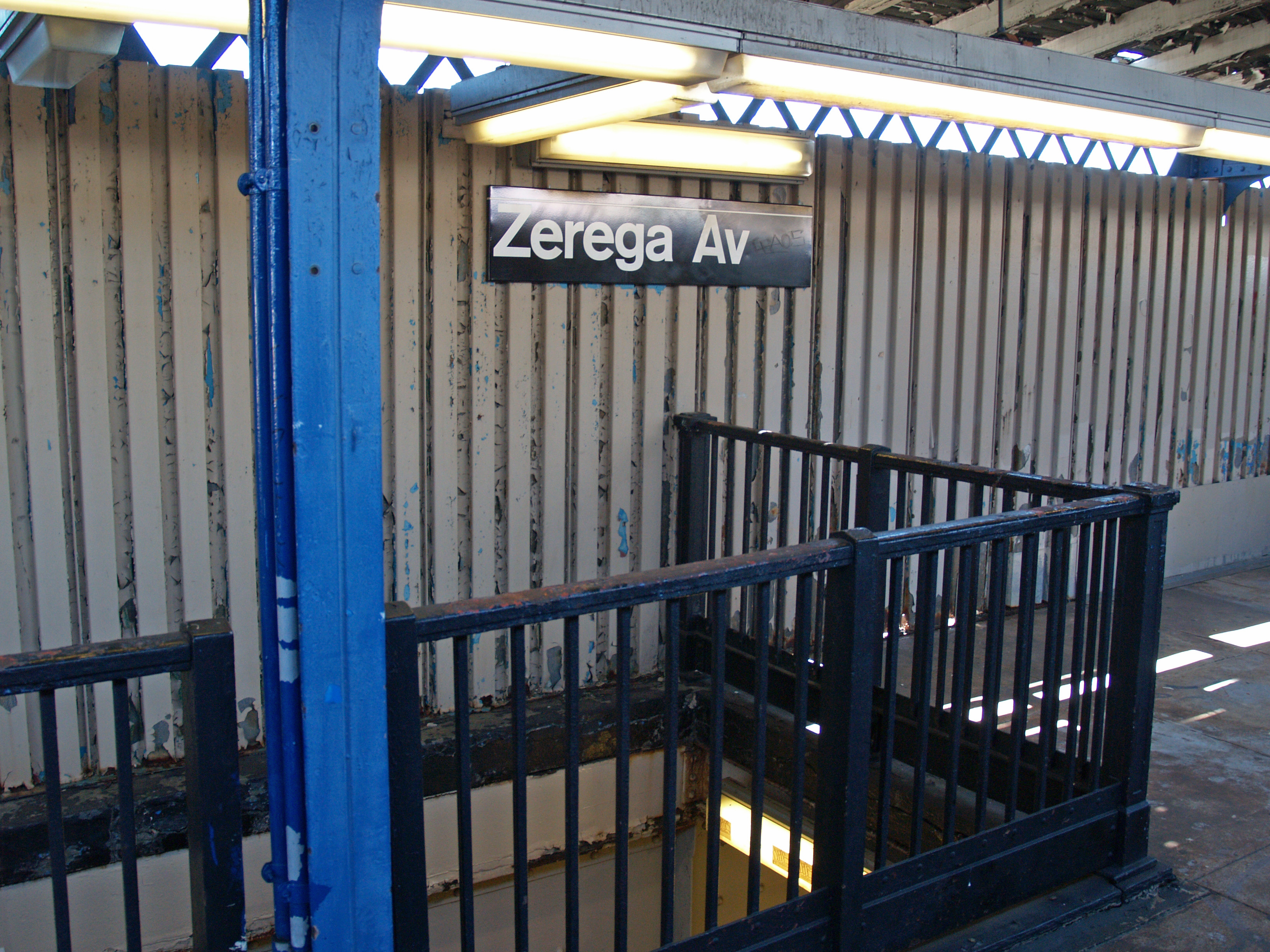
Station sign and windscreen, also prior to renovation

This elevated station has three tracks and two side platforms. The center track is not used in regular service. The 6 local train serves the station at all times except rush hours in the peak direction, when the <6> express train serves the station instead. The next stop to the south is Castle Hill Avenue, while the next stop to the north is Westchester Square–East Tremont Avenue.

It resembles other elevated stations along the line: it has wood mezzanines and no windscreens along the platform edges.

=== Exits ===
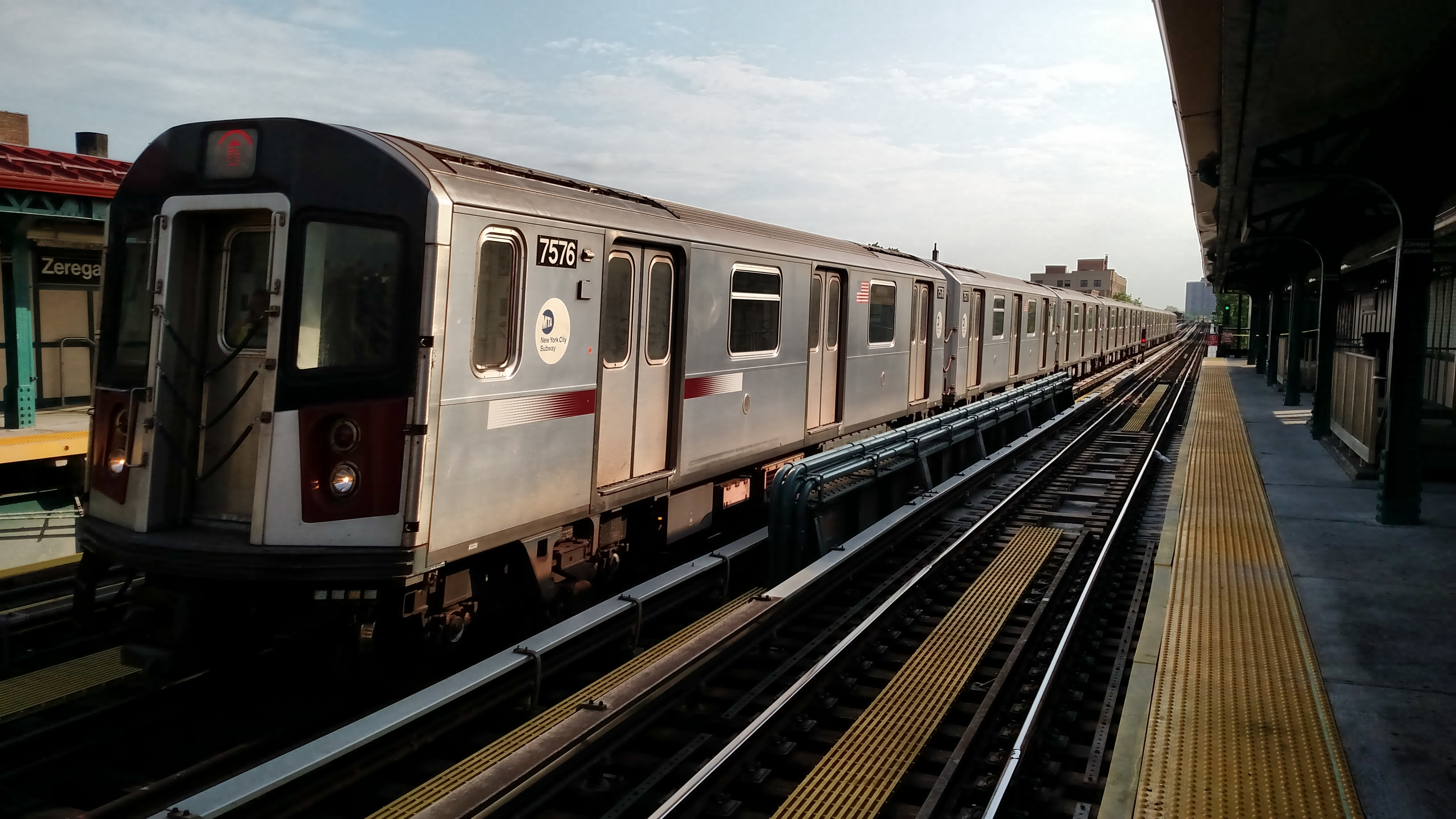
R142A 6 train passing the station

The station's only exit is a mezzanine beneath the tracks. Outside fare control, stairs lead to the northeast and southwest corners of Westchester Avenue and Zerega Avenue.
