= Elder Avenue station =

New York City Subway station in the Bronx

Elder Avenue
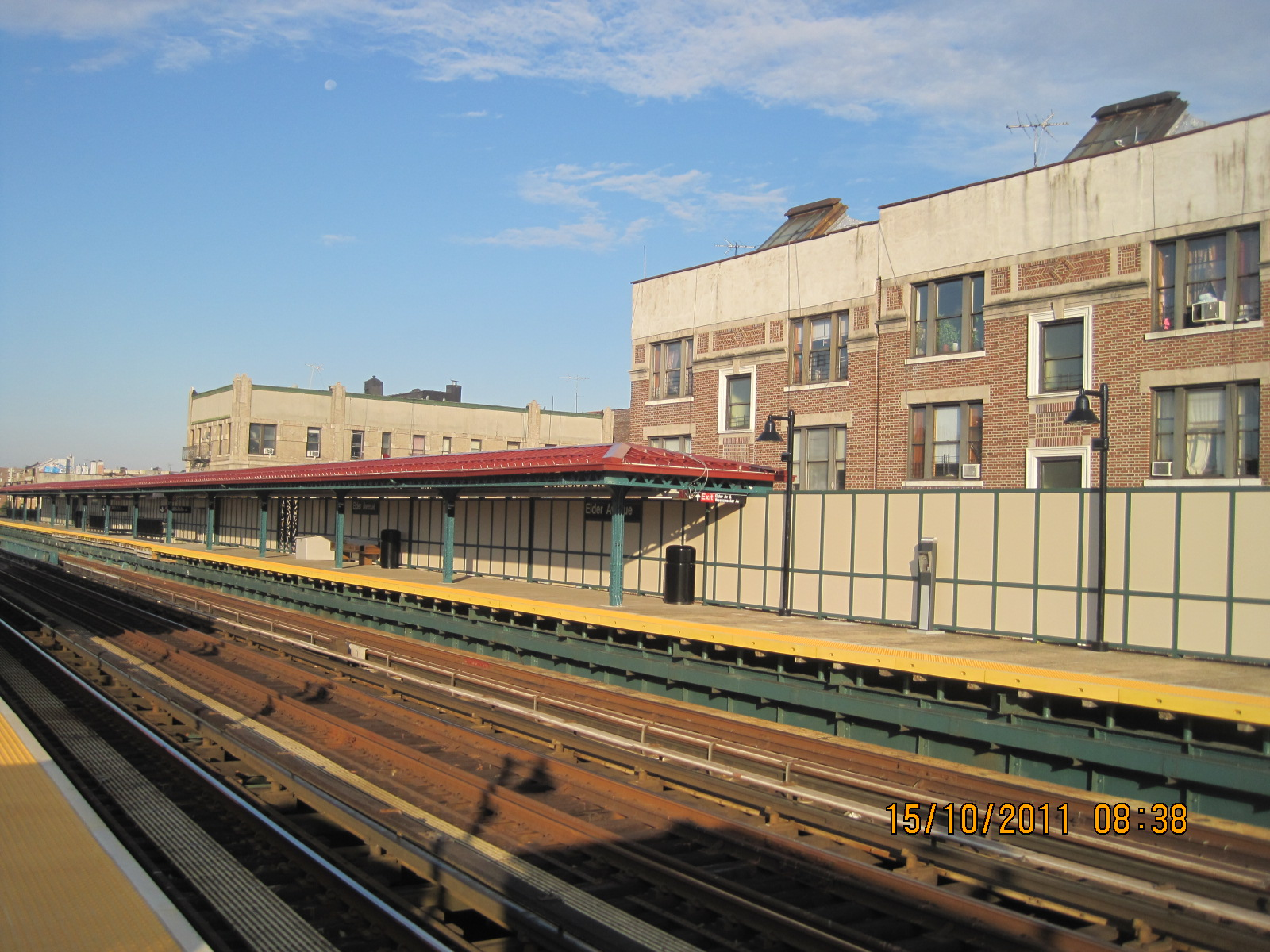
- Station after renovations in 2011

Station statistics
- Address: Elder Avenue and Westchester Avenue; Bronx, New York
- Borough: The Bronx
- Locale: Soundview
- Coordinates: 40.828553°N 73.879194°W
- Division: A (IRT)
- Line: IRT Pelham Line
- Services: 6 (all times)
- Transit: NYCT Bus: Bx4, Bx4A, Bx27
- Structure: Elevated
- Platforms: 2 side platforms
- Tracks: 3

Other information
- Opened: May 30, 1920; 106 years ago
- Rebuilt: February 28, 2011; 15 years ago to October 16, 2011; 15 years ago
- Accessible: No; planned

Traffic
- 2025: 1,390,347 ▲22.4%
- Rank: 242 out of 423
Services
Preceding station	New York City Subway	Following station
Morrison Avenue–Soundview toward Pelham Bay Park	Local	Whitlock Avenue toward Brooklyn Bridge–City Hall
does not stop here
Location
Location within New York City Subway
Location within New York City
Location within New York
Track layout
Street map
Station service legend
Symbol	Description
Stops all times	Stops all times

The Elder Avenue station is a local station on the IRT Pelham Line of the New York City Subway. Located at the intersection of Elder Avenue and Westchester Avenue in the Soundview neighborhood of the Bronx, it is served by the 6 train at all times. The <6> train skips this station when it operates.

== History ==
Elder Avenue station opened on May 30, 1920, as the Pelham Line was extended to East 177th Street from Hunts Point Avenue. The construction of the Pelham Line was part of the Dual Contracts, signed on March 19, 1913, and also known as the Dual Subway System. The Pelham Line was built as a branch of the Lexington Avenue Line running northeast via 138th Street, Southern Boulevard and Westchester Avenue. Initially, the extension was served by a shuttle service operating with elevated cars. Passengers transferred to the shuttle at Hunts Point Avenue. As part of its 2025–2029 Capital Program, the MTA has proposed making the station wheelchair-accessible in compliance with the Americans with Disabilities Act of 1990.

== Station layout ==
This elevated station has three tracks and two side platforms. The center track is used by the weekday peak direction <6> express service. The 6 local train serves the station at all times. The next stop to the south is Whitlock Avenue, while the next stop to the north is Morrison Avenue–Soundview. Both platforms have beige windscreens and red canopies with green frames and support columns at the center and black waist-high steel fences at either ends. The station name plates are in the standard black with white lettering that covered up the original IRT style mosaic signs.

=== Exits ===
The station's only entrance/exit is an elevated station house beneath the tracks. Inside the turnstile bank, there are two staircases to each platform at the center and a waiting area that allows a free transfer between directions. Outside fare control, there is a token booth and two staircases going down to the southwest and northeast corner of Elder and Westchester Avenues.
