= St. Lawrence Avenue station =

New York City Subway station in the Bronx

St. Lawrence Avenue
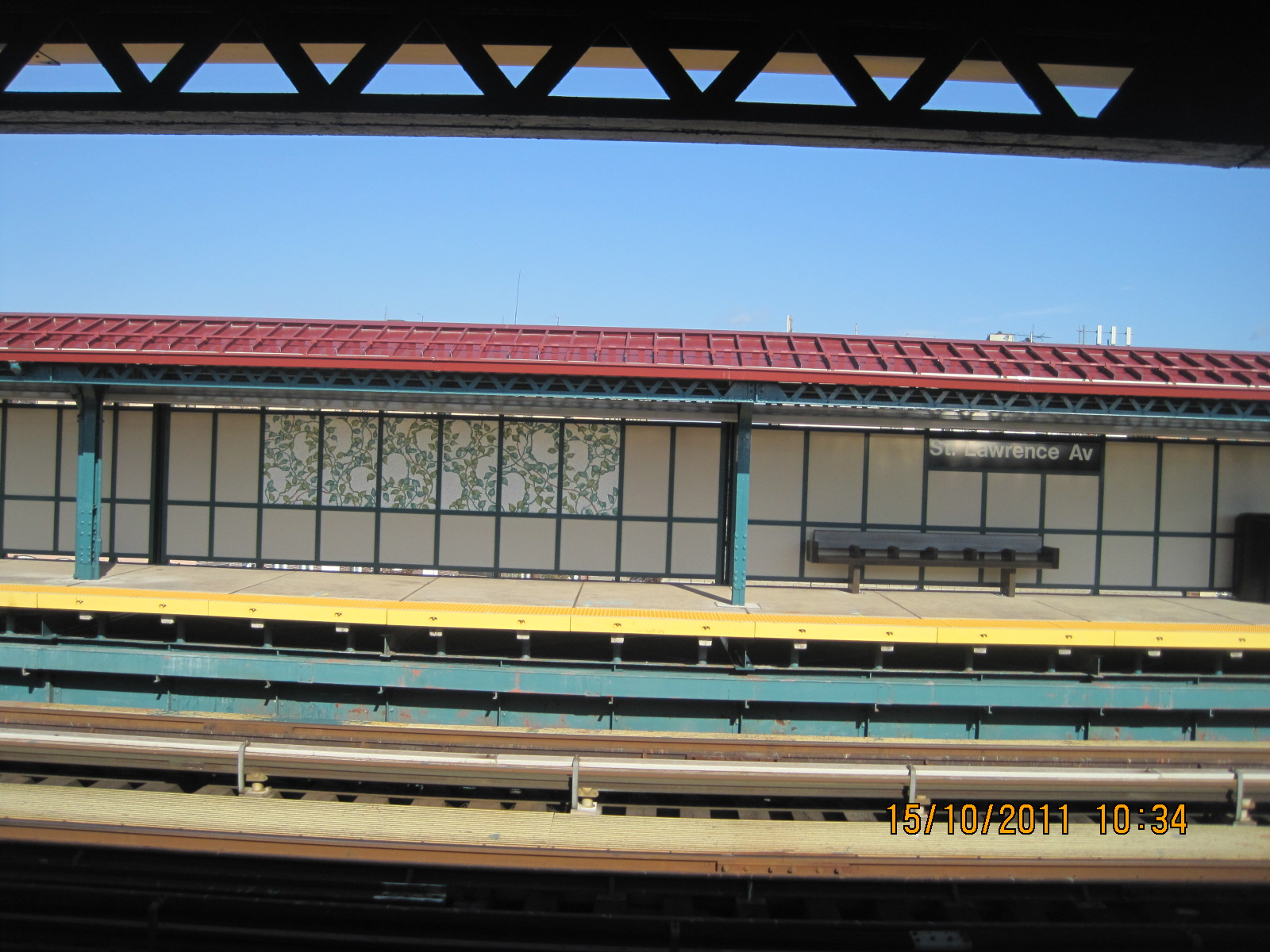

Station statistics
- Address: St. Lawrence Avenue and Westchester Avenue; Bronx, New York
- Borough: The Bronx
- Locale: Soundview
- Coordinates: 40.831573°N 73.867307°W
- Division: A (IRT)
- Line: IRT Pelham Line
- Services: 6 (all times)
- Transit: NYCT Bus: Bx4, Bx4A
- Structure: Elevated
- Platforms: 2 side platforms
- Tracks: 3

Other information
- Opened: May 30, 1920; 106 years ago
- Rebuilt: February 28, 2011; 15 years ago to October 16, 2011; 15 years ago

Traffic
- 2025: 926,380 ▲23.9%
- Rank: 327 out of 423
Services
Preceding station	New York City Subway	Following station
Parkchester toward Pelham Bay Park	Local	Morrison Avenue–Soundview toward Brooklyn Bridge–City Hall
does not stop here
Location
Location within New York City Subway
Location within New York City
Location within New York
Track layout
Street map
Station service legend
Symbol	Description
Stops all times	Stops all times

The St. Lawrence Avenue station is a local station on the IRT Pelham Line of the New York City Subway. Located at the intersection of St. Lawrence Avenue and Westchester Avenue in the Soundview neighborhood of the Bronx, it is served by the 6 train at all times. The <6> train skips this station when it operates.

== History ==
St. Lawrence Avenue station opened on May 30, 1920 as the Pelham Line was extended to East 177th Street from Hunts Point Avenue. The construction of the Pelham Line was part of the Dual Contracts, signed on March 19, 1913 and also known as the Dual Subway System. The Pelham Line was built as a branch of the Lexington Avenue Line running northeast via 138th Street, Southern Boulevard and Westchester Avenue. Initially, the extension was served by a shuttle service operating with elevated cars. Passengers transferred to the shuttle at Hunts Point Avenue.

== Station layout ==
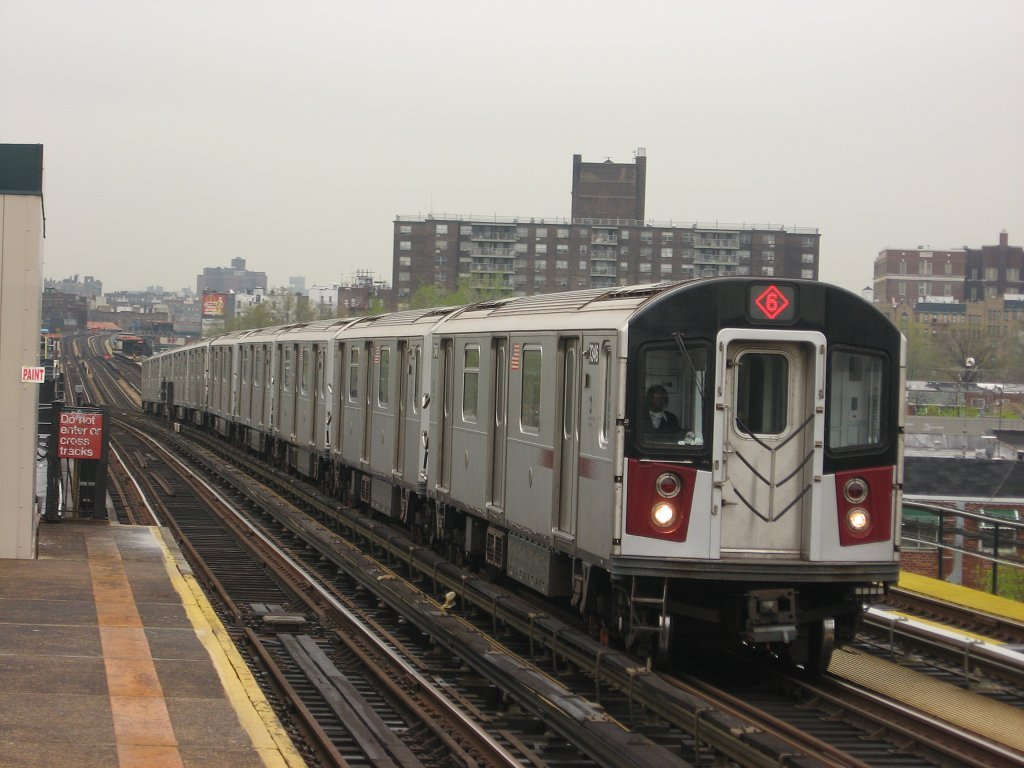
An R142A 6 Express train bypassing the station

The station has three tracks and two side platforms. The center express track is used by the <6> service during weekdays in the peak direction. The 6 local train serves the station at all times. The next stop to the south is Morrison Avenue–Soundview, while the next stop to the north is Parkchester.

The station resembles other elevated stations along the line: it has a wood mezzanine and no windscreens along the platform edges. St. Lawrence Avenue is the northernmost station on the IRT Pelham Line that does not serve rush-hour express service.

=== Exits ===
There is a mezzanine below the east end of the station, which contains the station's only exit. Outside fare control, exit stairs lead to the southwest and northeast corners of Westchester Avenue and St. Lawrence Avenue.
