= Parkchester station =

New York City Subway station in the Bronx

Parkchester
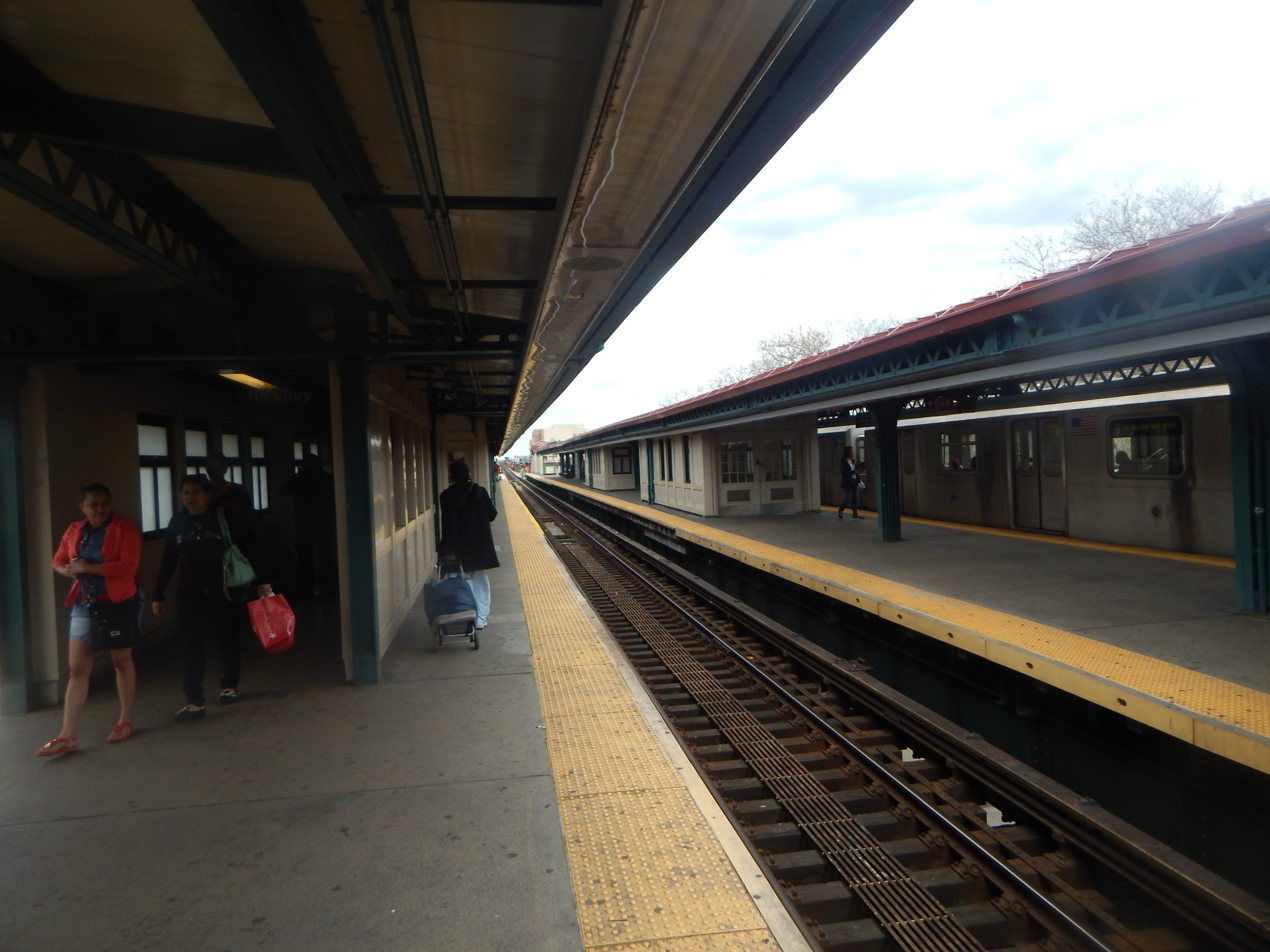

Station statistics
- Address: Hugh J. Grant Circle; Bronx, New York
- Borough: The Bronx
- Locale: Parkchester, Castle Hill
- Coordinates: 40°50′0″N 73°51′39.5″W
- Division: A (IRT)
- Line: IRT Pelham Line
- Services: 6 (all times) <6> (weekdays until 8:45 p.m., peak direction)
- Transit: NYCT Bus: Bx4, Bx4A, Bx11, Bx36, Bx39, Q44 SBS Metro-North: New Haven Line (at Parkchester/Van Nest) (proposed, future); MTA Bus: BxM6
- Structure: Elevated
- Platforms: 2 island platforms cross-platform interchange
- Tracks: 3

Other information
- Opened: May 30, 1920; 106 years ago
- Accessible: Yes
- Former/other names: Parkchester–East 177th Street; East 177th Street–Parkchester; East 177th Street

Traffic
- 2025: 2,760,647 ▼0.4%
- Rank: 139 out of 423
Services
Preceding station	New York City Subway	Following station
Castle Hill Avenue 6 <6> toward Pelham Bay Park	Express	Hunts Point Avenue <6> toward Brooklyn Bridge–City Hall
Castle Hill Avenue 6 <6> toward Pelham Bay Park	Local	St. Lawrence Avenue 6 toward Brooklyn Bridge–City Hall
Non-revenue services and lines
Preceding station	New York City Subway	Following station
Pelham Bay Park express	no service	
Location
Location within New York City Subway
Location within New York City
Location within New York
Track layout
Street map
Station service legend
Symbol	Description
Stops all times except rush hours in the peak direction	Stops all times except rush hours in the peak direction
Stops all times	Stops all times
Stops rush hours in the peak direction only	Stops rush hours in the peak direction only

The Parkchester station (announced as Parkchester–East 177th Street on NTT trains) is an express station on the IRT Pelham Line of the New York City Subway. It is located above Hugh J. Grant Circle in the Parkchester and Castle Hill neighborhoods of the Bronx, where East 177th Street (the Cross Bronx Expressway service road), Metropolitan Avenue, and Westchester Avenue intersect. The station is served by the 6 train at all times and the <6> train during weekdays in the peak direction.

By passenger count, Parkchester was the third-busiest station in the Bronx in 2017, behind 161st Street–Yankee Stadium and Third Avenue–149th Street, and the busiest station on the Pelham Line.

== History ==
=== Background ===
In 1913, New York City, the Brooklyn Rapid Transit Company, and the Interborough Rapid Transit Company (IRT) reached an agreement, known as the Dual Contracts, to dramatically expand subway service across the City. The portion of the agreement between New York City and the IRT was known as Contract 3. As part of this contract, the IRT agreed to construct a branch of the original subway, which opened in 1904, north along Lexington Avenue with branches along Jerome Avenue and a three-track branch running northeast via 138th Street, Southern Boulevard and Westchester Avenue to Pelham Bay Park.

The construction of the Lexington Avenue Line, in conjunction with the construction of the Broadway–Seventh Avenue Line would change the operations of the IRT system. Instead of having trains go via Broadway, turning onto 42nd Street, before finally turning onto Park Avenue, there would be two trunk lines connected by the 42nd Street Shuttle. The system would be changed from looking like a "Z" system on a map to an "H" system. One trunk would run via the new Lexington Avenue Line down Park Avenue, and the other trunk would run via the new Seventh Avenue Line up Broadway.

=== Opening ===
On August 1, 1918, the first portion of the Pelham Line opened as a branch of the Lexington Avenue Line, with the extension of Lexington Avenue local service to Third Avenue–138th Street; the line was extended to the Hunts Point Avenue station the next year. The extension was originally supposed to be finished by the end of 1918, but due to the difficulty in acquiring materials, the opening was delayed. In January 1919, the New York State Public Service Commission was looking into acquiring property for a subway yard at Pelham Bay Park. On May 30, 1920, the Pelham Line was extended to Parkchester–East 177th Street, with the extension being served by a shuttle service operating with elevated cars. Passengers transferred to the shuttle at Hunts Point Avenue.

Express service on the Pelham Line between East 177th Street and Third Avenue–138th Street was inaugurated on October 14, 1946. Express trains ran during weekday rush hours and on Saturday morning in the peak direction. This express service saved eight minutes between Third Avenue and East 177th Street. During this time, 6 trains that ran local in the Bronx when express trains operated terminated at East 177th Street to make room for express trains to Pelham Bay Park. Express service did not start until this date because of the increase in ridership from the huge Parkchester housing complex at East 177th Street.

This station was rehabilitated in 2010. The northbound platform was partially closed in April 2010 for renovations, followed by the southbound platform that July. The work included new canopies, stairs, lighting, and public intercom systems, as well as refurbished platform floors and structural repairs.

In 2019, as part of an initiative to increase the accessibility of the New York City Subway system, the MTA announced that it would install elevators at the Parkchester station as part of the MTA's 2020–2024 Capital Program. In December 2022, the MTA announced that it would award a $146 million contract for the installation of eight elevators across four stations, including Parkchester. The work included demolition of an existing escalator to make way for an elevator. The elevators opened in January 2026. That October, the MTA announced plans to install taller fare gates with glass panels at 20 additional stations, including the Parkchester station, following a successful pilot program at earlier stations.

== Station layout ==
Parkchester is an express station with three tracks and two island platforms. The 6 stops on the outer local tracks while the <6> stops on the center express track. The 6 train serves the station at all times, and the <6> runs during weekdays in the peak direction. The next stop to the south is Hunts Point Avenue for express trains and St. Lawrence Avenue for local trains, while the next stop to the north is Castle Hill Avenue. There are 1950s-style mushroom-shaped lights at the end of the platforms and the staircases to the mezzanine are sheltered. Just north of the station is a signal tower which was used until the late 1990s, when a new master tower was created in Westchester Yard. Demolition of the old tower began in November 2025.

During weekdays, some 6 local trains terminate at Parkchester. All local trains end their runs at Parkchester during the PM rush hour, when the <6> express operates, while selected local trains terminate there during the AM rush hour and the evening. After discharging passengers on the northbound local track, terminating trains use the center track past switches north of the station as a pocket track to relay.

All trains continuing on the IRT Pelham Line north of this station make all subsequent stops, these stations are only served by the <6> in the peak direction when it is operating, and the 6 at all other times.

=== Exit ===
The station's only exit is a mezzanine in the center of the Hugh Grant Circle, a traffic circle. It has a crossunder and windows in a simulated 12-pane pattern similar to those at Whitlock Avenue. The fare control is at street level and the room features a painting entitled Live The Dream. There is an escalator from fare control to the southbound platform, bypassing the mezzanine.

== Image gallery ==
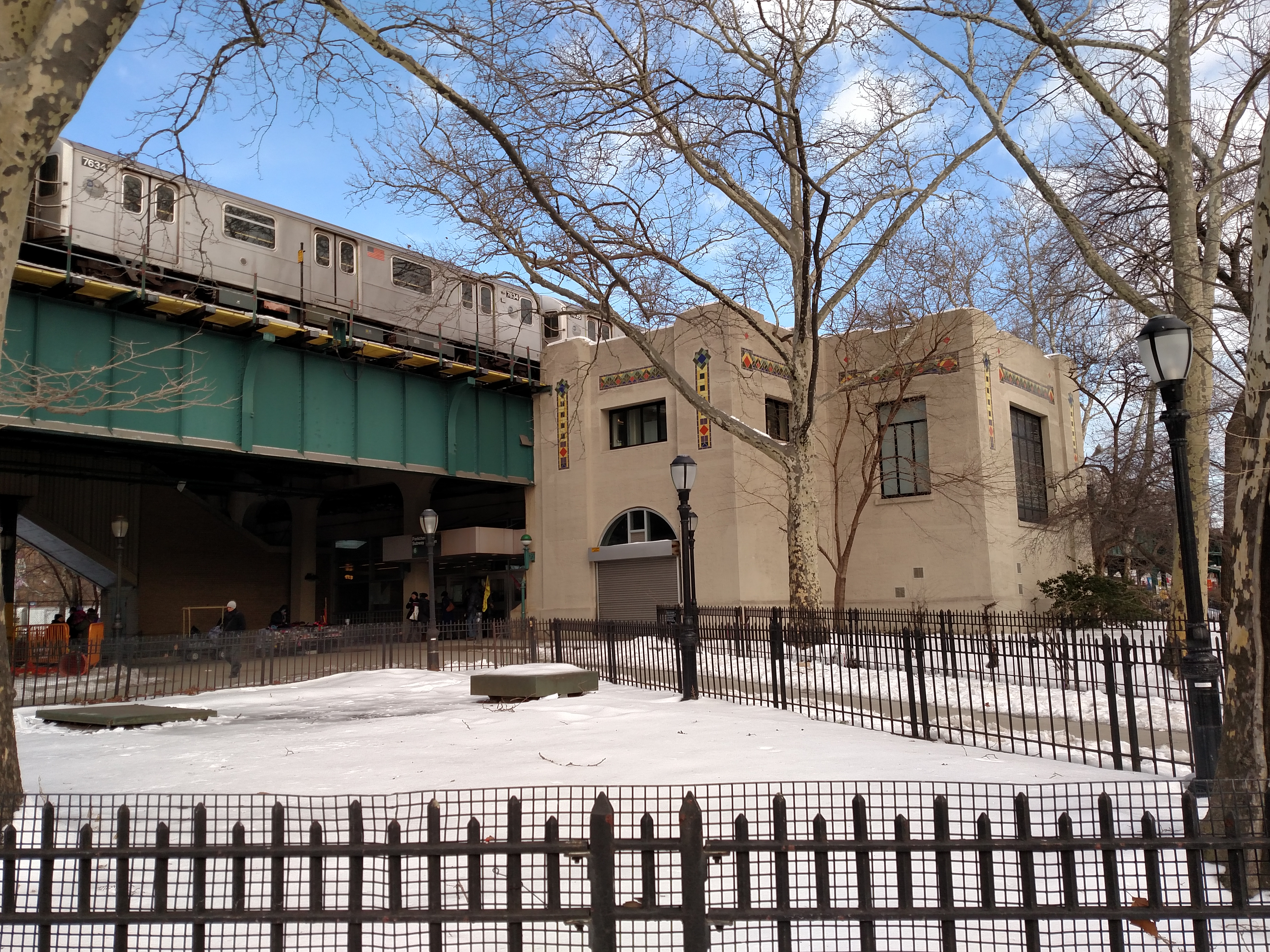
Entrance to Parkchester station

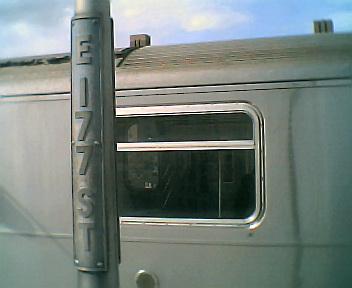
The lampposts at the station, which still read "E 177 ST"

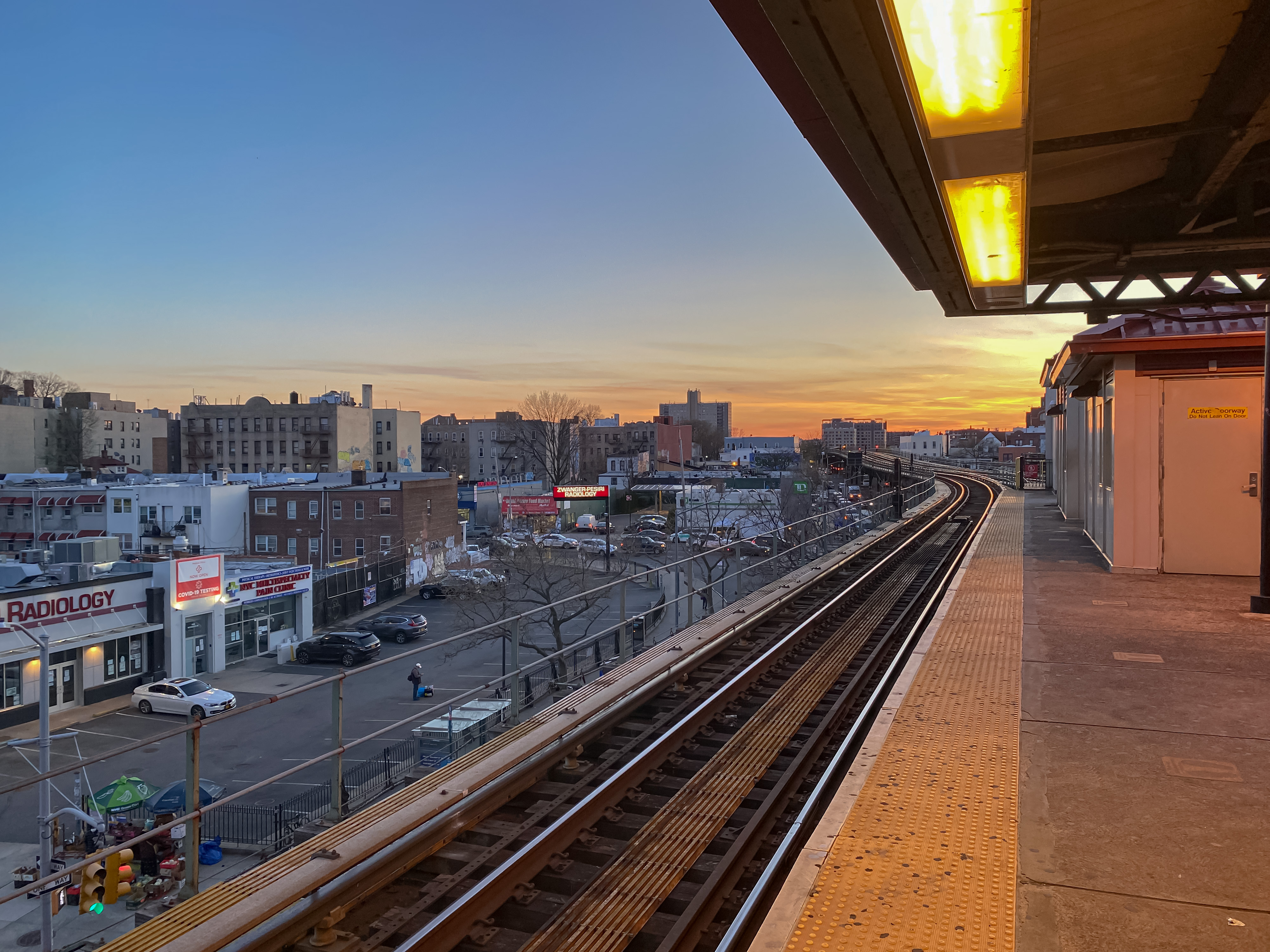
Facing a sunset on the northbound local track

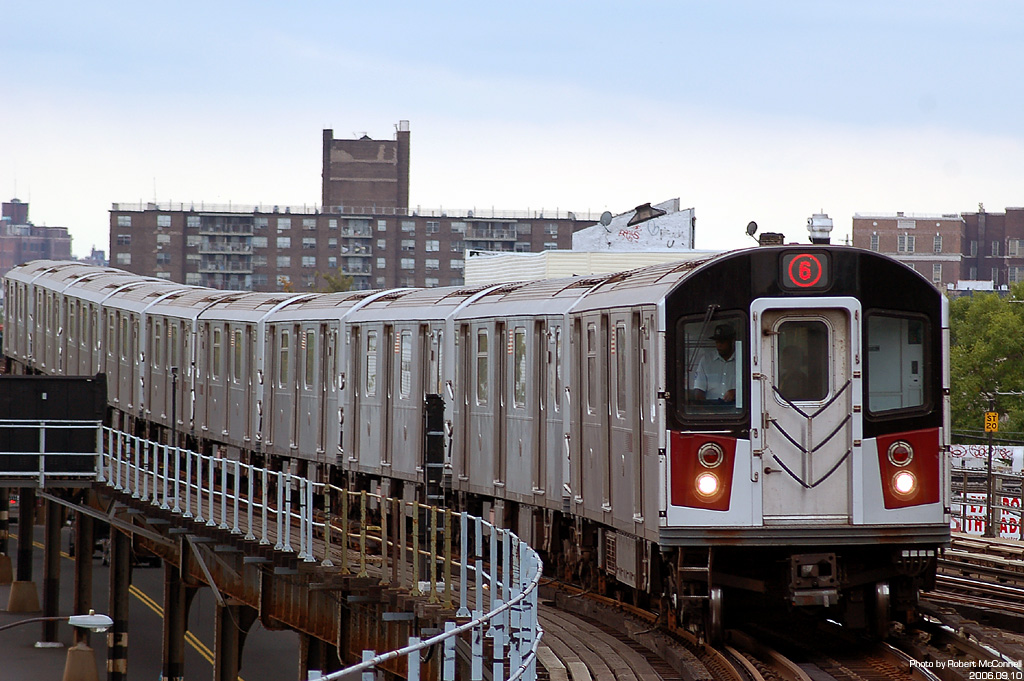
An R142A 6 local train approaching Parkchester
