= Morrison Avenue–Soundview station =

New York City Subway station in the Bronx

Morrison Avenue–Soundview
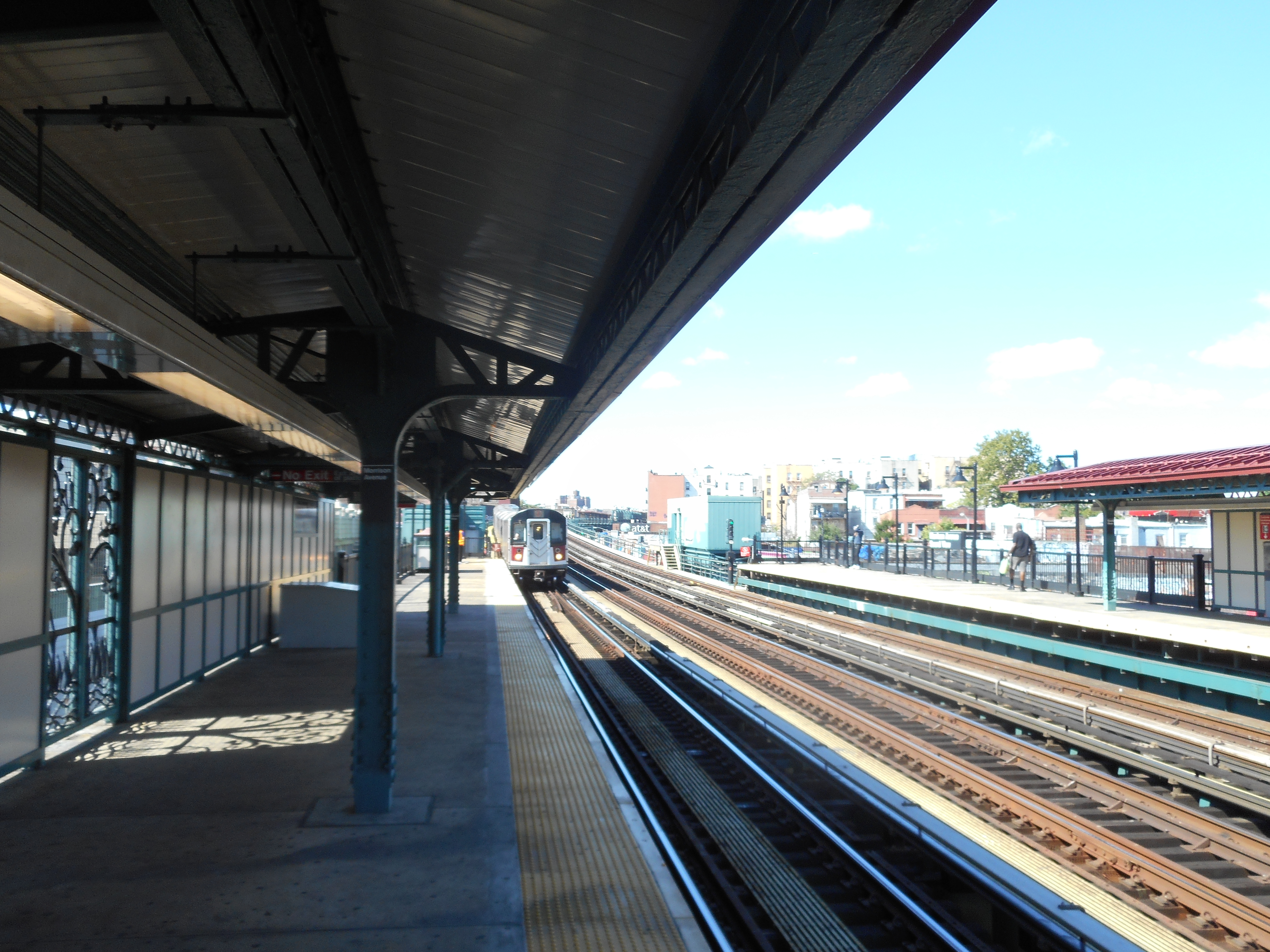
- An R142A 6 train arriving at Morrison Avenue

Station statistics
- Address: Morrison Avenue and Westchester Avenue; Bronx, New York
- Borough: The Bronx
- Locale: Soundview
- Coordinates: 40.829495°N 73.874474°W
- Division: A (IRT)
- Line: IRT Pelham Line
- Services: 6 (all times)
- Transit: NYCT Bus: Bx4, Bx4A, Bx27; NYC Ferry: Soundview (at Soundview Park)
- Structure: Elevated
- Platforms: 2 side platforms
- Tracks: 3

Other information
- Opened: May 30, 1920; 106 years ago
- Rebuilt: February 8, 2010; 16 years ago to September 13, 2010; 16 years ago
- Accessible: No; planned
- Former/other names: Sound View Avenue; Morrison–Sound View Avenues; Morrison Avenue–Sound View Avenue

Traffic
- 2025: 1,326,992 ▲21.6%
- Rank: 254 out of 423
Services
Preceding station	New York City Subway	Following station
St. Lawrence Avenue toward Pelham Bay Park	Local	Elder Avenue toward Brooklyn Bridge–City Hall
does not stop here
Location
Location within New York City Subway
Location within New York City
Location within New York
Track layout
Street map
Station service legend
Symbol	Description
Stops all times	Stops all times

The Morrison Avenue–Soundview station (announced as Morrison-Soundview Avenues on NTT trains) is a local station on the IRT Pelham Line of the New York City Subway. Located at Morrison Avenue and Westchester Avenue in the Soundview neighborhood of the Bronx, it is served by the 6 train at all times. The <6> train skips this station when it operates.

== History ==
The station opened on May 30, 1920 as Sound View Avenue and has also been known as Morrison Avenue–Sound View Avenue and Morrison–Sound View Avenues. The station was opened as the Pelham Line was extended to East 177th Street from Hunts Point Avenue. The construction of the Pelham Line was part of the Dual Contracts, signed on March 19, 1913 and also known as the Dual Subway System. The Pelham Line was built as a branch of the Lexington Avenue Line running northeast via 138th Street, Southern Boulevard and Westchester Avenue. Initially, the extension was served by a shuttle service operating with elevated cars. Passengers transferred to the shuttle at Hunts Point Avenue.

In 1981, the Metropolitan Transportation Authority listed the station among the 69 most deteriorated stations in the subway system.

In 2019, the MTA announced that this station would become ADA-accessible as part of the agency's 2020–2024 Capital Program.

== Station layout ==
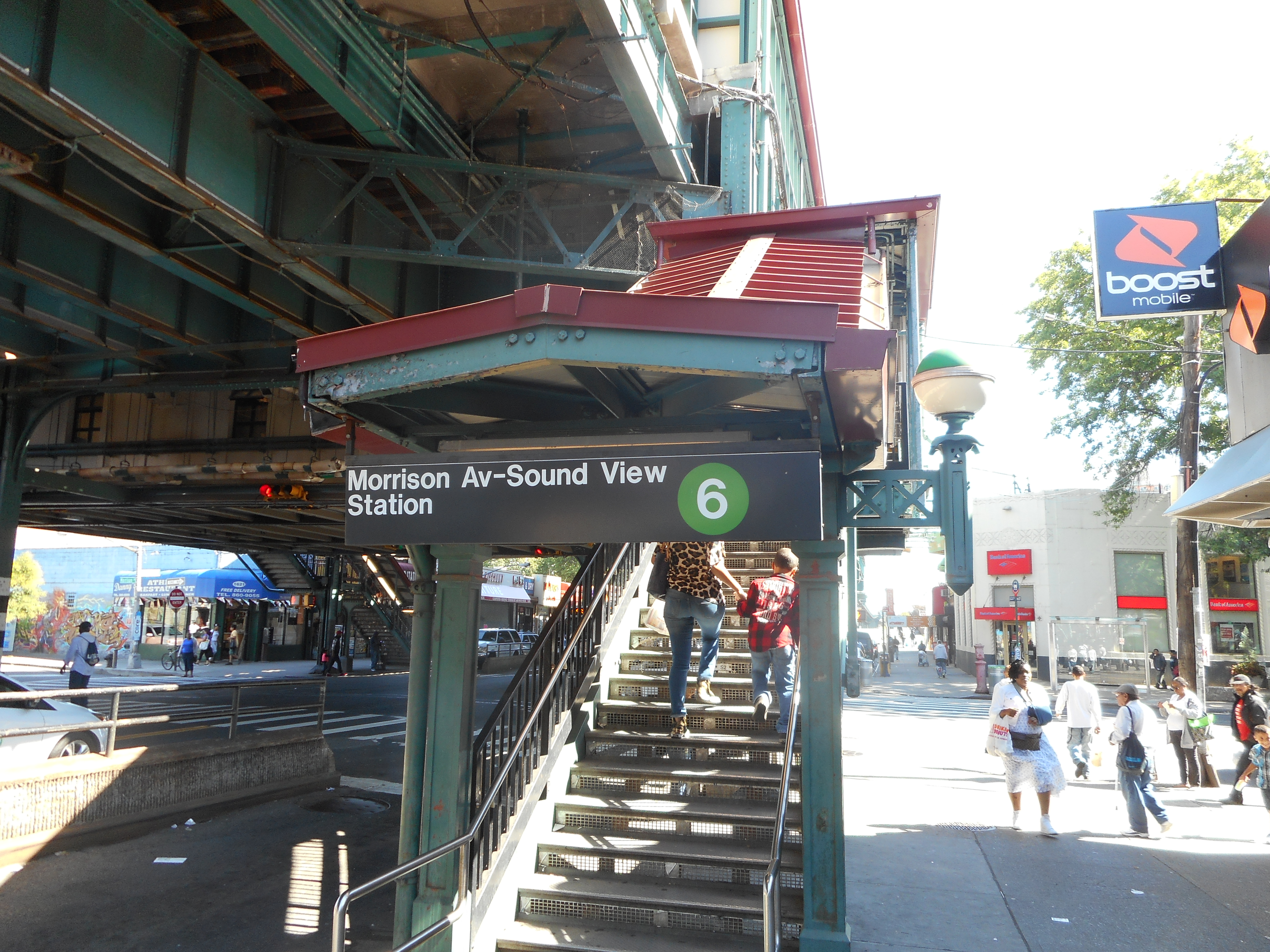
Southwest street entrance

This elevated station has three tracks and two side platforms. The center track is used by the <6> train on weekdays in the peak direction. The 6 local train serves the station at all times. The next stop to the south is Elder Avenue, while the next stop to the north is St. Lawrence Avenue. The platforms have beige windscreen, green canopies, and red roofs in the center and waist-level black steel fence at both ends.

=== Exits ===
Two staircases from each platform lead to the wooden elevated mezzanine beneath the tracks. The station house has a turnstile bank, token booth, and three street staircases to all four corners of Morrison and Westchester Avenues except for the southeast one.
