= Castle Hill Avenue station =

New York City Subway station in the Bronx

Castle Hill Avenue
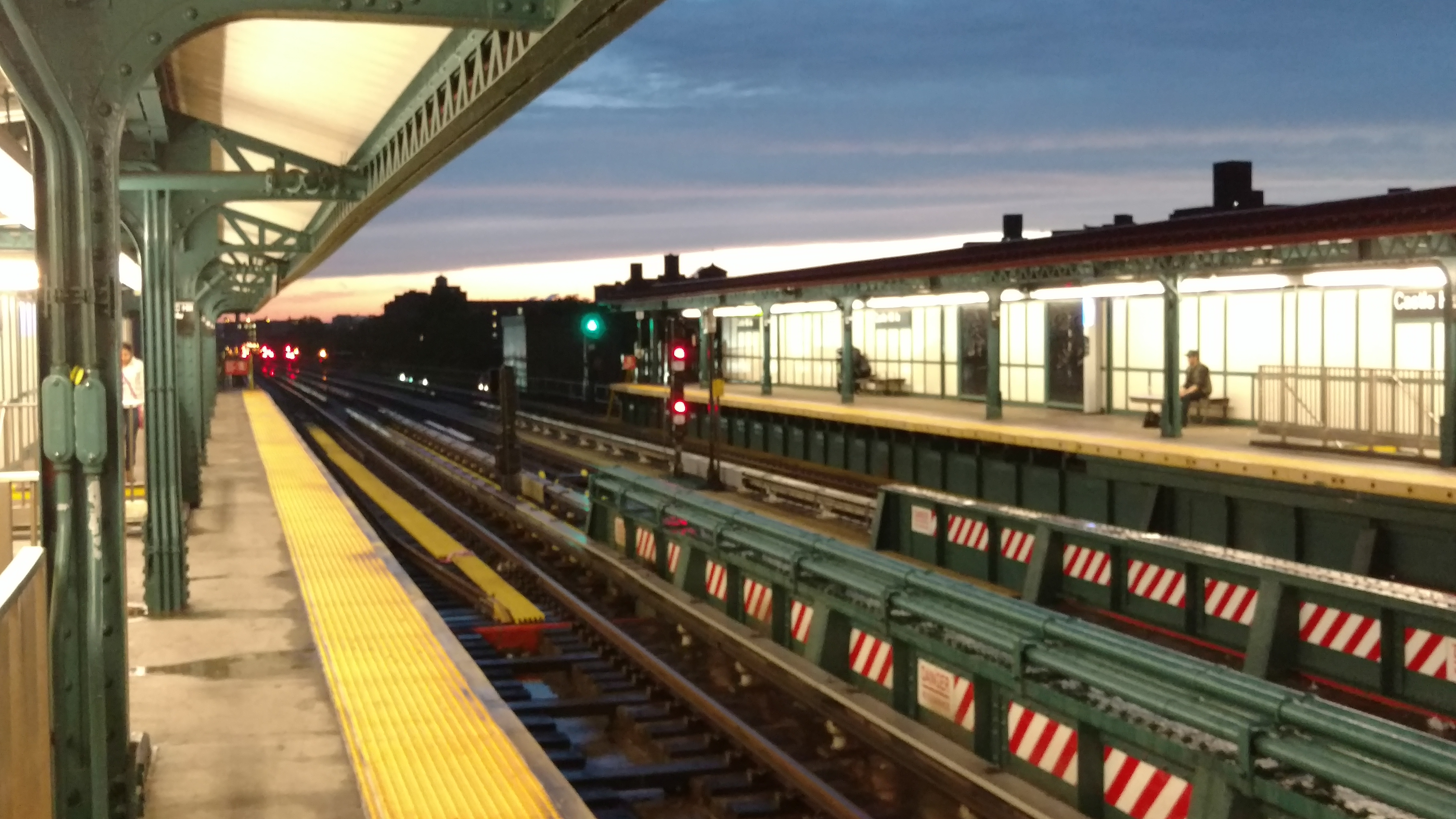
- Platforms

Station statistics
- Address: Castle Hill Avenue and Westchester Avenue; Bronx, New York
- Borough: The Bronx
- Locale: Castle Hill, Westchester Square, Parkchester
- Coordinates: 40.834139°N 73.851686°W
- Division: A (IRT)
- Line: IRT Pelham Line
- Services: 6 (all times except weekdays until 8:45 p.m., peak direction) <6> (weekdays until 8:45 p.m., peak direction)
- Transit: NYCT Bus: Bx4, Bx22
- Structure: Elevated
- Platforms: 2 side platforms
- Tracks: 3 (2 in regular service)

Other information
- Opened: October 24, 1920; 106 years ago
- Rebuilt: October 5, 2013; 13 years ago to May 4, 2014; 12 years ago

Traffic
- 2025: 1,279,969 ▲15.7%
- Rank: 263 out of 423
Services
Preceding station	New York City Subway	Following station
Zerega Avenue 6 <6> toward Pelham Bay Park	Local	Parkchester 6 <6> toward Brooklyn Bridge–City Hall
Location
Location within New York City Subway
Location within New York City
Location within New York
Track layout
Street map
Station service legend
Symbol	Description
Stops all times except rush hours in the peak direction	Stops all times except rush hours in the peak direction
Stops rush hours in the peak direction only	Stops rush hours in the peak direction only

The Castle Hill Avenue station is a local station on the IRT Pelham Line of the New York City Subway. Located at the intersection of Castle Hill and Westchester Avenues, in the Castle Hill, Westchester Square, and Parkchester neighborhoods of the Bronx, it is served by the 6 train at all times except weekdays in the peak direction, when the <6> train takes over service.

== Station layout ==
This elevated station has three tracks and two side platforms. The center track is not used in regular service. The 6 local train serves the station at all times except rush hours in the peak direction, when the <6> express train serves the station instead. The next stop to the south is Parkchester, while the next stop to the north is Zerega Avenue. It resembles other elevated stations along the line, with wood mezzanines and no windscreens along the platform edges.

The station is located north of the Castle Hill neighborhood, and the street that the station is named for leads to that neighborhood.

From October 5, 2013, to May 4, 2014, the station was closed for rehabilitation work.

=== Exits ===
The station's only exit is a mezzanine beneath the tracks. Outside fare control, stairs lead to the northeast and southwest corners of Westchester Avenue and Castle Hill Avenue.
