= Whitlock Avenue station =

New York City Subway station in the Bronx

Whitlock Avenue
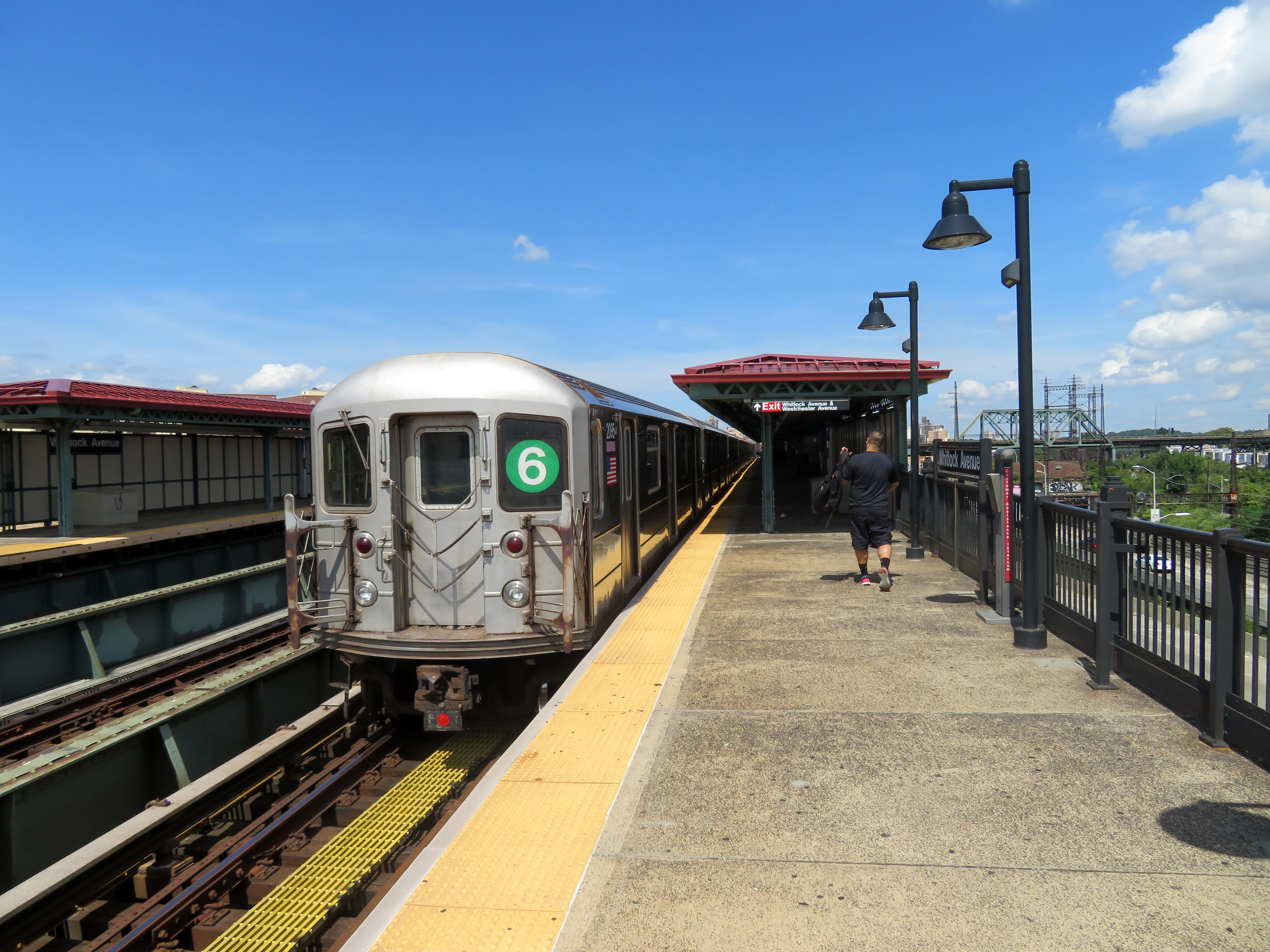
- An uptown 6 train at the station in 2018

Station statistics
- Address: Whitlock Avenue and Westchester Avenue; Bronx, New York
- Borough: The Bronx
- Locale: Foxhurst
- Coordinates: 40.827514°N 73.886147°W
- Division: A (IRT)
- Line: IRT Pelham Line
- Services: 6 (all times)
- Transit: NYCT Bus: Bx4, Bx4A, Bx27
- Structure: Elevated
- Platforms: 2 side platforms
- Tracks: 3

Other information
- Opened: May 30, 1920; 106 years ago
- Rebuilt: February 8, 2010; 16 years ago to September 13, 2010; 16 years ago

Traffic
- 2025: 359,232 ▲6.8%
- Rank: 406 out of 423
Services
Preceding station	New York City Subway	Following station
Elder Avenue toward Pelham Bay Park	Local	Hunts Point Avenue toward Brooklyn Bridge–City Hall
does not stop here
Location
Location within New York City Subway
Location within New York City
Location within New York
Track layout
Street map
Station service legend
Symbol	Description
Stops all times	Stops all times

The Whitlock Avenue station is a local station on the IRT Pelham Line of the New York City Subway. Located at Whitlock Avenue and Westchester Avenue in the Foxhurst neighborhood of the Bronx, it is served by the 6 train at all times. The <6> train skips this station when it operates.

== History ==
The Whitlock Avenue station opened on May 30, 1920, as the Pelham Line was extended to East 177th Street from Hunts Point Avenue. The construction of the Pelham Line was part of the Dual Contracts, signed on March 19, 1913, and also known as the Dual Subway System. The Pelham Line was built as a branch of the Lexington Avenue Line running northeast via 138th Street, Southern Boulevard and Westchester Avenue. Initially, the extension was served by a shuttle service operating with elevated cars. Passengers transferred to the shuttle at Hunts Point Avenue.

== Station layout ==
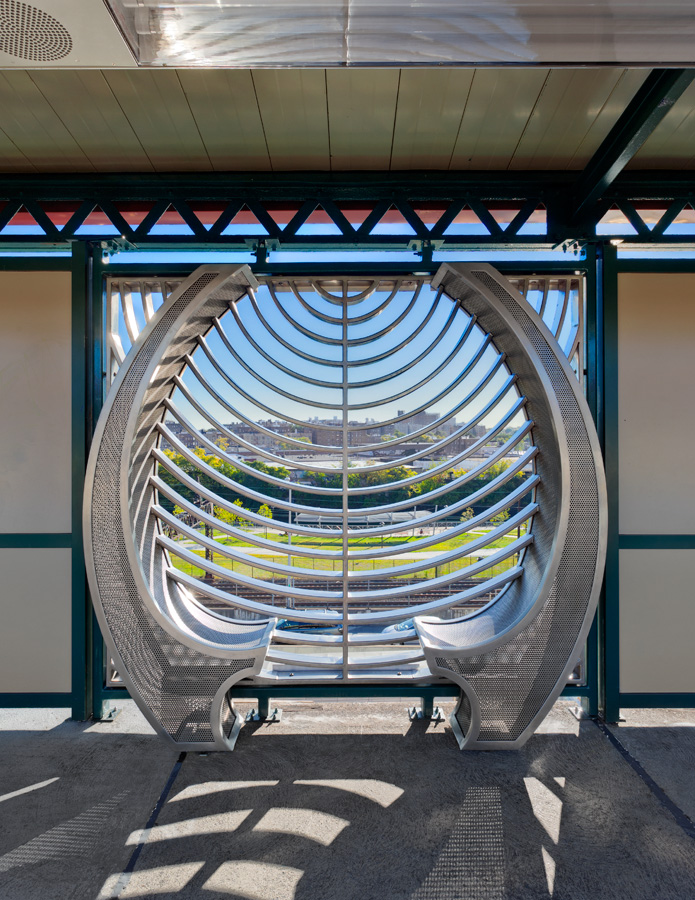
Artwork by Barbara Grygutis

The station has three tracks and two side platforms. The center express track is used by the <6> service during weekdays in the peak direction. The 6 local train serves the station at all times. The next stop to the south is Hunts Point Avenue, while the next stop to the north is Elder Avenue. The station has covered-over old signs and a windscreen on the south end. The north end has a full canopy over the platform.

The station is adjacent to an abandoned railroad station called Westchester Avenue which was served by the New York, Westchester and Boston Railway (NYW&B), and the Harlem River Branch of the New York, New Haven and Hartford Railroad. Currently, the line is used by Amtrak. The former NYW&B line was at one time proposed to be converted into an extension of the IRT Dyre Avenue Line leading to this station, rather than its current terminus at East 180th Street on the IRT White Plains Road Line. The station is also located right next to the Sheridan Expressway.

Southbound, this is the last elevated station before the wholly underground stretch to Brooklyn Bridge station. Northbound, the line makes a right angle turn to the east and crosses the Bronx River via a truss bridge.

=== Exits ===
The mezzanine is wood and features frosted windows in a simulated 16-pane pattern. At one time there were doors to the fare control but they have been removed; doors from fare control to the street remain. Outside fare control, exit stairs lead to either southern corner of Westchester Avenue and Whitlock Avenue.
