= Hunts Point Avenue station =

New York City Subway station in the Bronx

Hunts Point Avenue
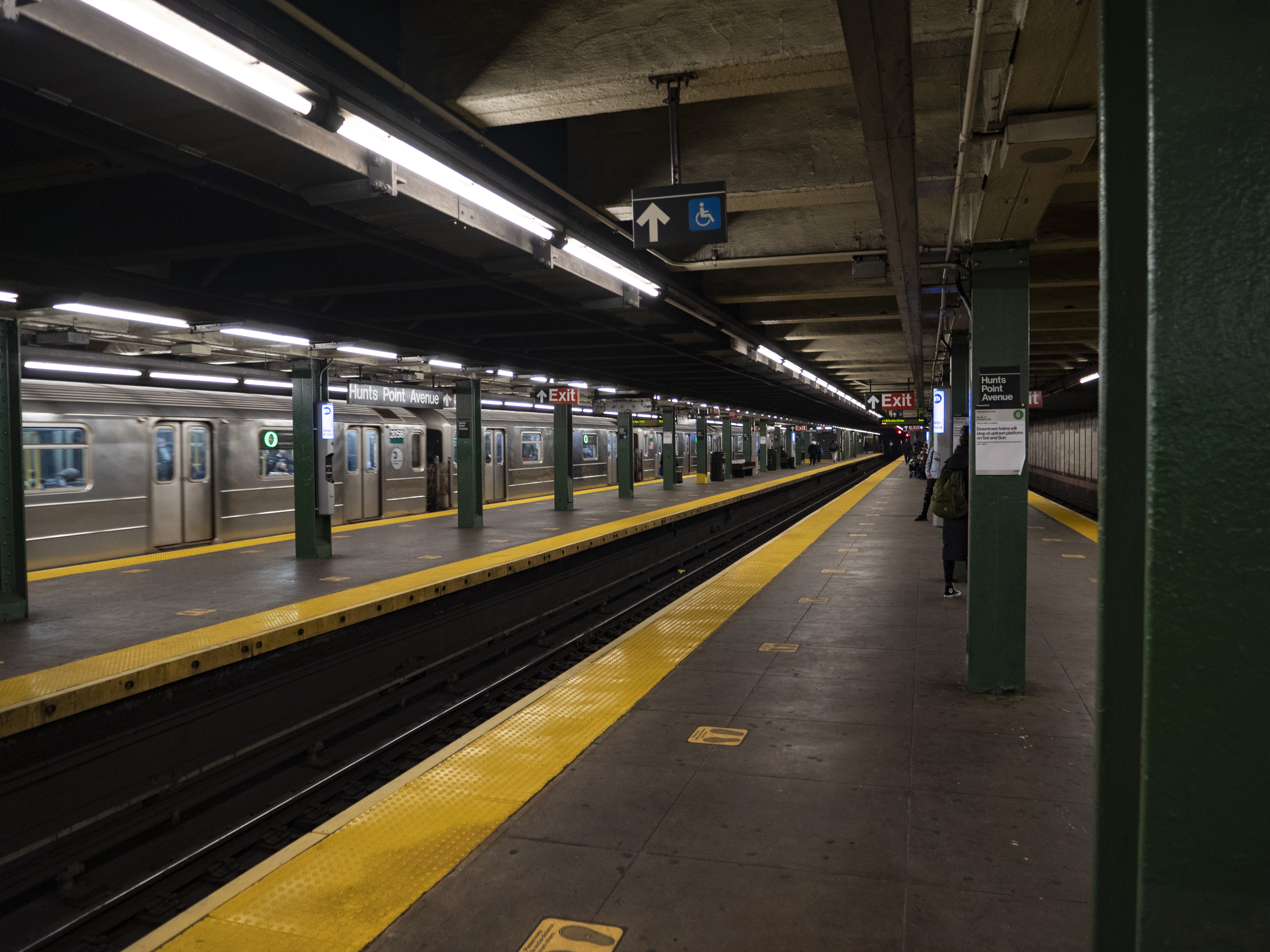
- A northbound R62A 6 train at the station

Station statistics
- Address: Hunts Point Avenue and Southern Boulevard; Bronx, New York
- Borough: The Bronx
- Locale: Longwood,Hunts Point
- Coordinates: 40.820565°N 73.89164°W
- Division: A (IRT)
- Line: IRT Pelham Line
- Services: 6 (all times) <6> (weekdays until 8:45 p.m., peak direction)
- Transit: NYCT Bus: Bx5, Bx6, Bx6 SBS, Bx19
- Structure: Underground
- Platforms: 2 island platforms cross-platform interchange
- Tracks: 3

Other information
- Opened: January 7, 1919; 107 years ago
- Accessible: Yes

Traffic
- 2025: 2,214,032 ▲12.8%
- Rank: 166 out of 423
Services
Preceding station	New York City Subway	Following station
Parkchester <6> toward Pelham Bay Park	Express	Third Avenue–138th Street <6> toward Brooklyn Bridge–City Hall
Whitlock Avenue 6 toward Pelham Bay Park	Local	Longwood Avenue 6 toward Brooklyn Bridge–City Hall
Location
Location within New York City Subway
Location within New York City
Location within New York
Track layout
Street map
Station service legend
Symbol	Description
Stops all times	Stops all times
Stops rush hours in the peak direction only	Stops rush hours in the peak direction only

The Hunts Point Avenue station is an express station on the IRT Pelham Line of the New York City Subway, served by the 6 train at all times and the <6> train on weekdays in the peak direction. It is located at Hunts Point Avenue and Southern Boulevard in the Longwood and Hunts Point neighborhoods of the Bronx.

This station opened in 1919 as part of the Interborough Rapid Transit Company (IRT)'s Pelham Line. The line was constructed as part of an agreement between New York City and two private transit operators to expand transit service across the city known as the Dual Contracts. The station exclusively served local trains until 1946, when rush-hour express service began. The Hunts Point Avenue station was renovated to become compliant with the Americans with Disabilities Act of 1990 in 2014.

== History ==
=== Background ===
In 1913, New York City, the Brooklyn Rapid Transit Company, and the Interborough Rapid Transit Company (IRT) reached an agreement, known as the Dual Contracts, to dramatically expand subway service across the City. The portion of the agreement between New York City and the IRT was known as Contract 3. As part of this contract, the IRT agreed to construct a branch of the original subway, which opened in 1904, north along Lexington Avenue with branches along Jerome Avenue and a three-track branch running northeast via 138th Street, Southern Boulevard and Westchester Avenue to Pelham Bay Park.

The construction of the Lexington Avenue Line, in conjunction with the construction of the Broadway–Seventh Avenue Line would change the operations of the IRT system. Instead of having trains go via Broadway, turning onto 42nd Street, before finally turning onto Park Avenue, there would be two trunk lines connected by the 42nd Street Shuttle. The system would be changed from looking like a "Z" system on a map to an "H" system. One trunk would run via the new Lexington Avenue Line down Park Avenue, and the other trunk would run via the new Seventh Avenue Line up Broadway.

=== Opening ===
On August 1, 1918, the first portion of the Pelham Line opened as a branch of the Lexington Avenue Line, with the extension of Lexington Avenue local service to Third Avenue–138th Street. The Hunts Point Avenue station opened on January 7, 1919, as the new terminal of the Pelham Line, with the extension of the line from Third Avenue–138th Street. The extension was originally supposed to be finished by the end of 1918, but due to the difficulty in acquiring materials, the opening was delayed. In January 1919, the New York State Public Service Commission was looking into acquiring property for a subway yard at Pelham Bay Park. On May 30, 1920, the Pelham Line was extended to East 177th Street, with the extension being served by a shuttle service operating with elevated cars. Passengers transferred to the shuttle at Hunts Point Avenue.

Express service at this station, and on the Pelham Line between East 177th Street and Third Avenue–138th Street, was inaugurated on October 14, 1946. Express trains ran during weekday rush hours and on Saturday morning in the peak direction. This express service saved eight minutes between Third Avenue and East 177th Street. During this time, 6 trains that ran local in the Bronx when express trains operated terminated at East 177th Street to make room for express trains to Pelham Bay Park. Express service did not start until this date because of the increase in ridership from the huge Parkchester housing complex at East 177th Street.

=== Renovations ===
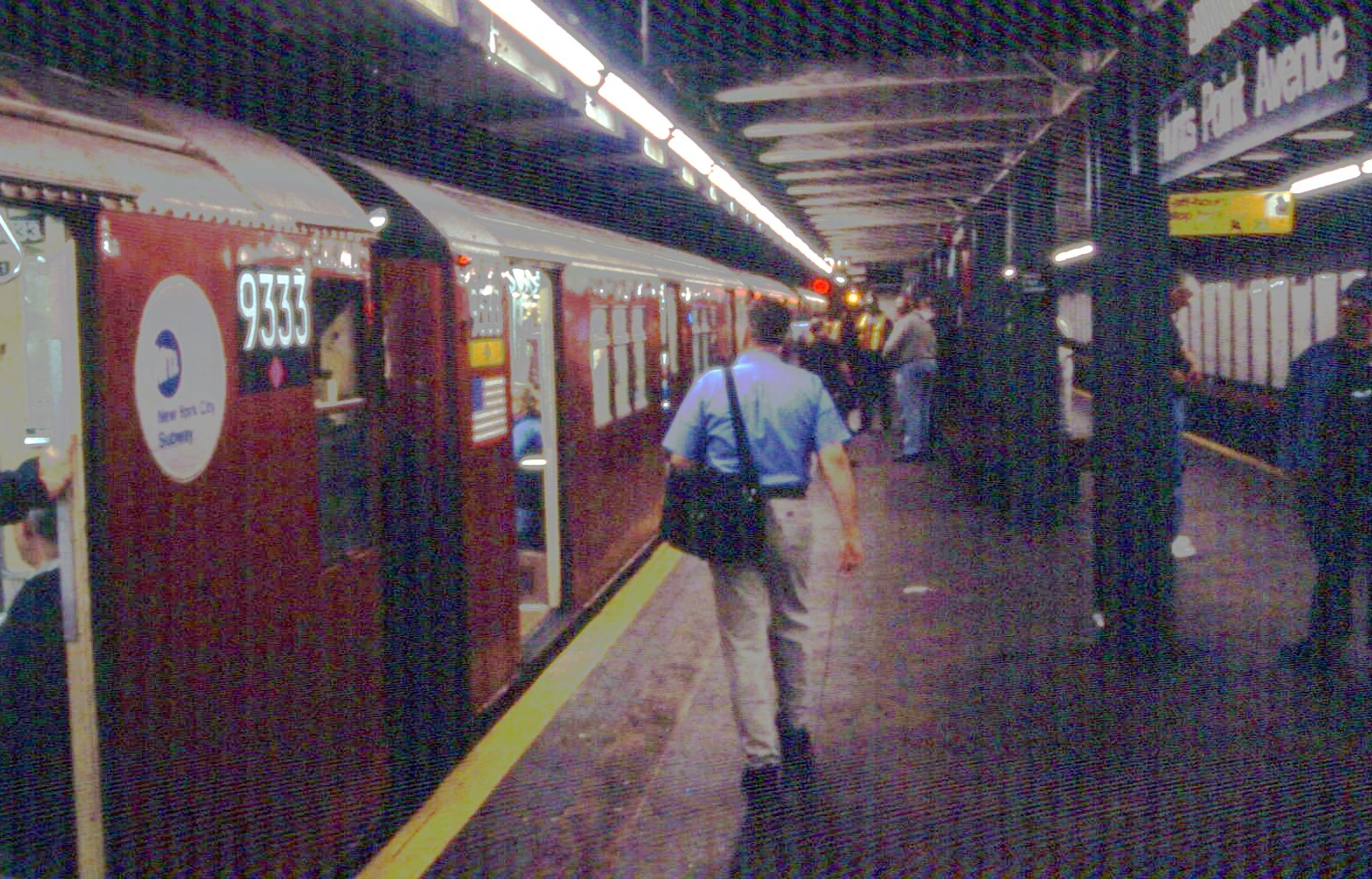
View of the station in 2002

In the early 1960s, the platforms at this station along the Pelham Line were extended to 514 feet (157 m) accommodate 10-car trains. The stations along the line between Hunts Point Avenue and Third Avenue–138th Street, and Third Avenue–149th Street on the IRT White Plains Road Line had their platforms extended under the same contract. Construction of the platform extensions was still underway as of June 1963.

On April 12, 1978, following president Jimmy Carter's visit to the nearly-destroyed Charlotte Street neighborhood nearby, his administration announced that it would allocate $55.6 million to help rehabilitate the blighted South Bronx between then and September 30. Some of this funding was planned to go to the modernization of the Third Avenue–149th Street and Hunts Point Avenue stations. A component of the planned renovations was increased security.

In 1981, the Metropolitan Transportation Authority (MTA) listed the station among the 69 most deteriorated stations in the subway system. On November 18, 2014, a $17.8 million project to make the station compliant with the Americans With Disabilities Act of 1990 was completed, and the reconstructed entrances and fare control area opened to the public. There are three elevators: one from the mezzanine to each platform within fare control, and one from the mezzanine to Monsignor Del Valle Square.

Under the 2015–2019 MTA Capital Program, the station, along with thirty other New York City Subway stations, would have been entirely closed for up to six months to undergo a complete overhaul. Updates would have included cellular service, Wi-Fi, charging stations, improved signage, and improved station lighting. However, these renovations were deferred until the 2020–2024 Capital Program due to a lack of funding.

== Station layout ==
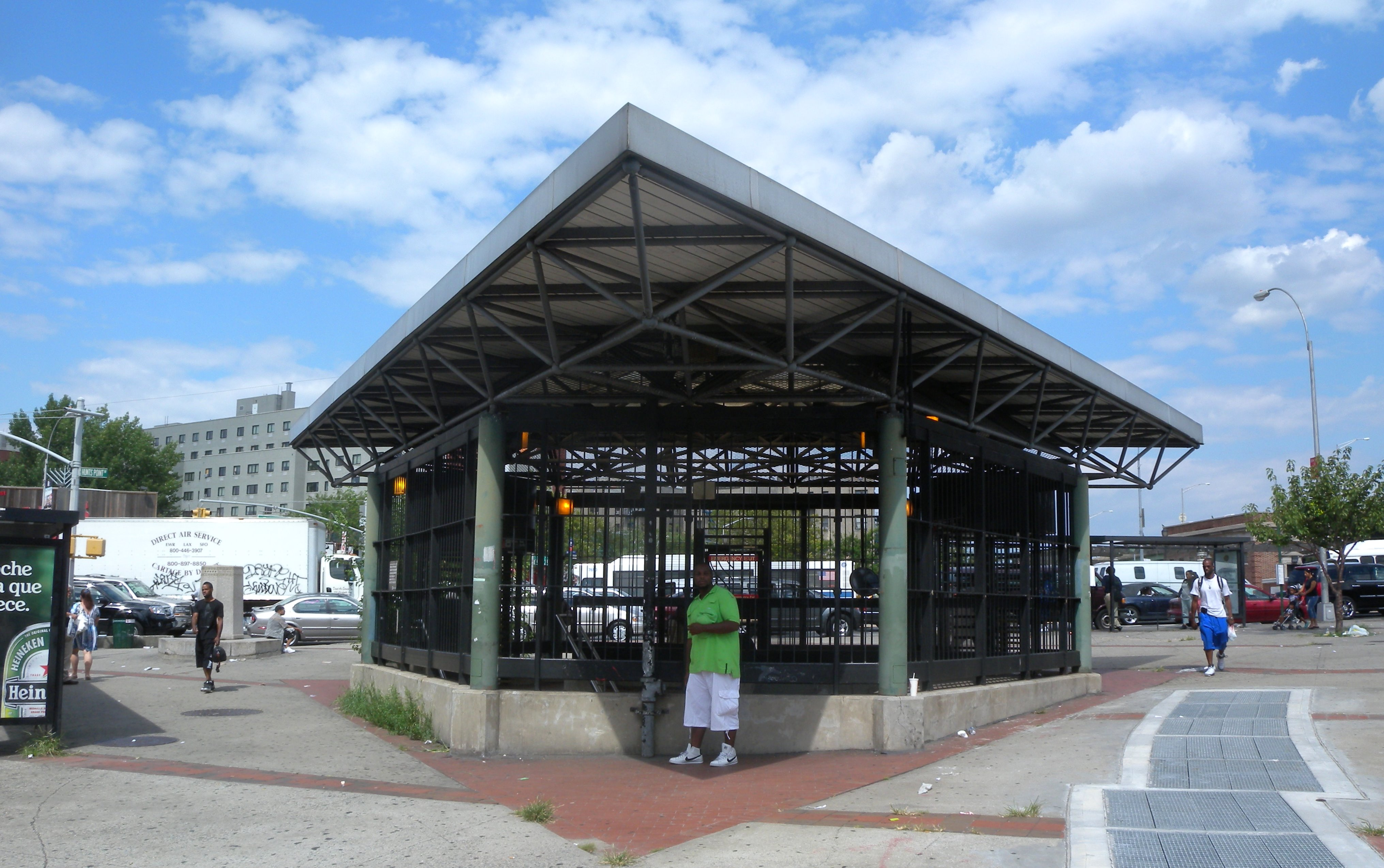
Exit-only station house on Southern Boulevard

This underground station has three tracks and two island platforms. The 6 stops on the outer local tracks at all times, while the <6> stops on the center express track during weekdays in the peak direction. This is the last underground station on the line outbound before the elevated stretch to Pelham Bay Park. The next stop to the south is Longwood Avenue for local trains and Third Avenue–138th Street for express trains. The next stop to the north is Whitlock Avenue for local trains and Parkchester for express trains.

The track walls have geometric Squire Vickers-designed mosaic friezes in muted shades of blue, grey and beige, with occasional sections of pale pink. The large identifying plaques show "H P". Matching "uptown" and "downtown" directional mosaics are found in the mezzanine, along with a smaller, simplified version of the frieze found on the lower level. Dark green I-beam columns run along both platforms at regular intervals, a single line in the middle at their ends and one line on each side at their center.

=== Exits ===
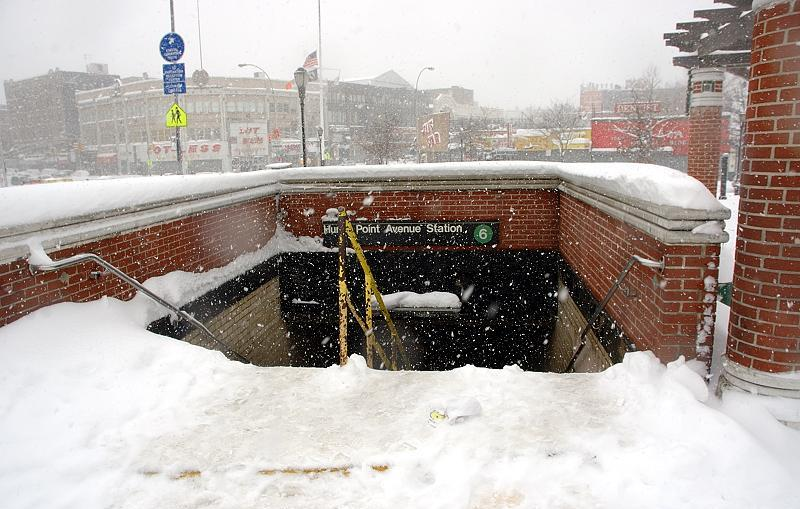
Stairwell entrance into the station from street level, as seen in winter

This station's main fare control area is a mezzanine above the center of the platforms and tracks. Two staircases from each platform go up to a waiting area/crossover, where a turnstile bank provides access to and from the station. Outside fare control, there is a token booth and two street stairs going up to Monsignor Del Valle Square, a city-owned park on the triangle formed by East 163rd Street, Hunts Point Avenue, and Bruckner Boulevard. In a design that is not common in the subway system, the street-level facility, street stair enclosures, and lights are all made of bricks. Although the platform level is lit by fluorescent bulbs, the mezzanine remains lit by incandescent lights, which were replaced along every platform in the subway by the late 1980s.

The northbound platform has an exit-only at its extreme southern end. A twisting staircase goes up to a street-level steel and glass structure, where exit-only turnstiles provide access out of the station. It is located at the southeast corner of Southern Boulevard and Hunts Point Avenue.

== Ridership ==
In 2018, the station had 3,216,569 boardings, making it the 153rd most used station in the 423-station system. This amounted to an average of 10,460 passengers per weekday.
