= IRT Pelham Line =

New York City Subway line

- The 6 and <6> trains serve the entire IRT Pelham Line.

Overview
- Owner: City of New York
- Locale: The Bronx, New York City
- Termini: Pelham Bay Park; Third Avenue–138th Street
- Stations: 18

Service
- Type: Rapid transit
- System: New York City Subway
- Operator: New York City Transit Authority
- Daily ridership: 120,889 (2023)

History
- Opened: August 1, 1918; 108 years ago
- Last extension: 1920

Technical
- Num of tracks: 2–3
- Character: Underground (Hunts Point & South); Elevated (North of Hunts Point)
- Track gauge: 4 ft 8 1/2 in (1,435 mm)
- Electrification: 600V DC third rail
Route map
Express station	Local station

The IRT Pelham Line is a rapid transit line on the New York City Subway, operated as part of the A Division and served by the 6 and <6> trains. It was built as part of the Dual Contracts expansion and opened between 1918 and 1920. It is both elevated and underground with Whitlock Avenue being the southernmost elevated station. It has three tracks from the beginning to just south of the Pelham Bay Park terminal. The Pelham Line also has a connection to Westchester Yard, where 6 trains are stored, just north of Westchester Square–East Tremont Avenue.

== History ==
=== Planning ===
On March 1, 1905, the Board of Rapid Transit Commissioners laid out its tentative plans for new subway routes to expand the city's first subway, which had opened on October 27, 1904. A preliminary report was released on March 9, and the final report was completed on March 30, before two further amendments were made on April 13 and May 12, 1905. On June 1, 1905, the Board adopted resolutions laying out multiple routes across the city, including Route 19, a line along Southern Boulevard and Westchester Avenue. The route was planned to begin at 138th Street and Third Avenue, with connections either with new subway lines to Manhattan, or to Route 17, a planned subway under Gerard Avenue. The three-track line would have then continued east under 138th Street to Southern Boulevard. It would then emerge as an elevated structure and continue via Southern Boulevard and Westchester Avenue to the "former village of Westchester." It was decided to have a portion of the line be constructed on an elevated structure due to the higher cost of building subways in the Bronx, whose soil was irregular and rocky. On July 14, 1905, the New York City Board of Estimate adopted resolutions approving the routes planned by the Rapid Transit Board, including for this route.

On March 19, 1913, New York City, the Brooklyn Rapid Transit Company, and the Interborough Rapid Transit Company (IRT) reached an agreement, known as the Dual Contracts, to drastically expand subway service across New York City. As part of Contract 3 of the agreement, between New York City and the IRT, the original subway opened by the IRT in 1904 to City Hall, was to be extended north from Grand Central along Lexington Avenue into the Bronx, with a branch running northeast via 138th Street, Southern Boulevard and Westchester Avenue to Pelham Bay Park.

=== Construction and opening ===
In November 1915, the New York Public Service Commission approved plans for the construction of Section 2 of the line, which would be its elevated section, and opened it up to bids on November 30. The contractor for the section was expected to complete work on it within eighteen months. As part of the construction of this section of the line, a new bridge would be built over the Bronx River, which would be 61 feet (19 m) above high tide. Permission to construct a bridge over the river was obtained from the federal government after marked negotiations. At the time, work on Sections 1 and 1A, between 138th Street and Park Avenue and Southern Boulevard and Whitlock Avenue, was 75 percent complete.

The IRT Lexington Avenue Line opened on July 17, 1918, and the first section of the IRT Pelham Line opened to Third Avenue–138th Street on August 1, 1918. On August 1, 1918, a branch of the IRT Lexington Avenue Line, the IRT Pelham Line was opened to Third Avenue–138th Street. On January 7, 1919, the Pelham Line was extended to Hunts Point Avenue. The extension was originally supposed to be finished by the end of 1918, but due to the difficulty in acquiring materials, the opening was delayed. In January 1919, the Public Service Commission was acquiring property for a subway yard at Pelham Bay Park.

On May 30, 1920, the Pelham Line was extended to East 177th Street. Service between Hunts Point Avenue and East 177th Street was originally served by a shuttle service operating with elevated cars. On October 24, 1920, it was extended to Westchester Square, and on December 20, it was extended to the western edge of Pelham Bay Park. Service to Pelham Bay Park was served by a mix of through and shuttle trains during the 1920s.

A report, "Proposed Subway Plan for Subway Relief and Expansion" by Major Philip Mathews, published on December 24, 1926, proposed a connection from the Pelham Line to a newly proposed four-track Third Avenue subway that would run to City Hall and Downtown Brooklyn.

When the New York, Westchester and Boston Railway was abandoned in 1937, one proposal for the replacement IRT Dyre Avenue Line was to connect the line to the IRT Pelham Line at Whitlock Avenue, rather than its current terminus at East 180th Street on the IRT White Plains Road Line.

=== Improvements ===
On June 6, 1946, the New York City Board of Transportation announced that a contract for the installation of signal equipment that would allow express service to run on the Pelham Line was jointly awarded to the Emerson–Garden Electric Company and L. K. Comstock & Company Incorporated for $129,516. The signals were to be installed between Third Avenue–138th Street and Parkchester.

Beginning October 14, 1946, weekday rush and Saturday morning rush peak direction express service started, with Pelham Bay trains using the middle track between East 177th Street and Third Avenue–138th Street. This express service saved eight minutes between Third Avenue and East 177th Street. During this time, 6 trains that ran local in the Bronx when express trains operated began to terminate at East 177 Street to make room for express trains to Pelham Bay Park. Express service did not start until this date because of the increase in ridership from the huge Parkchester housing complex at East 177th Street.

On November 8, 1947, Union Switch and Signal Company was awarded a contract for $819,375 for block signaling on the Pelham Line. This would have allowed an extension of express service from Parkchester to Pelham Bay Park.

The Westchester Yard was expanded between 1946 and 1949 and the scope of the project included a new signal tower, signal installations, and the elimination of the grade crossings between the yard and the Pelham Line north of the Westchester Square station. All of these projects would allow for quicker main line service and train movements in and out of the yard. The grade separation allowed trains to enter Westchester Yard without crossing the express track or the downtown local track and it allowed for the possibility of the extension of express service to Pelham Bay Park, which would save four more minutes. The increased capacity of the yard allowed for storage of 358 additional subway cars. With the additional space, it would no longer be required to lay up trains on the middle track of the line between East 177th Street and Pelham Bay Park, and it would allow for full day express service. The construction of substations would improve voltage conditions and allow for longer trains to be operated on the line. The work was projected to cost $6,387,000 and it was projected to be completed in 1950.

On August 27, 1953, the New York City Transit Authority approved a plan to lengthen trains along the Pelham Line from seven cars to eight cars during rush hours. The change took place on September 8, 1953.

The 2015–2019 Metropolitan Transportation Authority (MTA) Capital Program called for four of the Pelham Line's stations, along with 29 others, to undergo a complete overhaul as part of the Enhanced Station Initiative. The stations receiving renovations are Third Avenue–138th Street, Brook Avenue, Hunts Point Avenue, and Westchester Square–East Tremont Avenue. Updates would include cellular service, Wi-Fi, USB charging stations, interactive service advisories and maps, improved signage, and improved station lighting. However, in April 2018, it was announced that cost overruns had forced the MTA to reduce the number of subway stations included in the program from 33 stations to 20. The stations to be renovated on the IRT Pelham Line were among the 13 stations without funding, which will be pushed back to the 2020–2024 Capital Program.

=== Unrealized expansion plans ===
As part of a 1951 plan by the New York City Board of Transportation, the capacity on the Pelham Line would have been increased.

In March 1954, as part of a proposed $658 million construction program, the entire Pelham Line would have been connected to the Second Avenue Subway, with service being tripled on the Pelham Line.

The IRT Pelham Line would be very easily converted to B Division standards, and connected to the Second Avenue Subway as Route 132–B of the 1968 Program for Action. Second Avenue Subway trains would run east under 138th Street, then along the right-of-way of Amtrak's Northeast Corridor from 138th Street to a point near the Bruckner Expressway and Westchester Avenue as an express bypass of the Pelham line, after which the line would split into a Pelham branch and a Dyre Avenue branch. The Brook Avenue station just east of Third Avenue–138th Street on the IRT Pelham Line would be reconstructed to allow a cross-platform interchange. Further north, there would be a connection with the IRT Pelham Line near Westchester Avenue at the Whitlock Avenue station, and station platforms north to Pelham Bay Park would be narrowed and lengthened to accommodate the longer and wider B Division trains from the Second Avenue Subway. IRT local service on the Pelham Line would terminate at Hunts Point Avenue one stop south. This project would have helped relieve overcrowding on the IRT Lexington Avenue Line, which is the busiest line in the country.

Under Phase 2 of the Program for Action, the Pelham Line would have been extended to a modern terminal in the Co-op City housing complex. Due to the 1975–1976 fiscal crisis that affected the city, most of the remaining projects did not have funding, so they were declined. Expected to be completed by the mid-1970s and early 1980s, lines for the Program for Action had to be reduced or canceled altogether due to the 1970s fiscal crisis.

== Extent and service ==
The following services use part or all of the IRT Pelham Line:

Service	Time period		
Service	Rush hours and middays, peak direction		Other times
Service	South of Parkchester	North of Parkchester	Other times
Local	Local	No service	Local
Express	Express	Local	No service

Express service operates between Parkchester and Third Avenue–138th Street during weekdays from approximately 6:30 a.m. to 8:45 p.m. At those times, Pelham Bay Park cannot handle the large number of 6 and <6> trains in service. As a result, 6 trains run local on the Pelham Line south of Parkchester and short turn there. <6> trains make all stops north of Parkchester, then run express using the center track between that station and Third Avenue–138th Street in the peak direction. At all other times, 6 trains run local on the entire line.

=== Route description ===
Beginning at a junction with the IRT Jerome Avenue Line north of the Lexington Avenue Tunnel at 135th Street, the IRT Pelham Line runs beneath 138th Street for the first three stations in Mott Haven, then curves to the northeast along eastbound Bruckner Boulevard before shortly curving north again along Southern Boulevard. After 145th Street at Samuel Gompers High School, the line curves to the northeast continuing to run under Southern Boulevard. The line returns under eastbound Bruckner Boulevard again, only to leave at Whitlock Avenue and begins to emerge from underground at Aldus Street. The line is transformed into an elevated line over Whitlock Avenue at East 165th Street, but shortly after this encounters the Whitlock Avenue Subway station and curves east over Westchester Avenue which runs over Sheridan Boulevard, the Harlem River and Port Chester Railroad line, and the Bronx River. The line remains over Westchester Avenue throughout the rest of its journey.

East of Morrison Avenue station, the road runs over the Bronx River Parkway, and enters Parkchester. The station named after the neighborhood runs over the Hugh J. Grant Circle, which is also over the Cross Bronx Expressway. East of Castle Hill Avenue station, Westchester Avenue branches off to the northeast at Waterbury Avenue (which runs in the same direction prior to that branching), and the line follows. After the Westchester Yard the line runs over the Hutchinson River Parkway interchange just west of Middletown Road station. The line finally ends at Pelham Bay Park station, which contains a pedestrian bridge across Bruckner Expressway leading to the eponymous park.

== Depiction in fiction ==
The train that is hijacked in the novel The Taking of Pelham One Two Three by Morton Freedgood (writing as John Godey) departs from Pelham Bay Park at 1:23 pm, hence the name "Pelham 123". After the release of the 1974 film adaptation, the New York City Transit Authority banned any schedule of a train leaving this station at 1:23 am or 1:23 pm. Eventually this policy was rescinded, but due to the superstitions involved, dispatchers have continued to avoid scheduling a Manhattan-bound train to leave at 1:23.

== Station listing ==
Station service legend
Stops all times	Stops 24 hours a day
Stops all times except rush hours in the peak direction	Stops 24 hours a day, except during weekday rush hours in the peak direction
Stops rush hours in the peak direction only	Stops during weekday rush hours in the peak direction only
Time period details
Disabled access	Station is compliant with the Americans with Disabilities Act
↑	Station is compliant with the Americans with Disabilities Act in the indicated direction only
↓	Station is compliant with the Americans with Disabilities Act in the indicated direction only
	Elevator access to mezzanine only

Neighborhood (approximate)	Disabled access	Station	Tracks	Services	Opened	Notes
Pelham Bay	Disabled access	Pelham Bay Park		6 <6>	December 20, 1920	Bx12 Select Bus Service
Pelham Bay	Center Express track begins (No Regular Service to Parkchester)					
Pelham Bay		Buhre Avenue	local	6 <6>	December 20, 1920	
Pelham Bay		Middletown Road	local	6 <6>	December 20, 1920	
connecting tracks to Westchester Yard
Westchester Square	Disabled access	Westchester Square–East Tremont Avenue	local	6 <6>	October 24, 1920	
Westchester Square		Zerega Avenue	local	6 <6>	October 24, 1920	
Unionport		Castle Hill Avenue	local	6 <6>	October 24, 1920	
<6> service switches to/from center express track
Parkchester	Disabled access	Parkchester	all	6 <6>	May 30, 1920	Q44 Select Bus Service originally Parkchester–East 177th Street
Soundview		St. Lawrence Avenue	local	6	May 30, 1920	
Soundview		Morrison Avenue–Soundview	local	6	May 30, 1920	originally Sound View Avenue, Morrison–Sound View Avenues
Soundview		Elder Avenue	local	6	May 30, 1920	
Longwood		Whitlock Avenue	local	6	May 30, 1920	
Longwood	Disabled access	Hunts Point Avenue	all	6 <6>	January 7, 1919	Bx6 Select Bus Service
Longwood		Longwood Avenue	local	6	January 7, 1919	
Longwood	Disabled access	East 149th Street	local	6	January 7, 1919	
Mott Haven		East 143rd Street–St. Mary's Street	local	6	January 7, 1919	
Mott Haven		Cypress Avenue	local	6	January 7, 1919	
Mott Haven		Brook Avenue	local	6	January 7, 1919	
Mott Haven		Third Avenue–138th Street	all	6 <6>	August 1, 1918	
Mott Haven	Center Express track ends					
Merges with IRT Lexington Avenue Line (6 <6>)
