= The Hub, Bronx =

Commercial center in New York City

The Hub
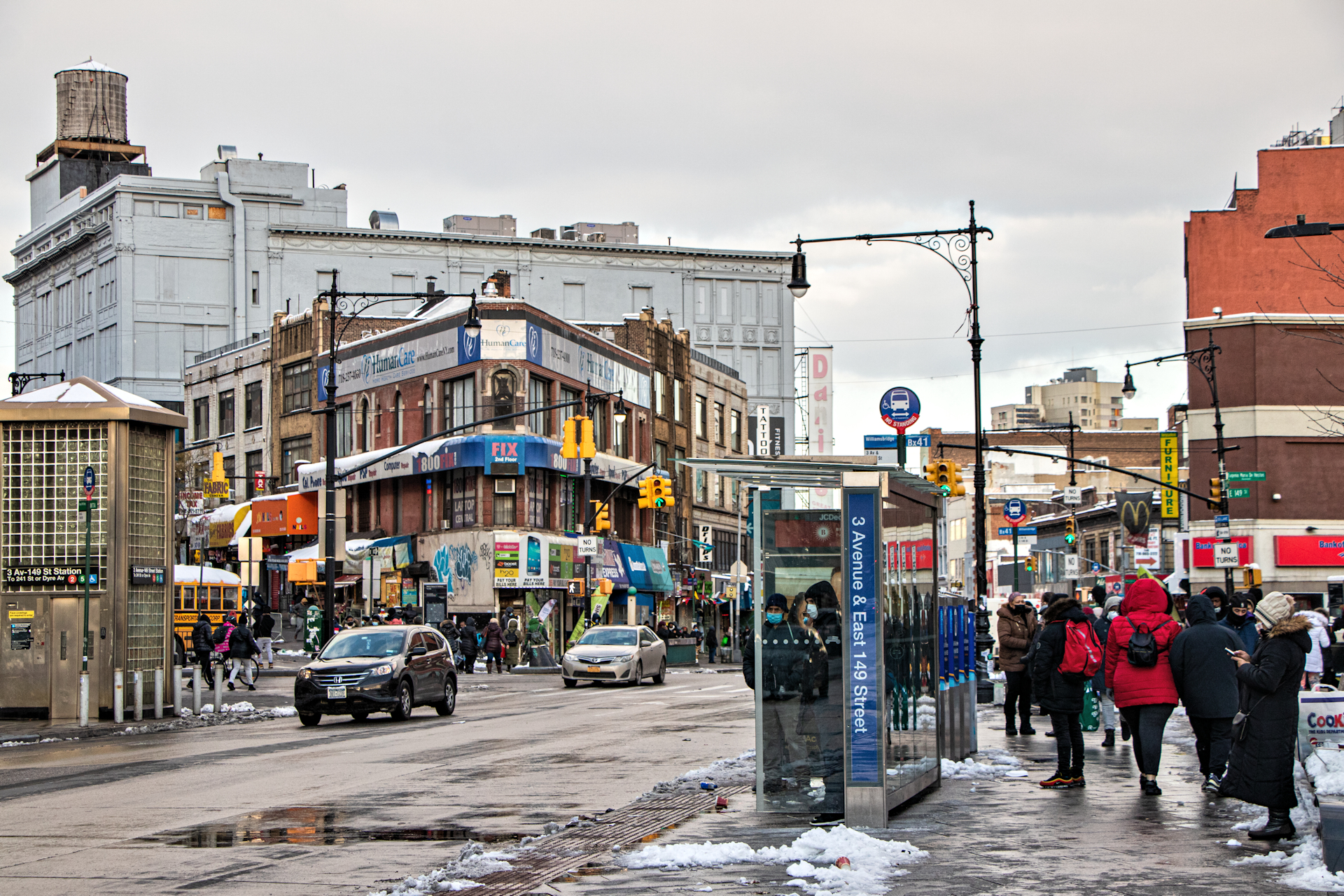
- Nickname: "the Broadway of the Bronx"
- Location in New York City
- Coordinates: 40.816°N 73.917°W
- Locale: South Bronx, New York City, New York
- Subway services: at Third Avenue – 149th Street station
- Bus routes: Bx2, Bx4, Bx15, Bx19, Bx21, Bx32, Bx41, Bx41 SBS, M125

The Hub is a major commercial center for the South Bronx, New York. It is located where four roads converge: East 149th Street, Willis Avenue, Melrose Avenue, and Third Avenues. It is primarily located inside the neighborhood of Melrose but also lines the northern border of Mott Haven.

The Hub, short for "the Hub of the Bronx," has also been called "the Broadway of the Bronx". It is the site of both maximum traffic and architectural density. In configuration, it resembles a miniature Times Square, a spatial "bow-tie" created by the geometry of the street intersections. It is a primary shopping district for Bronx residents, and many new hip hop trends can be found in the Hub long before they spread to the rest of New York City and the world.

The area is part of Bronx Community Board 1.

== History ==
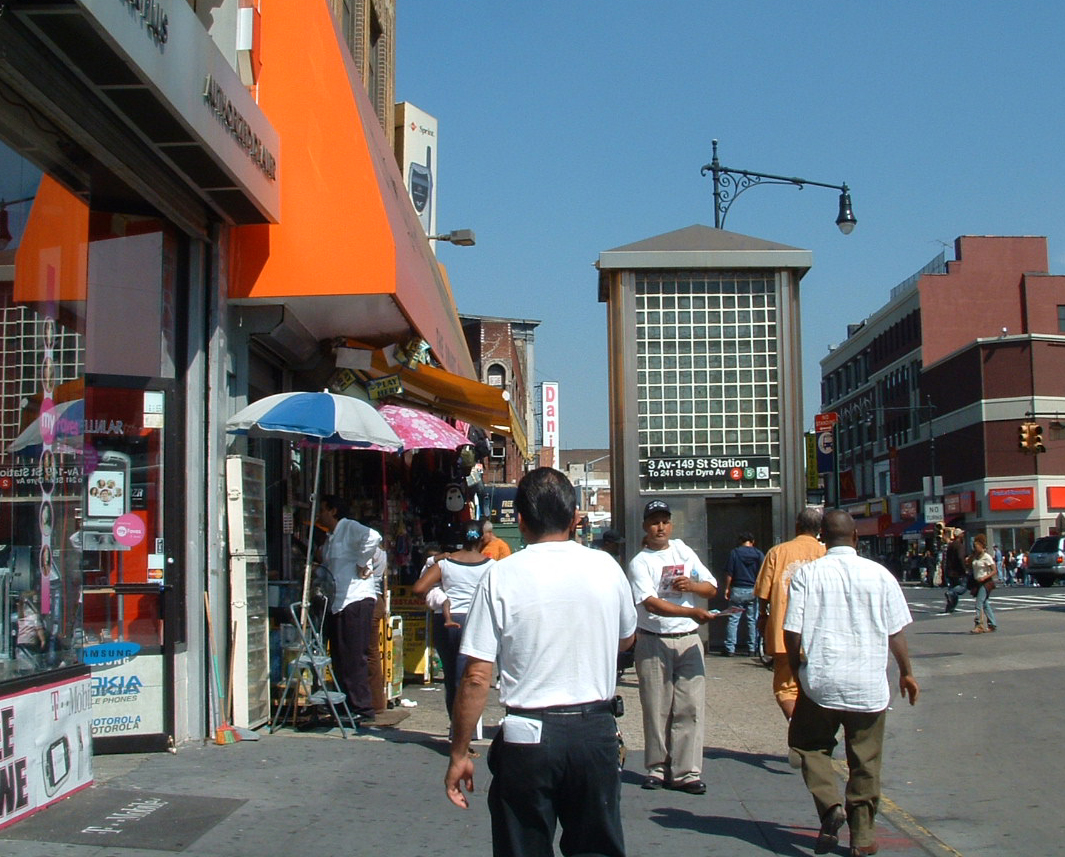
Merchants hawk their wares by calling out to the crowd or passing out small handbills in 2007.

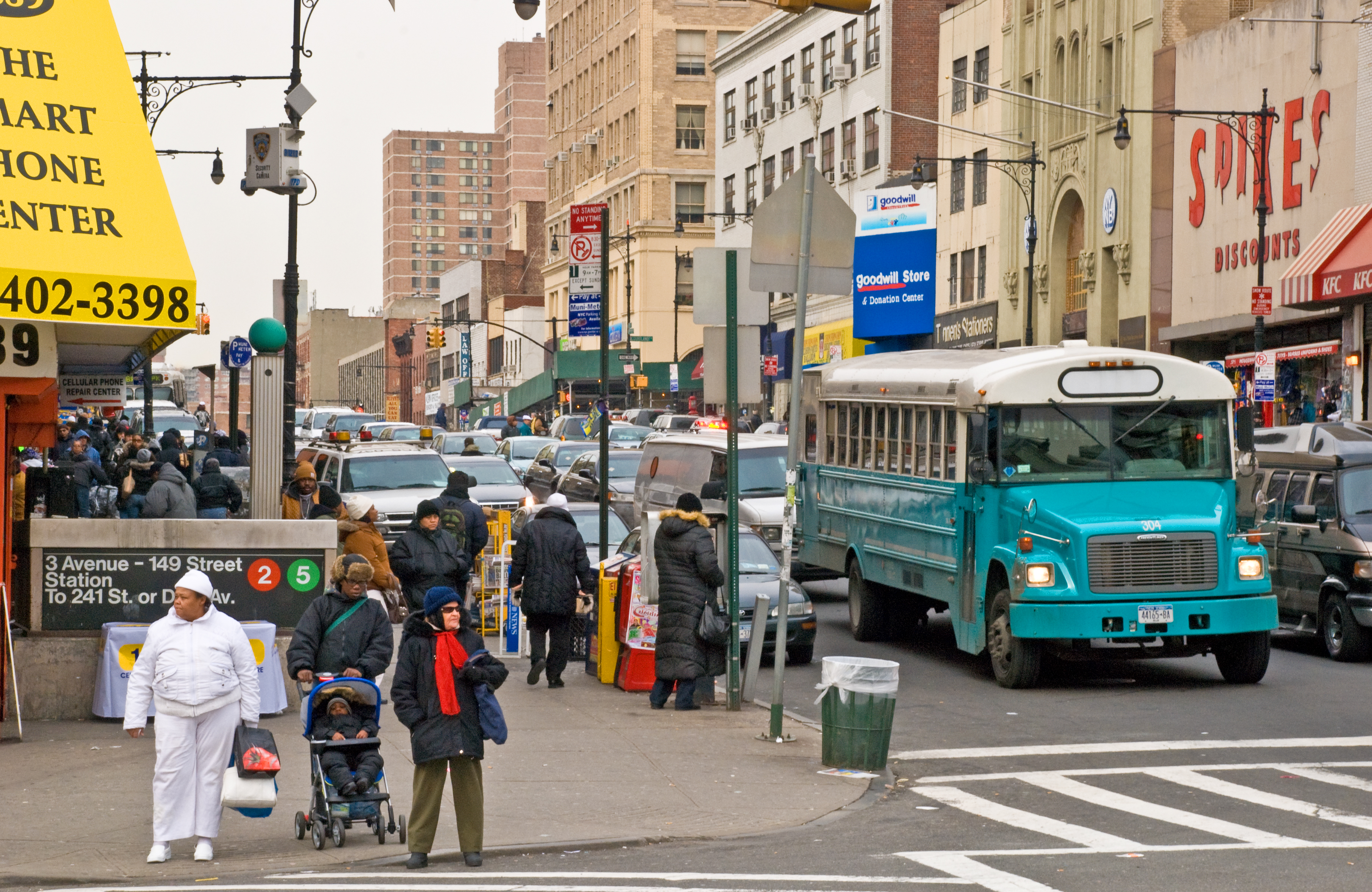
East 149th Street and Third Avenue

The Hub is the oldest major shopping locale in the Bronx. Between 1900 and 1930, the number of Bronx residents increased from 201,000 to 1,265,000. Inhabitants throughout the borough shopped in department stores and boutiques at 149th Street and 3rd Avenue, an area that came to be known in this time as "the Hub". In the 1930s the Hub had movie palaces and vaudeville theaters. These included the Bronx Opera House, which today operates as a boutique hotel, and the former Jackson Theatre.

A few decades after it became a national symbol of urban decay, the South Bronx is now home to several new construction projects that are rebuilding neighborhoods that have seen little new construction in half a century. On March 14, 2006, Mayor Michael Bloomberg and other elected officials took part in the symbolic groundbreaking ceremony for the new "Hub Retail and Office Center". After a year and a half of construction, the Hub Retail and Office Center opened in the middle of 2007. As a result, the Hub's district is extended to East 156th Street in Melrose.

Shopping traffic in the Hub is generated via foot, car, and public transportation. Sidewalks in the Hub are often crowded. Merchants hawk their wares by calling out to the crowd or passing out small handbills. Music stores offer a wide selection of hip-hop, reggae, gospel, and Latin music. Craft stores have knitting and sewing supplies. Local mom-and-pop stores compete with major retail chain stores.

A new complex with mixed-use office and retail space named the Triangle Plaza Hub opened in the summer of 2016.

== Transportation ==
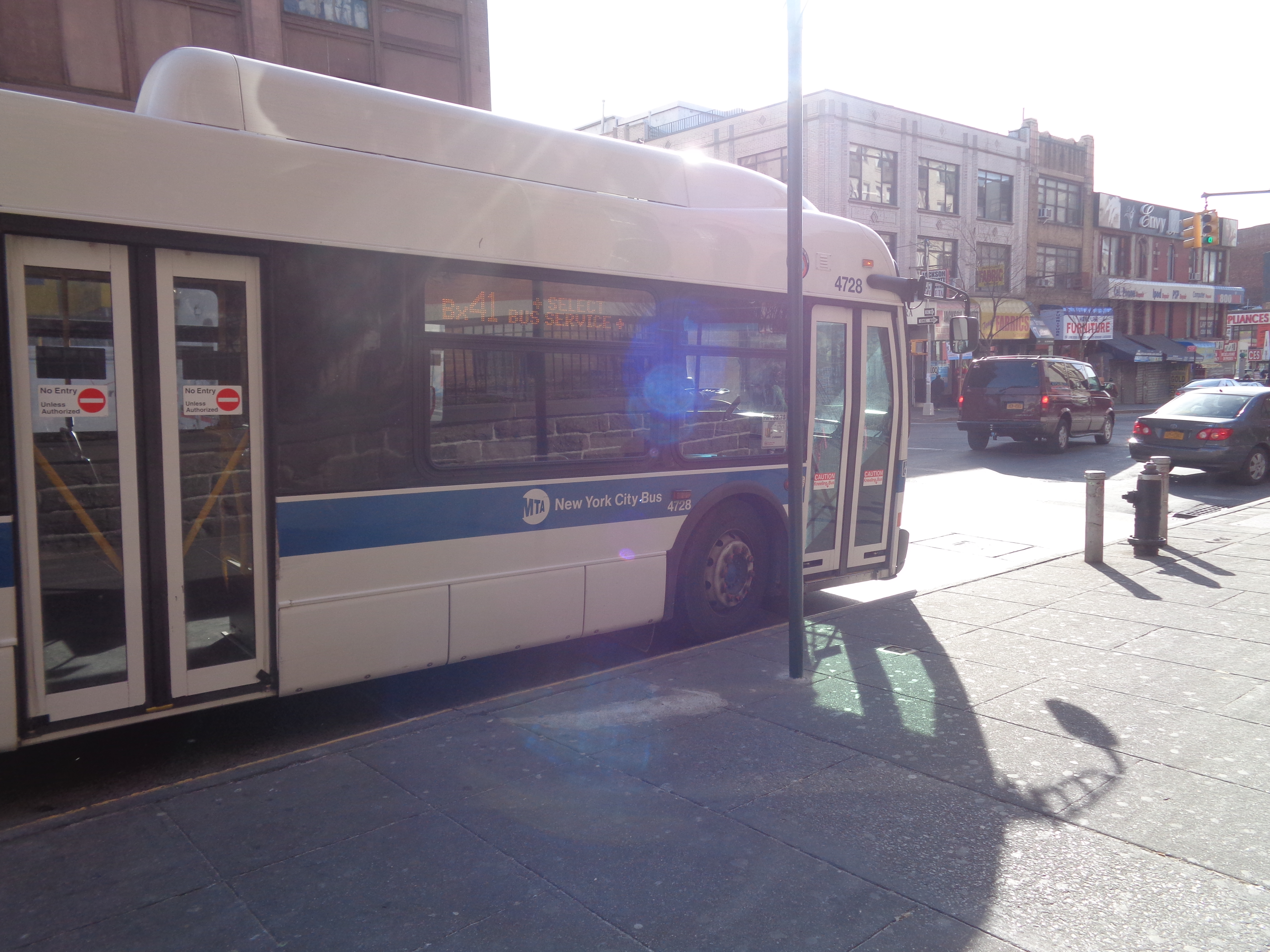
A Bx41 Select Bus Service bus at its terminal at Melrose Avenue and 150th Street

The Hub, located at the junction of four major thoroughfares, is well served by public transport.

The following MTA Regional Bus Operations bus routes serve the Hub:

- Bx2: to Riverdale (AM hours & Sundays Only), Kingsbridge Heights or Third Avenue–138th Street station (via Grand Concourse) all other times
- Bx4: to Westchester Square (via Westchester Avenue)
- Bx15: to Fordham Plaza (via Third Avenue)
- Bx19: to New York Botanical Garden or Riverbank State Park (via 149th Street–Southern Boulevard)
- Bx21: Westchester Square or Third Avenue–138th Street station (via Boston Road)
- Bx32: to VA Hospital or Third Avenue–138th Street station (via Morris-Jerome Avenues)
- Bx41 and Bx41 SBS: to Williamsbridge–Gun Hill Road (via Webster Avenue)
- M125: to Manhattanville (via 125th Street)

The following New York City Subway stations serve the Hub:

- Third Avenue–149th Street subway station on the IRT White Plains Road Line (2 and 5 trains)

The Hub does not have a nearby Metro-North Railroad station, but the Melrose station is a few blocks north at 162nd Street and Park Avenue. In 1902 a large Grand Union Station was proposed near the now-closed 138th Street station, half a mile from the Hub, which would have been served by many of the railroads entering Manhattan at the time. However, this was never built.

The 149th Street station on the IRT Third Avenue Line operated from 1887 to 1973. The confluence of the since-demolished IRT Third Avenue Line and IRT White Plains Road Line contributed to the Hub's growth.

== Business Improvement District ==
The Hub is maintained by the HUB Third Avenue Business Improvement District, which was established in 1990 as the Bronx's first business improvement district (BID). The BID is registered as a 501(c)(3) organization under the name Hub-Third Ave Merchants District Management Association Inc.

== See also ==
- Lincoln Hospital
- Hostos Community College
- Metropolitan College of New York
- St. Mary's Park
