= Westchester Avenue =

Avenue in the Bronx, New York

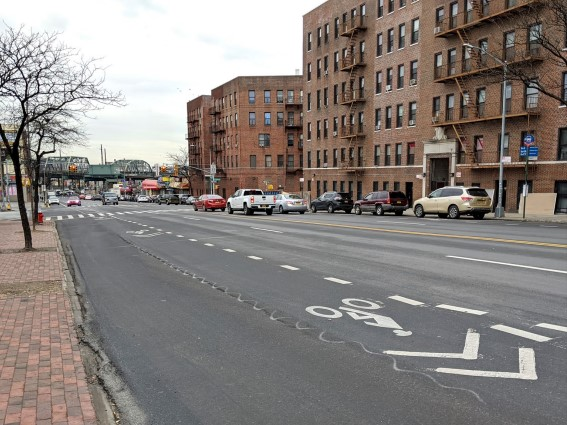
- Westchester Avenue at Bryant Triangle
- Interactive map of Westchester Avenue
- Owner: City of New York
- Maintained by: NYCDOT
- Length: 5.6 mi (9.0 km)
- Location: Bronx, New York City
- Coordinates: 40.85226°N 73.88198°W
- West end: Third Avenue in The Hub
- Major junctions: NY 895 in Longwood; Bronx River Parkway in Soundview; I-95 in Parkchester; Hutchinson River Parkway in Pelham Bay
- East end: I-95 in Pelham Bay

Westchester Avenue is a major east–west street in the South and East portions of the Bronx, New York City. It runs from Third Avenue and East 150th Street in the Hub to Pelham Bay Park in the Pelham Bay section. It crosses many neighborhoods of the Bronx, which include Melrose, Longwood, Soundview, Parkchester, and Pelham Bay. Westchester Avenue parallels the Bruckner Expressway until their junction at Pelham Bay Park.

== Transportation ==
With the exception of 0.5 miles (0.80 km) of its length, Westchester Avenue is underneath elevated tracks of the New York City Subway:

- The IRT White Plains Road Line ( trains) runs over Westchester Avenue from Brook Avenue to Southern Boulevard.
- The IRT Pelham Line ( trains) runs from Whitlock Avenue to its terminus at Pelham Bay Park.

The following bus routes serve the corridor:

- The Bx4 is Westchester Avenue’s main bus, serving it from Bergen Avenue to Lane Avenue (Westchester Square station), and from Westchester Square to Saint Ann’s Avenue (Third Avenue-149th Street station).
  - The Bx4A joins in between Hugh J. Grant Circle, and either East 167th Street (Longwood) or West Farms Road (Westchester Square station).
- The Bx27 follows the Bx4A service pattern in Longwood, but heads south on Morrison Avenue.
- The Bx24 serves the rest of the avenue east of Westchester Square, with the Bx8 west of and the BxM8 east of, Crosby Avenue.
  - Most BxM8 buses terminate at the avenue’s eastern end, Bruckner Boulevard, while two peak hour buses in both directions continue to City Island.
- The Bx21 runs between Waters Place and Westchester Square, with said bound trips terminating at Benson Street and starting Mott Haven trips at Lane Avenue.
- The M125 runs out of service from Bergen to Third Avenues to change direction from The Hub to Manhattanville.
