= Third Avenue–149th Street station =

New York City Subway station in the Bronx

3 Avenue–149 Street
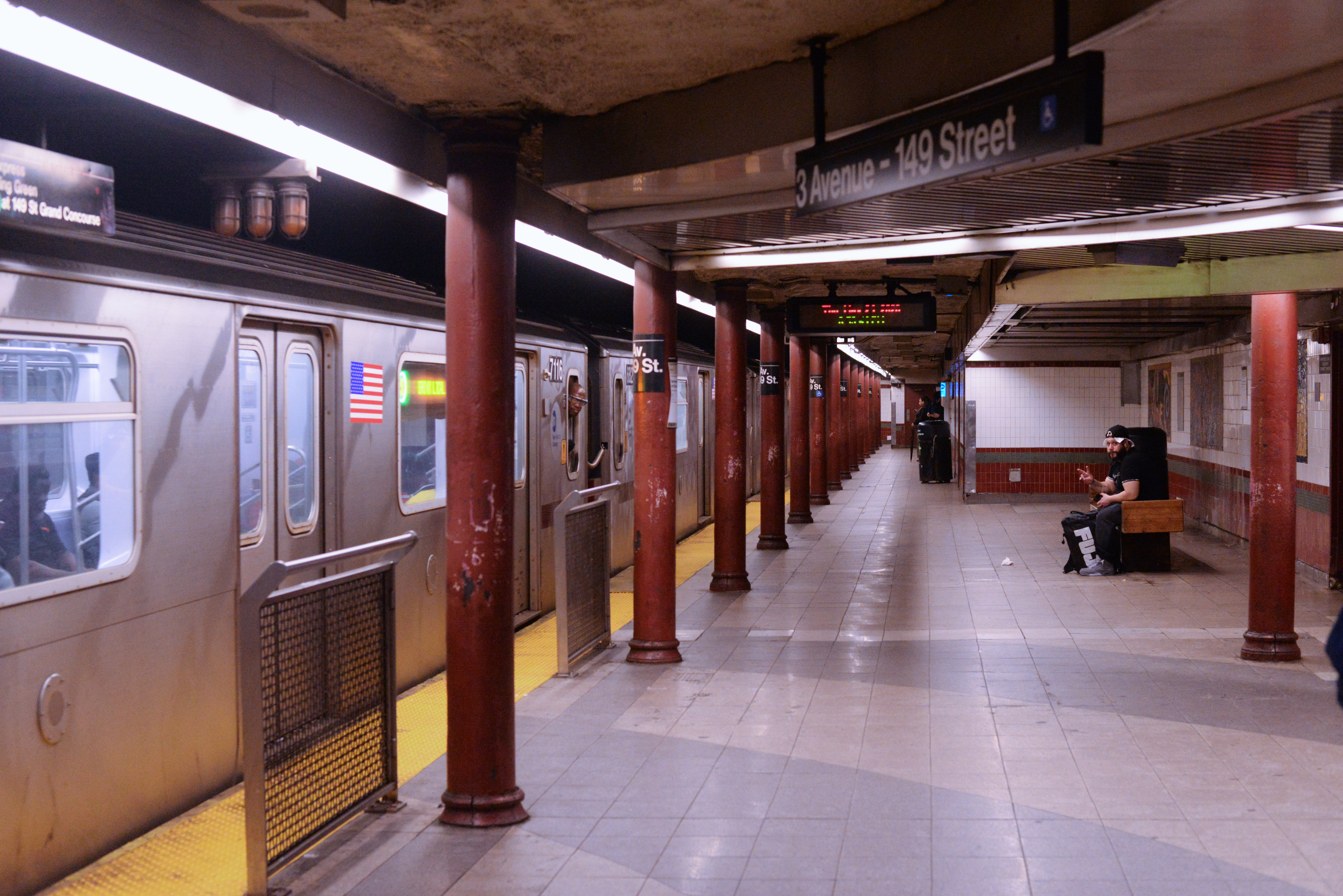
- A 5 train at the platform

Station statistics
- Address: East 149th Street, Third, Willis & Melrose Avenues; Bronx, New York
- Borough: The Bronx
- Locale: The Hub, Mott Haven, Melrose
- Coordinates: 40.816099°N 73.917676°W
- Division: A (IRT)
- Line: IRT White Plains Road Line
- Services: 2 (all times); 5 (all times except late nights)
- Transit: NYCT Bus: Bx2, Bx4, Bx15, Bx19, Bx21, Bx41, Bx41 SBS, M125
- Structure: Underground
- Platforms: 2 side platforms
- Tracks: 2

Other information
- Opened: July 10, 1905; 121 years ago
- Accessible: Yes

Traffic
- 2025: 4,261,404 ▲16.9%
- Rank: 79 out of 423
Services
Preceding station	New York City Subway	Following station
Jackson Avenue 2 5 via East 180th Street	Local	149th Street–Hostos 2 5 toward Flatbush Avenue–Brooklyn College
Jackson Avenue 2 5 via East 180th Street	5 (New York City Subway service)	149th Street–Hostos 2 5 toward Flatbush Avenue–Brooklyn College
East 180th Street 5 express	5 (New York City Subway service)	149th Street–Hostos 2 5 toward Flatbush Avenue–Brooklyn College
Location
Location within New York City Subway
Location within New York City
Location within New York
Track layout
Street map
Station service legend
Symbol	Description
Stops all times except late nights	Stops all times except late nights
Stops all times except rush hours in the peak direction	Stops all times except rush hours in the peak direction
Stops all times	Stops all times
Stops rush hours in the peak direction only	Stops rush hours in the peak direction only

The Third Avenue–149th Street station is a station on the IRT White Plains Road Line of the New York City Subway. It is located at Third Avenue and East 149th Street (the latter of which is also known as Eugenio Maria de Hostos Boulevard) in the Hub in the South Bronx adjacent to Mott Haven and Melrose. The station is served by the 2 train at all times and the 5 train at all times except nights. The station is the second-busiest in the Bronx and 59th overall, with around 6.768 million passengers using the station as of 2019.

== History ==
The station opened on July 10, 1905, along with the 149th Street–Hostos station and the connection with the IRT Lenox Avenue Line in Manhattan. Free transfers were provided between the subway and the existing 149th Street elevated station of the IRT Third Avenue Line, which opened in 1887. The convergence of the two rapid transit lines, the surface trolley lines along Third Avenue and 149th Street, and the ensuing commercial development led to the coining of the name "the Hub" for the intersection in the early 20th century.

The city government took over the IRT's operations on June 12, 1940. Following the closure of the Third Avenue elevated in 1973, free paper transfers were provided between the subway and the Bx55 limited-stop bus, which replaced the elevated. However, scalpers would often resell these transfers for 50 cents. Because of the unique transfer, the station was one of the first to test the MetroCard system in the early 1990s, and the paper transfers were finally scrapped in 1997 with the wider rollout of the MetroCard.

In 1981, the MTA listed the station among the 69 most deteriorated stations in the subway system.

In 1996, ceramic mosaics by Jose Ortega were installed at the station, as part of the MTA's Arts for Transit program. The MTA announced in 2025 that a customer service center would open at the station. In October 2026, the MTA announced plans to install taller fare gates with glass panels at 20 additional stations, including the Third Avenue–149th Street station, following a successful pilot program at earlier stations.

== Station layout ==
The station has two tracks and two side platforms, with no crossovers or crossunders between the platforms. The station has been renovated, with ADA-accessible elevators installed on both sides of the station.

The station tiles have dark red and dark green/gray lower accents and dark red upper border. There are ceramic mosaics, installed in 1996 under the MTA's Arts for Transit program, entitled Una Raza, Un Mundo, Universo (One Race, One World, One Universe), by Jose Ortega. Four such mosaics are on each platform near the fare control. The token booths are built into the wall. Prior to the renovation, terra cotta "3" plaques were on the platform walls. One of these has been preserved at the New York Transit Museum.

Immediately east (railroad north) of the station, past Bergen Avenue, the tracks ascend to become an elevated structure for the trip to East 180th Street. This is the longest section of elevated track built under IRT Contract I. At the El level, one can still see the shortened supports for former track connections with the Third Avenue El. The express run to the next express station north, East 180th Street is 3.4 miles (5.5 km) long and bypasses seven stations, making it the second-longest express run in the system behind the 3.5-mile (5.6 km) express run between 125th Street and 59th Street–Columbus Circle on the IND Eighth Avenue Line, which also bypasses seven stations.

=== Exits ===
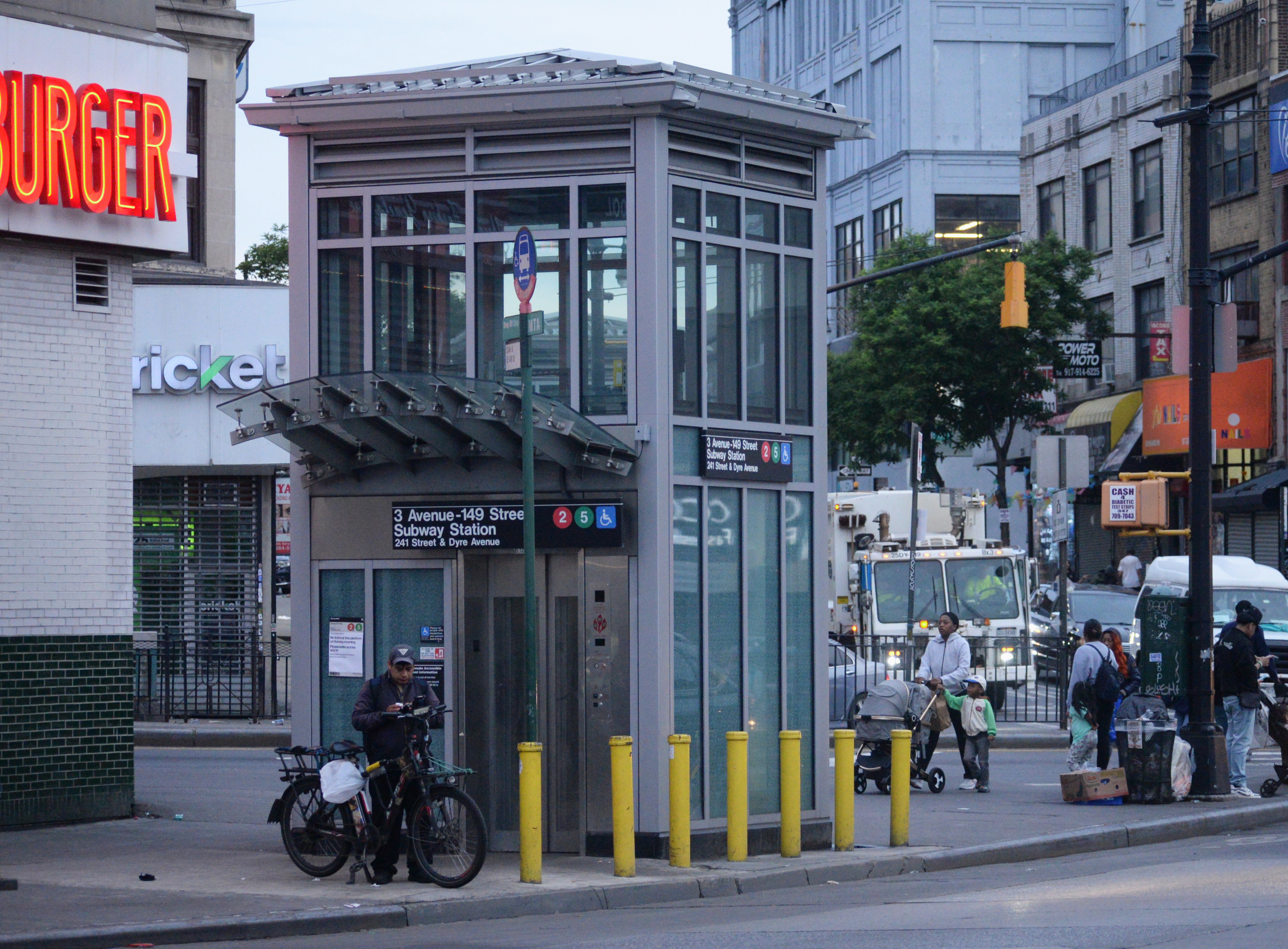
Uptown elevator

The fare control is at platform level and there is a closed crossunder. Each fare control area has a bus transfer booth, which was used for the connection to the former Bx55 bus route that replaced the IRT Third Avenue Line in the Bronx. The extra booths and turnstiles, while still present, are no longer in use, having closed in July 1997 when system-wide free transfers were introduced with the MetroCard.

For each platform, three staircases lead up from fare control to the street; the north side of 149th Street for the Manhattan-bound platform, and the south side for the Bronx-bound platform. The elevators are located on the west side of the intersection. The elevators were closed for replacement in the early 2020s and reopened in May 2025.

== Points of interest ==
The station is located in the Hub, the oldest major shopping locale in the Bronx.

Nearby points of interest include:

- Alfred E. Smith Career and Technical Education High School
- Bronx Opera House
- College of New Rochelle, John Cardinal O'Connor Campus.
- Patterson Houses
- South Bronx Educational Campus, formerly South Bronx High School.

== See also ==
- 149th Street station (IRT Third Avenue Line)
