= Bx4 and Bx4A buses =

Bus routes in the Bronx, New York

bx4, bx4a
- Westchester Avenue Line
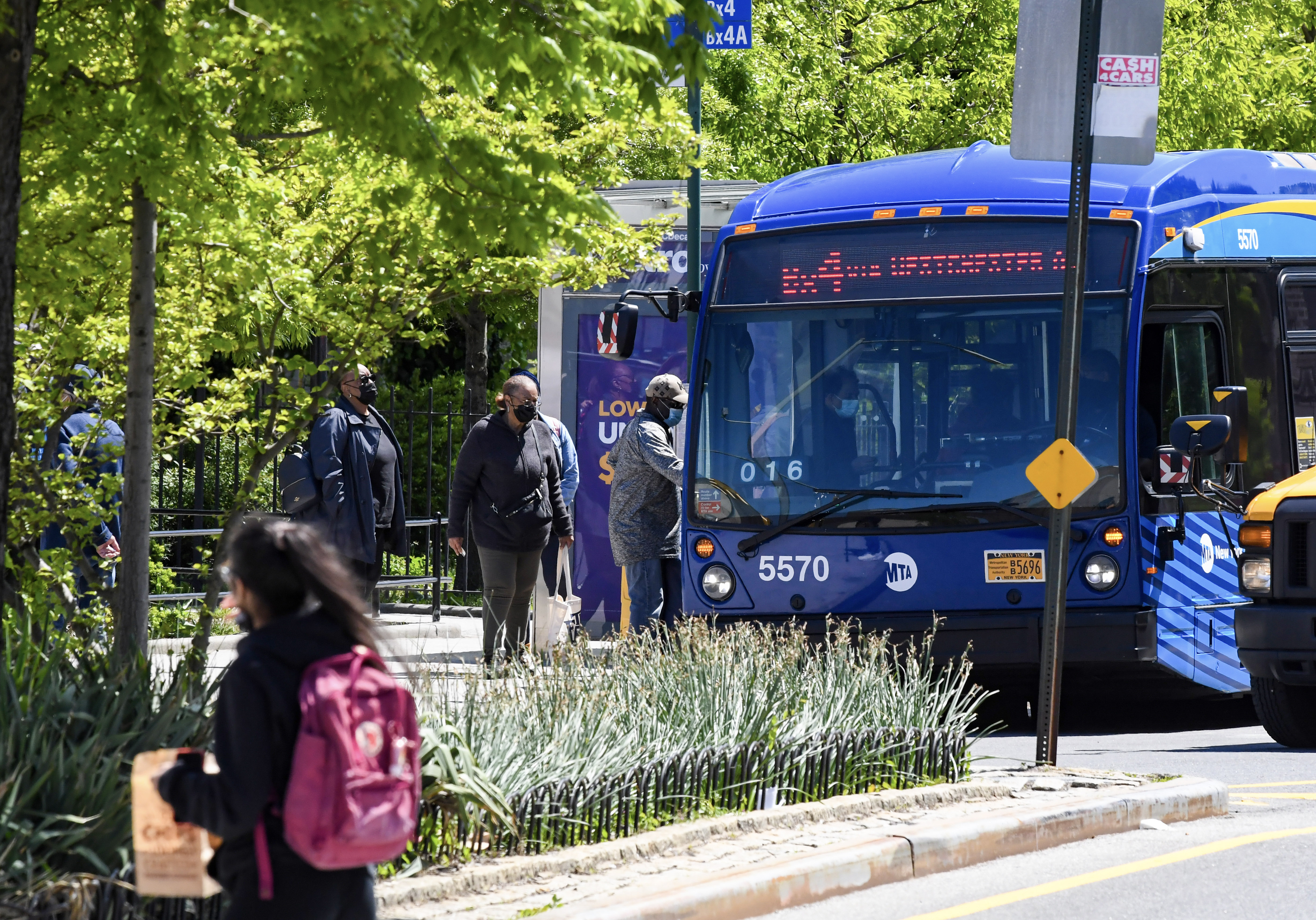
- A 2018 Nova Bus LFS Articulated (5570) on the Bx4 at Westchester Square

Overview
- System: MTA Regional Bus Operations
- Operator: Manhattan and Bronx Surface Transit Operating Authority
- Garage: Gun Hill Depot
- Vehicle: Nova Bus LFS articulated New Flyer Xcelsior XD60 (main vehicles); Nova Bus LFS; Nova Bus LFS HEV; New Flyer Xcelsior XD40; New Flyer Xcelsior XE40 (supplemental service)
- Began service: July 10, 1948 (Bx4); January 2, 2011 (Bx4A)

Route
- Locale: The Bronx, New York, U.S.
- Communities served: The Hub – Bergen Avenue & East 149th Street (Bx4A)
- Start: The Hub – Bergen Avenue & East 149th Street (Bx4); Longwood – West Farms Road & Southern Boulevard (Bx4A)
- Via: Westchester Avenue, Metropolitan Avenue (Bx4A)
- End: Westchester Square–East Tremont Avenue station
- Length: 4.5 miles (7.2 km) (Bx4); 3.5 miles (5.6 km) (Bx4A)

Service
- Operates: All times except late nights
- Annual patronage: 1,508,598 (2025)
- Transfers: Yes
- Timetable: Bx4/Bx4A

The Westchester Avenue Line constitutes a public transit line along Westchester Avenue in the Bronx, running between The Hub and Westchester Square. Originally a streetcar line, it is now operated by the Bx4 and Bx4A bus routes of MaBSTOA under the NYCT brand.

== Route description ==
=== Streetcar line ===
The Westchester Avenue Line, originally operated by Union Railway Company, ran from The Hub at the south end of Westchester Avenue along it to Southern Boulevard, where it originally terminated. It was later extended to Hugh J. Grant Circle, and then again to Westchester Square, all along Westchester Avenue. The line ran under the designation "A".

== History ==
The Westchester Avenue Line was run by Union Railway Company, when it was chartered as an amalgamation of three separate streetcar companies in 1892. The line was electrified the same year and later fell under the Third Avenue Railroad Company when the Union Railway Company was acquired by them in 1898. In 1899, the line was extended from Southern Boulevard to Hugh Grant Circle in Unionport.

On July 10, 1948, the streetcars were replaced by the Bx42 bus, which followed the same routing as the streetcar.

On February 19, 1984, the Bronx bus system was revamped, and the Bx42 was renamed to the Bx4.

On January 2, 2011, a branch of the Bx4 called the Bx4A was created to run via Metropolitan and Tremont Avenues to replace service on the western part of the Bx14 route, which was discontinued on June 27, 2010, due to budget cuts.

In 2018, the MTA released its Fast Forward Plan, aimed at speeding up mass transit services. As part of it, a draft plan for the reorganization of Bronx bus routes was proposed in draft format in June 2019, with a final version published in October 2019. The plan included increasing Bx4 and Bx4A service, but in exchange, the Bx4A would be truncated to West Farms Road and Southern Boulevard. Due to the COVID-19 pandemic in New York City, the changes were halted for over a year. The modification took place on June 26, 2022.

== Incidents ==
In the evening of December 18, 2025, a bus operator was driving an eastbound Bx4 bus along Westchester Avenue when it lost control and crashed into a pole supporting the 6 train close to the Castle Hill Avenue station. Five passengers and the operator were injured, but the crash was not big enough to disrupt 6 service.
