= Pelham Bay Park station =

New York City Subway station in the Bronx

Pelham Bay Park
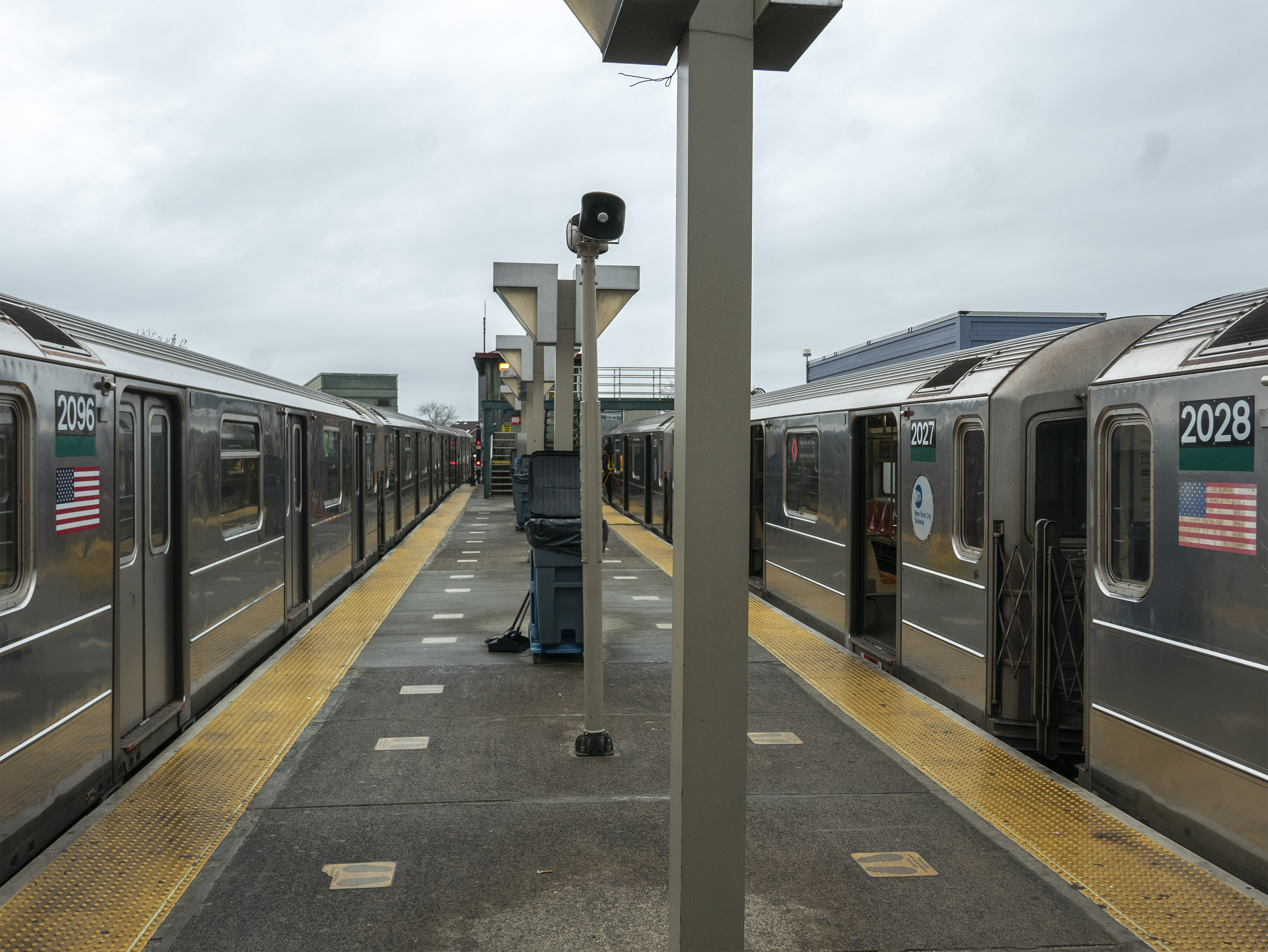

Station statistics
- Address: Bruckner Boulevard and Westchester Avenue; Bronx, New York
- Borough: The Bronx
- Locale: Pelham Bay
- Coordinates: 40.852871°N 73.827138°W
- Division: A (IRT)
- Line: IRT Pelham Line
- Services: 6 (all times except weekdays until 8:45 p.m., peak direction) <6> (weekdays until 8:45 p.m., peak direction)
- Transit: NYCT Bus: Bx5, Bx12, Bx12 SBS, Bx24, Bx29; MTA Bus: Bx23, Q50, BxM8; Bee-Line Bus: 45
- Structure: Elevated
- Platforms: 1 island platform (in service); 2 side platforms (presently used for offices and crew lockers)
- Tracks: 2

Other information
- Opened: December 20, 1920; 105 years ago
- Accessible: Yes
- Former/other names: Pelham Bay Parkway

Traffic
- 2025: 1,208,963 ▲6.1%
- Rank: 274 out of 423
Services
Preceding station	New York City Subway	Following station
Terminus	Local	Buhre Avenue 6 <6> toward Brooklyn Bridge–City Hall
Non-revenue services and lines
Preceding station	New York City Subway	Following station
	no service	Parkchester express
Location
Location within New York City Subway
Location within New York City
Location within New York
Track layout
Street map
Station service legend
Symbol	Description
Stops all times	Stops all times
Stops rush hours in the peak direction only	Stops rush hours in the peak direction only

The Pelham Bay Park station is the northern terminal station of the IRT Pelham Line of the New York City Subway. Located across from Pelham Bay Park, at the intersection of the Bruckner Expressway and Westchester Avenue in the Pelham Bay neighborhood of the Bronx, it is served by the 6 train at all times except weekdays in the peak direction, when the <6> train takes over service.

== History ==
In 1913, New York City, the Brooklyn Rapid Transit Company, and the Interborough Rapid Transit Company (IRT) reached an agreement, known as the Dual Contracts, to drastically expand subway service across New York City. As part of Contract 3 of the agreement, between New York City and the IRT, the original subway opened by the IRT in 1904 to City Hall, was to be extended north from Grand Central along Lexington Avenue into the Bronx, with a branch running northeast via 138th Street, Southern Boulevard and Westchester Avenue to Pelham Bay Park. The IRT Lexington Avenue Line opened on July 17, 1918, and the first section of the IRT Pelham Line opened to Third Avenue–138th Street on August 1, 1918.

On January 7, 1919, the Pelham Line was extended to Hunts Point Avenue. The extension was originally supposed to be finished by the end of 1918, but due to the difficulty in acquiring materials, the opening was delayed. In January 1919, the New York State Public Service Commission was acquiring property for a subway yard at Pelham Bay Park. On May 30, 1920, the Pelham Line was extended to East 177th Street. Service between Hunts Point Avenue and East 177th Street was originally served by a shuttle service operating with elevated cars. On October 24 of the same year, it was extended to Westchester Square. The line was completed to Pelham Bay Park station on December 20, which became the new terminal of the line. Service to Pelham Bay Park was served by a mix of through and shuttle trains during the 1920s.

=== Renovations ===
As part of the 1968 Program for Action, the Pelham Line would have been extended to a modern terminal nearby in the Co-op City housing complex, and the Pelham Line would have been converted to B Division standards so lettered trains could use the line. As part of the plan, this station would no longer be the line's terminal. Because of the 1975 New York City fiscal crisis, most of the remaining projects did not have funding, so they were declined. If built, the extension would have been completed by the mid-1970s or early 1980s.

In 1981, the Metropolitan Transportation Authority listed the station among the 69 most deteriorated stations in the subway system.

The station's elevators were installed in December 1989, making the station one of the earliest to comply with the Americans with Disabilities Act of 1990. The elevators were renovated from June 8, 2015 to April 2016, three months after work was expected to be completed.

== Station layout ==
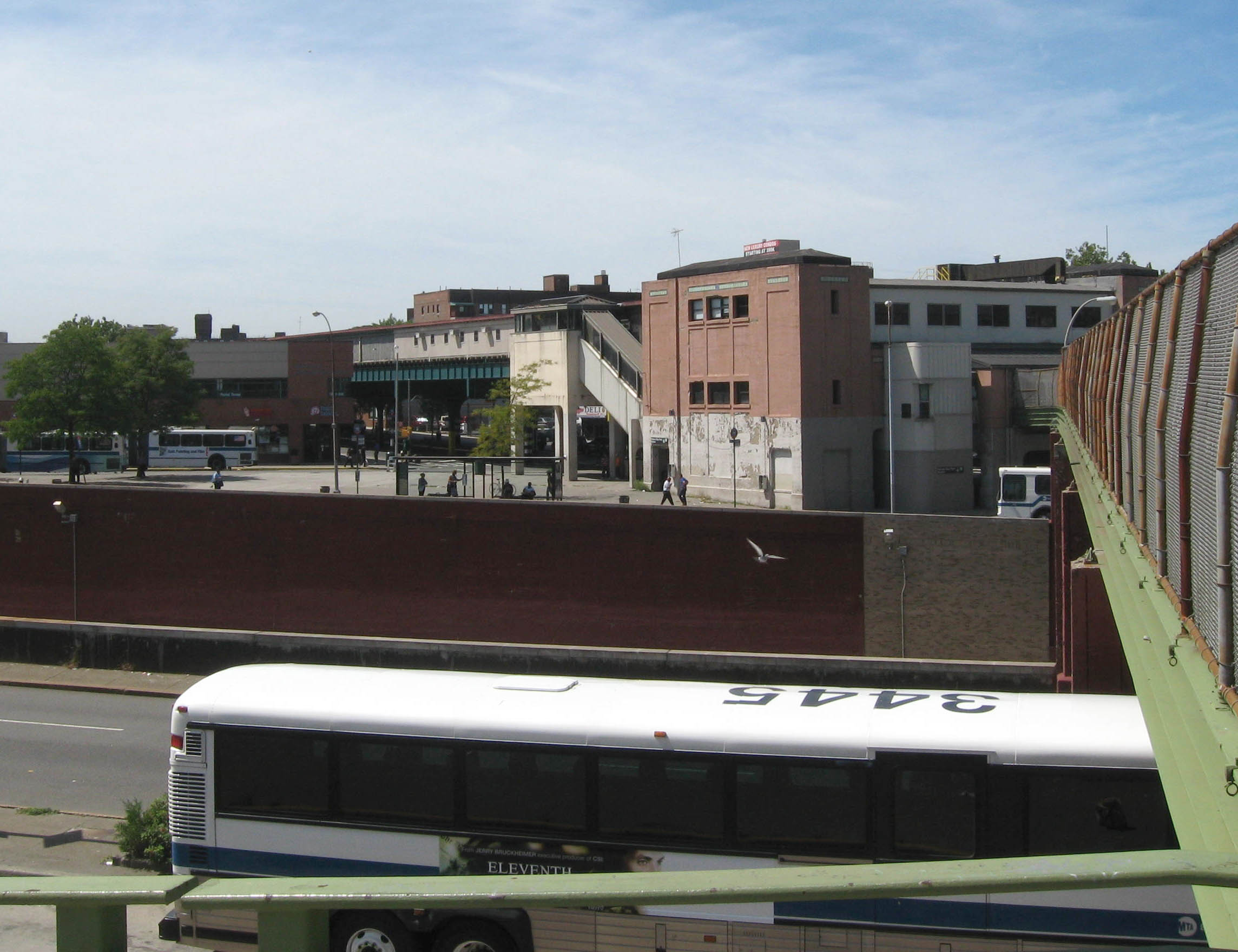
Pedestrian overpass and headhouse pictured in 2008

This is an elevated station which has two tracks, one island platform and two disused side platforms. The tracks end at bumper blocks at the north end of the platforms. The station was formerly set up as a Spanish solution with alighting passengers using the side platforms and boarding passengers using the island platform. Now all passengers use the island platform. The 6 local train serves the station at all times except rush hours in the peak direction, when the <6> express train serves the station instead. The station is the northern terminus for all service; the next stop to the south is Buhre Avenue.

During 2005, rooms were located on the side platforms for temporary crew use while the crew quarters at the north end of the station was rebuilt. At the south end is a staff-only crossover bridge between the center and west side platform. It also used to connect to the east side platform but that portion has been removed. There is also a tower and crew facilities at the south end. There are old style signs which are covered over on the main platform.

Pelham Bay Park is the only New York City Subway terminal that does not use numerical track labels, but rather track labels based on compass directions (i.e. East track, West track). Punch boxes exist, however, at the south end of the island platform where the corresponding track numbers (Track 1 and 2) are used.

=== Exits ===
Fare control is in the mezzanine below the platforms. There are two staircases, an escalator, and an elevator that lead to Westchester Avenue. There is also a pedestrian bridge from the station entrance that crosses the Bruckner Expressway and leads to Pelham Bay Park.

== The Taking of Pelham One Two Three superstition ==
In the novel The Taking of Pelham One Two Three by Morton Freedgood and its film adaptations (the 1974 original and the 1998 and 2009 remakes), the train that's hijacked leaves the Pelham Bay Park station at 1:23 pm, whence the callsign. After the 1974 film's release, the New York City Transit Authority banned any schedule of a train leaving this station at 1:23 am or 1:23 pm, realizing that it would become too much of a reminder to the public. Eventually this policy was rescinded, but due to the superstitions involved, dispatchers have continued to avoid scheduling a Manhattan-bound train to leave at 1:23.

== Nearby points of interest ==
- Pelham Bay Park
  - Bartow-Pell Mansion
  - Hunter Island
  - Orchard Beach
- City Island
- Co-op City
  - Bay Plaza Shopping Center

In the early 1960s, the Pelham Bay Park station was the closest station to the defunct Freedomland U.S.A. amusement park, now the site of Co-op City.
