= List of New York City Subway stations in Queens =

The current New York City Transit Authority rail system map; Queens is located to the center and right portion of the map.

The New York City Subway is a rapid transit system that serves four of the five boroughs of New York City in the U.S. state of New York: the Bronx, Brooklyn, Manhattan, and Queens. Operated by the New York City Transit Authority under the Metropolitan Transportation Authority of New York, the New York City Subway is the busiest rapid transit system in the United States and among the 20 busiest in the world. The system's 472 stations qualifies it to have one of the largest number of rapid transit stations in the world.

Three rapid transit companies merged in 1940 to create the present New York City Subway system: the Interborough Rapid Transit Company (IRT), the Brooklyn–Manhattan Transit Corporation (BMT), and the Independent Subway System (IND). All three former systems are present in Queens.

== History and description ==
Until 1915 most rapid transit in Queens consisted of streetcars, primarily those owned by affiliates of the Brooklyn Rapid Transit Company, but some included trolleys owned by the Long Island Consolidated Electrical Companies, a holding company co-owned by the Long Island Rail Road and Interborough Rapid Transit Company. Some steam dummy lines also entered Queens from Brooklyn, most notably the Atlantic Avenue Rapid Transit lines along the Atlantic Branch and part of the Main Line of the Long Island Rail Road. As far back as 1885, proposals existed for a tunnel between Midtown Manhattan and Long Island City designed to connect the Long Island Rail Road and the New York Central and Hudson River Railroad with a trolley line. Construction hazards, economic despair, and the transfer of ownership of this project delayed completion of the tunnel. This tunnel would eventually be known as the Steinway Tunnel.

The oldest subway line in Queens is the BMT Myrtle Avenue Line which was extended from Brooklyn into Ridgewood and Middle Village, replacing a steam dummy line. This was followed by the IRT Flushing Line, which had only one station in Long Island City, until it was extended with Dual Contracts to Astoria in 1916, Corona on April 21, 1917, and Downtown Flushing on January 2, 1928. The BMT Fulton Street Line extended from the City Line section of Brooklyn into Ozone Park and Richmond Hill on September 25, 1915. The same dual contracts project that brought about the extension of the IRT Flushing Line also lead to the opening of the BMT Astoria Line on February 1, 1917, as well as a connecting spur from the IRT Second Avenue Line over the Queensboro Bridge on July 23, 1917. The Astoria Line was the northernmost line owned by the BMT. The BMT Broadway-Brooklyn Line entered Queens from the Cypress Hills section of Brooklyn and ran through Woodhaven and Richmond Hill on May 28, 1917, and finally towards Downtown Jamaica on July 3, 1918.

The city-owned Independent Subway System installed two lines in Queens on August 19, 1933; the IND Crosstown Line ran south from Court Square in Long Island City to Greenpoint in Brooklyn, and was expanded to Downtown Brooklyn on July 1, 1937. The IND Queens Boulevard Line entered from Manhattan and ran to Jackson Heights, then to Kew Gardens on December 31, 1936, then to 169th Street in Jamaica on April 24, 1937. One last station at 179th Street was built on December 10, 1950. From 1939 to 1940, IND installed a spur off the Queens Boulevard Line called the IND World's Fair Line. The line was demolished after the closing of the 1939 World's Fair and the remnants can be found in the Jamaica Yard. A devastating fire on the trestle of the Rockaway Beach Branch of the Long Island Rail Road in Jamaica Bay in 1950 lead to the gradual closure of the branch, as well as part of the Far Rockaway Branch and the replacement of both by the IND Rockaway Line by 1956, replacing many but not all former LIRR stations. One other station (Far Rockaway–Mott Avenue) would be opened on February 21, 1958, and the LIRR replaced it with a new station three blocks east a month later. When the IND connected the Fulton Street Subway to the BMT Fulton Street Elevated on April 29, 1956, the former segments of the line in Ozone Park and Richmond Hill was officially "recaptured" by the IND.

The newest subway lines to be built were the Archer Avenue Lines, which opened on December 11, 1988, and replaced the demolished sections of the BMT Jamaica Line in Downtown Jamaica itself with an additional connecting spur to the IND Queens Boulevard Line, and the 63rd Street Lines on October 29, 1989 from the Upper East Side and Roosevelt Island.

== Lines and services ==
There are 81 New York City Subway stations in Queens, per the official count of the Metropolitan Transportation Authority; of these, 10 are express-local stations. If the 2 station complexes are counted as one station each, the number of stations is 78. In the table below, lines with colors next to them indicate trunk lines, which determine the colors that are used for services' route bullets and diamonds. The opening date refers to the opening of the first section of track for the line. In the "division" column, the current division is followed by the original division in parentheses.

Division	Line	Services	Stations in Queens	Opened	Continues to
B (IND)	63rd Street Line	"F" train "M" train	1	October 29, 1989	Manhattan
B (BMT)	Archer Avenue Lines	"J" train "Z" train	2 (1 express-local station, (Note: As the J/Z combined in a skip-stop service, an "express-local" station in this sense means both services stop at the station during the hours of skip-stop operation.) both shared with IND Archer Avenue Line)	December 11, 1988	—N/a
B (IND)	Archer Avenue Lines	"E" train	3 (2 shared with BMT Archer Avenue Line)	December 11, 1988	—N/a
B (BMT)	Astoria Line	"N" train "W" train	7 (1 shared with Flushing Line)	February 1, 1917	Manhattan
B (IND)	Crosstown Line	"G" train	2 (1 part of a station complex)	August 19, 1933	Brooklyn
A (IRT)	Flushing Line	"7" train "7" express train	18 (4 express-local stations, 1 shared with Astoria Line, 2 part of station complexes)	June 22, 1915	Manhattan
B (IND)	Fulton Street Line	"A" train	6	April 29, 1956	Brooklyn
B (BMT)	Jamaica Line	"J" train "Z" train	6 (1 express-local station)	May 28, 1917	Brooklyn
B (BMT)	Myrtle Avenue Line	"M" train	4	February 22, 1915	Brooklyn
B (IND)	Queens Boulevard Line	"E" train "F" train "F" express train "M" train "R" train	21 (4 express-local stations, 2 part of station complexes)	August 19, 1933	Manhattan
B (IND)	Rockaway Line	"A" train Rockaway Park Shuttle	14	June 28, 1956	—N/a

== Stations ==
Permanently closed subway stations, including those that have been demolished, are not included in the list below. Numerically named stations that are attached with a geographic location before them (Forest Hills–71st Avenue and Jamaica–179th Street) are listed under the geographic location name.

Station service legend
Stops all times	Stops 24 hours a day
Stops all times except late nights	Stops every day during daytime hours only
Stops late nights only	Stops every day during overnight hours only
Stops weekdays during the day	Stops during weekday daytime hours only
Stops all times except rush hours in the peak direction	Stops 24 hours a day, except during weekday rush hours in the peak direction
Stops daily except rush hours in the peak direction	Stops every day during daytime hours, except during weekday rush hours in the peak direction
Stops rush hours only	Stops during weekday rush hours only
Stops rush hours in the peak direction only	Stops during weekday rush hours in the peak direction only
Time period details
Disabled access	Station is compliant with the Americans with Disabilities Act
↑	Station is compliant with the Americans with Disabilities Act in the indicated direction only
↓	Station is compliant with the Americans with Disabilities Act in the indicated direction only
	Elevator access to mezzanine only

*	Station is part of a station complex
**	Transfer stations either between local and express services or that involve the terminus of a service on the same line; may also be part of a station complex as defined above
***	Multi-level or adjacent-platform transfer stations on different lines considered to be one station as classified by the MTA
†	Terminal of a service
*†, **† or ***†	Transfer stations and terminals
‡	Last station in Queens before service continues to Brooklyn or Manhattan
*‡, **‡, or ***‡	Last station in Queens and a transfer station
*†‡, **†‡, or ***†‡	Last station in Queens, a transfer station and a terminal

Station	Disabled access	Division	Line	Services	Opened
21st Street‡		B (IND)	Crosstown Line	G	August 19, 1933
21st Street–Queensbridge‡	Disabled access	B (IND)	63rd Street Line	F M	October 29, 1989
30th Avenue		B (BMT)	Astoria Line	N W	February 1, 1917
33rd Street–Rawson Street		A (IRT)	Flushing Line	7	April 21, 1917
36th Avenue		B (BMT)	Astoria Line	N W	February 1, 1917
36th Street		B (IND)	Queens Boulevard Line	E F M R	August 19, 1933
39th Avenue		B (BMT)	Astoria Line	N W	February 1, 1917
40th Street–Lowery Street		A (IRT)	Flushing Line	7	April 21, 1917
46th Street		B (IND)	Queens Boulevard Line	E F M R	August 19, 1933
46th Street–Bliss Street		A (IRT)	Flushing Line	7	April 21, 1917
52nd Street		A (IRT)	Flushing Line	7	April 21, 1917
61st Street–Woodside**	Disabled access	A (IRT)	Flushing Line	7 <7>	April 21, 1917
63rd Drive–Rego Park		B (IND)	Queens Boulevard Line	E F M R	December 31, 1936
65th Street		B (IND)	Queens Boulevard Line	E F M R	August 19, 1933
67th Avenue		B (IND)	Queens Boulevard Line	E F M R	December 31, 1936
69th Street		A (IRT)	Flushing Line	7	April 21, 1917
74th Street–Broadway* (Note: The 2 platform sets of the Jackson Heights–Roosevelt Avenue/74th Street station complex count as one station when compared to international standards.)	Disabled access	A (IRT)	Flushing Line	7	April 21, 1917
75th Avenue		B (IND)	Queens Boulevard Line	E F <F>	December 31, 1936
75th Street–Elderts Lane‡		B (BMT)	Jamaica Line	J Z	May 28, 1917
80th Street‡		B (IND)	Fulton Street Line	A	April 29, 1956
82nd Street–Jackson Heights		A (IRT)	Flushing Line	7	April 21, 1917
85th Street–Forest Parkway		B (BMT)	Jamaica Line	J	May 28, 1917
88th Street		B (IND)	Fulton Street Line	A	April 29, 1956
90th Street–Elmhurst Avenue		A (IRT)	Flushing Line	7	April 21, 1917
103rd Street–Corona Plaza		A (IRT)	Flushing Line	7	April 21, 1917
104th Street		B (IND)	Fulton Street Line	A	April 29, 1956
104th Street		B (BMT)	Jamaica Line	J Z	May 28, 1917
111th Street		A (IRT)	Flushing Line	7	October 13, 1925
111th Street		B (IND)	Fulton Street Line	A	April 29, 1956
111th Street		B (BMT)	Jamaica Line	J	May 28, 1917
121st Street		B (BMT)	Jamaica Line	J Z	July 3, 1918
169th Street		B (IND)	Queens Boulevard Line	F <F>	April 24, 1937
Aqueduct Racetrack (Note: The platform is on the northbound side only.)	↑	B (IND)	Rockaway Line	A	June 28, 1956
Aqueduct–North Conduit Avenue		B (IND)	Rockaway Line	A	June 28, 1956
Astoria Boulevard	Disabled access	B (BMT)	Astoria Line	N W	February 1, 1917
Astoria–Ditmars Boulevard†		B (BMT)	Astoria Line	N W	February 1, 1917
Beach 25th Street		B (IND)	Rockaway Line	A	June 28, 1956
Beach 36th Street		B (IND)	Rockaway Line	A	June 28, 1956
Beach 44th Street		B (IND)	Rockaway Line	A	June 28, 1956
Beach 60th Street		B (IND)	Rockaway Line	A	June 28, 1956
Beach 67th Street	Disabled access	B (IND)	Rockaway Line	A	June 28, 1956
Beach 90th Street		B (IND)	Rockaway Line	A S	June 28, 1956
Beach 98th Street		B (IND)	Rockaway Line	A S	June 28, 1956
Beach 105th Street		B (IND)	Rockaway Line	A S	June 28, 1956
Briarwood		B (IND)	Queens Boulevard Line	E F <F>	April 24, 1937
Broad Channel**†		B (IND)	Rockaway Line	A S	June 28, 1956
Broadway		B (BMT)	Astoria Line	N W	February 1, 1917
Court Square*‡ (Note: The 3 platform sets of the Court Square–23rd Street station complex count as one station when compared to international standards.)	Disabled access	A (IRT)	Flushing Line	7 <7>	November 5, 1916
Court Square*†	Disabled access	B (IND)	Crosstown Line	G	August 19, 1933
Court Square–23rd Street*‡		B (IND)	Queens Boulevard Line	E F <F>	August 28, 1939
Elmhurst Avenue		B (IND)	Queens Boulevard Line	E F M R	December 31, 1936
Far Rockaway–Mott Avenue†	Disabled access	B (IND)	Rockaway Line	A	January 16, 1958
Flushing–Main Street†	Disabled access	A (IRT)	Flushing Line	7 <7>	January 21, 1928
Forest Avenue		B (BMT)	Myrtle Avenue Line	M	February 22, 1915
Forest Hills–71st Avenue**†	Disabled access	B (IND)	Queens Boulevard Line	E F <F> M R	December 31, 1936
Fresh Pond Road		B (BMT)	Myrtle Avenue Line	M	February 22, 1915
Grand Avenue–Newtown		B (IND)	Queens Boulevard Line	E F M R	December 31, 1936
Howard Beach–JFK Airport	Disabled access	B (IND)	Rockaway Line	A	June 28, 1956
Hunters Point Avenue		A (IRT)	Flushing Line	7 <7>	February 15, 1916
Jackson Heights–Roosevelt Avenue**	Disabled access	B (IND)	Queens Boulevard Line	E F <F> M R	August 19, 1933
Jamaica Center–York College***†	Disabled access		Archer Avenue lines	E J Z	December 11, 1988
Jamaica–179th Street†	Disabled access	B (IND)	Queens Boulevard Line	E F <F>	December 10, 1950
Jamaica–Van Wyck	Disabled access	B (IND)	Archer Avenue Line	E	December 11, 1988
Junction Boulevard**	Disabled access	A (IRT)	Flushing Line	7 <7>	April 21, 1917
Kew Gardens–Union Turnpike**	Disabled access	B (IND)	Queens Boulevard Line	E F <F>	December 31, 1936
Mets–Willets Point**†	↑ (Note: The Mets–Willets Point station is disability-accessible on the northbound side platform only. Northbound local trains will open their doors on this platform during New York Mets game days and special events only.)	A (IRT)	Flushing Line	7 <7>	May 14, 1927
Middle Village–Metropolitan Avenue†	Disabled access	B (BMT)	Myrtle Avenue Line	M	February 22, 1915
Northern Boulevard	Disabled access	B (IND)	Queens Boulevard Line	E F M R	August 19, 1933
Ozone Park–Lefferts Boulevard†	Disabled access	B (IND)	Fulton Street Line	A	April 29, 1956
Parsons Boulevard**		B (IND)	Queens Boulevard Line	E F <F>	April 24, 1937
Queens Plaza**	Disabled access	B (IND)	Queens Boulevard Line	E F <F> R	August 19, 1933
Queensboro Plaza***‡	Disabled access	A (IRT), B (BMT)	Astoria Line (BMT), Flushing Line (IRT)	7 <7> N W	November 5, 1916
Rockaway Boulevard* (Note: The transfer at Rockaway Boulevard is between A trains going to/from Ozone Park–Lefferts Boulevard and A trains going to/from Far Rockaway–Mott Avenue or Rockaway Park–Beach 116th Street.)	Disabled access	B (IND)	Fulton Street Line	A	April 29, 1956
Rockaway Park–Beach 116th Street†	Disabled access	B (IND)	Rockaway Line	A S	June 28, 1956
Seneca Avenue‡		B (BMT)	Myrtle Avenue Line	M	February 22, 1915
Steinway Street		B (IND)	Queens Boulevard Line	E F M R	August 19, 1933
Sutphin Boulevard		B (IND)	Queens Boulevard Line	F <F>	April 24, 1937
Sutphin Boulevard–Archer Avenue–JFK Airport***	Disabled access		Archer Avenue lines	E J Z	December 11, 1988
Vernon Boulevard–Jackson Avenue‡		A (IRT)	Flushing Line	7 <7>	June 22, 1915
Woodhaven Boulevard**	Disabled access	B (BMT)	Jamaica Line	J Z	May 28, 1917
Woodhaven Boulevard		B (IND)	Queens Boulevard Line	E F M R	December 31, 1936

== See also ==
- New York City Subway stations
- List of New York City Subway stations
- List of New York City Subway transfer stations
- List of New York City Subway terminals
- List of closed New York City Subway stations
- List of Staten Island Railway stations
- Accessibility of the Metropolitan Transportation Authority
- List of New York City Subway stations in the Bronx
- List of New York City Subway stations in Brooklyn
- List of New York City Subway stations in Manhattan
