= List of New York City Subway stations in Manhattan =

The current New York City Transit Authority rail system map; Manhattan is located on the left-center portion of the map.

The New York City Subway is a rapid transit system that serves four of the five boroughs of New York City in the U.S. state of New York: the Bronx, Brooklyn, Manhattan, and Queens. Operated by the New York City Transit Authority under the Metropolitan Transportation Authority of New York, the New York City Subway is the busiest rapid transit system in the United States and among the 20 busiest in the world. The system's 472 stations qualifies it to have the largest number of rapid transit stations in the world.

Three rapid transit companies merged in 1940 to create the present New York City Subway system: the Interborough Rapid Transit Company (IRT), the Brooklyn–Manhattan Transit Corporation (BMT), and the Independent Subway System (IND). All three former systems are present in Manhattan.

== History and description ==
Before subways were built, Manhattan's mass transit system was provided by elevated railways. The first being the West Side and Yonkers Patent Railway which built the IRT Ninth Avenue Line in 1868, and the second being the Gilbert Elevated Railway, which built the IRT Sixth Avenue Line. The WS&YP went bankrupt in 1871 and was replaced by the New York Elevated Railroad, which would later build the IRT Third Avenue Line. The Third Avenue El originally terminated at Grand Central Depot, until it was expanded uptown, transforming the segment into a spur. Meanwhile, the Gilbert El was reorganized as the Metropolitan Elevated Railway and was permitted to build the IRT Second Avenue Line in 1875. All four lines were acquired by the Manhattan Elevated Railway in 1879. They also built a spur from the 3rd and 2nd Avenue lines leading to the East 34th Street Ferry Landing. In 1886, the Suburban Rapid Transit Company extended the Third Avenue El into the Bronx. Manhattan Elevated acquired the SRT in 1891, and the entire railroad was acquired by the Interborough Rapid Transit Company.

An early attempt at a subway system included the Beach Pneumatic Transit Company. The subway was only located in the vicinity of the Rogers Peet Building along Broadway between Warren and Murray Streets. The line had only one car and one station beneath the aforementioned building. With no support for the system from Mayor William Tweed, the line had limited use and ran only between 1870 and 1873 before being abandoned and sealed. The line was rediscovered during construction of the City Hall Station along the BMT Broadway Line in 1912.

The only station in Manhattan not to be used by the IRT or its predecessors was Park Row (BMT station) at the west end of the Brooklyn Bridge which originally served cable cars from the New York and Brooklyn Bridge Railway, and later elevated trains from the Kings County Elevated Railway and Brooklyn Union Elevated Railroad, which were both acquired by the Brooklyn Rapid Transit Company, and later the Brooklyn–Manhattan Transit Corporation. A BMT station also existed on the Manhattan side of the Williamsburg Bridge, but this was exclusively for streetcars.

Interborough Rapid Transit built the first subway in 1904. The line consisted of what is today the IRT Lexington Avenue Line south of 42nd Street, the 42nd Street Shuttle and the IRT Broadway–Seventh Avenue Line between 42nd and 145th Streets. The line was extended less than a month later to 157th Street, and the Lenox Avenue Spur was also built northeast of 96th Street, with its spur to the IRT White Plains Road Line in the Bronx. The line would be expanded again to 221st Street in 1906, and finally Van Cortlandt Park in the Bronx in 1908. In the 1910s and 1920s, the Dual Contracts brought expansion and improvements on subways and els for both the IRT and BRT in four of the five boroughs of the city. In the case of Manhattan, it converted the original line into the "H system" which brought the Broadway-Seventh Avenue Line south of 42nd Street to South Ferry, with a spur to Downtown Brooklyn via the Clark Street Tunnel, and the Lexington Avenue Line north of 42nd Street through 125th Street and the Lexington Avenue Tunnel into the Jerome Avenue and Pelham lines in the Bronx. It also helped extend the IRT Flushing Line to Times Square, created the BMT Nassau Street Line, the BMT Broadway Line, a subway under 14th Street leading to the Canarsie Line in Brooklyn, a spur of the 2nd Avenue el across the Queensboro Bridge into Long Island City, and an extension of the 9th Avenue El between the Polo Grounds via the Putnam Railroad Bridge, leading to the Jerome Avenue Line at 164th Street near Yankee Stadium.

Also during the 1920s, New York City Mayor John Hylan was planning a new city-owned "Independent" Subway System to compete with the IRT and BRT, later BMT. Within Manhattan, the first lines built in the 1930s were the IND Eighth Avenue Line and the IND Sixth Avenue Line, despite the presence of the IRT Sixth Avenue El, and the Hudson and Manhattan Railroad along the same street. Extensions of these lines included the IND Fulton Street Line leading to Brooklyn, IND Queens Boulevard Line leading to Queens, and the IND Concourse Line leading to the Bronx.

Eventually, some growing disdain for the noise of the els, and the fact that the subways were rendering them obsolete lead to their closure. The Sixth Avenue El was closed in 1938, the Second Avenue el closed north of 59th Street in 1940 and north of Chatham Square in 1942. The Ninth Avenue el closed in 1940, except for the segment northeast of 155th Street when it became the southern terminus of the Polo Grounds Shuttle until 1958. The Third Avenue el closed in 1955 but remained opened in the Bronx until 1973. The newest subway lines to be built were the 63rd Street Lines in 1989 to Roosevelt Island and Long Island City, and the western extension of the IRT Flushing Line to 34th Street, near Hudson Yards, on September 13, 2015. The first phase of the IND Second Avenue Line, which was planned as far back as 1919, opened in 2017, with provisions for future expansion south to Hanover Square and north to 125th Street.

Although many east-west numbered streets in Manhattan, as well as Houston Street, are prefixed with either "East" or "West," most subway stations are named without the prefix, i.e. 33rd Street instead of East 33rd Street. The exception is West Fourth Street–Washington Square. The IND had proposed an extension of the Sixth Avenue Line from Second Avenue into Brooklyn. This line would have had a station stop at South Fourth Street in Brooklyn; the station shell was built at the Broadway IND Crosstown Line station and is now sealed up. Thus, West Fourth Street was named to eliminate this confusion should it arose.

== Lines and services ==
There are 151 New York City Subway stations in Manhattan, (Note: There are 154 stations if one is to use MTA counting standards, but the MTA only lists 151 stations in Manhattan. It is to be assumed that two complexes, with two stations each, were both counted as one station during the official count. Several station complexes are counted as one station by both MTA and international standards.) per the official count of the Metropolitan Transportation Authority (MTA); of these, 32 are express-local stations. (Note: The Canal Street BMT Broadway Line stations and the Chambers Street–World Trade Center express and local stations are not included in the counts of express-local stations because the MTA classifies each set of stations as separate stations.) (Note: This number includes the bi-level West Fourth Street–Washington Square and 145th Street/St. Nicholas Avenue stations, both levels of which have express-local platforms.) If the 18 station complexes (Note: This excludes the Lexington Avenue–63rd Street transfer, which is counted as one station by both MTA and international standards since both are located along the 63rd Street Lines.) are counted as one station each, the number of stations is 121. In the table below, lines with colors next to them indicate trunk lines, which determine the colors that are used for services' route bullets and diamonds. The opening date refers to the opening of the first section of track for the line. In the "division" column, the current division is followed by the original division in parentheses.

| Division | Line | Services | Stations in Manhattan | Opened | Continues to |
|---|---|---|---|---|---|
| B (IND) | Second Avenue Line | "N" train "Q" train "R" train | 3 | January 1, 2017 | —N/a |
| B (IND) | Sixth Avenue Line | "B" train "D" train "F" train "F" express train "M" train | 13 (6 express-local stations, 5 part of station complexes, 1 shared with Eighth Avenue Line, 1 shared with Queens Boulevard Line) | January 1, 1936 | Brooklyn |
| B (IND) | Eighth Avenue Line | "A" train "B" train "C" train "D" train "E" train | 30 (9 express-local stations, 7 part of station complexes, 1 shared with Concourse Line, 1 shared with Queens Boulevard Line, 1 shared with Sixth Avenue Line) | September 10, 1932 | Brooklyn |
| A (IRT) | 42nd Street Line | 42nd Street Shuttle | 2 (both part of station complexes) | October 27, 1904 | —N/a |
| B (BMT) | 63rd Street Line | "N" train "Q" train "R" train | 1 (shared with IND 63rd Street Line) | October 29, 1989 (Note: Although the Second Avenue Subway opened on January 1, 2017, the single station on the BMT 63rd Street Line had exclusively served IND trains since 1989. Before 2017, regular service had operated on the line between 1998 and 1999.) | —N/a |
| B (IND) | 63rd Street Line | "F" train "M" train | 2 (1 shared with BMT 63rd Street Line) | October 29, 1989 | Queens |
| B (BMT) | Broadway Line | "N" train "Q" train "R" train "W" train | 17 (4 express-local stations, 8 part of station complexes) | September 4, 1917 | Brooklyn, Queens |
| A (IRT) | Broadway–Seventh Avenue Line | "1" train "2" train "3" train | 38 (6 express-local stations, 7 part of station complexes) | October 27, 1904 | the Bronx, Brooklyn |
| B (BMT) | Canarsie Line (14th Street Crosstown) | "L" train | 5 (3 part of station complexes) | June 30, 1924 | Brooklyn |
| B (IND) | Concourse Line | "B" train "D" train | 2 (1 express-local station, 1 shared with Eighth Avenue Line) | July 1, 1933 | the Bronx |
| A (IRT) | Flushing Line | "7" train "7" express train | 4 (3 part of station complexes) | June 22, 1915 | Queens |
| A (IRT) | Lenox Avenue Line | "2" train "3" train | 6 | November 23, 1904 | the Bronx |
| A (IRT) | Lexington Avenue Line | "4" train "5" train "6" train "6" express train | 23 (6 express-local stations, 8 part of station complexes) | October 27, 1904 | the Bronx, Brooklyn |
| B (BMT) | Nassau Street Line | "J" train "M" train "Z" train | 6 (4 part of station complexes) | August 4, 1913 | Brooklyn |
| B (IND) | Queens Boulevard Line (53rd Street Crosstown) | "E" train "F" train "F" express train | 4 (1 part of a station complex, 1 shared with Sixth Avenue Line, 1 shared with Eighth Avenue Line) | August 19, 1933 | Queens |

== Stations ==
Permanently closed subway stations, including those that have been demolished, are not included in the list below. Numerically named stations that are attached with a geographic location before them (Grand Central–42nd Street, Times Square–42nd Street, 110th Street–Malcolm X Plaza, Harlem–148th Street, Inwood–207th Street, and Marble Hill–225th Street) are listed under the geographic location name.

The Times Square–42nd Street and 42nd Street–Port Authority Bus Terminal stations, despite being a single complex, have their own articles. In addition, the 42nd Street–Bryant Park/Fifth Avenue station has its own article, and is a separate complex from the Times Square–42nd Street/Port Authority Bus Terminal complex, although the complexes are connected within fare control during the daytime.

Station service legend
| Stops all times | Stops 24 hours a day |
| Stops all times except late nights | Stops every day during daytime hours only |
| Stops late nights only | Stops every day during overnight hours only |
| Stops weekdays during the day | Stops during weekday daytime hours only |
| Stops all times except rush hours in the peak direction | Stops 24 hours a day, except during weekday rush hours in the peak direction |
| Stops daily except rush hours in the peak direction | Stops every day during daytime hours, except during weekday rush hours in the peak direction |
| Stops rush hours only | Stops during weekday rush hours only |
| Stops rush hours in the peak direction only | Stops during weekday rush hours in the peak direction only |
Time period details
| Disabled access | Station is compliant with the Americans with Disabilities Act |
| ↑ | Station is compliant with the Americans with Disabilities Act in the indicated direction only |
| ↓ | Station is compliant with the Americans with Disabilities Act in the indicated direction only |
| | Elevator access to mezzanine only |

| * | Station is part of a station complex |
| ** | Transfer stations either between local and express services or that involve the terminus of a service on the same line; may also be part of a station complex as defined above |
| *** | Multi-level or adjacent-platform transfer stations on different lines considered to be one station as classified by the MTA |
| † | Terminal of a service |
| *†, **† or ***† | Transfer stations and terminals |
| ‡ | Last station in Manhattan before service continues to the Bronx, Brooklyn or Queens |
| *‡, **‡, or ***‡ | Last station in Manhattan and a transfer station |
| *†‡, **†‡, or ***†‡ | Last station in Manhattan, a transfer station and a terminal |

| Station | Disabled access | Division | Line | Services | Opened |
|---|---|---|---|---|---|
| First Avenue‡ | Disabled access | B (BMT) | Canarsie Line | L | June 30, 1924 |
| Second Avenue | | B (IND) | Sixth Avenue Line | F <F> | January 1, 1936 |
| Third Avenue | | B (BMT) | Canarsie Line | L | June 30, 1924 |
| Fifth Avenue* (Note: The 2 platform sets of the 42nd Street–Bryant Park/Fifth Avenue station complex count as one station when compared with international standards.) | | A (IRT) | Flushing Line | 7 <7> | March 22, 1926 |
| Fifth Avenue/53rd Street | | B (IND) | Queens Boulevard Line | E F <F> | August 19, 1933 |
| Fifth Avenue–59th Street | | B (BMT) | Broadway Line | N R W | August 1, 1920 |
| Sixth Avenue* (Note: The 3 platform sets of the 14th Street/Sixth Avenue station complex count as one station when compared with international standards.) | Disabled access | B (BMT) | Canarsie Line | L | June 30, 1924 |
| Seventh Avenue*** | | B (IND) | Sixth Avenue Line, Queens Boulevard Line | B D E | August 19, 1933 |
| Eighth Avenue*† (Note: The 2 platform sets of the 14th Street/Eighth Avenue station complex count as one station when compared with international standards.) | Disabled access | B (BMT) | Canarsie Line | L | May 30, 1931 |
| Eighth Street–New York University | | B (BMT) | Broadway Line | N Q R W | September 4, 1917 |
| 14th Street* | Disabled access | B (IND) | Sixth Avenue Line | F <F> M | December 15, 1940 |
| 14th Street** | Disabled access | B (IND) | Eighth Avenue Line | A C E | September 10, 1932 |
| 14th Street** | Disabled access | A (IRT) | Broadway–Seventh Avenue Line | 1; 2; 3 | July 1, 1918 |
| 14th Street–Union Square** (Note: The 3 platform sets of the 14th Street–Union Square station complex count as one station when compared with international standards.) | Disabled access | B (BMT) | Broadway Line | N Q R W | September 4, 1917 |
| 14th Street–Union Square* | Disabled access | B (BMT) | Canarsie Line | L | June 30, 1924 |
| 14th Street–Union Square** | | A (IRT) | Lexington Avenue Line | 4; 5; 6 <6> | October 27, 1904 |
| 18th Street | | A (IRT) | Broadway–Seventh Avenue Line | 1; 2 | July 1, 1918 |
| 23rd Street | | B (IND) | Sixth Avenue Line | F <F> M | December 15, 1940 |
| 23rd Street | | B (IND) | Eighth Avenue Line | A C E | September 10, 1932 |
| 23rd Street | | B (BMT) | Broadway Line | N Q R W | January 5, 1918 |
| 23rd Street | | A (IRT) | Broadway–Seventh Avenue Line | 1; 2 | July 1, 1918 |
| 23rd Street–Baruch College | Disabled access | A (IRT) | Lexington Avenue Line | 4; 6 <6> | October 27, 1904 |
| 28th Street | | B (BMT) | Broadway Line | N Q R W | January 5, 1918 |
| 28th Street | | A (IRT) | Broadway–Seventh Avenue Line | 1; 2 | July 1, 1918 |
| 28th Street | ↓ | A (IRT) | Lexington Avenue Line | 4; 6 <6> | October 27, 1904 |
| 33rd Street | | A (IRT) | Lexington Avenue Line | 4; 6 <6> | October 27, 1904 |
| 34th Street–Herald Square** (Note: The 2 platform sets of the 34th Street–Herald Square station complex count as one station when compared with international standards.) | Disabled access | B (IND) | Sixth Avenue Line | B D F <F> M | December 15, 1940 |
| 34th Street–Herald Square** | Disabled access | B (BMT) | Broadway Line | N Q R W | January 5, 1918 |
| 34th Street–Hudson Yards† | Disabled access | A (IRT) | Flushing Line | 7 <7> | September 13, 2015 |
| 34th Street–Penn Station** (Note: In both of the stations named "34th Street–Penn Station," the single inner island platform for express trains is separated from the two outer side platforms for local trains. Transfers between local and express trains can be done by walking through a crossunder, but it is more convenient to do so at other adjacent stations. The two sets of stations do not have a free connection with each other and do not form a station complex.) | Disabled access | B (IND) | Eighth Avenue Line | A C E | September 10, 1932 |
| 34th Street–Penn Station** | Disabled access | A (IRT) | Broadway–Seventh Avenue Line | 1; 2; 3 | June 3, 1917 |
| 42nd Street–Bryant Park* | | B (IND) | Sixth Avenue Line | B D F <F> M | December 15, 1940 |
| 42nd Street–Port Authority Bus Terminal** (Note: The 5 platform sets of the Times Square–42nd Street/Port Authority Bus Terminal station complex count as one station when compared with international standards.) | Disabled access | B (IND) | Eighth Avenue Line | A C E | September 10, 1932 |
| 47th–50th Streets–Rockefeller Center** | Disabled access | B (IND) | Sixth Avenue Line | B D F <F> M | December 15, 1940 |
| 49th Street | ↑ | B (BMT) | Broadway Line | N Q R W | July 10, 1919 |
| 50th Street*** (Note: There is no free transfer between trains traveling in the opposite direction.) | ↓ | B (IND) | Eighth Avenue Line, Queens Boulevard Line | A C E | September 10, 1932 |
| 50th Street | | A (IRT) | Broadway–Seventh Avenue Line | 1; 2 | October 27, 1904 |
| 51st Street* (Note: The 2 platform sets of the Lexington Avenue/51st Street station complex count as one station when compared with international standards.) | Disabled access | A (IRT) | Lexington Avenue Line | 4; 6 <6> | July 17, 1918 |
| 57th Street | Disabled access | B (IND) | Sixth Avenue Line | F M | July 1, 1968 |
| 57th Street–Seventh Avenue**† | Disabled access | B (BMT) | Broadway Line | N Q R W | July 10, 1919 |
| 59th Street** (Note: The 2 platform sets of the Lexington Avenue/59th Street station complex count as one station when compared with international standards.) (Note: An out-of-system connection between Lexington Avenue–63rd Street and the Lexington Avenue/59th Street station complex can be made with a MetroCard. As the transfer requires leaving and reentering fare control, the Lexington Avenue–63rd Street station is not officially included as part of a station complex.) | | A (IRT) | Lexington Avenue Line | 4; 5; 6 <6> | July 17, 1918 |
| 59th Street–Columbus Circle** (Note: The 2 platform sets of the 59th Street–Columbus Circle station complex count as one station when compared with international standards.) | Disabled access | B (IND) | Eighth Avenue Line | A B C D | September 10, 1932 |
| 59th Street–Columbus Circle* | Disabled access | A (IRT) | Broadway–Seventh Avenue Line | 1; 2 | October 27, 1904 |
| 66th Street–Lincoln Center | Disabled access | A (IRT) | Broadway–Seventh Avenue Line | 1; 2 | October 27, 1904 |
| 68th Street–Hunter College | Disabled access | A (IRT) | Lexington Avenue Line | 4; 6 <6> | July 17, 1918 |
| 72nd Street | Disabled access | B (IND) | Second Avenue Line | N Q R | January 1, 2017 |
| 72nd Street | | B (IND) | Eighth Avenue Line | A B C | September 10, 1932 |
| 72nd Street** | Disabled access | A (IRT) | Broadway–Seventh Avenue Line | 1; 2; 3 | October 27, 1904 |
| 77th Street | | A (IRT) | Lexington Avenue Line | 4; 6 <6> | July 17, 1918 |
| 79th Street | | A (IRT) | Broadway–Seventh Avenue Line | 1; 2 | October 27, 1904 |
| 81st Street–Museum of Natural History | | B (IND) | Eighth Avenue Line | A B C | September 10, 1932 |
| 86th Street | Disabled access | B (IND) | Second Avenue Line | N Q R | January 1, 2017 |
| 86th Street | | B (IND) | Eighth Avenue Line | A B C | September 10, 1932 |
| 86th Street | | A (IRT) | Broadway–Seventh Avenue Line | 1; 2 | October 27, 1904 |
| 86th Street** | ↑ (Note: At the 86th Street station on the Lexington Avenue Line, only the northbound local platform is accessible.) | A (IRT) | Lexington Avenue Line | 4; 5; 6 <6> | July 17, 1918 |
| 96th Street† | Disabled access | B (IND) | Second Avenue Line | N Q R | January 1, 2017 |
| 96th Street | | B (IND) | Eighth Avenue Line | A B C | September 10, 1932 |
| 96th Street** | Disabled access | A (IRT) | Broadway–Seventh Avenue Line | 1; 2; 3 | October 27, 1904 |
| 96th Street | | A (IRT) | Lexington Avenue Line | 4; 6 <6> | July 17, 1918 |
| 103rd Street | | B (IND) | Eighth Avenue Line | A B C | September 10, 1932 |
| 103rd Street | | A (IRT) | Broadway–Seventh Avenue Line | 1 | October 27, 1904 |
| 103rd Street | | A (IRT) | Lexington Avenue Line | 4; 6 <6> | July 17, 1918 |
| 110th Street | | A (IRT) | Lexington Avenue Line | 4; 6 <6> | July 17, 1918 |
| 110th Street–Malcolm X Plaza | | A (IRT) | Lenox Avenue Line | 2; 3 | November 23, 1904 |
| 116th Street | | B (IND) | Eighth Avenue Line | A B C | September 10, 1932 |
| 116th Street | | A (IRT) | Lenox Avenue Line | 2; 3 | November 23, 1904 |
| 116th Street | | A (IRT) | Lexington Avenue Line | 4; 6 <6> | July 17, 1918 |
| 116th Street–Columbia University | | A (IRT) | Broadway–Seventh Avenue Line | 1 | October 27, 1904 |
| 125th Street** | Disabled access | B (IND) | Eighth Avenue Line | A B C D | September 10, 1932 |
| 125th Street | | A (IRT) | Broadway–Seventh Avenue Line | 1 | October 27, 1904 |
| 125th Street | | A (IRT) | Lenox Avenue Line | 2; 3 | November 23, 1904 |
| 125th Street**‡ | Disabled access | A (IRT) | Lexington Avenue Line | 4; 5; 6 <6> | July 17, 1918 |
| 135th Street | | B (IND) | Eighth Avenue Line | A B C | September 10, 1932 |
| 135th Street‡ | Disabled access | A (IRT) | Lenox Avenue Line | 2; 3 | November 23, 1904 |
| 137th Street–City College | Disabled access | A (IRT) | Broadway–Seventh Avenue Line | 1 | October 27, 1904 |
| 145th Street***†‡ | | B (IND) | Eighth Avenue Line, Concourse Line | A B C D | September 10, 1932 |
| 145th Street | | A (IRT) | Broadway–Seventh Avenue Line | 1 | October 27, 1904 |
| 145th Street | | A (IRT) | Lenox Avenue Line | 3 | November 23, 1904 |
| 155th Street | | B (IND) | Eighth Avenue Line | A C | September 10, 1932 |
| 155th Street‡ | | B (IND) | Concourse Line | B D | July 1, 1933 |
| 157th Street | | A (IRT) | Broadway–Seventh Avenue Line | 1 | November 12, 1904 |
| 163rd Street–Amsterdam Avenue | | B (IND) | Eighth Avenue Line | A C | September 10, 1932 |
| 168th Street**† (Note: The 2 platform sets of the 168th Street station complex count as one station when compared with international standards.) | Disabled access | B (IND) | Eighth Avenue Line | A C | September 10, 1932 |
| 168th Street* | | A (IRT) | Broadway–Seventh Avenue Line | 1 | April 14, 1906 |
| 175th Street | Disabled access | B (IND) | Eighth Avenue Line | A | September 10, 1932 |
| 181st Street | Disabled access | B (IND) | Eighth Avenue Line | A | September 10, 1932 |
| 181st Street | | A (IRT) | Broadway–Seventh Avenue Line | 1 | May 30, 1906 |
| 190th Street | | B (IND) | Eighth Avenue Line | A | September 10, 1932 |
| 191st Street | | A (IRT) | Broadway–Seventh Avenue Line | 1 | January 14, 1911 |
| 207th Street | | A (IRT) | Broadway–Seventh Avenue Line | 1 | April 1, 1907 |
| 215th Street | | A (IRT) | Broadway–Seventh Avenue Line | 1 | March 12, 1906 |
| Astor Place | | A (IRT) | Lexington Avenue Line | 4; 6 <6> | October 27, 1904 |
| Bleecker Street* (Note: The 2 platform sets of the Broadway–Lafayette Street/Bleecker Street station complex count as one station when compared with international standards.) | Disabled access | A (IRT) | Lexington Avenue Line | 4; 6 <6> | October 27, 1904 |
| Bowery | | B (BMT) | Nassau Street Line | J Z | August 4, 1913 |
| Bowling Green**†‡ | Disabled access | A (IRT) | Lexington Avenue Line | 4; 5 | July 10, 1905 |
| Broad Street**†‡ | | B (BMT) | Nassau Street Line | J Z | May 30, 1931 |
| Broadway–Lafayette Street** | Disabled access | B (IND) | Sixth Avenue Line | B D F <F> M | January 1, 1936 |
| Brooklyn Bridge–City Hall**† (Note: The 2 platform sets of the Brooklyn Bridge–City Hall/Chambers Street station complex count as one station when compared with international standards.) | Disabled access | A (IRT) | Lexington Avenue Line | 4; 5; 6 <6> | October 27, 1904 |
| Canal Street** | | B (IND) | Eighth Avenue Line | A C E | September 10, 1932 |
| Canal Street* (Note: The 4 platform sets of the Canal Street station complex count as one station when compared with international standards.) (Note: The BMT Broadway Line at Canal Street splits into the Main Line along Broadway and the Manhattan Bridge Line along Canal Street, creating two sets of platforms. The latter station opened earlier and was originally named "Broadway." Therefore, the MTA defines the platforms as two separate stations.) | | B (BMT) | Broadway Line | N R W | January 5, 1918 |
| Canal Street*‡ | | B (BMT) | Broadway Line | N Q | September 4, 1917 |
| Canal Street | | A (IRT) | Broadway–Seventh Avenue Line | 1; 2 | July 1, 1918 |
| Canal Street* | Disabled access | A (IRT) | Lexington Avenue Line | 4; 6 <6> | October 27, 1904 |
| Canal Street* | | B (BMT) | Nassau Street Line | J Z | August 4, 1913 |
| Cathedral Parkway–110th Street | | B (IND) | Eighth Avenue Line | A B C | September 10, 1932 |
| Cathedral Parkway–110th Street | | A (IRT) | Broadway–Seventh Avenue Line | 1 | October 27, 1904 |
| Chambers Street* (Note: The 4 platform sets of the Chambers Street–World Trade Center/Park Place/Cortlandt Street station complex count as one station when compared with international standards.) | | B (IND) | Eighth Avenue Line | A C | September 10, 1932 |
| Chambers Street** | Disabled access | A (IRT) | Broadway–Seventh Avenue Line | 1; 2; 3 | July 1, 1918 |
| Chambers Street* | Disabled access | B (BMT) | Nassau Street Line | J Z | August 4, 1913 |
| Christopher Street–Stonewall | | A (IRT) | Broadway–Seventh Avenue Line | 1; 2 | July 1, 1918 |
| City Hall | | B (BMT) | Broadway Line | N R W | January 5, 1918 |
| Cortlandt Street* | Disabled access | B (BMT) | Broadway Line | N R W | January 5, 1918 |
| Delancey Street* (Note: The 2 platform sets of the Delancey Street/Essex Street station complex count as one station when compared with international standards.) | | B (IND) | Sixth Avenue Line | F <F> | January 1, 1936 |
| Dyckman Street† | | B (IND) | Eighth Avenue Line | A | September 10, 1932 |
| Dyckman Street | Disabled access | A (IRT) | Broadway–Seventh Avenue Line | 1 | March 12, 1906 |
| East Broadway‡ | | B (IND) | Sixth Avenue Line | F <F> | January 1, 1936 |
| Essex Street*‡ | | B (BMT) | Nassau Street Line | J M Z | September 16, 1908 |
| Franklin Street | | A (IRT) | Broadway–Seventh Avenue Line | 1; 2 | July 1, 1918 |
| Fulton Street* (Note: The 4 platform sets of the Fulton Street station complex count as one station when compared with international standards. The Fulton Center was constructed as part of a reorganization of this complex.) | Disabled access | A (IRT) | Broadway–Seventh Avenue Line | 2; 3 | July 1, 1918 |
| Fulton Street* | Disabled access | A (IRT) | Lexington Avenue Line | 4; 5 | January 16, 1905 |
| Fulton Street*‡ | Disabled access | B (IND) | Eighth Avenue Line | A C | February 1, 1933 |
| Fulton Street* | Disabled access | B (BMT) | Nassau Street Line | J Z | May 30, 1931 |
| Grand Central–42nd Street** (Note: The 3 platform sets of the Grand Central–42nd Street station complex count as one station when compared with international standards.) | Disabled access | A (IRT) | Lexington Avenue Line | 4; 5; 6 <6> | July 17, 1918 |
| Grand Central*† | | A (IRT) | 42nd Street Shuttle | S | October 27, 1904 |
| Grand Central*‡ | Disabled access | A (IRT) | Flushing Line | 7 <7> | June 22, 1915 |
| Grand Street‡ | | B (IND) | Sixth Avenue Line | B D | November 26, 1967 |
| Harlem–148th Street† | Disabled access | A (IRT) | Lenox Avenue Line | 3 | May 13, 1968 |
| Houston Street | | A (IRT) | Broadway–Seventh Avenue Line | 1; 2 | July 1, 1918 |
| Inwood–207th Street† | Disabled access | B (IND) | Eighth Avenue Line | A | September 10, 1932 |
| Lexington Avenue/53rd Street*‡ | Disabled access | B (IND) | Queens Boulevard Line | E F <F> | August 19, 1933 |
| Lexington Avenue/59th Street*‡ | | B (BMT) | Broadway Line | N R W | August 1, 1920 |
| Lexington Avenue–63rd Street* | Disabled access | | 63rd Street lines | F M N Q R | October 29, 1989 |
| Marble Hill–225th Street‡ | | A (IRT) | Broadway–Seventh Avenue Line | 1 | January 14, 1907 |
| Park Place* | | A (IRT) | Broadway–Seventh Avenue Line | 2; 3 | July 1, 1918 |
| Prince Street | | B (BMT) | Broadway Line | N Q R W | September 4, 1917 |
| Rector Street | | B (BMT) | Broadway Line | N R W | January 5, 1918 |
| Rector Street | | A (IRT) | Broadway–Seventh Avenue Line | 1 | July 1, 1918 |
| Roosevelt Island‡ | Disabled access | B (IND) | 63rd Street Line | F M | October 29, 1989 |
| South Ferry***† (Note: The 2 platform sets of the South Ferry/Whitehall Street station complex count as one station when compared with international standards.) | Disabled access | A (IRT) | Broadway–Seventh Avenue Line | 1 | March 16, 2009 |
| Spring Street | ↓ | B (IND) | Eighth Avenue Line | A C E | September 10, 1932 |
| Spring Street | | A (IRT) | Lexington Avenue Line | 4; 6 <6> | October 27, 1904 |
| Times Square*† | Disabled access | A (IRT) | 42nd Street Shuttle | S | October 27, 1904 |
| Times Square–42nd Street** | Disabled access | A (IRT) | Flushing Line | 7 <7> | March 14, 1927 |
| Times Square–42nd Street** | Disabled access | B (BMT) | Broadway Line | N Q R W | January 5, 1918 |
| Times Square–42nd Street** | Disabled access | A (IRT) | Broadway–Seventh Avenue Line | 1; 2; 3 | June 3, 1917 |
| Wall Street‡ | | A (IRT) | Broadway–Seventh Avenue Line | 2; 3 | July 1, 1918 |
| Wall Street | | A (IRT) | Lexington Avenue Line | 4; 5 | June 12, 1905 |
| West Fourth Street–Washington Square*** | Disabled access | B (IND) | Sixth Avenue Line, Eighth Avenue Line | A B C D E F <F> M | September 10, 1932 |
| Whitehall Street–South Ferry***‡ | | B (BMT) | Broadway Line | N R W | January 5, 1918 |
| World Trade Center*† | Disabled access | B (IND) | Eighth Avenue Line | E | September 10, 1932 |
| WTC Cortlandt | Disabled access | A (IRT) | Broadway–Seventh Avenue Line | 1 | July 1, 1918 |

== See also ==
- New York City Subway stations
- List of New York City Subway stations
- List of New York City Subway transfer stations
- List of New York City Subway terminals
- List of closed New York City Subway stations
- List of Staten Island Railway stations
- Accessibility of the Metropolitan Transportation Authority
- List of New York City Subway stations in the Bronx
- List of New York City Subway stations in Brooklyn
- List of New York City Subway stations in Queens
