= List of New York City Subway stations in the Bronx =

The current New York City Transit Authority rail system map; the Bronx is located on the top portion of the map.

The New York City Subway is a rapid transit system that serves four of the five boroughs of New York City in the U.S. state of New York: the Bronx, Brooklyn, Manhattan, and Queens. Operated by the New York City Transit Authority under the Metropolitan Transportation Authority of New York, the New York City Subway is the busiest rapid transit system in the United States and among the 20 busiest in the world. The system's 472 stations qualifies it to have the largest number of rapid transit stations in the world.

Three rapid transit companies merged in 1940 to create the present New York City Subway system: the Interborough Rapid Transit Company (IRT), the Brooklyn–Manhattan Transit Corporation (BMT), and the Independent Subway System (IND). In the Bronx, only the IRT and IND constructed lines in the borough.

== History ==
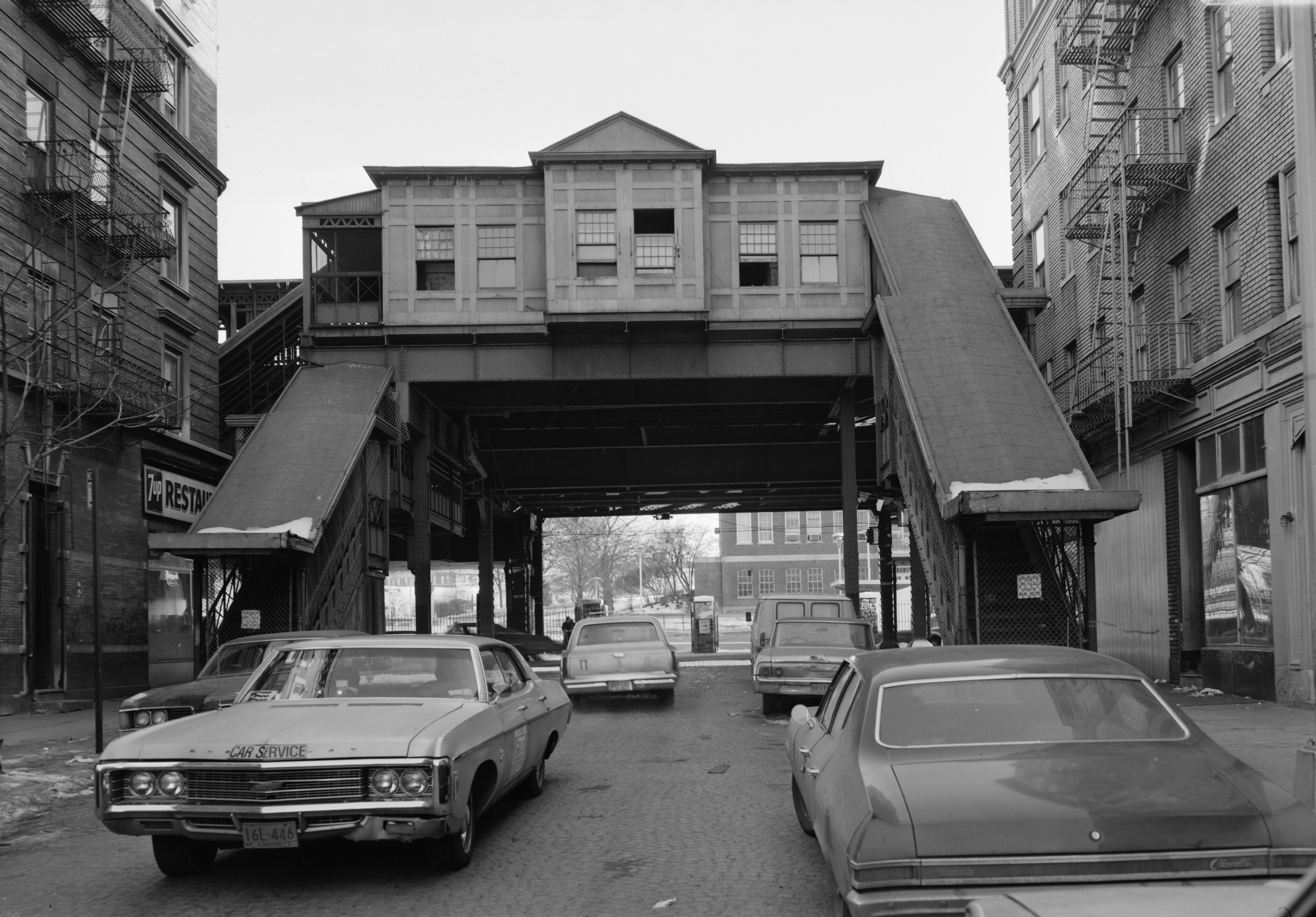
The 183rd Street station of the Third Avenue El, shortly before its demolition.

On May 17, 1886, the Suburban Rapid Transit Company operated the first rapid transit operation in the Annexed District—as the Bronx was known then—via a crossing over the Harlem River between 133rd Street and 129th Street in Manhattan. The Suburban was bought by the Manhattan Railway Company in 1891, which had operated the Second Avenue and Third Avenue Lines from its 129th Street terminal. In turn, the Manhattan Railway was acquired by the IRT in 1902 through a 999-year lease. This line was then known as the IRT Third Avenue Line in both the Bronx and Manhattan. The line was incrementally built northward since its opening until 1920, when it reached its northernmost terminal at Gun Hill Road and connected with the northern portion of the IRT White Plains Road Line. On May 12, 1955, the Third Avenue Line was closed south of 149th Street in response to developers wishing to construct newer residences and commercial buildings on the East Side of Manhattan. The remainder of the Third Avenue Line, wholly within the Bronx, was closed on April 28, 1973 and was subsequently demolished.

In the Bronx, the earliest stations and infrastructure of the New York City Subway still in existence lie in the IRT White Plains Road Line. The line, under a contract with the City of New York called Contract 1, was constructed to connect to the original IRT subway system which had operated since October 27, 1904. The section of the White Plains Road Line that opened a month later operated between 149th Street and 180th Street–Bronx Park (a spur line station closed in 1952, now demolished) and ran through the IRT Third Avenue Line. The underground subway from Manhattan (via the IRT Lenox Avenue Line) reached the Bronx by July 10, 1905 and White Plains Road Line trains operated through the subway. In 1908, as an extension of Contract 1, the IRT Broadway–Seventh Avenue Line, would reach the western Bronx from 225th Street to its present terminal at Van Cortlandt Park–242nd Street, signifying the completion of the first subway. The IRT's next contract, Contract 3, would be granted alongside the BMT's, Contract 4, in what is called the Dual Contracts. Under the Dual Contracts, from 1917 to 1920, the White Plains Road Line was extended from what is now West Farms Square–East Tremont Avenue to 219th Street, 238th Street, and Wakefield–241st Street, its northernmost terminal. Also under the contract, the IRT Jerome Avenue Line was opened in 1917 between 149th Street–Grand Concourse and Kingsbridge Road before its extension northward to Woodlawn and the completion of the IRT Lexington Avenue Line a year later. The IRT Ninth Avenue Line's 155th Street station also connected to the Jerome Avenue Line at 167th Street in 1918. (This section was closed in 1958 and later demolished.) Between 1918 and 1920, the IRT Pelham Line was the last Contract 3 line to be built, from its original section between 125th Street (in Manhattan) and Third Avenue–138th Street, to extensions to Hunts Point Avenue, East 177th Street, Westchester Square, and its northeastern terminus at Pelham Bay Park.

The IND's first and only line in the Bronx, the IND Concourse Line, opened in 1933 from 145th Street in Manhattan to Norwood–205th Street, its northernmost terminal. The most recent expansion of Bronx service happened shortly after the unification of the three New York City subway systems: in 1941, the former tracks of the New York, Westchester and Boston Railway between East 180th Street and Dyre Avenue were acquired by the Board of Transportation to be part of the IRT Division as the IRT Dyre Avenue Line. Through service to Manhattan via the White Plains Road Line at East 180th Street began in 1957.

== Directional prefixes ==
Although many east–west streets in the Bronx are prefixed with either "East" or "West", most subway stations are named without the prefix, e.g. 231st Street instead of West 231st Street. Some stations, such as East 143rd Street and East 149th Street on the Pelham Line and East 180th Street on the White Plains Road Line, have directional prefixes to differentiate from other stations in the same borough: namely the 143rd Street station of the Third Avenue Line; the 149th Street–Grand Concourse and Third Avenue–149th Street stations; and the 180th Street/Third Avenue and 180th Street–Bronx Park stations. The "East" prefix is retained for Tremont Avenue in the West Farms Square–East Tremont Avenue and Westchester Square–East Tremont Avenue stations, while the Concourse Line Tremont Avenue station omits the prefix. In addition, while the Parkchester–East 177th Street station on the Pelham Line used a directional prefix for 177th Street, the now-demolished Tremont Avenue–177th Street station on the Third Avenue Line and the now-renamed 177th Street station on the White Plains Road Line did not use the prefix.

== Lines and services ==
There are 70 New York City Subway stations in the Bronx, per the official count of the Metropolitan Transportation Authority; of these, 9 are express-local stations. If the 2 station complexes are counted as one station each, the number of stations is 68. In the table below, lines with colors next to them indicate trunk lines, which determine the colors that are used for services' route bullets and diamonds. The opening date refers to the opening of the first section of track for the line. In the "division" column, the current division is followed by the original division in parentheses.

Division	Line	Services	Stations in the Bronx	Opened	Continues to
A (IRT)	Broadway–Seventh Avenue Line	"1" train	3	August 1, 1908	Manhattan
B (IND)	Concourse Line	"B" train "D" train	10 (4 express-local stations, 1 part of a station complex)	July 1, 1933	Manhattan
A (IRT)	Dyre Avenue Line	"5" train	5	May 15, 1941	—N/a
A (IRT)	Jerome Avenue Line	"4" train "5" train	14 (2 part of station complexes)	June 2, 1917	Manhattan
A (IRT)	Pelham Line	"6" train "6" express train	18 (3 express-local stations)	August 1, 1918	Manhattan
A (IRT)	White Plains Road Line	"2" train "5" train	20 (3 express-local stations, 1 part of a station complex)	November 26, 1904	Manhattan

== Stations ==
Permanently closed subway stations, including those that have been demolished, are not included in the list below. Numerically named stations that are attached with a geographic location before them (Norwood–205th Street, Wakefield–241st Street, and Van Cortlandt Park–242nd Street) are listed under the geographic location name. (Note: Although the Broadway–Seventh Avenue Line Marble Hill–225th Street station is on the U.S. mainland contiguous with the Bronx, it and the Marble Hill neighborhood are legally part of New York County (Manhattan).)

Station service legend
Stops all times	Stops 24 hours a day
Stops all times except late nights	Stops every day during daytime hours only
Stops late nights only	Stops every day during overnight hours only
Stops weekdays during the day	Stops during weekday daytime hours only
Stops all times except rush hours in the peak direction	Stops 24 hours a day, except during weekday rush hours in the peak direction
Stops daily except rush hours in the peak direction	Stops every day during daytime hours, except during weekday rush hours in the peak direction
Stops rush hours only	Stops during weekday rush hours only
Stops rush hours in the peak direction only	Stops during weekday rush hours in the peak direction only
Time period details
Disabled access	Station is compliant with the Americans with Disabilities Act
↑	Station is compliant with the Americans with Disabilities Act in the indicated direction only
↓	Station is compliant with the Americans with Disabilities Act in the indicated direction only
	Elevator access to mezzanine only

*	Station is part of a station complex
**	Transfer stations either between local and express services or that involve the terminus of a service on the same line; may also be part of a station complex as defined above
***	Multi-level or adjacent-platform transfer stations on different lines considered to be one station as classified by the MTA
†	Terminal of a service
*†, **† or ***†	Transfer stations and terminals
‡	Last station in the Bronx before service continues to Manhattan
*‡, **‡, or ***‡	Last station in the Bronx and a transfer station

Station	Disabled access	Division	Line	Services	Opened
Third Avenue–138th Street**‡		A (IRT)	Pelham Line	6 <6>	August 1, 1918
Third Avenue–149th Street**	Disabled access	A (IRT)	White Plains Road Line	2; 5	July 10, 1905
138th Street–Grand Concourse‡		A (IRT)	Jerome Avenue Line	4; 5	July 17, 1918
149th Street–Hostos* (Note: The 2 platform sets of the 149th Street–Hostos station complex count as one station when compared to international standards.)	Disabled access	A (IRT)	Jerome Avenue Line	4	June 2, 1917
149th Street–Hostos*‡	Disabled access	A (IRT)	White Plains Road Line	2; 5	July 10, 1905
161st Street–Yankee Stadium*‡ (Note: The 2 platform sets of the 161st Street–Yankee Stadium station complex count as one station when compared to international standards.)	Disabled access	B (IND)	Concourse Line	B D	July 1, 1933
161st Street–Yankee Stadium*	Disabled access	A (IRT)	Jerome Avenue Line	4	June 2, 1917
167th Street		B (IND)	Concourse Line	B D	July 1, 1933
167th Street		A (IRT)	Jerome Avenue Line	4	June 2, 1917
170th Street		B (IND)	Concourse Line	B D	July 1, 1933
170th Street	Disabled access	A (IRT)	Jerome Avenue Line	4	June 2, 1917
174th Street		A (IRT)	White Plains Road Line	2; 5	November 26, 1904
174th–175th Streets		B (IND)	Concourse Line	B D	July 1, 1933
176th Street		A (IRT)	Jerome Avenue Line	4	June 2, 1917
182nd–183rd Streets		B (IND)	Concourse Line	B D	July 1, 1933
183rd Street		A (IRT)	Jerome Avenue Line	4	June 2, 1917
219th Street		A (IRT)	White Plains Road Line	2; 5	March 3, 1917
225th Street		A (IRT)	White Plains Road Line	2; 5	March 31, 1917
231st Street‡	Disabled access	A (IRT)	Broadway–Seventh Avenue Line	1	August 1, 1908
233rd Street	Disabled access	A (IRT)	White Plains Road Line	2; 5	March 31, 1917
238th Street		A (IRT)	Broadway–Seventh Avenue Line	1	August 1, 1908
Allerton Avenue		A (IRT)	White Plains Road Line	2; 5	March 3, 1917
Baychester Avenue		A (IRT)	Dyre Avenue Line	5	May 15, 1941
Bedford Park Boulevard**†	Disabled access	B (IND)	Concourse Line	B D	July 1, 1933
Bedford Park Boulevard–Lehman College		A (IRT)	Jerome Avenue Line	4	April 15, 1918
Bronx Park East		A (IRT)	White Plains Road Line	2; 5	March 3, 1917
Brook Avenue		A (IRT)	Pelham Line	6	January 8, 1919
Buhre Avenue		A (IRT)	Pelham Line	6 <6>	December 20, 1920
Burke Avenue		A (IRT)	White Plains Road Line	2; 5	March 3, 1917
Burnside Avenue		A (IRT)	Jerome Avenue Line	4	June 2, 1917
Castle Hill Avenue		A (IRT)	Pelham Line	6	October 24, 1920
Cypress Avenue		A (IRT)	Pelham Line	6	January 8, 1919
East 143rd Street–St. Mary's Street		A (IRT)	Pelham Line	6	January 8, 1919
East 149th Street	Disabled access	A (IRT)	Pelham Line	6	January 8, 1919
East 180th Street**†	Disabled access	A (IRT)	White Plains Road Line	2; 5	March 3, 1917
Eastchester–Dyre Avenue†		A (IRT)	Dyre Avenue Line	5	May 15, 1941
Elder Avenue		A (IRT)	Pelham Line	6	May 30, 1920
Fordham Road**		B (IND)	Concourse Line	B D	July 1, 1933
Fordham Road	Disabled access	A (IRT)	Jerome Avenue Line	4	June 2, 1917
Freeman Street		A (IRT)	White Plains Road Line	2; 5	November 26, 1904
Gun Hill Road	Disabled access	A (IRT)	Dyre Avenue Line	5	May 15, 1941
Gun Hill Road	Disabled access	A (IRT)	White Plains Road Line	2; 5	March 3, 1917
Hunts Point Avenue**	Disabled access	A (IRT)	Pelham Line	6 <6>	January 8, 1919
Intervale Avenue		A (IRT)	White Plains Road Line	2; 5	April 30, 1910
Jackson Avenue		A (IRT)	White Plains Road Line	2; 5	November 26, 1904
Kingsbridge Road**	Disabled access	B (IND)	Concourse Line	B D	July 1, 1933
Kingsbridge Road		A (IRT)	Jerome Avenue Line	4	June 2, 1917
Longwood Avenue		A (IRT)	Pelham Line	6	January 8, 1919
Middletown Road		A (IRT)	Pelham Line	6 <6>	December 20, 1920
Morris Park		A (IRT)	Dyre Avenue Line	5	May 15, 1941
Morrison Avenue–Soundview		A (IRT)	Pelham Line	6	May 30, 1920
Mosholu Parkway	Disabled access	A (IRT)	Jerome Avenue Line	4	April 15, 1918
Mount Eden Avenue		A (IRT)	Jerome Avenue Line	4	June 2, 1917
Nereid Avenue**†		A (IRT)	White Plains Road Line	2; 5	March 31, 1917
Norwood–205th Street†		B (IND)	Concourse Line	D	July 1, 1933
Parkchester**†	Disabled access	A (IRT)	Pelham Line	6 <6>	May 30, 1920
Pelham Bay Park†	Disabled access	A (IRT)	Pelham Line	6 <6>	December 20, 1920
Pelham Parkway		A (IRT)	Dyre Avenue Line	5	May 15, 1941
Pelham Parkway	Disabled access	A (IRT)	White Plains Road Line	2; 5	March 3, 1917
Prospect Avenue		A (IRT)	White Plains Road Line	2; 5	November 26, 1904
Simpson Street	Disabled access	A (IRT)	White Plains Road Line	2; 5	November 26, 1904
St. Lawrence Avenue		A (IRT)	Pelham Line	6	May 30, 1920
Tremont Avenue**‡	Disabled access	B (IND)	Concourse Line	B D	July 1, 1933
Van Cortlandt Park–242nd Street†		A (IRT)	Broadway–Seventh Avenue Line	1	August 1, 1908
Wakefield–241st Street†		A (IRT)	White Plains Road Line	2	December 13, 1920
West Farms Square–East Tremont Avenue		A (IRT)	White Plains Road Line	2; 5	November 26, 1904
Westchester Square–East Tremont Avenue	Disabled access	A (IRT)	Pelham Line	6 <6>	October 24, 1920
Whitlock Avenue		A (IRT)	Pelham Line	6	May 30, 1920
Woodlawn†		A (IRT)	Jerome Avenue Line	4	April 15, 1918
Zerega Avenue		A (IRT)	Pelham Line	6 <6>	October 24, 1920

== See also ==
- New York City Subway stations
- List of New York City Subway stations
- List of New York City Subway transfer stations
- List of New York City Subway terminals
- List of closed New York City Subway stations
- List of Staten Island Railway stations
- Accessibility of the Metropolitan Transportation Authority
- List of New York City Subway stations in Brooklyn
- List of New York City Subway stations in Manhattan
- List of New York City Subway stations in Queens
