= List of New York City Subway transfer stations =

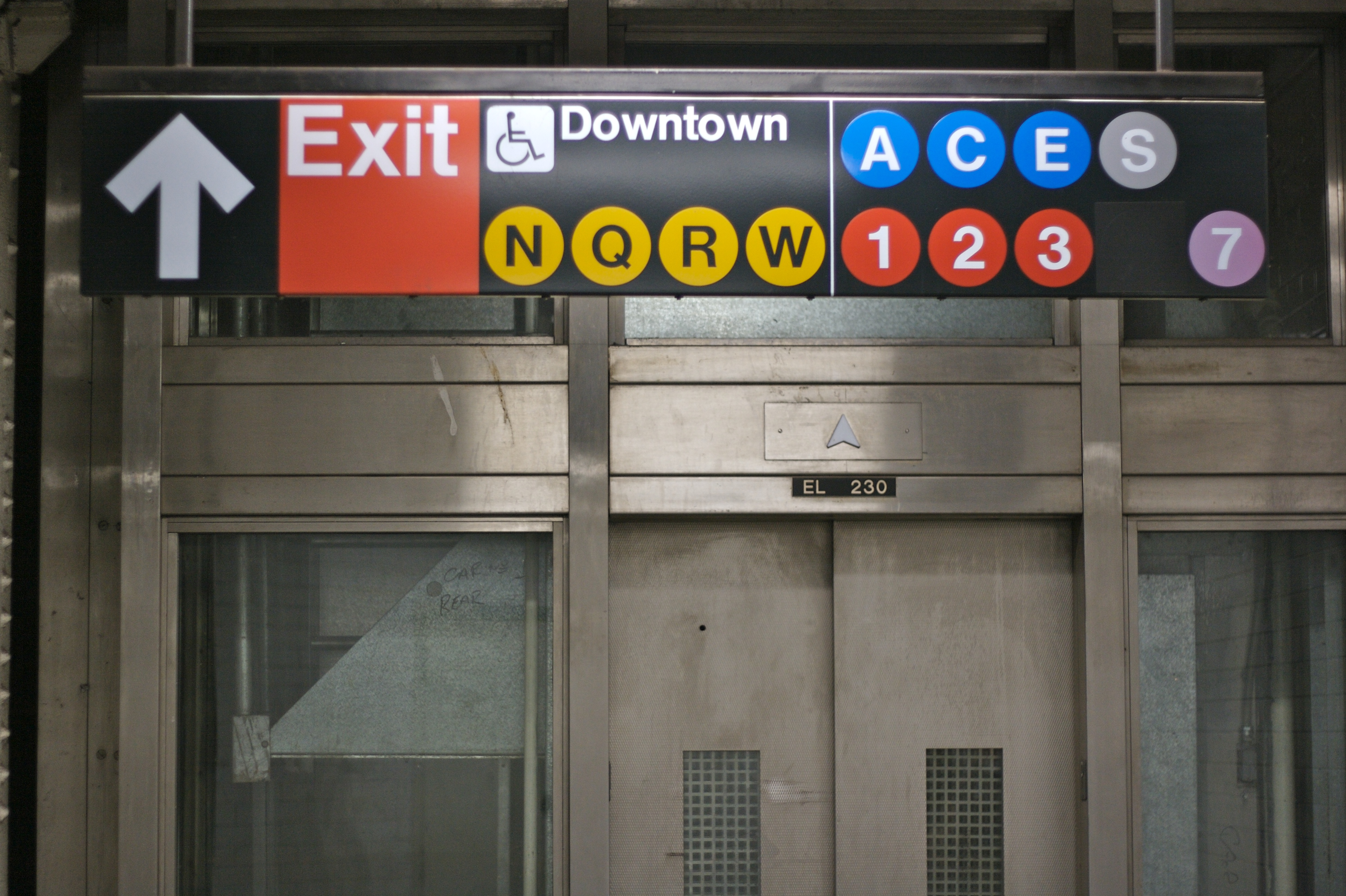
The Times Square–42nd Street and Port Authority Bus Terminal station complex is the busiest station of the New York City Subway and offers connections between twelve services, the most of all the system's transfer stations.

In the New York City Subway there are several types of transfer stations:

1. A station complex is where two or more stations are connected with a passageway inside fare control. There are 472 stations of the New York City Subway when each station is counted separately. When station complexes are counted as one station each, the count of stations is 423.
2. Station serving two or more lines. It may be a multi-level or adjacent-platform station and is considered to be one station as classified by the MTA. Typically each track in a station belongs to a certain line.
3. Station serving two or more services. Different services may share tracks. These stations are not included in this article; see List of New York City Subway stations.

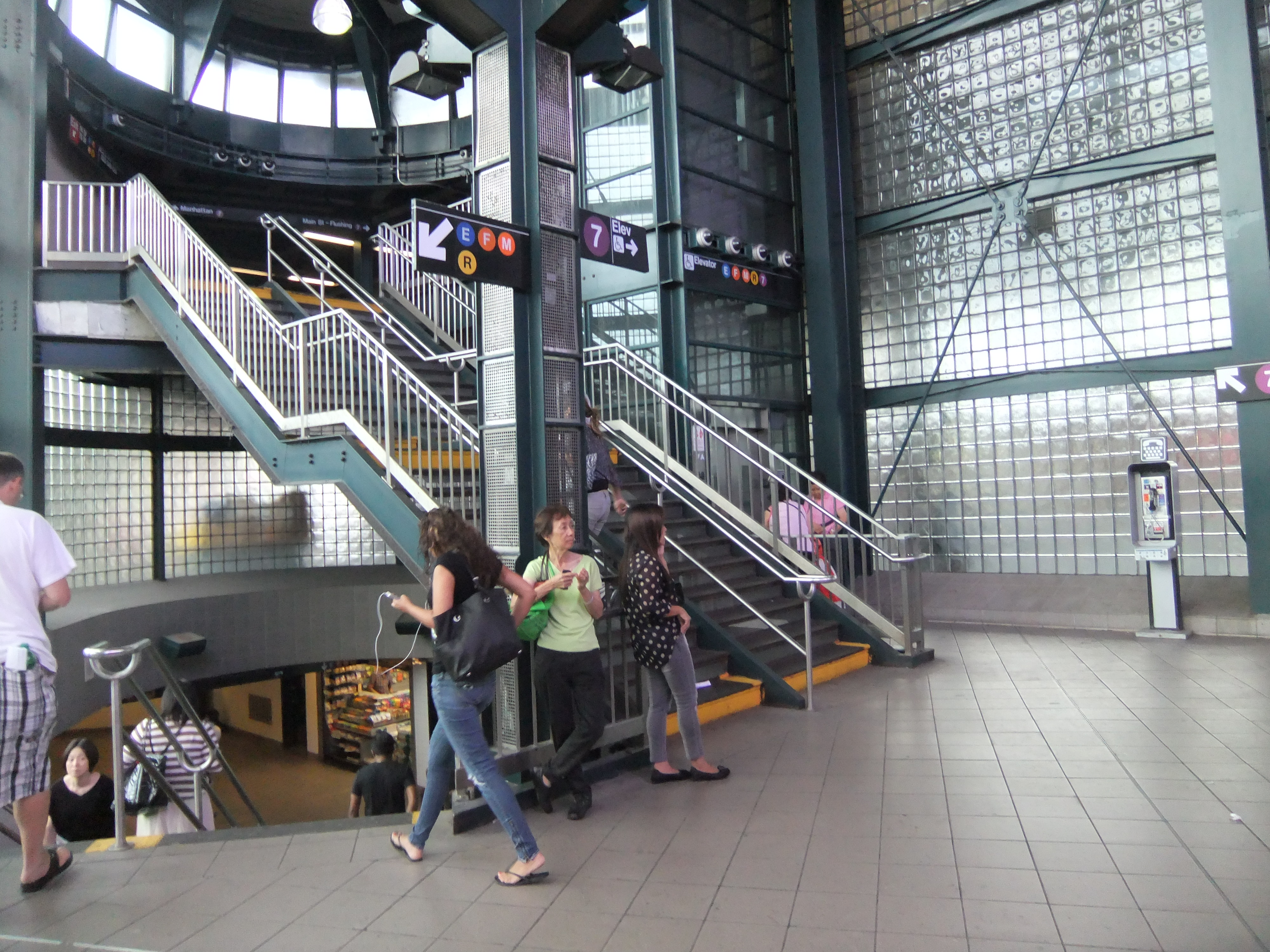
Staircase connecting two stations at Jackson Heights–Roosevelt Avenue/74th Street

Transfers are not limited to enclosed passageways. The New York City Transit Authority (NYCTA), manager of the New York City Subway, also offers limited free transfers between subway lines that allow passengers to reenter the system's fare control. This was originally done through a paper ticketing system before it was replaced by the MetroCard. Now the only permanent MetroCard and OMNY subway-to-subway transfers are between the Lexington Avenue/59th Street complex (4, 5, 6, <6>, N, R, and W trains) and the Lexington Avenue–63rd Street station (F, M, N, Q, and R trains) in Manhattan and between the Junius Street (2, 3, 4, and 5 trains) and Livonia Avenue (L train) stations in Brooklyn. The contactless OMNY fare payment system installed in 2019-2020 supports the same free transfers as the MetroCard does.

Some paper transfers between specific subway stations and bus routes also existed prior to July 4, 1997, when the MetroCard allowed free system-wide subway–bus transfers with fewer restrictions. The Rockaway Parkway station on the BMT Canarsie Line (L train) offers a transfer to the B42 bus within the station's fare control, the only such transfer within the NYCTA. This transfer was removed in 2025 due to heavy fare evasion.

== Context ==
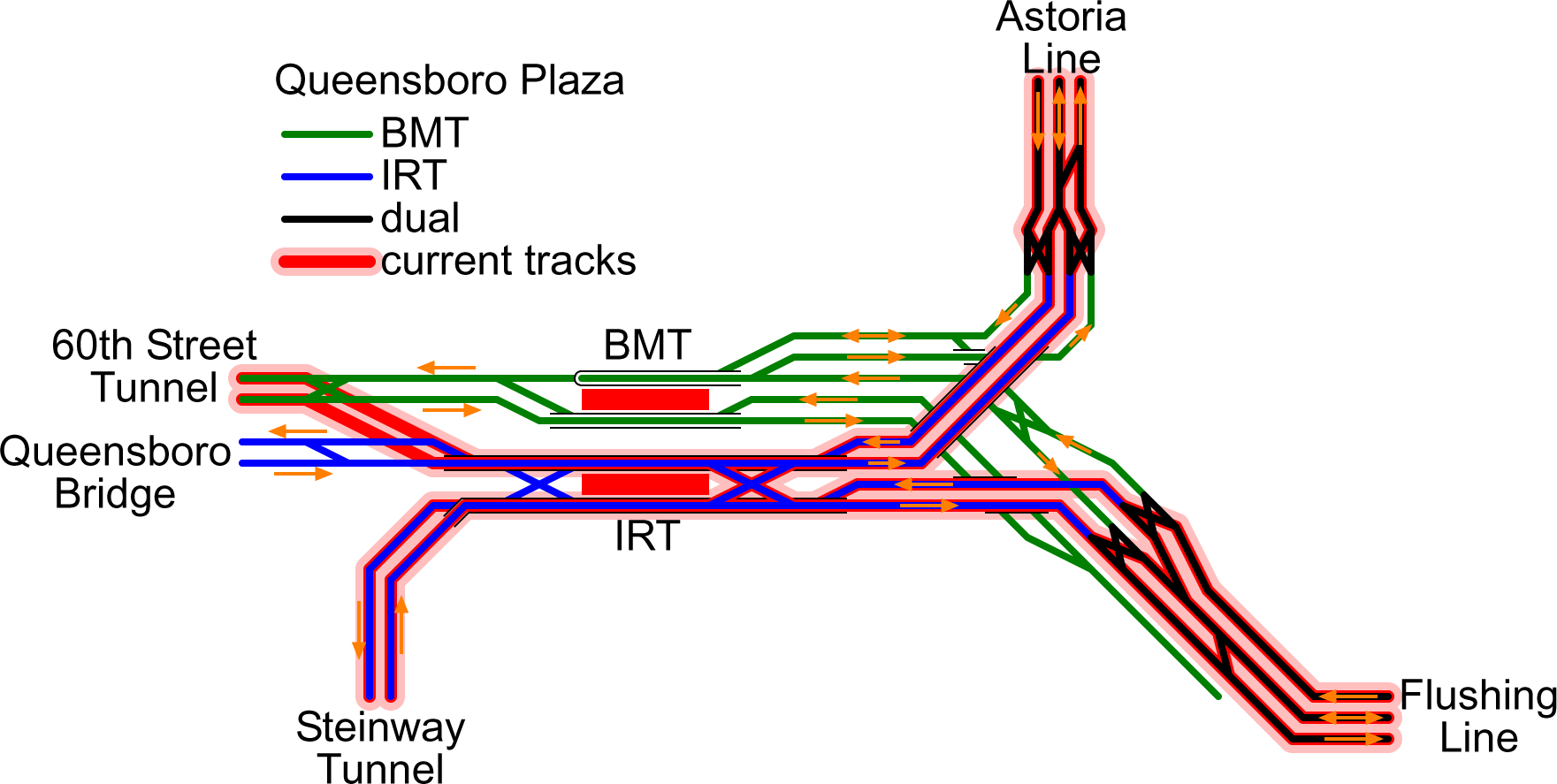
The former and current track configurations at the Queensboro Plaza cross-platform transfer station

The system was created from the consolidation of three separate companies that merged in 1940: the Interborough Rapid Transit Company (IRT), the Brooklyn–Manhattan Transit Corporation (BMT), and the Independent Subway System (IND). The earliest transfer stations were between lines of the same system: either the IRT, BMT or IND. The earliest free connection between lines that remains in existence is at Grand Central–42nd Street between the IRT Flushing Line and the original IRT subway (now served by the IRT 42nd Street Shuttle), which opened on June 22, 1915. Some stations were constructed with passageways that connected different systems, such as the original IRT subway's (now IRT Lexington Avenue Line) Brooklyn Bridge station with the BMT Centre Street Loop Subway's (now BMT Nassau Street Line) Chambers Street station. On July 1, 1948, post-unification, many free transfers between the former systems were created coincident with the doubling of the fare from five to ten cents.

The most recently created station complex is the Jay Street–MetroTech complex in Brooklyn on the IND Culver Line, IND Fulton Street Line and BMT Fourth Avenue Line; opened on December 8, 2010. The Court Square complex in Queens, which opened in 1988 as a connection between the IND Queens Boulevard and IND Crosstown lines, was expanded by adding a passageway to the IRT Flushing Line on June 3, 2011. A free transfer from Broadway–Lafayette Street to the uptown platform of Bleecker Street opened on September 25, 2012. A transfer to the downtown platform has existed since May 19, 1957. A passageway between Cortlandt Street and World Trade Center opened on December 29, 2017, along with a connection to the World Trade Center Transportation Hub. A passageway between the Times Square–42nd Street and Port Authority Bus Terminal station complex, and the Bryant Park station complex, was built in 2021, along with a new platform at the shuttle station (both the platform and passageway are closed during late nights).

== Manhattan ==
=== Lower Manhattan (14th Street and below) ===
Station complex	Individual stations	Lines	Services	Notes
14th Street/Sixth Avenue	14th Street	IRT Broadway–Seventh Avenue Line	1; 2; 3	The IND Sixth Avenue Line and BMT Canarsie Line were connected inside fare control in the late 1960s, and a passageway west to the IRT Broadway–Seventh Avenue Line opened on January 16, 1978.
14th Street/Sixth Avenue	14th Street	IND Sixth Avenue Line	F <F> M	The IND Sixth Avenue Line and BMT Canarsie Line were connected inside fare control in the late 1960s, and a passageway west to the IRT Broadway–Seventh Avenue Line opened on January 16, 1978.
14th Street/Sixth Avenue	Sixth Avenue	BMT Canarsie Line	L	The IND Sixth Avenue Line and BMT Canarsie Line were connected inside fare control in the late 1960s, and a passageway west to the IRT Broadway–Seventh Avenue Line opened on January 16, 1978.
14th Street/Eighth Avenue	14th Street	IND Eighth Avenue Line	A C E	The transfer passageway between the IND Eighth Avenue Line and BMT Canarsie Line was placed inside fare control on July 1, 1948.
14th Street/Eighth Avenue	Eighth Avenue	BMT Canarsie Line	L	The transfer passageway between the IND Eighth Avenue Line and BMT Canarsie Line was placed inside fare control on July 1, 1948.
14th Street–Union Square	14th Street–Union Square	BMT Broadway Line	N Q R W	The BMT Broadway Line, BMT Canarsie Line, and IRT Lexington Avenue Line are linked by passageways at Union Square. The two BMT lines were connected on June 30, 1924, when the Canarsie Line opened. A passageway to the IRT was placed inside fare control on July 1, 1948.
14th Street–Union Square	Union Square	BMT Canarsie Line	L	The BMT Broadway Line, BMT Canarsie Line, and IRT Lexington Avenue Line are linked by passageways at Union Square. The two BMT lines were connected on June 30, 1924, when the Canarsie Line opened. A passageway to the IRT was placed inside fare control on July 1, 1948.
14th Street–Union Square	14th Street–Union Square	IRT Lexington Avenue Line	4; 5; 6 <6>	The BMT Broadway Line, BMT Canarsie Line, and IRT Lexington Avenue Line are linked by passageways at Union Square. The two BMT lines were connected on June 30, 1924, when the Canarsie Line opened. A passageway to the IRT was placed inside fare control on July 1, 1948.
Broadway–Lafayette Street/Bleecker Street	Bleecker Street	IRT Lexington Avenue Line	4; 6 <6>	A transfer passageway between the southbound IRT Lexington Avenue Line and both directions of the IND Sixth Avenue Line was placed inside fare control on May 19, 1957. The Bleecker Street uptown platform was remodeled to provide an easier transfer to/from the Broadway-Lafayette Street station and opened on March 26, 2012. The northbound transfer for the Lexington Avenue line opened on September 25, 2012, and the station became ADA-accessible.
Broadway–Lafayette Street/Bleecker Street	Broadway–Lafayette Street	IND Sixth Avenue Line	B D F <F> M	A transfer passageway between the southbound IRT Lexington Avenue Line and both directions of the IND Sixth Avenue Line was placed inside fare control on May 19, 1957. The Bleecker Street uptown platform was remodeled to provide an easier transfer to/from the Broadway-Lafayette Street station and opened on March 26, 2012. The northbound transfer for the Lexington Avenue line opened on September 25, 2012, and the station became ADA-accessible.
Brooklyn Bridge–City Hall/Chambers Street	Brooklyn Bridge–City Hall	IRT Lexington Avenue Line	4; 5; 6 <6>	These two adjacent stations on the IRT Lexington Avenue Line and BMT Nassau Street Line are connected by two passageways. The south one opened in 1914, and was placed inside fare control on July 1, 1948. A second passageway, at the north end of the stations, was opened in the evening of September 1, 1962, when the Lexington Avenue Line platforms were extended and the Worth Street station was closed.
Brooklyn Bridge–City Hall/Chambers Street	Chambers Street	BMT Nassau Street Line	J Z	These two adjacent stations on the IRT Lexington Avenue Line and BMT Nassau Street Line are connected by two passageways. The south one opened in 1914, and was placed inside fare control on July 1, 1948. A second passageway, at the north end of the stations, was opened in the evening of September 1, 1962, when the Lexington Avenue Line platforms were extended and the Worth Street station was closed.
Canal Street	Canal Street (lower level – express)	BMT Broadway Line	N Q	The lower level of the BMT Broadway Line is linked to the upper level of the BMT Broadway Line, the IRT Lexington Avenue Line and the BMT Nassau Street Line via passageways. The three BMT stations were linked on September 4, 1917, when the Broadway Line opened. The IRT was connected on January 16, 1978.
Canal Street	Canal Street (upper level – local)	BMT Broadway Line	N R W	The lower level of the BMT Broadway Line is linked to the upper level of the BMT Broadway Line, the IRT Lexington Avenue Line and the BMT Nassau Street Line via passageways. The three BMT stations were linked on September 4, 1917, when the Broadway Line opened. The IRT was connected on January 16, 1978.
Canal Street	Canal Street	IRT Lexington Avenue Line	4; 6 <6>	The lower level of the BMT Broadway Line is linked to the upper level of the BMT Broadway Line, the IRT Lexington Avenue Line and the BMT Nassau Street Line via passageways. The three BMT stations were linked on September 4, 1917, when the Broadway Line opened. The IRT was connected on January 16, 1978.
Canal Street	Canal Street	BMT Nassau Street Line	J Z	The lower level of the BMT Broadway Line is linked to the upper level of the BMT Broadway Line, the IRT Lexington Avenue Line and the BMT Nassau Street Line via passageways. The three BMT stations were linked on September 4, 1917, when the Broadway Line opened. The IRT was connected on January 16, 1978.
Chambers Street–World Trade Center/Park Place/Cortlandt Street	Chambers Street	IND Eighth Avenue Line	A C	The two halves of the IND Eighth Avenue Line and the IRT Broadway–Seventh Avenue Line are connected by the IND Eighth Avenue Line's express platform. The connections were opened in the 1950s, before which none of the three parts, not even the two IND stations, were connected. The BMT Broadway Line was connected to the Eighth Avenue Line's local platform in 2017 via a passageway.
Chambers Street–World Trade Center/Park Place/Cortlandt Street	World Trade Center	IND Eighth Avenue Line	E	The two halves of the IND Eighth Avenue Line and the IRT Broadway–Seventh Avenue Line are connected by the IND Eighth Avenue Line's express platform. The connections were opened in the 1950s, before which none of the three parts, not even the two IND stations, were connected. The BMT Broadway Line was connected to the Eighth Avenue Line's local platform in 2017 via a passageway.
Chambers Street–World Trade Center/Park Place/Cortlandt Street	Cortlandt Street	BMT Broadway Line	N R W	The two halves of the IND Eighth Avenue Line and the IRT Broadway–Seventh Avenue Line are connected by the IND Eighth Avenue Line's express platform. The connections were opened in the 1950s, before which none of the three parts, not even the two IND stations, were connected. The BMT Broadway Line was connected to the Eighth Avenue Line's local platform in 2017 via a passageway.
Chambers Street–World Trade Center/Park Place/Cortlandt Street	Park Place	IRT Broadway–Seventh Avenue Line	2; 3	The two halves of the IND Eighth Avenue Line and the IRT Broadway–Seventh Avenue Line are connected by the IND Eighth Avenue Line's express platform. The connections were opened in the 1950s, before which none of the three parts, not even the two IND stations, were connected. The BMT Broadway Line was connected to the Eighth Avenue Line's local platform in 2017 via a passageway.
Delancey Street/Essex Street	Delancey Street	IND Sixth Avenue Line	F <F>	A passageway between the IND Sixth Avenue Line and BMT Nassau Street Line was placed inside fare control on July 1, 1948.
Delancey Street/Essex Street	Essex Street	BMT Nassau Street Line	J M Z	A passageway between the IND Sixth Avenue Line and BMT Nassau Street Line was placed inside fare control on July 1, 1948.
Fulton Street/Fulton Center	Fulton Street	IND Eighth Avenue Line	A C	A complicated network of passageways connects four separate stations on the IND Eighth Avenue Line, IRT Lexington Avenue Line, BMT Nassau Street Line, and IRT Broadway–Seventh Avenue Line. The full transfer system here was formed on July 1, 1948. While the passageways between the Eighth Avenue, Nassau Street, and Broadway–Seventh Avenue platforms all existed at the time, and were simply placed inside fare control, a paper transfer to the Lexington Avenue Line was issued at first, until a new passageway was opened on August 25, 1950. In December 2010, the Eighth Avenue Line station's name was changed from Broadway–Nassau Street to Fulton Street.
Fulton Street/Fulton Center	Fulton Street	IRT Broadway–Seventh Avenue Line	2; 3	
Fulton Street/Fulton Center	Fulton Street	IRT Lexington Avenue Line	4; 5	
Fulton Street/Fulton Center	Fulton Street	BMT Nassau Street Line	J Z	
Oculus	Cortlandt Street	BMT Broadway Line	N R W	In November 2014, the Fulton Center opened, connecting the stations to Cortlandt Street outside of fare control, through the Dey Street Passageway. The BMT Broadway Line and IND Eighth Avenue Line stations at Cortlandt Street and World Trade Center were connected in 2017 via a passageway.
Oculus	World Trade Center	IND Eighth Avenue Line	E	In November 2014, the Fulton Center opened, connecting the stations to Cortlandt Street outside of fare control, through the Dey Street Passageway. The BMT Broadway Line and IND Eighth Avenue Line stations at Cortlandt Street and World Trade Center were connected in 2017 via a passageway.
Oculus	WTC Cortlandt	IRT Broadway–Seventh Avenue Line	1	On September 8, 2018, the WTC Cortlandt station reopened, connecting the station to Cortlandt Street (BMT), World Trade Center (IND), and Fulton Center outside of fare control via the Dey Street Passageway and World Trade Center Transportation Hub.
South Ferry/Whitehall Street	South Ferry	IRT Broadway–Seventh Avenue Line	1	A new passageway opened concurrently with the opening of the new South Ferry station on March 16, 2009. This connects the IRT Broadway–Seventh Avenue Line with the Whitehall Street station on the BMT Broadway Line.
South Ferry/Whitehall Street	Whitehall Street–South Ferry	BMT Broadway Line	N R W	A new passageway opened concurrently with the opening of the new South Ferry station on March 16, 2009. This connects the IRT Broadway–Seventh Avenue Line with the Whitehall Street station on the BMT Broadway Line.
West Fourth Street–Washington Square	lower level	IND Sixth Avenue Line	B D F <F> M	The station became a transfer station when the Sixth Avenue Line opened in 1940.
West Fourth Street–Washington Square	upper level	IND Eighth Avenue Line	A C E	The station became a transfer station when the Sixth Avenue Line opened in 1940.

==== Former transfers ====
When the elevated IRT Third Avenue Line closed from Chatham Square to South Ferry on December 22, 1950, a paper transfer was given to the M15 bus route. The Third Avenue Line was closed in Manhattan on May 12, 1955, removing this transfer.

When the new "H" system was implemented on August 1, 1918, the Public Service Commission was unprepared for the heavy traffic using the 42nd Street Shuttle. The shuttle was closed for rebuilding at the end of August 3, and a paper transfer was added between Rector Street on the IRT Broadway–Seventh Avenue Line and Wall Street on the IRT Lexington Avenue Line (the only one of the two lines to go to Brooklyn at that time). Shuttle service resumed on September 28, 1918, but the transfer remained, and was expanded to allow transfers from Wall Street on the Brooklyn Branch of the Broadway–Seventh Avenue Line, its temporary end. After the Brooklyn Branch was completed on April 15, 1919, the transfer was no longer needed.

There was never a free transfer between the IRT Broadway–Seventh Avenue Line (outer) and IRT Lexington Avenue Line (inner) platforms at South Ferry. However, by 1960, night and weekend Lexington Avenue Line service (5 and 6 trains) stopped at the outer platform. This unadvertised transfer existed until 1977, when Lexington Avenue Line trains stopped running to South Ferry.

=== Midtown and Upper Manhattan ===
Station complex	Individual stations	Lines	Services	Notes
34th Street–Herald Square	34th Street–Herald Square	BMT Broadway Line	N Q R W	The BMT Broadway Line and IND Sixth Avenue Line, which lie on top of each other, received a transfer at the time of the July 1, 1948 fare increase. An existing connection was placed inside fare control.
34th Street–Herald Square	34th Street–Herald Square	IND Sixth Avenue Line	B D F <F> M	The BMT Broadway Line and IND Sixth Avenue Line, which lie on top of each other, received a transfer at the time of the July 1, 1948 fare increase. An existing connection was placed inside fare control.
Grand Central–42nd Street	Grand Central	IRT 42nd Street Shuttle	S	The subway station at Grand Central Terminal serves the IRT Lexington Avenue Line, IRT Flushing Line, and IRT 42nd Street Shuttle. Connections are closely integrated, since all three lines were operated by the Interborough Rapid Transit Company. The original station, opened on October 27, 1904, served only the first IRT subway, and is now the shuttle platform. The Flushing Line station opened on June 22, 1915, and the Lexington Avenue Line station on July 17, 1918, each with direct connections to the existing station. The elevated IRT Second Avenue Line was closed on June 13, 1942, and, starting the next day, a paper transfer was available between the elevated IRT Third Avenue Line and the Grand Central complex. This allowed passengers who had taken the Second Avenue Line over the Queensboro Bridge to instead use the Third Avenue Line to Lower Manhattan. The Third Avenue Line closed on May 12, 1955, ending this transfer.
Grand Central–42nd Street	Grand Central	IRT Flushing Line	7 <7>	
Grand Central–42nd Street	Grand Central–42nd Street	IRT Lexington Avenue Line	4; 5; 6 <6>	
Grand Central–42nd Street	42nd Street	IRT Third Avenue Line	N/A	
Times Square–42nd Street/Port Authority Bus Terminal	Times Square	IRT 42nd Street Shuttle	S	At Times Square, a number of passageways connect the IRT Broadway–Seventh Avenue Line, IRT Flushing Line, IRT 42nd Street Shuttle, and BMT Broadway Line. A block-long passageway west to the IND Eighth Avenue Line is also inside fare control. The first transfer here was between the original IRT subway (now the shuttle platform) and the Broadway–Seventh Avenue Line, opened on June 3, 1917, when the latter line opened as a shuttle to 34th Street–Penn Station. The Flushing Line was extended to Times Square on March 14, 1927, and a passageway connecting the IRT and BMT was placed inside fare control on July 1, 1948. The same was done with the connection to the Eighth Avenue Line in December 1988. A passageway to the 42nd Street–Bryant Park station opened on September 7, 2021, along with a new platform at the shuttle station. The new passageway is closed during late nights, when the shuttle doesn't operate.
Times Square–42nd Street/Port Authority Bus Terminal	Times Square–42nd Street	BMT Broadway Line	N Q R W	
Times Square–42nd Street/Port Authority Bus Terminal	Times Square–42nd Street	IRT Broadway–Seventh Avenue Line	1; 2; 3	
Times Square–42nd Street/Port Authority Bus Terminal	Times Square	IRT Flushing Line	7 <7>	
Times Square–42nd Street/Port Authority Bus Terminal	42nd Street–Port Authority Bus Terminal	IND Eighth Avenue Line	A C E	
42nd Street–Bryant Park/Fifth Avenue	42nd Street–Bryant Park	IND Sixth Avenue Line	B D F <F> M	A paper transfer was added between the IND Sixth Avenue Line and IRT Flushing Line at Bryant Park on July 1, 1968, when KK service started and the new 57th Street station opened. The transfer was only valid on weekdays from 5:00 a.m. to 8:00 p.m. until a passageway was opened by 1971.
42nd Street–Bryant Park/Fifth Avenue	Fifth Avenue	IRT Flushing Line	7 <7>	A paper transfer was added between the IND Sixth Avenue Line and IRT Flushing Line at Bryant Park on July 1, 1968, when KK service started and the new 57th Street station opened. The transfer was only valid on weekdays from 5:00 a.m. to 8:00 p.m. until a passageway was opened by 1971.
50th Street	upper level	IND Eighth Avenue Line	A C	The station became a transfer station when the Queens Boulevard Line opened in 1933. There is no free connection between trains in opposite directions. A free transfer only exists between the northbound (uptown) services and another exists between the southbound (downtown) services.
50th Street	lower level	IND Queens Boulevard Line	E	The station became a transfer station when the Queens Boulevard Line opened in 1933. There is no free connection between trains in opposite directions. A free transfer only exists between the northbound (uptown) services and another exists between the southbound (downtown) services.
Lexington Avenue/51st Street	51st Street	IRT Lexington Avenue Line	4; 6 <6>	A passageway connects these two stations on the IRT Lexington Avenue Line and IND Queens Boulevard Line. The $13 million tunnel was paid for by Boston Properties, who was building an office tower on the southeast corner of Lexington Avenue and 53rd Street, in exchange for a zoning bonus of 20% more space, and opened in early November 1986.
Lexington Avenue/51st Street	Lexington Avenue–53rd Street	IND Queens Boulevard Line	E F <F>	A passageway connects these two stations on the IRT Lexington Avenue Line and IND Queens Boulevard Line. The $13 million tunnel was paid for by Boston Properties, who was building an office tower on the southeast corner of Lexington Avenue and 53rd Street, in exchange for a zoning bonus of 20% more space, and opened in early November 1986.
Seventh Avenue	cross-platform interchange on two levels	IND Sixth Avenue Line	B D	The station became a transfer station when the Sixth Avenue Line opened in 1940.
Seventh Avenue	cross-platform interchange on two levels	IND Queens Boulevard Line	E	The station became a transfer station when the Sixth Avenue Line opened in 1940.
59th Street–Columbus Circle	59th Street–Columbus Circle	IRT Broadway–Seventh Avenue Line	1; 2	The IRT Broadway–Seventh Avenue Line and IND Eighth Avenue Line stations at Columbus Circle, which lie above each other, are connected by a passageway that was placed inside fare control on July 1, 1948.
59th Street–Columbus Circle	59th Street–Columbus Circle	IND Eighth Avenue Line	A B C D	The IRT Broadway–Seventh Avenue Line and IND Eighth Avenue Line stations at Columbus Circle, which lie above each other, are connected by a passageway that was placed inside fare control on July 1, 1948.
Lexington Avenue/59th–63rd Streets	59th Street	IRT Lexington Avenue Line	4; 5; 6 <6>	The passageways between the Broadway Line and the upper-level local Lexington Avenue Line stations were placed inside fare control on July 1, 1948. When the lower-level express Lexington Avenue platforms opened in 1962 to relieve congestion at the Grand Central–42nd Street transfer point, those platforms were connected to the local platforms and Broadway Line platforms above. A MetroCard out-of-system transfer to the IND 63rd Street Line was added on December 16, 2001, when the Queens section of that line was completed. Since the F had moved to the new line, there was no longer a direct transfer to the Lexington Avenue Line, and so this transfer was added with an above-ground walk, free for MetroCard users within two hours of the original boarding. The cross-platform transfer between both the IND and BMT 63rd Street lines opened on January 1, 2017 with the opening of the Second Avenue Subway. Lexington Avenue-63rd Street was originally a two level station with the BMT tracks hidden behind a now demolished wall with orange tiles.
Lexington Avenue/59th–63rd Streets	Lexington Avenue–59th Street	BMT Broadway Line	N R W	
Lexington Avenue/59th–63rd Streets	Lexington Avenue–63rd Street (cross-platform interchange on two levels)	IND 63rd Street Line	F M	
Lexington Avenue/59th–63rd Streets	Lexington Avenue–63rd Street (cross-platform interchange on two levels)	BMT 63rd Street Line	N Q R	
145th Street	upper level	IND Eighth Avenue Line	A C	The station became a transfer station when the Concourse Line opened in 1933.
145th Street	lower level	IND Concourse Line	B D	The station became a transfer station when the Concourse Line opened in 1933.
168th Street (New York City Subway)	168th Street	IRT Broadway–Seventh Avenue Line	1	At the crossing of the IRT Broadway–Seventh Avenue Line and IND Eighth Avenue Line in Washington Heights, a passageway connects the two stations. It was placed inside fare control on July 1, 1948.
168th Street (New York City Subway)	168th Street	IND Eighth Avenue Line	A C	At the crossing of the IRT Broadway–Seventh Avenue Line and IND Eighth Avenue Line in Washington Heights, a passageway connects the two stations. It was placed inside fare control on July 1, 1948.

==== Former transfers ====
A paper transfer at the Polo Grounds (155th Street), between the IND Concourse Line and Polo Grounds Shuttle, was created on June 12, 1940, immediately after the IRT Ninth Avenue Line was closed south of 155th Street. It, along with the new transfer at 161st Street–Yankee Stadium, allowed passengers who had taken the Ninth Avenue Line from the IRT Jerome Avenue Line in the Bronx to use the IND Concourse Line and IND Eighth Avenue Line. The Polo Grounds Shuttle and the transfer were discontinued on August 31, 1958.

== The Bronx ==
Station complex	Individual stations	Lines	Services	Notes
149th Street–Hostos	149th Street–Hostos	IRT Jerome Avenue Line	4	The station became a transfer station when the Jerome Avenue Line opened in 1917. The upper-level Jerome Avenue platforms and the lower-level White Plains Road platforms are perpendicular to each other.
149th Street–Hostos	149th Street–Hostos	IRT White Plains Road Line	2; 5	The station became a transfer station when the Jerome Avenue Line opened in 1917. The upper-level Jerome Avenue platforms and the lower-level White Plains Road platforms are perpendicular to each other.
161st Street–Yankee Stadium	161st Street–Yankee Stadium	IND Concourse Line	B D	A passageway connects the elevated IRT Jerome Avenue Line and underground IND Concourse Line at Yankee Stadium. The free transfer was added on June 12, 1940 as a paper transfer, replacing the closed IRT Ninth Avenue Line through Manhattan. Passengers that had transferred from the Jerome Avenue Line to the Ninth Avenue Line could now use the Concourse Line and IND Eighth Avenue Line, or alternately use the Polo Grounds Shuttle and another new transfer to the Concourse Line at 155th Street. A passageway was later built inside fare control.
161st Street–Yankee Stadium	161st Street–Yankee Stadium	IRT Jerome Avenue Line	4	

=== Former transfers ===
The first portion of the IRT White Plains Road Line opened on November 26, 1904 as a branch from the elevated IRT Third Avenue Line north of 149th Street to 180th Street–Bronx Park in West Farms. It was connected into the original IRT subway on July 10, 1905, and Third Avenue service was ended. Transfers were given at 149th Street for passengers who wanted to change to Third Avenue, and transfers were added between the Manhattan-bound subway and the Third Avenue Line to the north on July 13 due to the "congestion and confusion" at that point. These transfers originally only applied to trains continuing in the same direction; by the 1920s, this transfer point had become very congested. A passageway inside fare control was opened on June 1, 1927 in the triangle bounded by 148th Street, Third Avenue, and Willis Avenue. The Third Avenue Line closed on April 28, 1973, ending the transfer.

The IRT Dyre Avenue Line opened on May 15, 1941. At first, it did not connect directly to the IRT White Plains Road Line, and a transfer passageway (used by the New York, Westchester and Boston Railway when the Dyre Avenue Line tracks were part of its operation) was placed inside fare control. A direct connection to the White Plains Road Line north of the station opened on May 6, 1957, and the old NYW&B station was closed.

== Brooklyn ==
Station complex	Individual stations	Lines	Services	Notes
Fourth Avenue/Ninth Street	Fourth Avenue	IND Culver Line	F G	A transfer between the BMT Fourth Avenue Line and IND Culver Line was added on May 28, 1959.
Fourth Avenue/Ninth Street	Ninth Street	BMT Fourth Avenue Line	D N R W	A transfer between the BMT Fourth Avenue Line and IND Culver Line was added on May 28, 1959.
Atlantic Avenue–Barclays Center	Atlantic Avenue-Barclays Center	BMT Brighton Line	B Q	Passageways connect the BMT Fourth Avenue Line and BMT Brighton Line, with the IRT Eastern Parkway Line in the middle. The passageway between the Brighton and Eastern Parkway Lines was added on November 26, 1967, when the Chrystie Street Connection opened and most Brighton Line trains were sent to the IND Sixth Avenue Line. The transfer to the Fourth Avenue Line was added on January 16, 1978.
Atlantic Avenue–Barclays Center	Atlantic Avenue–Barclays Center	IRT Eastern Parkway Line	2; 3; 4; 5	Passageways connect the BMT Fourth Avenue Line and BMT Brighton Line, with the IRT Eastern Parkway Line in the middle. The passageway between the Brighton and Eastern Parkway Lines was added on November 26, 1967, when the Chrystie Street Connection opened and most Brighton Line trains were sent to the IND Sixth Avenue Line. The transfer to the Fourth Avenue Line was added on January 16, 1978.
Atlantic Avenue–Barclays Center	Atlantic Avenue-Barclays Center	BMT Fourth Avenue Line	D N R W	Passageways connect the BMT Fourth Avenue Line and BMT Brighton Line, with the IRT Eastern Parkway Line in the middle. The passageway between the Brighton and Eastern Parkway Lines was added on November 26, 1967, when the Chrystie Street Connection opened and most Brighton Line trains were sent to the IND Sixth Avenue Line. The transfer to the Fourth Avenue Line was added on January 16, 1978.
Broadway Junction	Broadway Junction	BMT Canarsie Line	L	The elevated BMT Jamaica Line and BMT Canarsie Line and underground IND Fulton Street Line are connected by passageways inside fare control. This was originally the site of a transfer station between the BMT Fulton Street Line and the other two lines, but the Fulton Street portion was removed as part of the Dual Contracts rebuilding. The passageway connecting to the IND Fulton Street Line was built and placed inside fare control on July 1, 1948.
Broadway Junction	Broadway Junction	IND Fulton Street Line	A C	The elevated BMT Jamaica Line and BMT Canarsie Line and underground IND Fulton Street Line are connected by passageways inside fare control. This was originally the site of a transfer station between the BMT Fulton Street Line and the other two lines, but the Fulton Street portion was removed as part of the Dual Contracts rebuilding. The passageway connecting to the IND Fulton Street Line was built and placed inside fare control on July 1, 1948.
Broadway Junction	Broadway Junction	BMT Jamaica Line	J Z	The elevated BMT Jamaica Line and BMT Canarsie Line and underground IND Fulton Street Line are connected by passageways inside fare control. This was originally the site of a transfer station between the BMT Fulton Street Line and the other two lines, but the Fulton Street portion was removed as part of the Dual Contracts rebuilding. The passageway connecting to the IND Fulton Street Line was built and placed inside fare control on July 1, 1948.
Coney Island–Stillwell Avenue	four island platforms, one for each line, on the same level	BMT Brighton Line	Q	The first connection between lines was between the Sea Beach and the West End lines on December 23, 1918. The Brighton Line platform opened on May 29, 1919 followed by the Culver Line on May 1, 1920. When the Culver Line passed from BMT to IND control in 1954, the transfer became inter-division. The station is a terminal for all four lines and services.
Coney Island–Stillwell Avenue	four island platforms, one for each line, on the same level	IND Culver Line	F <F>	The first connection between lines was between the Sea Beach and the West End lines on December 23, 1918. The Brighton Line platform opened on May 29, 1919 followed by the Culver Line on May 1, 1920. When the Culver Line passed from BMT to IND control in 1954, the transfer became inter-division. The station is a terminal for all four lines and services.
Coney Island–Stillwell Avenue	four island platforms, one for each line, on the same level	BMT Sea Beach Line	N	The first connection between lines was between the Sea Beach and the West End lines on December 23, 1918. The Brighton Line platform opened on May 29, 1919 followed by the Culver Line on May 1, 1920. When the Culver Line passed from BMT to IND control in 1954, the transfer became inter-division. The station is a terminal for all four lines and services.
Coney Island–Stillwell Avenue	four island platforms, one for each line, on the same level	BMT West End Line	D	The first connection between lines was between the Sea Beach and the West End lines on December 23, 1918. The Brighton Line platform opened on May 29, 1919 followed by the Culver Line on May 1, 1920. When the Culver Line passed from BMT to IND control in 1954, the transfer became inter-division. The station is a terminal for all four lines and services.
Borough Hall/Court Street	Borough Hall	IRT Broadway–Seventh Avenue Line	2; 3	The BMT Fourth Avenue Line is connected to the IRT Eastern Parkway Line and IRT Broadway–Seventh Avenue Line via a passageway at Borough Hall. This was placed inside fare control on July 1, 1948.
Borough Hall/Court Street	Borough Hall	IRT Eastern Parkway Line	4; 5	The BMT Fourth Avenue Line is connected to the IRT Eastern Parkway Line and IRT Broadway–Seventh Avenue Line via a passageway at Borough Hall. This was placed inside fare control on July 1, 1948.
Borough Hall/Court Street	Court Street	BMT Fourth Avenue Line	N R W	The BMT Fourth Avenue Line is connected to the IRT Eastern Parkway Line and IRT Broadway–Seventh Avenue Line via a passageway at Borough Hall. This was placed inside fare control on July 1, 1948.
DeKalb Avenue	cross-platform interchange	BMT Fourth Avenue Line	D N R W	This station, opened on June 19, 1915 and completed on August 1, 1920, has been a major transfer point between BMT services, with the lines splitting north and south of the station.
DeKalb Avenue	cross-platform interchange	BMT Brighton Line	B Q	This station, opened on June 19, 1915 and completed on August 1, 1920, has been a major transfer point between BMT services, with the lines splitting north and south of the station.
Franklin Avenue–Fulton Street	Franklin Avenue	BMT Franklin Avenue Line	S	A passageway connects the underground IND Fulton Street Line and the end of the elevated BMT Franklin Avenue Line. The transfer here was added on June 1, 1940, immediately after the elevated BMT Fulton Street Line (to which Franklin Avenue Line passengers could transfer) closed. Transfers were made with paper transfer slips until October 18, 1999, when the Franklin Avenue Line reopened after reconstruction, doing away with the last remaining paper transfer on the Subway.
Franklin Avenue–Fulton Street	Franklin Avenue	IND Fulton Street Line	A C	A passageway connects the underground IND Fulton Street Line and the end of the elevated BMT Franklin Avenue Line. The transfer here was added on June 1, 1940, immediately after the elevated BMT Fulton Street Line (to which Franklin Avenue Line passengers could transfer) closed. Transfers were made with paper transfer slips until October 18, 1999, when the Franklin Avenue Line reopened after reconstruction, doing away with the last remaining paper transfer on the Subway.
Franklin Avenue–Fulton Street	Franklin Avenue	BMT Fulton Street Line	N/A	A passageway connects the underground IND Fulton Street Line and the end of the elevated BMT Franklin Avenue Line. The transfer here was added on June 1, 1940, immediately after the elevated BMT Fulton Street Line (to which Franklin Avenue Line passengers could transfer) closed. Transfers were made with paper transfer slips until October 18, 1999, when the Franklin Avenue Line reopened after reconstruction, doing away with the last remaining paper transfer on the Subway.
Franklin Avenue/Botanic Garden	Botanic Garden	BMT Franklin Avenue Line	S	A transfer passageway between the IRT Eastern Parkway Line and BMT Franklin Avenue Line was added on October 18, 1999, when the Franklin Avenue Line was reopened. It was formerly occupied and blocked by a Transit police station.
Franklin Avenue/Botanic Garden	Franklin Avenue–Medgar Evers College	IRT Eastern Parkway Line	2; 3; 4; 5	A transfer passageway between the IRT Eastern Parkway Line and BMT Franklin Avenue Line was added on October 18, 1999, when the Franklin Avenue Line was reopened. It was formerly occupied and blocked by a Transit police station.
Hoyt–Schermerhorn Streets	cross-platform interchange	IND Crosstown Line	G	The station is laid out on six tracks: the two innermost tracks serve the Crosstown Line, the next two outer tracks serve the express Fulton Street Line and the outermost two serve the local Fulton Street Line. The station became a transfer station upon its opening on April 9, 1936 between Fulton Street Line trains running to/from Manhattan on the Fulton Street express tracks and the HH (Court Street Shuttle) on the Fulton Street local tracks. (The shuttle was discontinued on June 1, 1946.) The Crosstown Line and its transfer opened on July 1, 1937.
Hoyt–Schermerhorn Streets	cross-platform interchange	IND Fulton Street Line	A C	
Jay Street–MetroTech	cross-platform interchange	IND Culver Line	F <F>	The station became a cross-platform transfer station when the Fulton Street Line opened in 1936. A transfer passageway was opened to the BMT Fourth Avenue Line on December 10, 2010, concurrently with renaming the complex to Jay Street – MetroTech.
Jay Street–MetroTech	cross-platform interchange	IND Fulton Street Line	A C	The station became a cross-platform transfer station when the Fulton Street Line opened in 1936. A transfer passageway was opened to the BMT Fourth Avenue Line on December 10, 2010, concurrently with renaming the complex to Jay Street – MetroTech.
Jay Street–MetroTech	Jay Street–MetroTech	BMT Fourth Avenue Line	N R W	The station became a cross-platform transfer station when the Fulton Street Line opened in 1936. A transfer passageway was opened to the BMT Fourth Avenue Line on December 10, 2010, concurrently with renaming the complex to Jay Street – MetroTech.
Junius Street/Livonia Avenue	Junius Street	IRT New Lots Line	3; 4	A free out-of-system transfer on nights and weekends was introduced on April 26, 2019 as part of the L shutdown, and introduced permanently in February 2020. It is planned to convert an overpass running between the Junius Street and Livonia Avenue stations into a in-system transfer passage between them, due to increasing ridership and plans for additional housing in the area. In February 2020, the MTA awarded a design–build contract to construct the free transfer and associated elevator upgrades.
Junius Street/Livonia Avenue	Livonia Avenue	BMT Canarsie Line	L	
Metropolitan Avenue/Lorimer Street	Lorimer Street	BMT Canarsie Line	L	A passageway between the BMT Canarsie Line and IND Crosstown Line was placed inside fare control on July 1, 1948.
Metropolitan Avenue/Lorimer Street	Metropolitan Avenue	IND Crosstown Line	G	A passageway between the BMT Canarsie Line and IND Crosstown Line was placed inside fare control on July 1, 1948.
Myrtle–Wyckoff Avenues	Myrtle–Wyckoff Avenues	BMT Canarsie Line	L	The station became a transfer station when the Canarsie Line opened in 1928.
Myrtle–Wyckoff Avenues	Myrtle–Wyckoff Avenues	BMT Myrtle Avenue Line	M	The station became a transfer station when the Canarsie Line opened in 1928.
62nd Street/New Utrecht Avenue	62nd Street	BMT West End Line	D R W	The station became a transfer station when the West End Line opened in 1916.
62nd Street/New Utrecht Avenue	New Utrecht Avenue	BMT Sea Beach Line	N W	The station became a transfer station when the West End Line opened in 1916.
Prospect Park	cross-platform interchange	BMT Brighton Line	B Q	The station became a transfer station when the connection to the Brighton Line subway from Seventh Avenue opened in 1920.
Prospect Park	cross-platform interchange	BMT Franklin Avenue Line	S	The station became a transfer station when the connection to the Brighton Line subway from Seventh Avenue opened in 1920.
Canarsie–Rockaway Parkway	same-level interchange	BMT Canarsie Line	L	The BMT Canarsie Line on the surface south of Rockaway Parkway became a streetcar line on October 26, 1917 with a free transfer to the Canarsie Line. On November 21, 1942, the private right-of-way was closed, and the transfer was instead given to the Rockaway Parkway Line, now the B42 bus route. The streetcars, later buses, stop inside fare control.
Canarsie–Rockaway Parkway	same-level interchange	Rockaway Parkway Line	B42 bus	The BMT Canarsie Line on the surface south of Rockaway Parkway became a streetcar line on October 26, 1917 with a free transfer to the Canarsie Line. On November 21, 1942, the private right-of-way was closed, and the transfer was instead given to the Rockaway Parkway Line, now the B42 bus route. The streetcars, later buses, stop inside fare control.
West Eighth Street–New York Aquarium	upper level	BMT Brighton Line	Q	Prior to the opening of the Culver Line in 1920, local Brighton Line trains used the lower level and express Brighton Line trains used the upper level. The transfer station commenced with the opening of the Culver Line on the lower level under the Brooklyn Rapid Transit Company (the predecessor to the BMT). Level usage varied over the years with different Brighton services using the lower level at different times. When the Culver Line passed from BMT to IND control in 1954, the transfer became inter-division. Shortly thereafter, the Brighton Line track connection to the lower level was severed, thereby allowing each line to have exclusive use of their own levels.
West Eighth Street–New York Aquarium	lower level	IND Culver Line	F <F>	

=== Former transfers ===
On October 30, 1954, a connection between the IND Brooklyn Line and the BMT Culver Line opened, and the Culver Line was transferred from BMT to IND control. Service through the new connection commenced, and the BMT Culver Shuttle was instituted between Ditmas Avenue and Ninth Avenue, making Ditmas Avenue an inter-division transfer station. When the BMT Culver Shuttle ceased on May 11, 1975, the station was left to be served by the IND Culver Line only.

On March 5, 1944, when the elevated BMT Myrtle Avenue Line was removed from the Brooklyn Bridge elevated tracks, and cut back from Park Row to Bridge–Jay Streets, a paper transfer was added at Bridge–Jay Streets to the Brooklyn Bridge trolley lines, specifically the Smith Street Line, DeKalb Avenue Line, and Seventh Avenue Line. Bridge trolleys were discontinued on March 6, 1950, and the transfer was replaced with one to the IND Sixth Avenue Line. Manhattan-bound passengers received a transfer when boarding the Myrtle Avenue Line west of Broadway, but Brooklyn-bound passengers could only get one when entering at Broadway – Nassau Street, near Park Row. In addition, similar trolley transfers were provided at High Street – Brooklyn Bridge, at the Brooklyn end of the bridge. The Myrtle Avenue Line west of Broadway closed on October 3, 1969, and the transfer was replaced with one to the B54 bus route, which ran under the line. The transfers at High Street – Brooklyn Bridge were discontinued at some point, but the B54 transfer remained for a long time.

When the Broadway Elevated spur to Broadway Ferry closed to passengers on July 2, 1916, a paper transfer was added to the Broadway Ferry Shuttle streetcar line. The shuttle was moved from Broadway Ferry to Lorimer Street when the BMT Canarsie Line opened through Williamsburg on June 30, 1924, and Broadway Line streetcars were rerouted to the ferry. Later the transfer was to the Meeker Avenue Line, now part of the B24 bus route.

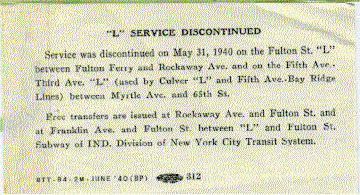
Notice of free transfers at Rockaway Avenue

A paper transfer was added at Rockaway Avenue between the temporary east end of the underground IND Fulton Street Line and the new west end of the elevated BMT Fulton Street Line, immediately after the BMT Fulton Street Line was closed west of Rockaway Avenue on June 1, 1940. When the BMT Fulton Street Line was closed east of Rockaway Avenue on April 27, 1956, these transfers were discontinued.

The lower level, serving the Jamaica Line, opened in 1888. The station became a transfer station when the Myrtle Avenue Elevated platform on the upper level opened in 1889. When Myrtle Avenue Line service west of this station ended in 1969, the upper level was abandoned and all Myrtle Avenue Line trains from the east merged onto the Jamaica Line tracks.

== Queens ==
Station complex	Individual stations	Lines	Services	Notes
Court Square–23rd Street	Court Square–23rd Street	IND Queens Boulevard Line	E F <F>	An $8.5 million 350-foot (100 m) passageway connecting the IND Queens Boulevard Line with the IND Crosstown Line was built by Citicorp, who was building the Citicorp Building above. It opened in December 1988. A MetroCard transfer to the IRT Flushing Line was added on December 16, 2001, when the IND 63rd Street Line was completed and the G was cut back to Court Square during peak hours. This transfer was free for MetroCard users within two hours of the original boarding. A passageway was completed in June 2011 between the Flushing and Crosstown lines, which ended the MetroCard transfer.
Court Square–23rd Street	Court Square	IND Crosstown Line	G	
Court Square–23rd Street	Court Square	IRT Flushing Line	7 <7>	
Jamaica Center–York College	lower level	BMT Archer Avenue Line	J Z	Both levels of the station opened on December 11, 1988.
Jamaica Center–York College	upper level	IND Archer Avenue Line	E	Both levels of the station opened on December 11, 1988.
Queensboro Plaza	cross-platform interchange on two levels	BMT Astoria Line	N W	As part of the Dual Contracts, the Astoria Line and Flushing Line were operated by both the Interborough Rapid Transit Company and the Brooklyn–Manhattan Transit Corporation. This arrangement remained through unification, until, starting October 17, 1949, the Astoria Line became BMT-only and the Flushing Line IRT-only. A cross-platform transfer at Queensboro Plaza, where the lines meet, was made available by closing the north (BMT) half of the station and routing all trains into the south (IRT) half.
Queensboro Plaza	cross-platform interchange on two levels	IRT Flushing Line	7 <7>	
Queensboro Plaza	Queensboro Plaza	IRT Second Avenue Line	N/A	
Jackson Heights–Roosevelt Avenue/74th Street	74th Street–Broadway	IRT Flushing Line	7	The elevated IRT Flushing Line and underground IND Queens Boulevard Line are connected inside fare control in Jackson Heights. A paper transfer was added on July 1, 1948, and was later replaced by a passageway in 2005 when the station was rebuilt.
Jackson Heights–Roosevelt Avenue/74th Street	Jackson Heights–Roosevelt Avenue	IND Queens Boulevard Line	E F <F> M R	The elevated IRT Flushing Line and underground IND Queens Boulevard Line are connected inside fare control in Jackson Heights. A paper transfer was added on July 1, 1948, and was later replaced by a passageway in 2005 when the station was rebuilt.
Sutphin Boulevard–Archer Avenue–JFK Airport	lower level	BMT Archer Avenue Line	J Z	Both levels of the station opened on December 11, 1988.
Sutphin Boulevard–Archer Avenue–JFK Airport	upper level	IND Archer Avenue Line	E	Both levels of the station opened on December 11, 1988.

== See also ==
- New York City Subway stations
- List of New York City Subway stations
- List of New York City Subway terminals
- List of closed New York City Subway stations
- List of Staten Island Railway stations
- Accessibility of the Metropolitan Transportation Authority
