= List of New York City Subway terminals =

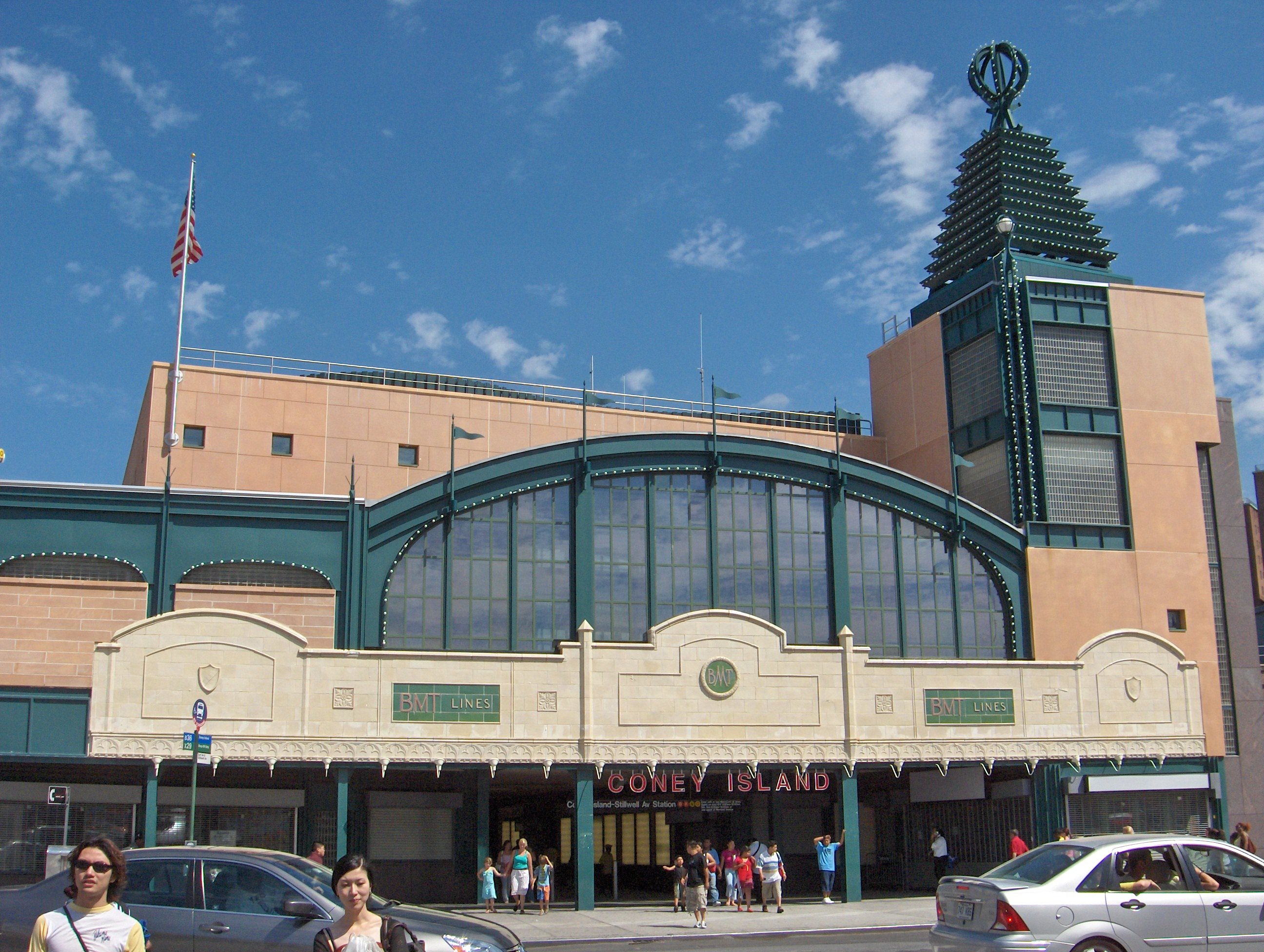
Coney Island–Stillwell Avenue

Bumper block at the end of the 42nd Street Shuttle tracks in Times Square

In the New York City Subway there are three types of terminal stations:

1. Station where a train proceeds beyond the station, like at a non-terminal station, and returns to service on another track.
2. Station with one or more tracks, often with bumper blocks at their end. A train terminates on all applicable tracks and changes direction.
3. Station where a train terminates on a track that is (or can be) also used as a through track.

Also, a station can be:

- terminal-only (like Flushing–Main Street (IRT Flushing Line))
- terminal for some services and through station for other services (like Bedford Park Boulevard (IND Concourse Line))

== The listing ==
This is a list of terminal stations on the New York City Subway. For all stations, see list of New York City Subway stations.

Disabled access	Service	Station	Line	Details	Listed on map? (Note: A green check mark means that the terminal is listed as such on the official New York City Subway diagram. A red check mark means that it is listed as such on the official late night subway diagram.)
	"1" train	Van Cortlandt Park–242nd Street	IRT Broadway–Seventh Avenue Line	North terminal for 1 trains at all times	Shown on official map Shown on late-night map
	"1" train	238th Street	IRT Broadway–Seventh Avenue Line	Some southbound rush hour 1 trains begin at this station	
	"1" train	215th Street	IRT Broadway–Seventh Avenue Line	Some northbound a.m. rush hour 1 trains and evening trains terminate at this station	
	"1" train	137th Street–City College	IRT Broadway–Seventh Avenue Line	Some northbound a.m. rush hour 1 trains terminate at this station Some southbound a.m. rush hour 1 trains begin at this station	
Disabled access	"1" train	South Ferry	IRT Broadway–Seventh Avenue Line	South terminal for 1 always	Shown on official map Shown on late-night map
	"2" train	Wakefield–241st Street	IRT White Plains Road Line	North terminal for 2 trains at all times	Shown on official map Shown on late-night map
	"2" train "5" train	Nereid Avenue	IRT White Plains Road Line	North terminal for 5 trains during rush hours in peak direction and some 2 trains during the a.m. rush hour	(Note: 5 only)
Disabled access	"2" train "5" train	Flatbush Avenue–Brooklyn College	IRT Nostrand Avenue Line	South terminal for 2 trains at all times South terminal for 5 trains weekdays until 8:45 PM	Shown on official map Shown on late-night map
	"3" train	Harlem–148th Street	IRT Lenox Avenue Line	North terminal for 3 always	Shown on official map Shown on late-night map
	"3" train	145th Street	IRT Lenox Avenue Line	Some southbound a.m. rush hour 3 trains begin at this station	
Disabled access	"3" train	Times Square–42nd Street	IRT Broadway–Seventh Avenue Line	Some northbound a.m. late night 3 trains begin at this station	
Disabled access	"3" train	34th Street–Penn Station	IRT Broadway–Seventh Avenue Line	South terminal for 3 trains late nights	Shown on late-night map
	"2" train "3" train "4" train "5" train	New Lots Avenue	IRT New Lots Line	South terminal for limited rush hour 2 trains, 3 trains at all times except late nights, 4 trains late nights and limited rush hour service, and limited rush hour 5 trains	(Note: 3 only) (Note: 4 only)
	"4" train	Woodlawn	IRT Jerome Avenue Line	North terminal for 4 trains at all times	Shown on official map Shown on late-night map
	"4" train	Bedford Park Boulevard–Lehman College	IRT Jerome Avenue Line	Some southbound rush hour 4 trains begin at this station Some northbound p.m. rush hour 4 trains terminate at this station	
	"4" train	Kingsbridge Road	IRT Jerome Avenue Line	Some southbound p.m. rush hour 4 trains begin at this station	
	"4" train	Burnside Avenue	IRT Jerome Avenue Line	Some northbound rush hour 4 trains terminate at this station	
Disabled access	"4" train "5" train	Bowling Green	IRT Lexington Avenue Line	South terminal for 5 trains evenings and weekends as well as some rush hour service, and for some rush hour 4 trains	(Note: 5 train only)
Disabled access	"4" train "5" train	Crown Heights–Utica Avenue	IRT Eastern Parkway Line	South terminal for 4 trains at all times except late nights and limited rush hour 5 trains	Shown on official map
	"5" train	Eastchester–Dyre Avenue	IRT Dyre Avenue Line	North terminal for 5 trains at all times	Shown on official map Shown on late-night map
Disabled access	"5" train	Gun Hill Road	IRT White Plains Road Line	North terminal for some northbound a.m. reverse-peak 5 trains.	
Disabled access	"5" train	East 180th Street	IRT White Plains Road Line	South terminal for 5 trains during late nights Some southbound rush hour 5 trains begin at this station Some northbound a.m. rush hour 5 trains terminate at this station	Shown on late-night map
Disabled access	"6" train "6" express train	Pelham Bay Park	IRT Pelham Line	North terminal for <6> Express trains during rush hours and middays, and 6 Local trains other times	Shown on official map Shown on late-night map
	"6" train	Parkchester	IRT Pelham Line	North terminal for 6 Local trains during rush hours and middays	Shown on official map
	"6" train	Third Avenue–138th Street	IRT Pelham Line	Some southbound a.m. rush hour 6 trains begin at this station Some northbound a.m. rush hour 6 trains terminate at this station	
Disabled access	"6" train "6" express train	Brooklyn Bridge–City Hall	IRT Lexington Avenue Line	South terminal for 6 Local trains at all times, and <6> Express trains during rush hours and middays	Shown on official map Shown on late-night map
Disabled access	"7" train "7" express train	Flushing–Main Street	IRT Flushing Line	North terminal for 7 Local trains at all times, and <7> Express trains during rush hours and early evenings	Shown on official map Shown on late-night map
	"7" train	Mets–Willets Point	IRT Flushing Line	Some southbound a.m. rush hour 7 trains begin at this station Some northbound rush hour 7 trains terminate at this station	
	"7" train	111th Street	IRT Flushing Line	Some southbound rush hour 7 trains begin at this station	
Disabled access	"7" train "7" express train	34th Street–Hudson Yards	IRT Flushing Line	South terminal for 7 Local trains at all times, and <7> Express during rush hours and early evenings	Shown on official map Shown on late-night map
Disabled access	42nd Street Shuttle	Times Square	IRT 42nd Street Shuttle	North terminal for the 42nd Street Shuttle at all times except late nights	Shown on official map
Disabled access	42nd Street Shuttle	Grand Central	IRT 42nd Street Shuttle	South terminal for the 42nd Street Shuttle at all times except late nights	Shown on official map
Disabled access	"A" train	Inwood–207th Street	IND Eighth Avenue Line	North terminal for A trains at all times	Shown on official map Shown on late-night map
	"A" train	Dyckman Street	IND Eighth Avenue Line	Some northbound a.m. rush hour A trains terminate at this station Some southbound p.m. rush hour A trains begin at this station	
Disabled access	"A" train "C" train	168th Street	IND Eighth Avenue Line	North terminal C trains all times except late nights Some northbound a.m. rush hour A trains terminate at this station Some southbound p.m. rush hour A trains begin at this station	(Note: C only)
Disabled access	"A" train "C" train	Euclid Avenue	IND Fulton Street Line	North terminal for the Lefferts Boulevard Shuttle A trains during late nights South terminal for C trains at all times except late nights	Shown on official map Shown on late-night map
Disabled access	"A" train	Ozone Park–Lefferts Boulevard	IND Fulton Street Line	South terminal for A trains at all times (as the Lefferts Boulevard Shuttle during late nights)	Shown on official map Shown on late-night map
Disabled access	"A" train	Far Rockaway–Mott Avenue	IND Rockaway Line	South terminal for A trains at all times	Shown on official map Shown on late-night map
Disabled access	"A" train Rockaway Park Shuttle	Rockaway Park–Beach 116th Street	IND Rockaway Line	South terminal for A trains during rush hours in the peak direction and the Rockaway Park Shuttle at all times	Shown on official map Shown on late-night map
	Rockaway Park Shuttle	Broad Channel	IND Rockaway Line	North terminal for the Rockaway Park Shuttle at all times	Shown on official map Shown on late-night map
Disabled access	"B" train "D" train	Bedford Park Boulevard	IND Concourse Line	North terminal for B trains during rush hours and alternating trains during middays Some southbound a.m. rush hour D trains begin at this station Some northbound a.m. rush hour D trains terminate at this station	Shown on official map
Disabled access	"B" train	Kingsbridge Road	IND Concourse Line	Some northbound a.m. rush hour B trains terminate at this station	
	"b" train	145th Street	IND Concourse Line	North terminal for alternating B trains during middays and all trains during evenings	
	"b" train "q" train	Brighton Beach	BMT Brighton Line	South terminal for B trains during weekdays, and for one evening weekday Q train.	(Note: B only)
	"D" train	Norwood–205th Street	IND Concourse Line	North terminal for D trains at all times	Shown on official map Shown on late-night map
Disabled access	"D" train	Broadway–Lafayette Street	IND Sixth Avenue Line	Two northbound evening D trains begin at this station.	
Disabled access	"D" train "R" train "W" train	Bay Parkway	BMT West End Line	South terminal for some southbound evening D trains, one southbound rush-hour R train, and some southbound rush-hour W trains during weekdays	
	"D" train	25th Avenue	BMT West End Line	Some morning northbound D trains begin at this station.	
Disabled access	"E" train "J" train "Z" train	Jamaica Center–York College	IND/BMT Archer Avenue Lines	North terminal for E and J trains at all times, and for Z trains during rush hours in the peak direction	Shown on official map Shown on late-night map
Disabled access	"E" train	World Trade Center	IND Eighth Avenue Line	South terminal for E trains at all times	Shown on official map Shown on late-night map
Disabled access	"E" train "F" train	Jamaica–179th Street	IND Queens Boulevard Line	North terminal for limited rush hour E trains, and for F trains at all times	(Note: F only)
	"F" train	Kings Highway	IND Culver Line	Some southbound rush hour F trains terminate at this station Some northbound rush hour F trains begin at this station	(Note: This is noted on some signs on platforms in the F service's stations.)
	"F" train	Avenue X	IND Culver Line	Some northbound a.m. rush hour F trains begin at this station	
Disabled access	"F" train "G" train	Church Avenue	IND Culver Line	South terminal for G trains at all times, and south terminal for one southbound a.m. rush hour and one northbound a.m. rush hour F train.	(Note: G only)
Disabled access	"G" train	Court Square	IND Crosstown Line	North terminal for G trains at all times	Shown on official map Shown on late-night map
	"J" train	Broadway Junction	BMT Jamaica Line	Some northbound a.m. rush hour J trains begin and terminate at this station Some p.m. rush hour southbound J trains begin at this station	
	"J" train "Z" train	Broad Street	BMT Nassau Street Line	South terminal for J trains at all times, and Z trains during rush hours in the peak direction	Shown on official map
Disabled access	"L" train	Eighth Avenue	BMT Canarsie Line	North terminal for L trains at all times	Shown on official map Shown on late-night map
Disabled access	"L" train	Myrtle–Wyckoff Avenues	BMT Canarsie Line	Some northbound a.m. rush hour L trains begin at this station Some southbound a.m. rush hour L trains terminate at this station	
	"L" train	East 105th Street	BMT Canarsie Line	Some northbound rush hour L trains begin at this station.	
Disabled access	"L" train	Canarsie–Rockaway Parkway	BMT Canarsie Line	South terminal for L always	Shown on official map Shown on late-night map
Disabled access	"M" train	Middle Village–Metropolitan Avenue	BMT Myrtle Avenue Line	South terminal for M trains during weekdays, north terminal for M trains during weekday evenings, all late nights and weekends	Shown on official map Shown on late-night map
	"M" train	Myrtle Avenue	BMT Jamaica Line	South terminal for M trains late nights	Shown on late-night map
	"M" train	Essex Street	BMT Nassau Street Line	South terminal for M trains during weekday evenings and weekends	Shown on official map
Disabled access	"m" train "R" train	Forest Hills–71st Avenue	IND Queens Boulevard Line	North terminal for M trains during weekdays except evenings and R trains at all times except late evenings and late nights.	Shown on official map
	"N" train "W" train	Astoria–Ditmars Boulevard	BMT Astoria Line	North terminal for N at all times and W trains during weekdays	Shown on official map
Disabled access	"N" train "Q" train "R" train	96th Street	IND Second Avenue Line	North terminal for limited rush hour N trains, Q trains at all times, and one rush-hour R train	(Note: Q only)
	"R" train "W" train	Whitehall Street	BMT Broadway Line	South terminal for W trains during weekdays North terminal for R trains during late nights	(Note: W only) (Note: R only)
Disabled access	"R" train	Queens Plaza	IND Queens Boulevard Line	Most northbound late evening trains terminate at this station	
	"R" train	36th Street	BMT Fourth Avenue Line	North terminal for some southbound R trains during late nights and south terminal for some northbound afternoon R trains	
Disabled access	"R" train	59th Street	BMT Fourth Avenue Line	South terminal for one southbound a.m. rush hour R train	
	"R" train	Bay Ridge–95th Street	BMT Fourth Avenue Line	South terminal for R always	Shown on official map Shown on late-night map
	"N" train "W" train	86th Street	BMT Sea Beach Line	South terminal for limited rush hour W trains. Some northbound rush hour N trains begin at this station.	
Disabled access	"D" train "F" train "N" train "Q" train	Coney Island–Stillwell Avenue	BMT Brighton Line; IND Culver Line; BMT Sea Beach Line; BMT West End Line	South terminal for D, F, N, and Q always	Shown on official map Shown on late-night map
Disabled access	Franklin Avenue Shuttle	Franklin Avenue	BMT Franklin Avenue Line	North terminal for Franklin Avenue Shuttle always	Shown on official map Shown on late-night map
Disabled access	Franklin Avenue Shuttle	Prospect Park	BMT Brighton Line	South terminal for Franklin Avenue Shuttle always	Shown on official map Shown on late-night map

== See also ==
- New York City Subway stations
- List of New York City Subway stations
- List of New York City Subway transfer stations
- List of closed New York City Subway stations
- List of Staten Island Railway stations
- Accessibility of the Metropolitan Transportation Authority
