= 125th Regiment =

125th Regiment may refer to:

- 125th Field Artillery Regiment, United States
- 125th Guards Bomber Aviation Regiment, Soviet Union
- 125th Infantry Regiment (United States)
- 125th Napier's Rifles, British Indian Army
- 125th Regiment of Foot, British Army

== American Civil War regiments ==
- 125th Illinois Infantry Regiment
- 125th New York Infantry Regiment
- 125th Ohio Infantry Regiment
- 125th Pennsylvania Infantry Regiment
- 125th United States Colored Infantry Regiment

== See also ==
- 125th Brigade (disambiguation)
- 125th Division (disambiguation)
- 125th (disambiguation)
