= 125th =

125th may refer to:

- 125th Anniversary of the Confederation of Canada Medal, a commemorative medal celebrating the 125th anniversary of the Confederation of Canada
- 125th Battalion (1st Overseas Battalion of 38th Regiment Dufferin Rifles), CEF, a unit in the Canadian Expeditionary Force during the First World War
- 125th Delaware General Assembly, a meeting of the Delaware Senate and the Delaware House of Representatives
- 125th Division (People's Republic of China), a division deployed by the People's Republic of China
- 125th Division (Imperial Japanese Army), an infantry division of the Imperial Japanese Army
- 125th Field Artillery Regiment, field artillery regiment of the Minnesota Army National Guard
- 125th Fighter Squadron, a unit of the Oklahoma Air National Guard that flies the F-16C Fighting Falcon
- 125th Fighter Wing (125 FW) is an Air National Guard unit located at Jacksonville International Airport, Florida
- 125th Illinois Volunteer Infantry Regiment, an infantry regiment in the Union Army during the American Civil War
- 125th IOC Session at the Buenos Aires Hilton in Buenos Aires, Argentina, from 7 to 10 September 2013
- 125th meridian east, a line of longitude 125° east of Greenwich
- 125th meridian west, a line of longitude 125° west of Greenwich
- 125th Mixed Brigade, unit of the Spanish Republican Army that participated in the Spanish Civil War
- 125th Napier's Rifles, an infantry regiment of the British Indian Army
- 125th New York Volunteer Infantry Regiment, a volunteer regiment from Rensselaer County, New York, during the American Civil War
- 125th Ohio Infantry (or 125th OVI) was an infantry regiment in the Union Army during the American Civil War
- 125th Regiment of Foot, an infantry regiment of the British Army, created in 1794 and disbanded in 1796
- 125th Special Tactics Squadron, a military organization under the civilian direction of the Oregon Military Department
- 125th Street (disambiguation)
- 125th Street (IND Eighth Avenue Line), an express station on the IND Eighth Avenue Line of the New York City Subway
- 125th Street (IRT Broadway – Seventh Avenue Line), a local station on the IRT Broadway – Seventh Avenue Line of the New York City Subway
- 125th Street (IRT Lenox Avenue Line), a station on the IRT Lenox Avenue Line of the New York City Subway
- 125th Street (IRT Lexington Avenue Line), the northernmost Manhattan station on the IRT Lexington Avenue Line of the New York City Subway
- 125th Street (IRT Ninth Avenue Line), a station on the demolished IRT Ninth Avenue Line
- 125th Street (IRT Second Avenue Line), a station on the demolished IRT Second Avenue Line
- 125th Street (IRT Third Avenue Line), a station on the demolished IRT Third Avenue Line
- 125th Street (Manhattan), an east–west in the New York City borough of Manhattan, the "Main Street" of Harlem
- 125th Street Hudson River bridge, a proposed bridge across the Hudson River
- 125th Weather Flight (125th WF) is a combat weather team located at Tulsa International Airport in Tulsa, Oklahoma
- Harlem-125th Street (Metro-North station) Metro-North Railroad Following station Grand Central Terminus
- 125th Ohio General Assembly, the legislative body of the state of Ohio in 2003 and 2004
- Ohio House of Representatives membership, 125th General Assembly, in session in 2003 and 2004
- Ohio Senate membership, 125th General Assembly comprised the state legislature of the U.S. state of Ohio
- Small Talk at 125th and Lenox, the debut album of soul musician and poet Gil Scott-Heron, released in 1970 on Flying Dutchman Records

== See also ==
- 125 (number)
- AD 125, the year 125 (CXXV) of the Julian calendar
