= 125th Division =

In military terms, 125th Division or 125th Infantry Division may refer to:

- 125th Division (People's Republic of China), formed 1948, later redesignated as the 129th Division
- 125th Division (2nd Formation) (People's Republic of China), 1966–1985
- 125th Infantry Division (Wehrmacht), Germany
- 125th Division (Imperial Japanese Army)
- 125th Guards Rifle Division, Soviet Union
- 125th Motor Rifle Division, Soviet Union
- 125th Rifle Division, Soviet Union

== See also ==
- List of military divisions by number
- 125th Brigade (disambiguation)
- 125th Regiment (disambiguation)
- 125th Squadron (disambiguation)
- 125th (disambiguation)
