= New York City Subway stations =

Aspect of rapid transit system

The current New York City Subway rail system map. The Staten Island Railway (on the bottom left portion of the map) is also owned by the MTA, and is operated by the Department of Subways, but is a separate system. AirTrain JFK (the dark green line at the middle right) and PATH (both light purple lines at the middle left) are operated by the Port Authority of New York and New Jersey

The New York City Subway is a rapid transit system that serves four of the five boroughs of New York City, New York: the Bronx, Brooklyn, Manhattan, and Queens. (Note: The remaining New York City borough, Staten Island, is served by the Staten Island Railway, a rapid transit system also operated by the MTA but not connected physically to the New York City Subway.) Its operator is the New York City Transit Authority, which is itself controlled by the Metropolitan Transportation Authority of New York. In 2025, an average of 4.002 million passengers used the system on weekdays, making it the busiest rapid transit system in the United States and putting it among the 20 busiest in the world.

The present New York City Subway system is composed of three formerly separate systems that merged in 1940: the Interborough Rapid Transit Company (IRT), the Brooklyn–Manhattan Transit Corporation (BMT), and the Independent Subway System (IND). The privately held IRT, founded in 1902, constructed and operated the first underground railway line in New York City. (Note: Prior to the founding of the IRT, the Beach Pneumatic Transit was an 1869 demonstration for an underground transit system in New York City, measuring 312 feet (95 m) in length. The concept, heavily based on pneumatic tubes, was not adopted.) The opening of the first line on October 27, 1904, is commonly cited as the opening of the modern New York City Subway, although some elevated lines of the IRT and BMT that were initially incorporated into the New York City Subway system but then demolished predate this. The oldest sections of elevated lines still in operation were built in 1885. The BMT, founded in 1923 and also privately held, was formed from the bankruptcy of the Brooklyn Rapid Transit Company. The IND was created by the City of New York in 1921 to be a municipally owned competitor of the two private companies. Unification in June 1940 by the New York City Board of Transportation brought the three systems under one operator. The New York City Transit Authority, created in 1953 to be a public benefit corporation that acquired the rapid transit and surface line (buses and streetcars) infrastructure of the Board of Transportation, remains the operator of the New York City Subway today.

The official count of stations is 472; however, this tabulation classifies some transfer stations as two or more stations, which are called "station complexes" within the nomenclature of the New York City Subway. If station complexes are counted as one station each, the number of stations is 423. Thirty-two such station complexes exist. The reason for the higher count generally lies in the history of the New York City Subway: IRT, BMT and IND stations are usually counted separately, particularly if their lines are not parallel and are adjacent to or on another level to each other.

There are numerous New York City Subway stations that are closed, many of which stem from the demolition of elevated lines once operated by the IRT and the BMT that were made largely but not completely redundant to underground lines subsequently constructed.

The newest New York City Subway stations are part of the Second Avenue Subway, and are located on Second Avenue at 72nd, 86th and 96th streets. They opened on January 1, 2017.

Stations that share identical street names are disambiguated by the line name and/or the cross street each is associated with. For example, "125th Street station" can refer to four separate stations: 125th Street on the IND Eighth Avenue Line (A, B, C, and D trains), the IRT Broadway–Seventh Avenue Line (1 train), the IRT Lenox Avenue Line (2 and 3 trains), and the IRT Lexington Avenue Line (4, 5, 6, and <6> trains). This situation occurs numerous times.

== Station facilities and amenities ==
A 7 train arriving at the Vernon Boulevard–Jackson Avenue station

Of the 472 stations in the system, 470 are served 24 hours a day. (Note: The Times Square and Grand Central stations of the IRT 42nd Street Shuttle are closed during late nights.) Underground stations in the New York City Subway are typically accessed by staircases going down from street level. Many of these staircases are painted in a common shade of green, with slight or significant variations in design. Other stations have unique entrances reflective of their location or date of construction. Several station entrance stairs, for example, are integrated into adjacent buildings. Nearly all station entrances feature color-coded globe or square lamps signifying their status as an entrance (see below).

Out of all the stations on the New York City Subway,

- 275 are fully underground (59%)
- 153 are elevated stations (32%)
- 29 are on an embankment (6%)
- 15 are open-cut stations (3%)

This means that 61% of the stations are below the surface (59% being fully underground and about 2% with most of the station below the surface). 39% of stations are above the surface or overground.

=== Entrances ===
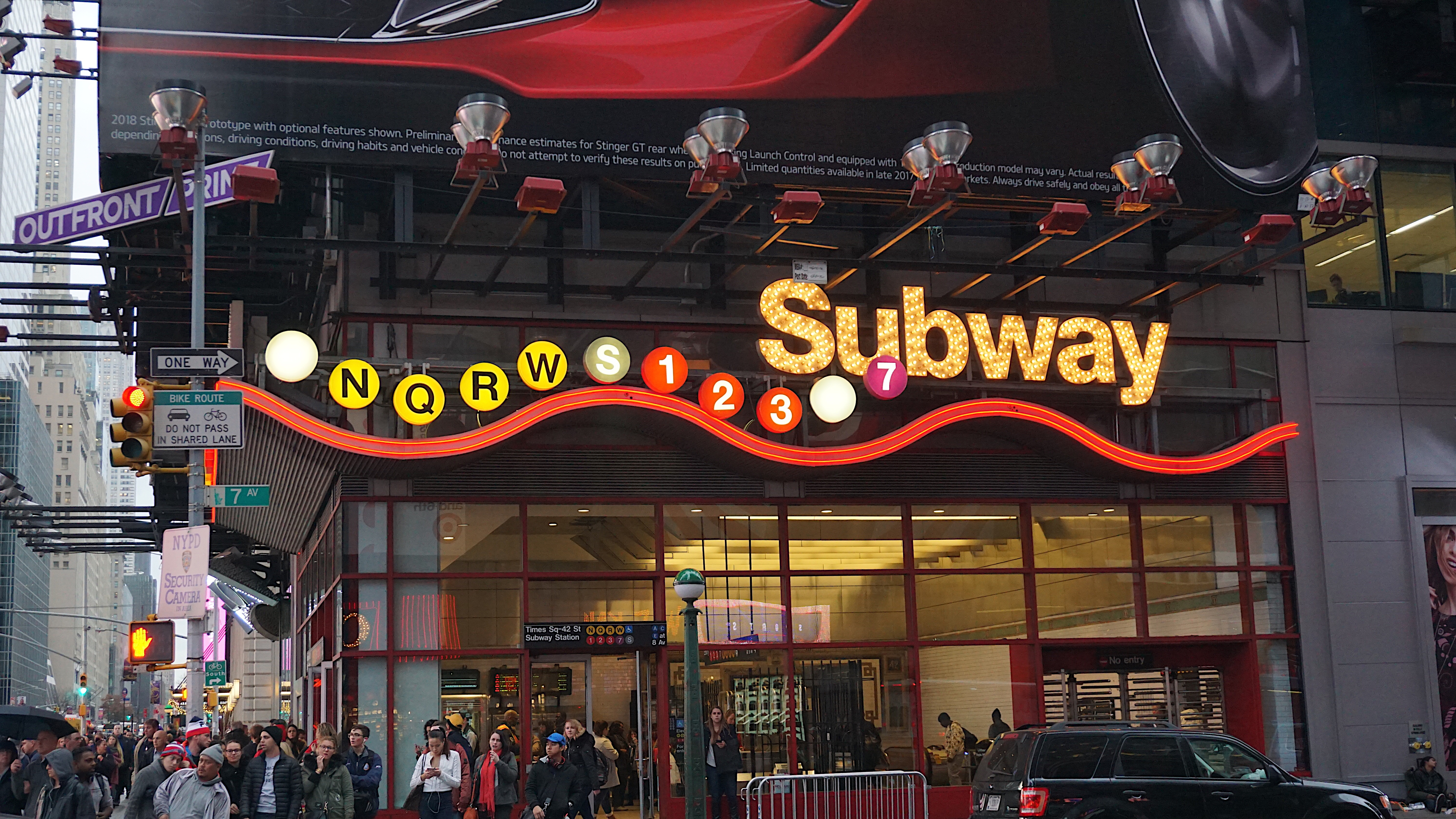
An entrance to the Times Square–42nd Street station

==== Turnstiles and entrance gates ====
The New York City Subway primarily employs two types of turnstiles: a waist-high turnstile, and a full-height turnstile known as a High Entry-Exit Turnstile (HEET). The waist-high turnstiles, the most prominent in the system, were installed beginning in 1993 along with the implementation of MetroCard, though they originally accepted tokens. They are manufactured in Tennessee by Cubic Corporation. Some of the waist-high turnstiles date to the late 20th century, when tokens were used to pay fares; as such, they still have token-return compartments. The waist-high turnstiles are vulnerable to a practice called "back-cocking", in which people entering the system can partially rotate the turnstile as if they were exiting, then slip through the side of the turnstile without paying.

The newer HEETs resemble several older turnstiles of that design informally called "iron maidens", and are prevalent at subway entrances without token booths to discourage fare evasion. Both turnstiles are stainless steel and are bidirectional, allowing passengers to enter with fare payment and to exit. A third older type of turnstile, the High Exit Turnstile (HET), is a black-painted unidirectional iron maiden and only turns in the exiting direction. Entrance is also available via Service Entry gates or AutoGates, which cater primarily to handicapped passengers or passengers with large items such as strollers and luggage. These gates double as pushbar Emergency Exits, though they are often used for regular exiting in crowded stations. As a precaution against fare evasion, two-fifths of the system's emergency exit doors had been retrofitted with delayed-opening devices as of 2025, and security guards were staffed outside emergency exits. The delayed-opening devices, which prevent the door from opening until several seconds after the door is pushed, can be overridden by MTA staff in emergencies.

New turnstile designs were introduced in the 2020s. The MTA announced in 2021 that it would install wide-aisle fare gates for disabled passengers at five subway stations by mid-2022; the implementation of these fare gates was delayed by a year. Additionally, in an attempt to reduce fare evasion, the MTA exhibited several designs for half-height and full-height Plexiglas turnstiles in May 2023, which would replace the existing waist-high turnstiles. On December 4, 2023, the first wide aisle fare gates were installed at Sutphin Boulevard–Archer Avenue–JFK Airport station. Within two months, there was a slight increase in fare-paying riders at the station, although passengers were able to evade fares merely by leaning over the new turnstiles and activating the motion sensors. Following adjustments to the turnstiles, the MTA announced in May 2024 that the new turnstiles would be installed at fifteen stations by the end of that year, but the installation of the turnstiles was delayed. As of 2025, the MTA planned to install the new turnstiles at 150 stations in four years. By 2026, the newer Plexiglas turnstiles had reduced fare evasion by an average of 35% where they were installed.

The MTA has also tested out other features to prevent fare evasion. These have included low metal fins or "sleeves" on each arm of a turnstile, to dissuade potential fare evaders from squeezing through the gaps between the arms, as well as high spiked panels between separate turnstiles. In December 2025, the MTA announced that these features would be installed in almost every station.

==== Lamps ====
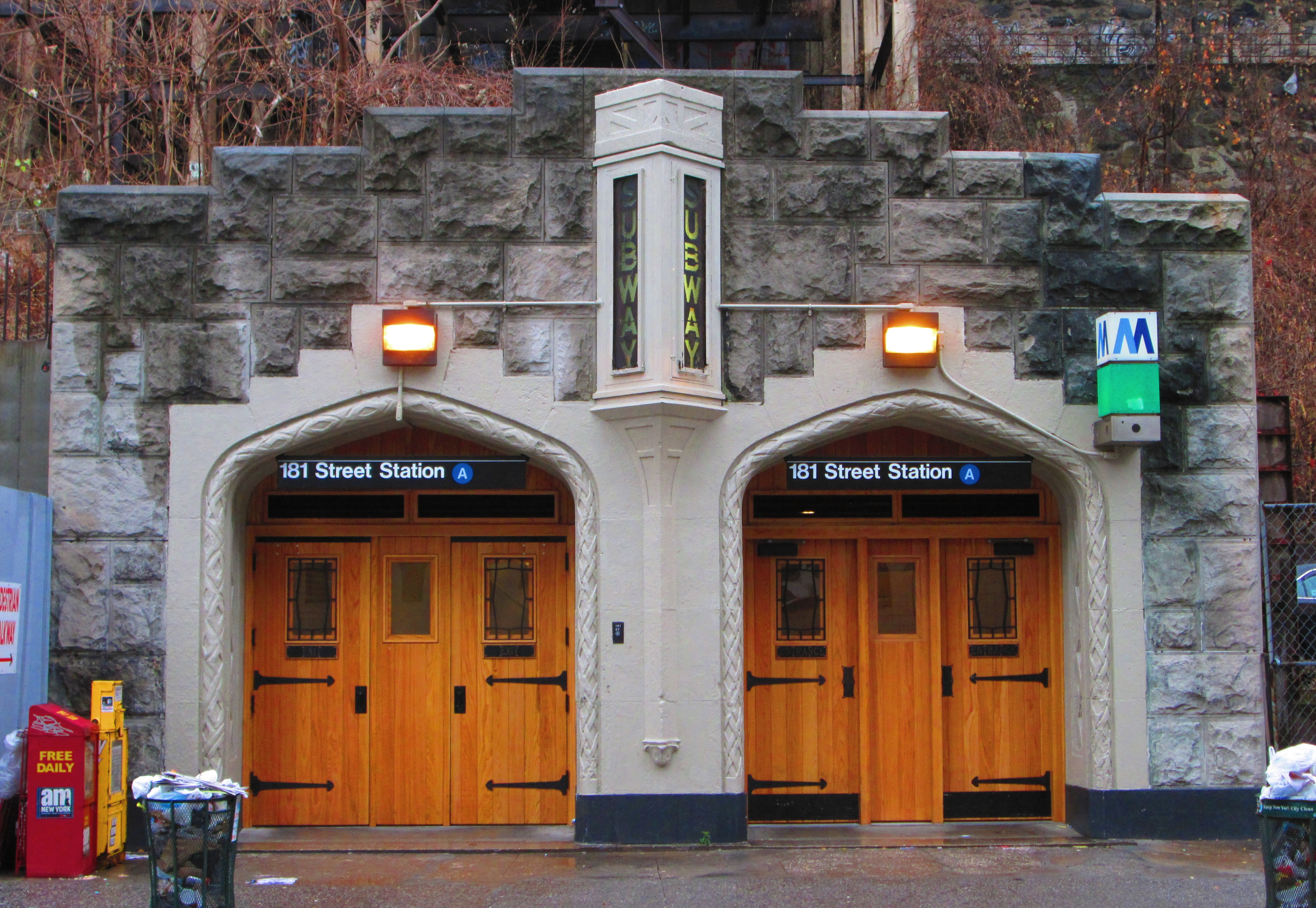
A 1980s-era square lamp at the 181st Street station. The green lamp is seen at right

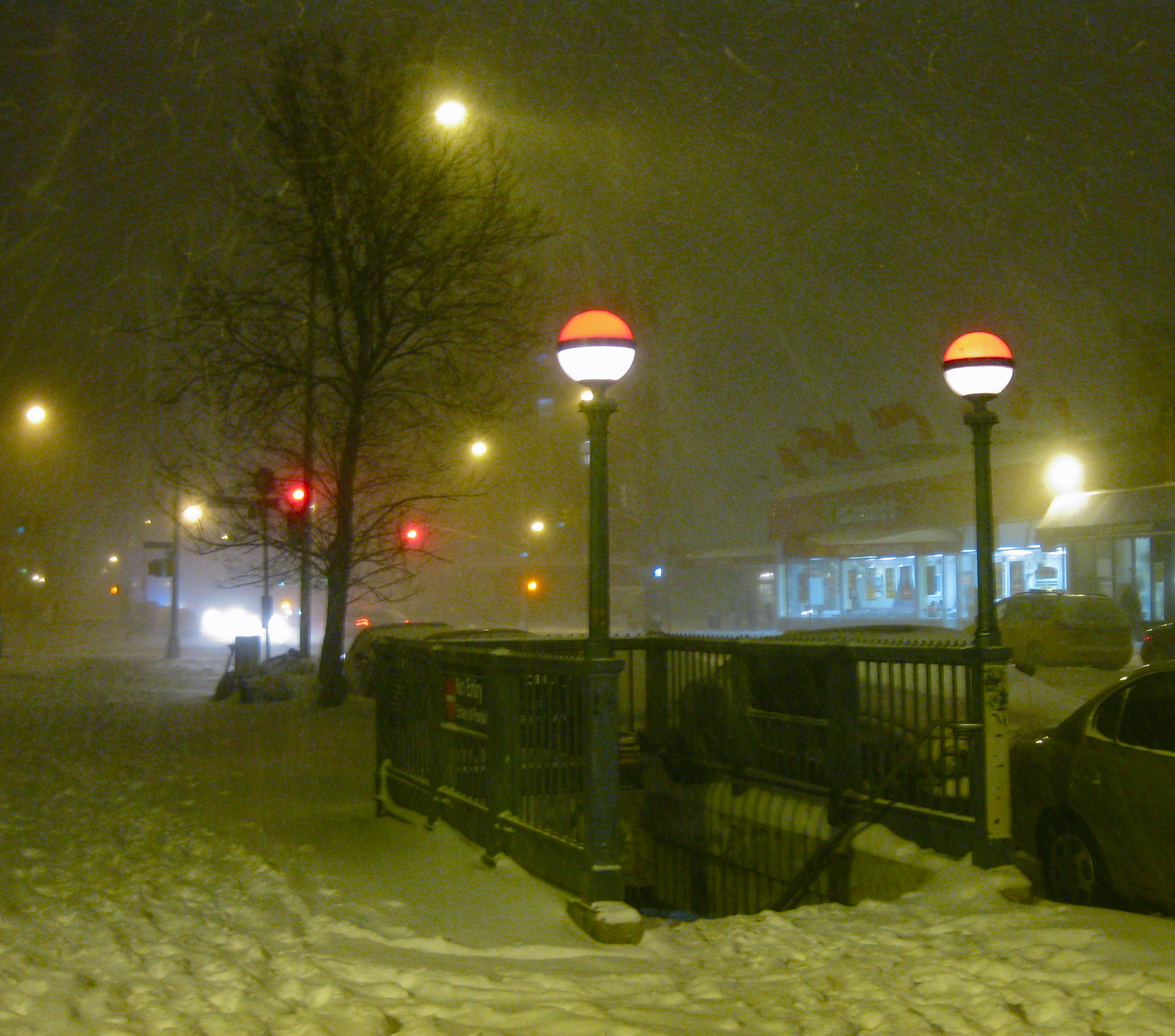
Exit from the Parkside Avenue station

At most of the system's entrances and exits, there is a lamppost or two bearing a colored spherical or cube-shaped lamp. These lights roughly indicate the station's availability (i.e. how often it is accessible): green means always a full-time, 24/7 entrance and the presence of a 24 hour booth, typically located at the busiest entrance. Red means either a part-time booth or no booth, hence either exit-only or more and more often 24/7 entrance with MetroCard exclusively via HEETs. Older lamps are completely colored green or red. Newer ones, called "half-moons", have only the top half colored, while the bottom half is milky white; this is to provide more light. The half-colored globes have the same meanings as the globes with full colors. There are also some square lamps.

The meaning of the lights is poorly understood by passengers and was originally more complicated. Green, yellow, and red lights were introduced in 1982 to indicate the entrance's availability, mostly to prevent muggings by warning riders away from entrances that were closed at night. Originally, green signified an entrance located at a full-time station booth, which was open 24/7 and had regular waist-high turnstiles. Yellow signified a part-time booth, to which access to the platforms could be gained using High Entry-Exit Turnstiles (HEETs). Red signified an exit-only. This proved too complicated and yellow was dropped in the early 1990s. Red globes now indicate both part-time entrance or exit-only. A joke when the system was introduced was that "green meant go in, red meant don't. And yellow meant to take a cab." (NYC medallion taxis are yellow).

With the introduction of the MetroCard in 1994, the MTA converted many previous exit-only entrances to full-time entrances via HEETs. The introduction of half-colored globes further confused riders of the subway system, and as of a 2002 survey, the globe lamps are poorly understood. (Note: According to a 2002 New York Times article: "Junior Torres, smoking a cigarette yesterday near an entrance to the A-line on Eighth Avenue and 15th Street, said confidently that he knew exactly what all the globes meant: green means always open, red means always closed, half-green means open most of the time and half-red means closed most of the time. 'That's what they mean,' Mr. Torres said. "Two transit workers near a 14th Street entrance allowed that they had never known just what the colors meant. And Toribio Nunez, coming out of the entrance, said he had always assumed that they were purely decorative, like lights on a Christmas tree. 'I've never looked at them, to tell you the truth,' he said. "Linda Vaccari and Laura Cugini, tourists from Bologna, Italy, said they were pretty sure that the colors showed the colors of the train lines below, though this often did not work.")

=== Concourse ===
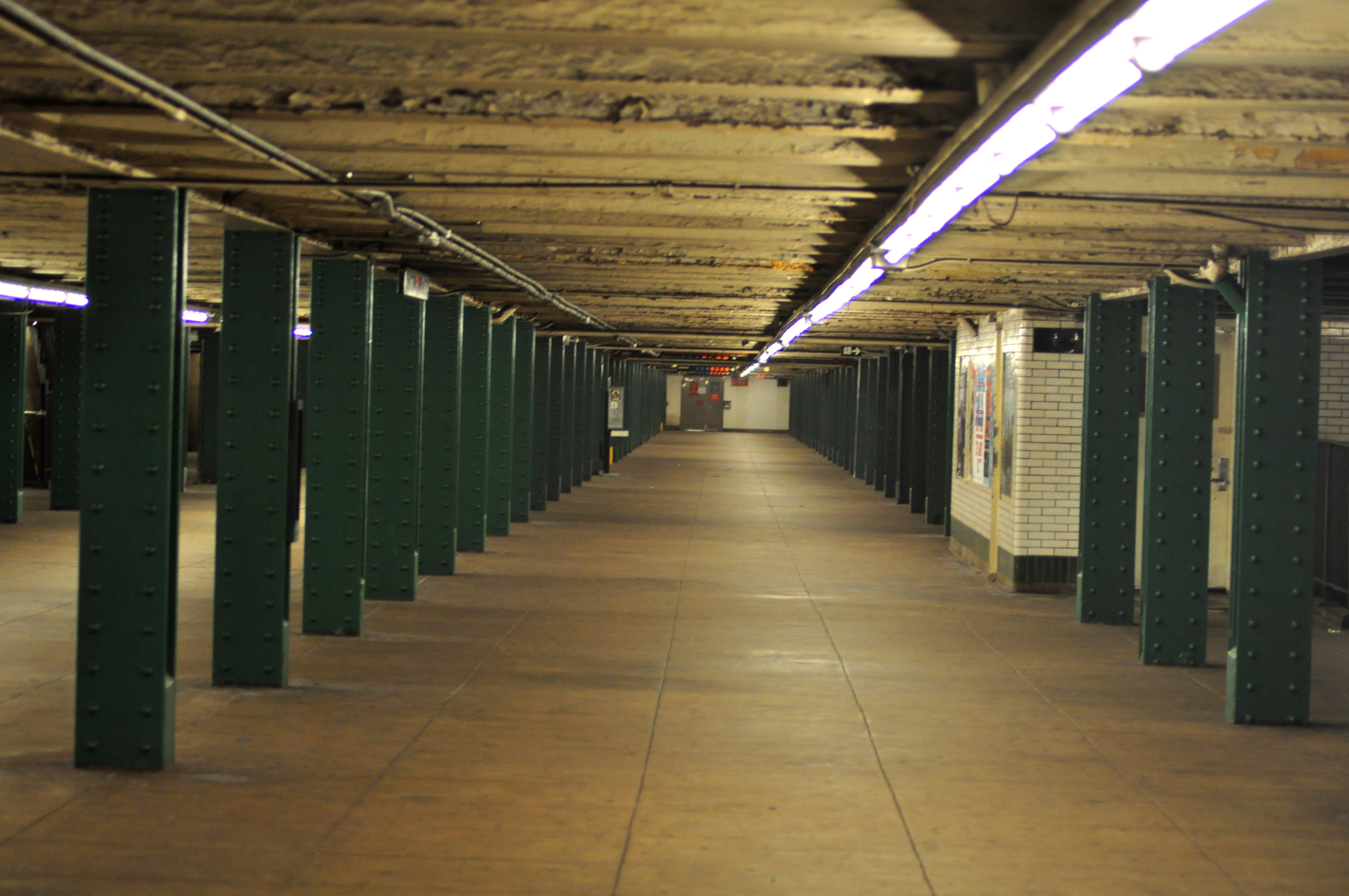
The long and wide mezzanine in the West Fourth Street–Washington Square station in Greenwich Village.

Many stations in the subway system have mezzanines. In underground stations, this typically consists of the first level below the street or the areas between the street and platform level. For open-cut, grade-level and elevated stations, prevalent in uptown Manhattan and the outer boroughs, the mezzanine area often consists of a station house at street level or above the street. Mezzanines allow for passengers to enter from multiple locations at an intersection and proceed to the correct platform without having to cross the street before entering. At busy intersections, they act as a pedestrian underpass or overpass.

They also allow for crossover between uptown and downtown trains on side platforms or a pair of island platforms, which is very useful when local tracks are closed for construction. Within the mezzanines are fare control areas, where passengers physically pay their fare to enter the subway system. In underground subway stations built close to ground level or under narrow streets, a characteristic of early IRT and BMT construction, the fare control area is at platform level with no mezzanine crossovers. Many elevated stations also have platform-level fare control with no common station house between directions of service.

Upon entering a station, passengers may use station booths, formerly known as token booths, or vending machines to buy their fare, which is stored in a MetroCard. Each station has at least one booth open 24/7, typically located at the busiest entrance. After swiping the card at a turnstile, customers enter the fare-controlled area of the station and continue to the platforms. Inside fare control are "Off-Hours Waiting Areas", which consist of benches and are identified by a yellow sign.

For various reasons, including maintenance costs, decreases in ridership, along with crime and safety issues, many stations have fare control areas, mezzanine areas and entrances that have been closed. Many mezzanines that previously stretched the entire length of a station have been split or partitioned by fencing or permanent walls. These closed areas have been abandoned or converted into space for Transit Operations or the New York City Police Department.

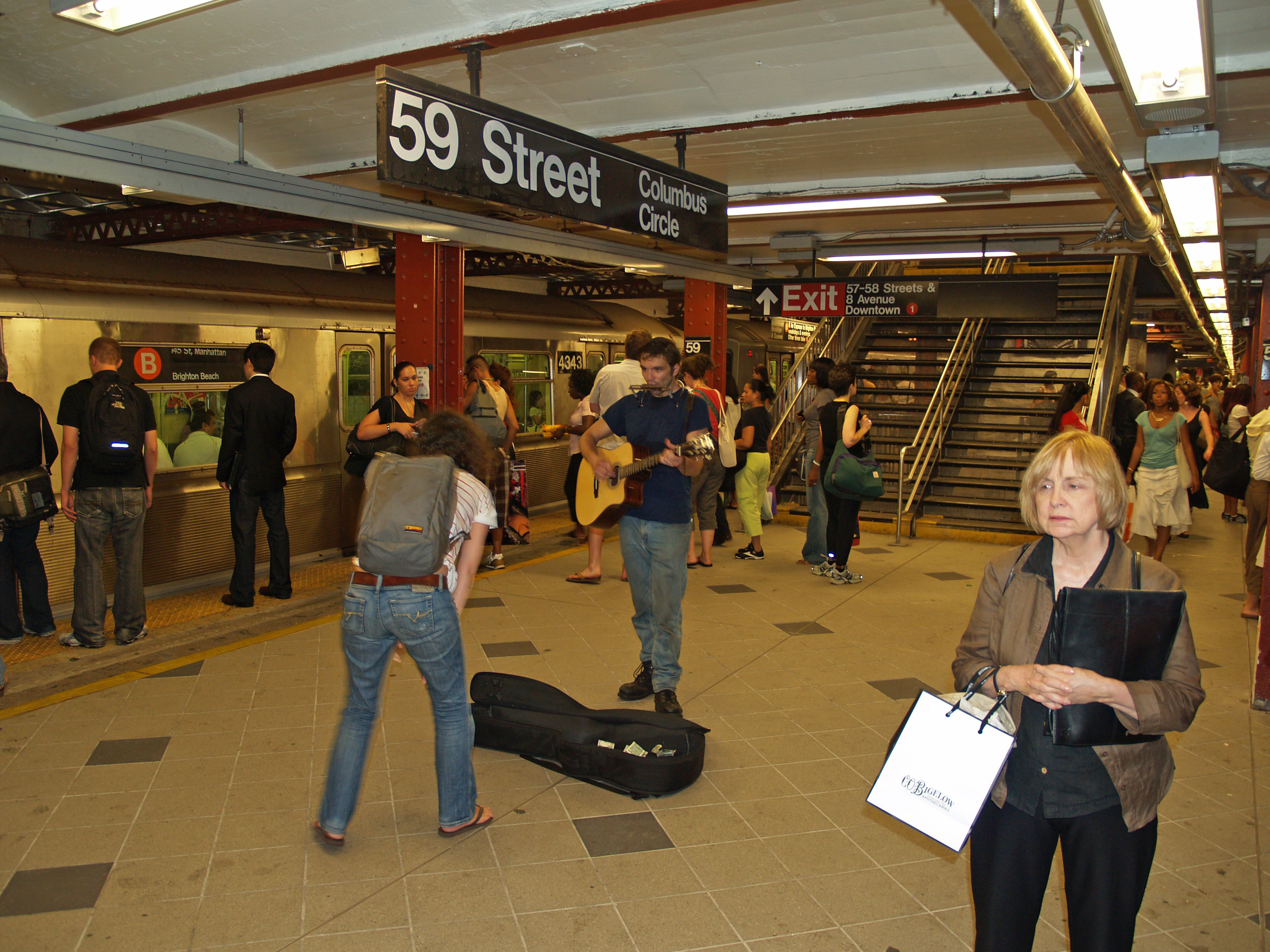
The IND Eighth Avenue Line station at 59th Street–Columbus Circle

=== Facilities and amenities ===
==== Air conditioning ====
In August 2006, the MTA announced that all future subway stations, which include 34th Street–Hudson Yards, South Ferry, and all Second Avenue Subway stations, will have platforms outfitted with air-cooling systems. The existing Grand Central–42nd Street station also has these cooling systems; however, for the most part, subway stations lack air-cooling systems due to their expense, and only a few stations have ceiling fans.

==== Artwork ====
Many stations are decorated with intricate ceramic tile work, some of it dating back to 1904 when the subway first opened. The subway tile artwork tradition continues in a Percent for Art program.

The MTA Arts & Design program oversees art in the subway system. Permanent installations, such as sculpture, mosaics, and murals; photographs displayed in lightboxes encourage people to use mass transit. In addition, commissioned art displayed in stations and "art cards", some displaying poetry, are in many of the trains themselves in unused advertisement fixture slots. Some of the art is by internationally known artists such as Elizabeth Murray's Blooming, displayed at Lexington Avenue/59th Street station.

==== Accessibility ====
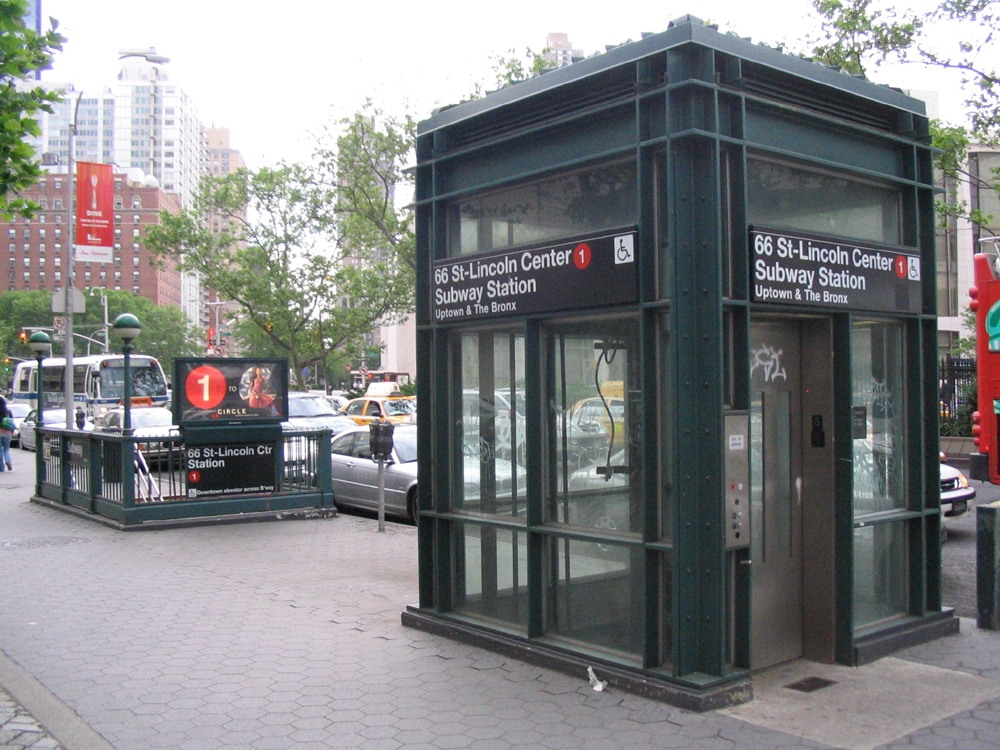
A street elevator serving as an entrance to the 66th Street–Lincoln Center station

Since the majority of the system was built before 1990, the year the Americans with Disabilities Act (ADA) went into effect, many New York City Subway stations were not designed to be handicapped-accessible. Since then, elevators have been built in newly constructed stations to comply with the ADA. Most grade-level stations required little modification to meet ADA standards. The MTA identified "key stations", high-traffic and/or geographically important stations, which must conform to the ADA when they are extensively renovated. As of June 2026, out of 472 total stations in the system, 163 are accessible; (Note: This includes station complexes but excludes some non-accessible platforms at such complexes.) many of them have AutoGate access.

Five stations on the Staten Island Railway are accessible. There are 16 more non-ADA-accessible stations with cross-platform interchanges, as well as other same-platform transfers, available, though the MTA notes that the gaps between train cars and platforms at these stations may nonetheless exceed the maximums established by the ADA.

==== Escalators ====
The subway station had 284 escalators as of 2019, including 232 operated by the New York City Transit Authority and 42 operated by property owners. Some stations have multiple escalators.

==== Entertainment ====
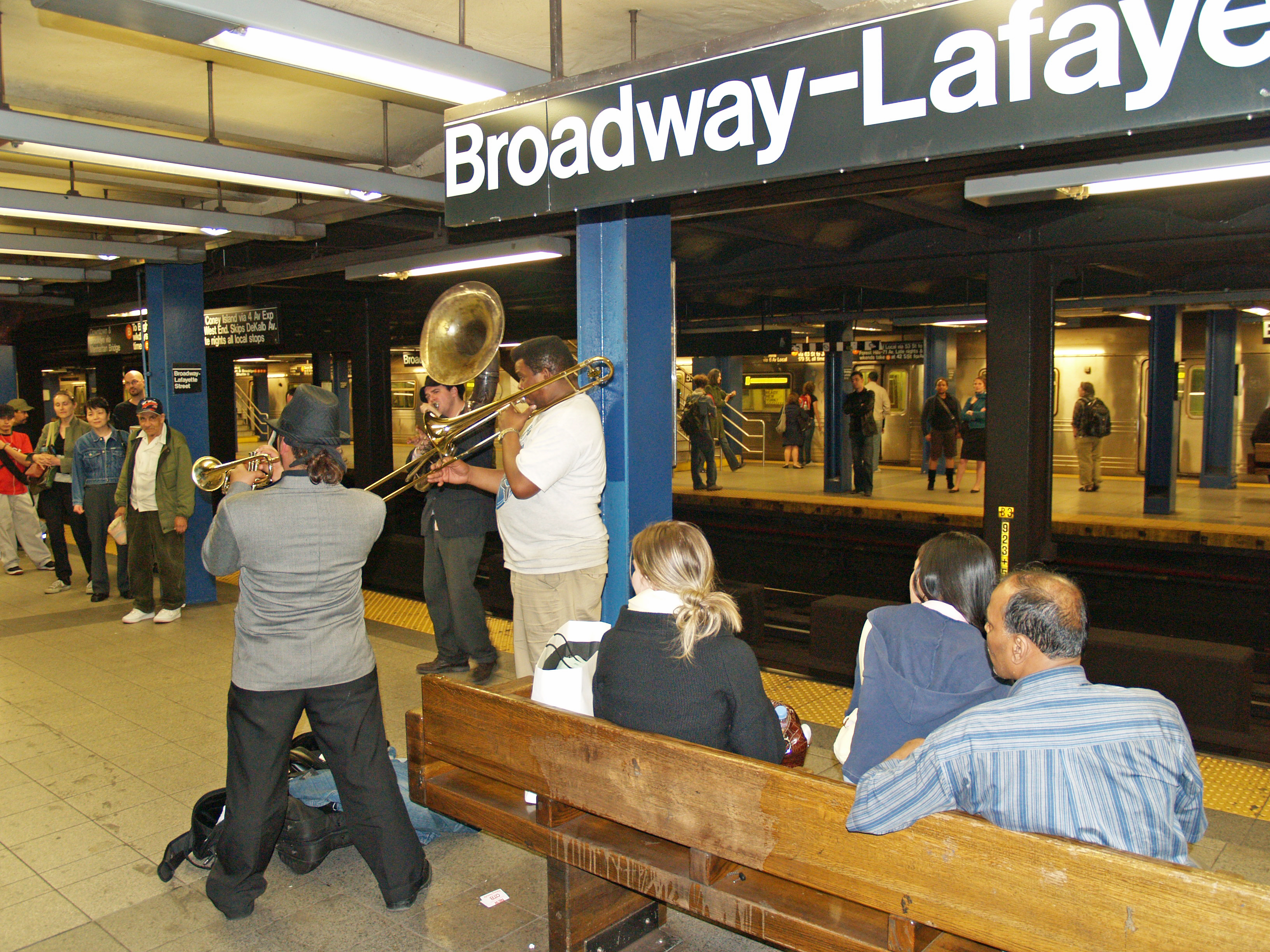
A typical scene of musicians performing on the platform of the Broadway–Lafayette Street station.

While a permit is not required for performances in the subway, certain codes of conduct are required. Any musician/entertainer may perform in subway mezzanines and platforms. On platforms, there may be no amplifications as this is part of MTA policies:

The New York City Transit (NYCT) [...] authorizes these types of free expression in subway stations: "Public speaking; distribution of written materials; solicitation for charitable, religious or political causes; and artist performances, including the acceptance of donations."

Performers must not be within 25 feet (7.6 m) of a token booth or 50 feet (15 m) from an MTA office/tower, blocking access to an escalator, stairwell, or elevator, interfering with transit services or passenger movement; or in an area where construction is occurring. In addition, performance is prohibited during public service announcements and may be no louder than 85 dBA at 5 feet (1.5 m) away or 70 dBa at 2 feet (0.61 m) from a token booth. Performances are prohibited in subway cars.

Since 1987, MTA has sponsored the "Music Under New York" (MUNY) program in which street musicians enter a competitive contest to be assigned to the preferred high traffic locations. Each year, applications are reviewed and approximately 70 eligible performers are selected and contacted to participate in live auditions held for one day. At present, more than 100 soloists and groups participate in MUNY providing over 150 weekly performances at 25 locations throughout the transit system, for example Natalia Paruz, a musical saw player, plays at Union Square.

==== Restrooms ====
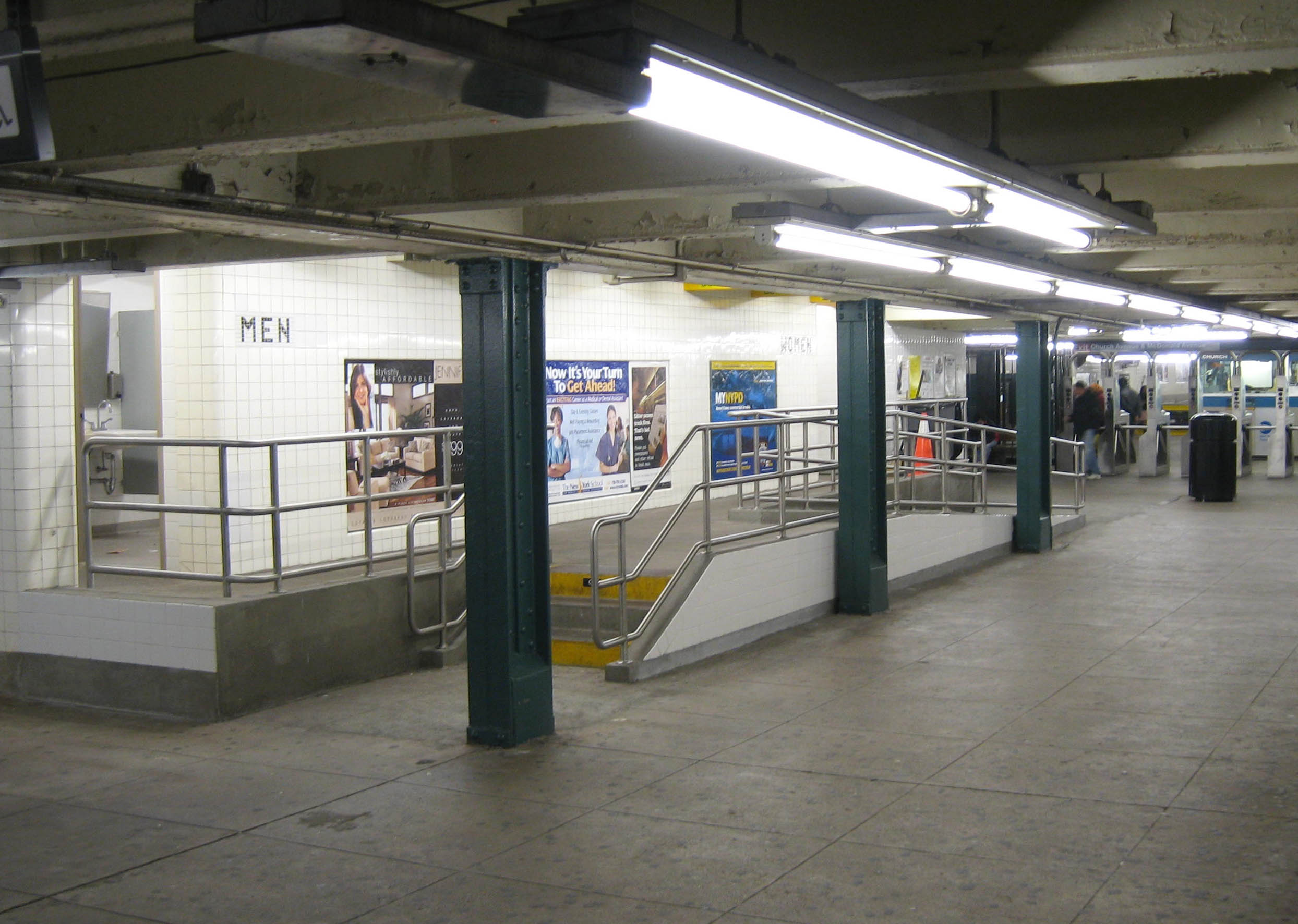
Restrooms at Church Avenue

Restrooms are rare in the subway system. In 2010, there were 133 open restrooms in 81 of the system's 468 stations. Most station restrooms previously open to the public have been closed and converted to storage spaces or employee use. There are a few major stations that have operating restrooms, including on the concourses of 42nd Street–Port Authority Bus Terminal, Chambers Street, 57th Street–Seventh Avenue, Coney Island–Stillwell Avenue, and Lexington Avenue/59th Street. The majority of restrooms in the New York City Subway are found in express and transfer stations, at ADA-accessible stations, and at terminals, though not all of the aforementioned types of stations have restrooms. Newer subway stations have restrooms, including 34th Street–Hudson Yards on the IRT Flushing Line and three Second Avenue Subway stations.

In the 2010s, the MTA planned to "overhaul" and reopen previously-closed restrooms. All of the system's restrooms were closed in 2020 due to the COVID-19 pandemic in New York City. These restrooms remained closed in 2022, despite a drastic increase in the number of "soiled train" incidents, where human waste was found on trains. The MTA reopened restrooms at eight stations in January 2023. At the time, there were restrooms in 69 of the system's 472 stations, and there were 163 total restrooms across the system. As of 2024, there were 58 open bathrooms throughout the system.

==== Retail ====
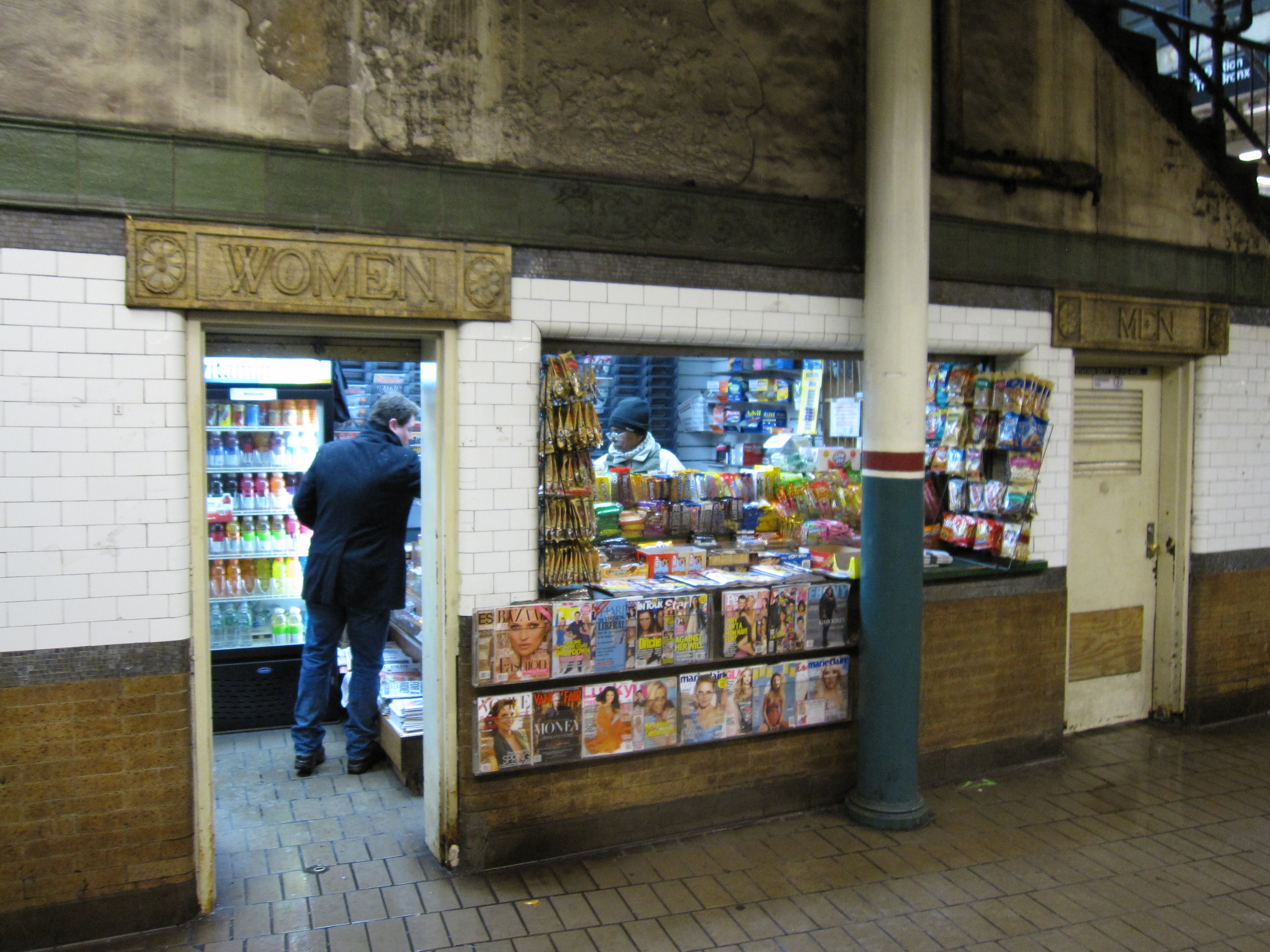
A former women's restroom converted into a newsstand at Astor Place

Some platforms have newspaper stands that sell various items including newspapers and food. The MTA has installed retail spaces within paid areas in selected stations, including the station concourses of the Times Square–Port Authority complex, the 59th Street–Columbus Circle station, and the 47th–50th Streets–Rockefeller Center station.

In the 1980s, the MTA operated around 350 retail spaces in the subway system. During the 21st century, the MTA continued to make efforts in attracting more diverse retailers and vendors to set up shop in the subway system. As of 2017, there are 111 newsstands in the system, including 20 that are vacant. This includes three empty stands on the Second Avenue Subway that opened that year. Many of the system's stores closed during the COVID-19 pandemic in New York City. By 2024, only a little over one-quarter of storefronts (54 of 195 storefronts) still had tenants.

==== Lighting ====
The subway system originally used incandescent lights; the first incandescent bulbs were installed in 1904 as part of the first subway line. As many as 50 types of incandescent lights were once used in the subway. To discourage the theft of the lighting fixtures, the New York City Subway system used lightbulbs with reversed threads, which could not be screwed into residential lamps. Over the years, all incandescent bulbs in stations have been replaced with fluorescent lights. In 2024, the MTA announced that, as a safety measure, it would install 150,000 LED lights across the subway system by 2026. To discourage people from jumping onto the tracks, there are blue lights at several subway stations.

=== Connections ===
Rapid transit and rail connections are available at designated stations to Amtrak, Long Island Rail Road, AirTrain JFK, Metro-North Railroad, New Jersey Transit and PATH. Connections to the Staten Island Ferry and privately operated ferries such as NYC Ferry, NY Waterway and New York Water Taxi, as well as intercity and commuter bus lines at the Port Authority Bus Terminal and George Washington Bridge Bus Terminal, are also available. Free MetroCard-only transfers to buses are available to MTA New York City Transit buses (including the bus rapid transit Select Bus Service), MTA Bus Company, NICE buses (Nassau County) and Bee-Line buses (Westchester County).

=== Station management ===
In 2018, New York City Transit president Andy Byford implemented a "group station manager" program, where 24 people would be hired to oversee up to twenty-five stations. This replaced a previous system where station managers could be responsible for up to 100 stations. Group station managers were generally responsible for coordinating repairs and operations, as well as providing customer service in each of the stations under their purview. These group station managers repaired over 62,000 issues by early 2020.

== Station platforms and configurations ==
Out of the system's 472 stations, 283 are underground, (Note: This counts both the island and loop platforms of the South Ferry Broadway–Seventh Avenue Line station as one station, even though these are two stations by MTA standards.) 149 are elevated, 20 are in open cuts, 7 are at-grade, (Note: This includes the Wilson Avenue station, which is partially at-grade and partially elevated, but due to the surrounding topography, appears to be partially underground and partially at-grade, respectively. In addition, Harlem–148th Street is also at-grade, and Botanic Garden is in an open cut, though they seem to be underground.) and 13 are on embankments. (Note: This counts stations that are partially on overpasses, but are not completely elevated.)

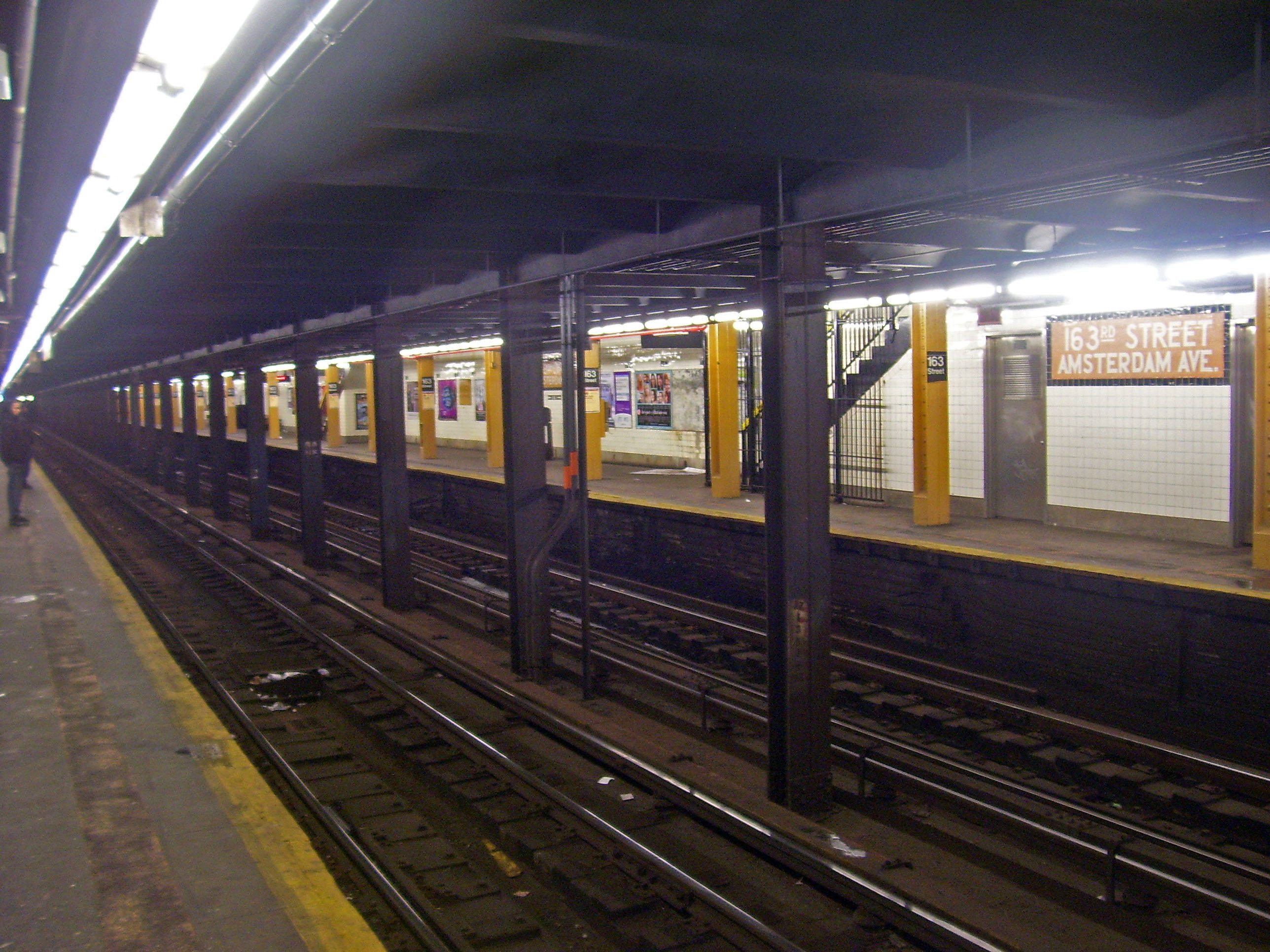
A typical underground station (163rd Street–Amsterdam Avenue)

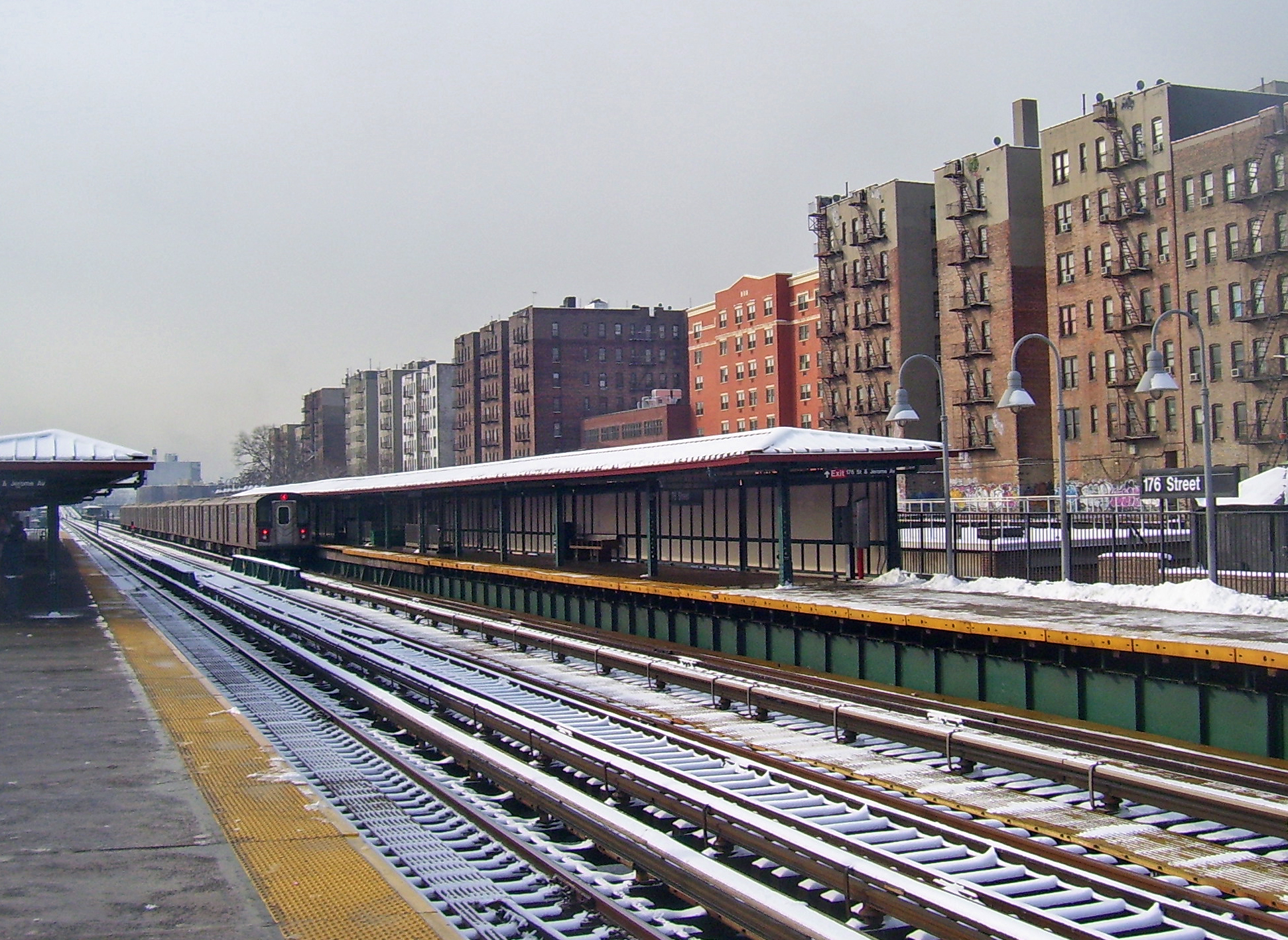
A typical elevated station (176th Street)

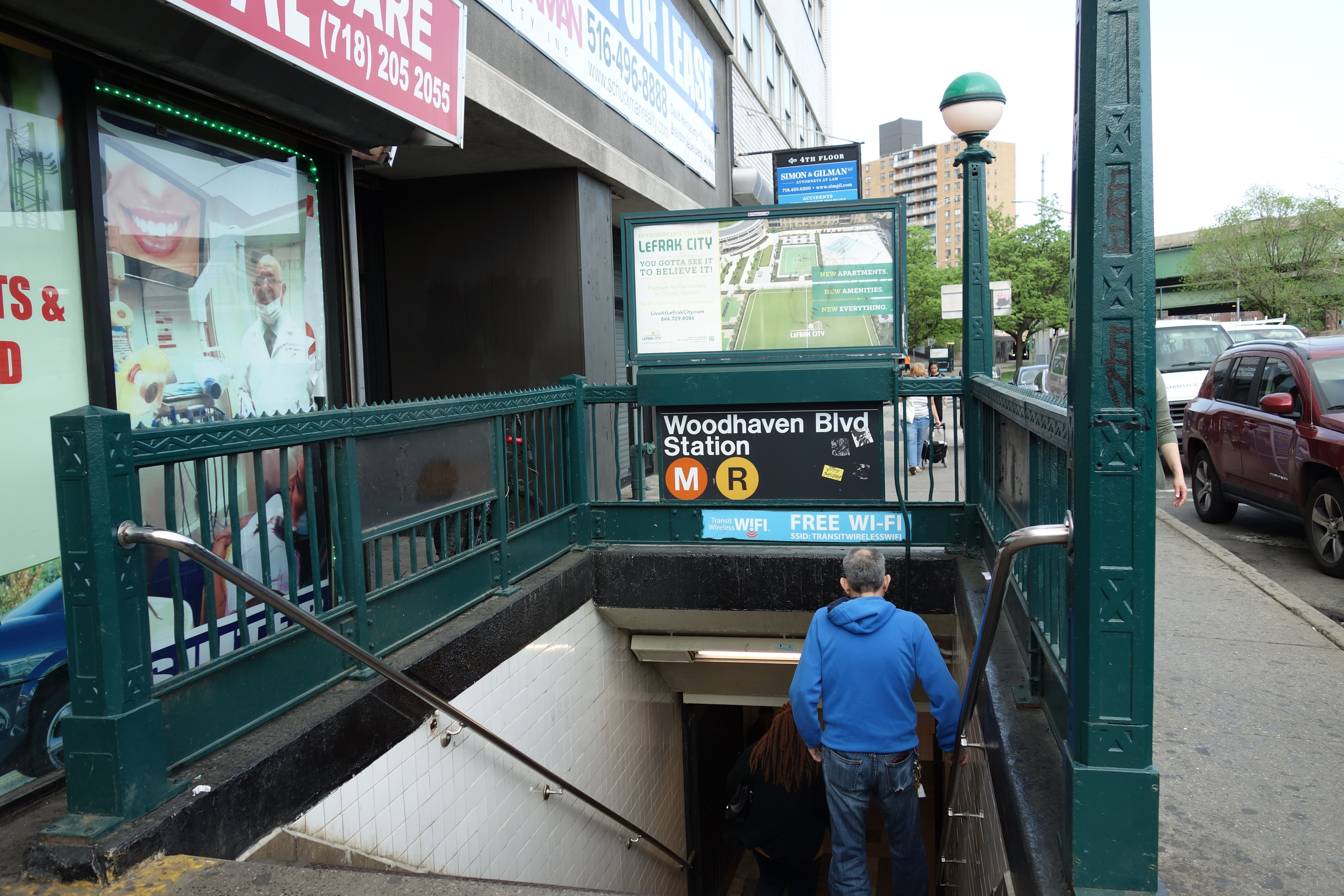
A typical entrance to an underground station (Woodhaven Boulevard)

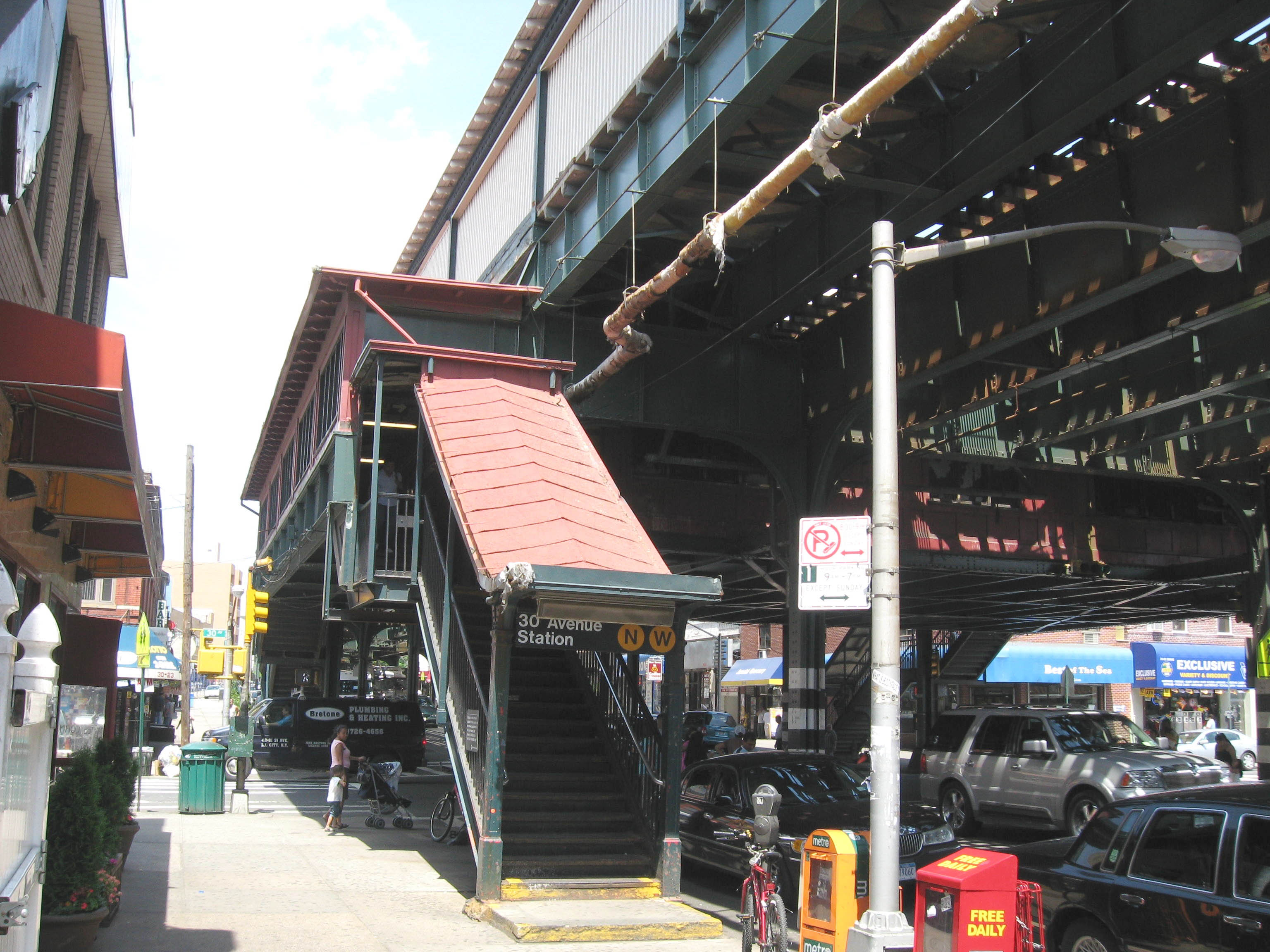
A typical entrance to an elevated station (30th Avenue)

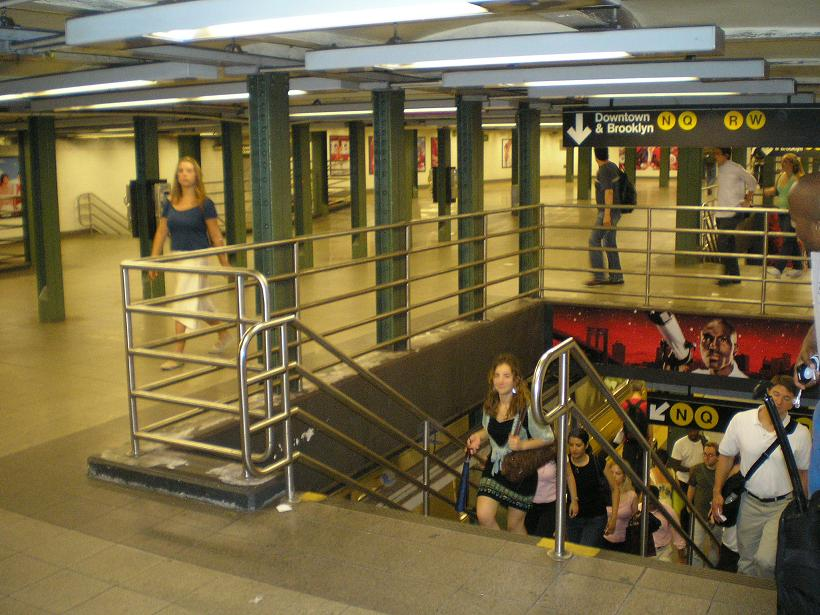
A typical underground station mezzanine (14th Street–Union Square)

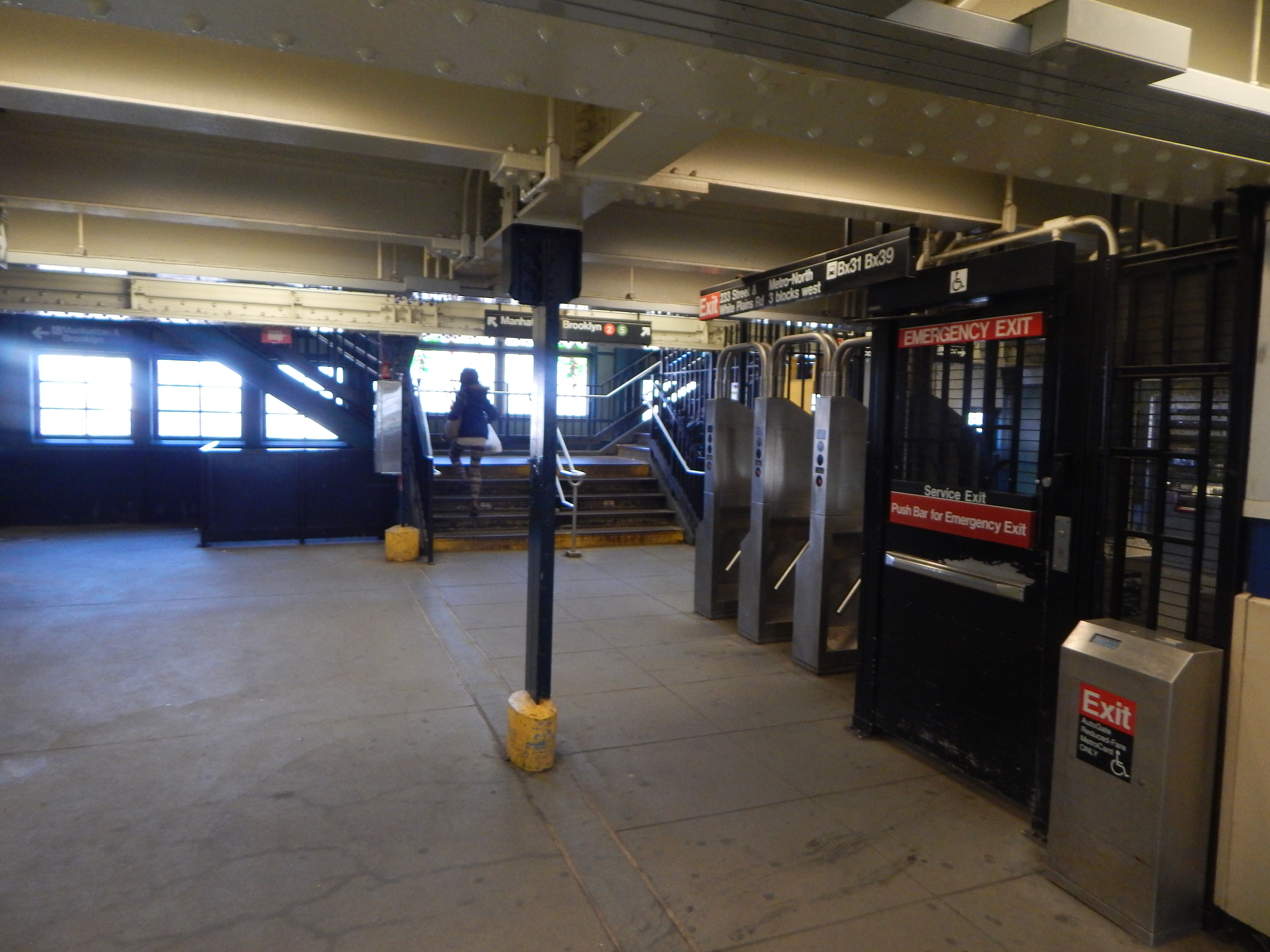
A typical elevated station mezzanine (233rd Street)

A typical subway station has waiting platforms ranging from 480 to 600 feet (150 to 180 m) long. Some IND platforms may be as long as 660 to 745 feet (201 to 227 m) long. Platforms of former commuter rail stations, such as those on the IND Rockaway Line, are even longer. Due to the large number of transit lines, one platform or set of platforms often serves more than one service, unlike other rapid transit systems including the Paris Metro, but like some lines on the London Underground. A passenger needs to look at the signs hung at the platform entrance steps and over each track to see which trains stop there and when, and at the arriving train to see which train it is.

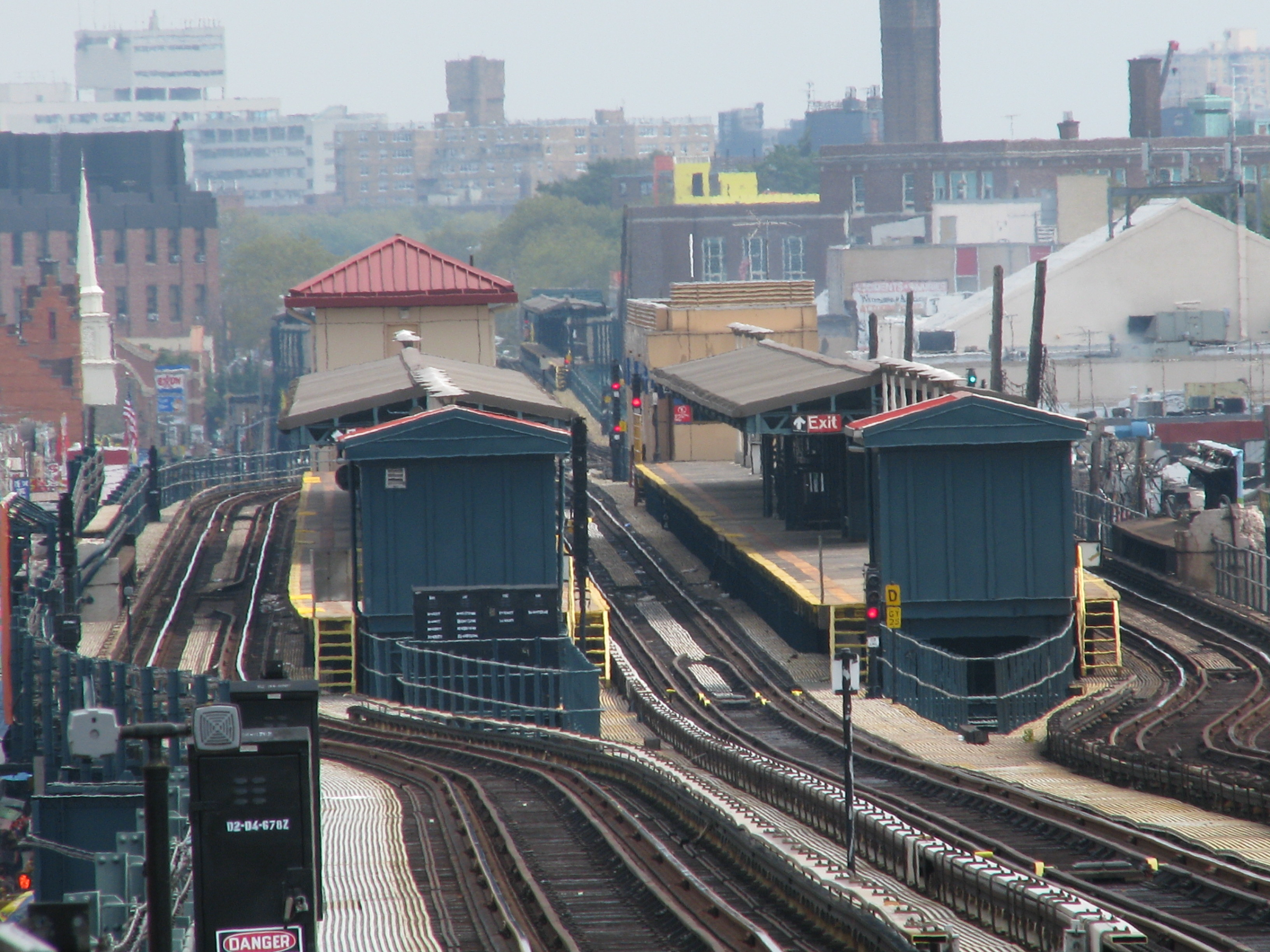
The Bay Parkway station on the West End Line. The track in the middle is a bi-directional express track

Almost everywhere express trains run, they run on the inner one (of 3) or two (of 4) tracks. Local trains run on the outer two tracks. In a 3-track configuration, the center track can be used toward the center of the city in the morning and away from the center in the evening, though not every 3-track line has that express service.

There are several common platform configurations:

- On a 2-track line, a station may have one center island platform used for trains in both directions, or 2 side platforms, one for a train in each direction.
- For a 3-track or 4-track line, local stops will have side platforms. The middle one or two tracks will not stop at the station.
- For most 3- or 4-track express stops, there will be two island platforms, one for the local and express in one direction, and another for the local and express in the other direction. Each island platform provides a cross-platform interchange between the local and express services.

In a few cases, a 4-track station has an island platform for the center express tracks and two side platforms for the outside local tracks. This occurs only at three stations near major railway stations where the next station along the line is also an express station with the more common platform configuration. The purpose of splitting the platforms is to limit overcrowding by preventing cross-platform interchanges between local and express services. The oldest station to be built with this layout is the Atlantic Avenue–Barclays Center station on the IRT Eastern Parkway Line (2, 3, 4, and 5 trains), where the connection is to the Atlantic Terminal of the Long Island Rail Road, with an adjacent express station at Nevins Street.

The layout also exists at 34th Street–Penn Station on both the IRT Broadway–Seventh Avenue Line (1, 2, and 3 trains) and IND Eighth Avenue Line (A, C, and E trains), with adjacent express stations at Times Square–42nd Street and 42nd Street–Port Authority Bus Terminal, where the connection is to Pennsylvania Station, one of the two major New York City railway stations. This does not occur with the connection to New York's other major station, Grand Central Terminal, at Grand Central on the IRT Lexington Avenue Line (4, 5, 6, and <6> trains), which has no adjacent express station.

There is one notable 6-track local station, DeKalb Avenue on the BMT Fourth Avenue Line. Trains to or from the Manhattan Bridge either stop at the outer tracks of the island platforms (B and Q trains) or pass through and bypass the station on the middle tracks ("bypass express tracks") (D and N trains). Trains to or from the Montague Street Tunnel (R and W trains) stop across the platform from the respective outer track.

=== Stations with two levels ===
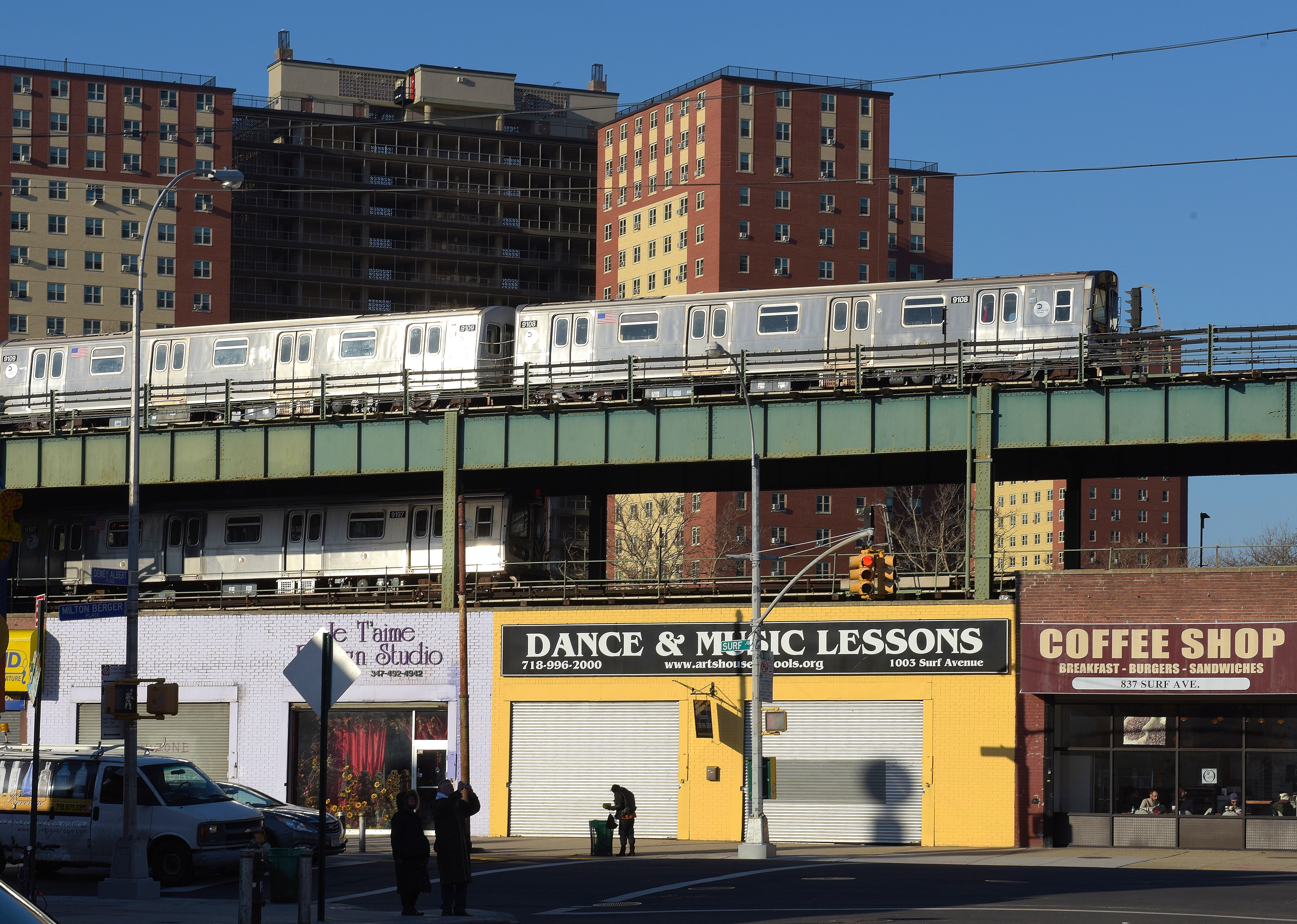
Two levels of tracks near the West Eighth Street–New York Aquarium station

Some stations have two levels. The levels separate the platforms of different services and/or directions. For example:

- the local trains on one level and the express trains on another level
- trains of two different lines on two different levels
- trains of two different directions on two different levels, with a cross-platform interchange on each level
- trains of different services on two different levels that are on the same line

== List of stations ==
In addition to the main list detailing ridership and daytime services, the complete list of stations is also split by borough. The second column displays the number of stations as counted by the Metropolitan Transportation Authority. The third column shows the number of stations when "station complexes" are considered to be one station each.

Lists	Number of stations	Number of stations	Station complexes	Services
Total	472	423	32	"1" train "2" train "3" train "4" train "5" train "6" train "6" express train "7" train "7" express train "A" train "B" train "C" train "D" train "E" train "F" train "G" train "J" train "L" train "M" train "N" train "Q" train "R" train shuttle train "W" train "Z" train
The Bronx	70	68	2	"1" train "2" train "4" train "5" train "6" train "6" express train "B" train "D" train
Brooklyn	170	157	10	(Franklin Avenue)
Manhattan	151	121	18	(42nd Street)
Queens	81	78	2	(Rockaway Park)

== Station complexes ==
The New York City Subway has several types of transfer stations, among them station complexes (i.e. sets of two or more stations connected with a passageway inside fare control) and stations serving two or more lines (considered to be one station each). The table below only lists the station complexes. For a more detailed list see the main article.

Name of station complex	Daytime Services	Borough
14th Street/Sixth Avenue	"1" train "2" train "3" train "F" train "F" express train "L" train "M" train	Manhattan
14th Street/Eighth Avenue	"A" train "C" train "E" train "L" train	Manhattan
14th Street–Union Square	"4" train "5" train "6" train "6" express train "L" train "N" train "Q" train "R" train "W" train	Manhattan
34th Street–Herald Square	"B" train "D" train "F" train "F" express train "M" train "N" train "Q" train "R" train "W" train	Manhattan
42nd Street–Bryant Park/Fifth Avenue	"7" train "7" express train "B" train "D" train "F" train "F" express train "M" train	Manhattan
59th Street–Columbus Circle	"1" train "A" train "B" train "C" train "D" train	Manhattan
149th Street–Hostos	"2" train "4" train "5" train	the Bronx
161st Street–Yankee Stadium	"4" train "B" train "D" train	the Bronx
168th Street	"1" train "A" train "C" train	Manhattan
Atlantic Avenue–Barclays Center	"2" train "3" train "4" train "5" train "B" train "D" train "N" train "Q" train "R" train "W" train	Brooklyn
Borough Hall/Court Street	"2" train "3" train "4" train "5" train "R" train	Brooklyn
Broadway–Lafayette Street/Bleecker Street	"6" train "6" express train "B" train "D" train "F" train "F" express train "M" train	Manhattan
Broadway Junction	"A" train "C" train "J" train "L" train "Z" train	Brooklyn
Brooklyn Bridge–City Hall/Chambers Street	"4" train "5" train "6" train "6" express train "J" train "Z" train	Manhattan
Canal Street	"6" train "6" express train "J" train "N" train "Q" train "R" train "W" train "Z" train	Manhattan
Chambers Street–World Trade Center/Park Place/Cortlandt Street	"2" train "3" train "A" train "C" train "E" train "R" train "W" train	Manhattan
Court Square–23rd Street	"7" train "7" express train "E" train "F" train "F" express train "G" train	Queens
Delancey Street/Essex Street	"F" train "F" express train "J" train "M" train "Z" train	Manhattan
Fourth Avenue/Ninth Street	"F" train "G" train "R" train	Brooklyn
Franklin Avenue/Botanic Garden	"2" train "3" train "4" train "5" train Franklin Avenue Shuttle	Brooklyn
Franklin Avenue	"C" train Franklin Avenue Shuttle	Brooklyn
Fulton Street	"2" train "3" train "4" train "5" train "A" train "C" train "J" train "Z" train	Manhattan
Grand Central–42nd Street	"4" train "5" train "6" train "6" express train "7" train "7" express train 42nd Street Shuttle	Manhattan
Jay Street–MetroTech	"A" train "C" train "F" train "F" express train "R" train	Brooklyn
Lexington Avenue/51st Street	"6" train "6" express train "E" train "F" train "F" express train	Manhattan
Lexington Avenue/59th Street	"4" train "5" train "6" train "6" express train "N" train "R" train "W" train	Manhattan
Metropolitan Avenue/Lorimer Street	"G" train "L" train	Brooklyn
Myrtle–Wyckoff Avenues	"L" train "M" train	Brooklyn
62nd Street/New Utrecht Avenue	"D" train "N" train	Brooklyn
Jackson Heights–Roosevelt Avenue/74th Street	"7" train "7" express train "E" train "F" train "F" express train "M" train "R" train	Queens
South Ferry/Whitehall Street	"1" train "R" train "W" train	Manhattan
Times Square–42nd Street Port Authority Bus Terminal	"1" train "2" train "3" train "7" train "7" express train "A" train "C" train "E" train "N" train "Q" train "R" train "W" train 42nd Street Shuttle	Manhattan

== See also ==
- List of New York City Subway stations
- List of New York City Subway transfer stations
- List of New York City Subway terminals
- List of closed New York City Subway stations
- List of Staten Island Railway stations
- Accessibility of the Metropolitan Transportation Authority
