= USS General John Pope =

United States Navy/Army troop transport

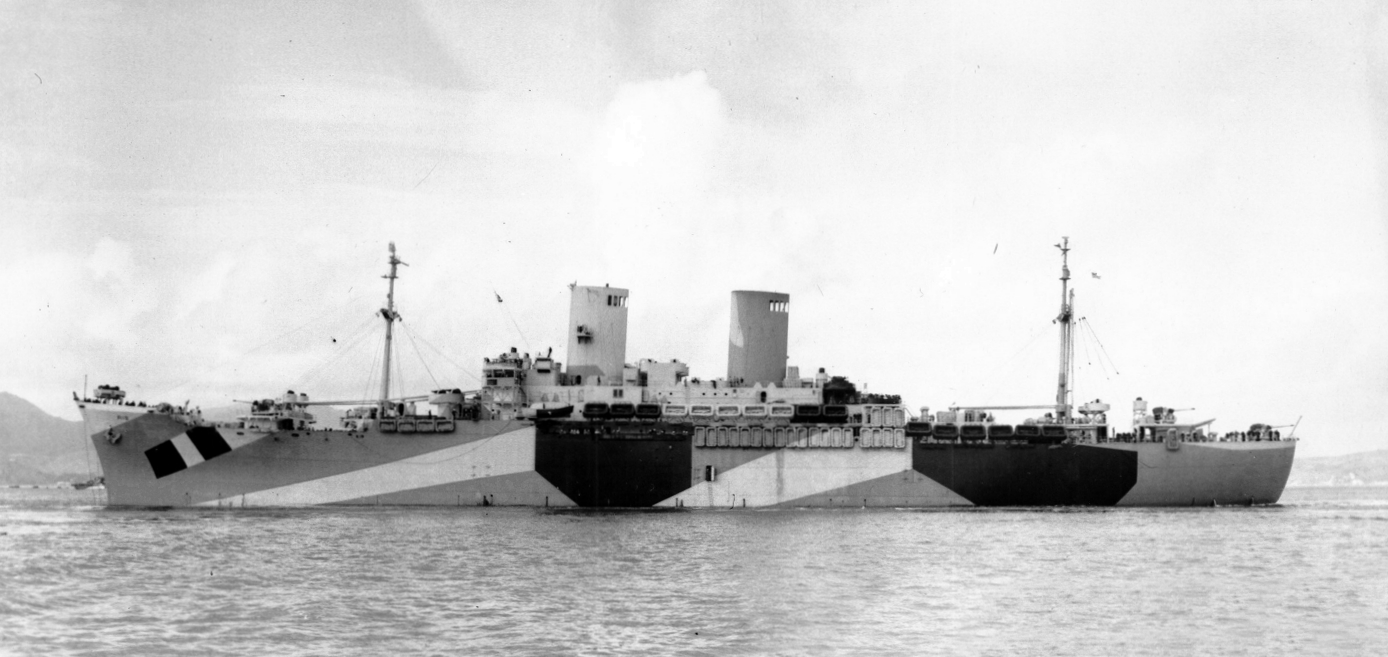

History

United States
- Name: USS General John Pope
- Namesake: John Pope, Union General in the American Civil War
- Builder: Federal Shipbuilding and Dry Dock Company, Kearny, New Jersey
- Laid down: 14 July 1942
- Launched: 21 March 1943
- Sponsored by: Mrs Charles P. Gross
- Acquired: 2 July 1943
- Commissioned: 5 August 1943
- Decommissioned: 12 June 1946
- In service: 20 Jul 1950 – 5 Sep 1958; 17 Aug 1965 – 1 May 1970
- Stricken: 12 June 1946 & 26 October 1990
- Reinstated: 20 July 1950
- Identification: MC hull type P2-S2-R2, MC hull no. 688; IMO number: 8332851
- Honors and awards: 11 medals, 8 service stars & 1 clasp
- Fate: Scrapped 2011

General characteristics
- Class & type: General John Pope-class transport
- Type: troopship
- Displacement: 11,450 tons (lt); 20,175 tons fully laden
- Length: 622 feet 7 inches (189.76 m)
- Beam: 75 feet 6 inches (23.01 m)
- Draft: 25 feet 6 inches (7.77 m)
- Installed power: 19,000 shp
- Propulsion: 2 steam turbines, reduction gearing, twin screw
- Speed: 21 knots (39 km/h)
- Troops: 5,142
- Complement: 465
- Armament: 4 x single 5"/38 caliber dual purpose guns, 4 x quad 1.1" guns, 20 x single 20mm cannon

USS General John Pope (AP-110) was a troop transport that served with the United States Navy in World War II. After the war she was transferred to the Army and redesignated USAT General John Pope. She later served in the Korean and Vietnam Wars as a civilian-crewed Military Sea Transportation Service vessel, as USNS General John Pope (T-AP-110).

General John Pope was launched under a Maritime Commission contract 21 March 1943 by the Federal Shipbuilding and Dry Dock Company of Kearny, New Jersey; acquired by the Navy 2 July 1943; placed in ferry commission the same day for transfer to Baltimore for conversion to a transport by Maryland Drydock Company, and commissioned in full 5 August 1943.

== World War II ==
After shakedown General John Pope sailed for Newport News 5 September 1943 with over 6,000 troops and civilians bound for Greenock, Scotland; and, after disembarking her passengers there, returned to Norfolk, Virginia 25 September. From 6 October to 19 November she made a troop-carrying voyage to Brisbane, Australia; and, after touching Townsville and Milne Bay, put in at San Francisco on the latter date. Underway again 10 December with over 5,000 troops for the Pacific fighting and 500 staff. General John Pope debarked them at Nouméa 23 December and returned via Pago Pago to San Francisco 10 January 1944 with 2,500 veterans.

In the months that followed, General John Pope sailed in support of the giant amphibious offensive on New Guinea's northern coast, spearheaded by Rear Admiral Barbey's famed VII Amphibious Force. On a 3-month round-trip voyage out of San Francisco, beginning 23 January, she took troops to Guadalcanal, Auckland, and Nouméa, and brought 1,300 men back to San Francisco 9 March. General John Pope then embarked another full complement of troops, including the 1st Filipino Infantry Regiment, and sailed 6 April for Nouméa and Oro Bay, New Guinea.

Returning via Nouméa to embark casualties, the ship reached San Francisco 18 May 1944. During the summer of 1944, the far-ranging transport made two round-trip voyages from San Francisco: on the first she got underway 27 May for New Guinean ports, Guadalcanal, and the Russell Islands, debarking 3,800 men of the famous 1st Marine Division at San Diego, California before returning to San Francisco; and on the second she departed 26 July for Honolulu and returned 8 August.

In the early fall, another voyage out of San Francisco 14 August brought General John Pope on a troop rotation run to New Guinean ports; and subsequently, after embarking 5,000 Army troops at San Pedro, California, she sailed via Melbourne for Bombay. Nearly 4,000 fighting men, mainly troops of the New Zealand Expeditionary Forces, were embarked and delivered safely to Melbourne and Wellington before the ship moored again at San Pedro 16 January 1945.

The spring of 1945 saw a round-trip troop-carrying voyage begin in San Francisco 26 March, which took her to Manila, Leyte, and Biak before returning 21 May. General John Pope next stood out from the Golden Gate once more 2 June 1945, this time bound for Marseille, where 5,242 troops were embarked and taken to Manila.

=== After Hostilities ===
The transport returned to Seattle 17 August following this long voyage, but she was underway again 11 days later via Ulithi, Cebu, and Leyte for Yokohama, returning to San Francisco 8 October with over 5,000 veterans.

From 19 October 1945 to 7 May 1946, four more Magic-Carpet and troop rotation voyages were made, two from San Francisco and two from Seattle, to the Philippines and Yokohama. Finally, missions accomplished, General John Pope departed San Francisco 15 May bound for New York, where she decommissioned 12 June 1946 and was returned to the War Shipping Administration (WSA). She was then transferred to the Army where she served as USAT General John Pope.

== Korean War ==
Reinstated on the Navy List 20 July 1950, General John Pope was assigned to MSTS 1 August. During the Korean War she carried American troops to Japan and Korea to take part in the giant effort to hold back the Communist invasion. Following the war, General John Pope continued to sail to Japanese and Korean ports on troop rotation duties, finally being placed in reduced operational status at Seattle 14 May 1955. The veteran transport was returned to the Maritime Administration (MARAD) and entered the National Defense Reserve Fleet at Olympia, Washington, 5 September 1958.

== Vietnam War ==
General John Pope reactivated 17 August 1965 to serve again as a civilian-crewed ship of MSTS, operating from San Francisco. From 1965 through 1970, she transported troops to bases in the Pacific and Far East, supporting the anti-communist struggle in South Vietnam. During three consecutive months, November and December 1966, and January 1967, the General John Pope, along with the USNS General Daniel I. Sultan, transported U.S. military troops to Southeast Asia.

On 6 June 1966, elements of the 503rd Parachute Infantry Regiment boarded the General John Pope at Oakland Army Base. Eighteen days later on 24 June 1966, the 503rd PIR disembarked at Vung Tau, South Vietnam. On 23 July 1966, elements of the 64th Transportation Company boarded the General John Pope, and departed from the Tacoma, Washington Outport Facility, arriving in Okinawa on 5 August 1966. Departing Okinawa the following day, she disembarked the 64th TC at Qui Nhon, South Vietnam on 10 August 1966.

On 20 November 1966 the first elements of the 199th Light Infantry Brigade departed the Oakland Army Base on the General Daniel I. Sultan. Two days later, on 22 November 1966, the General John Pope departed Oakland Army Base with the second of two elements of the 199th Light Infantry Brigade, elements of the 1st and 2nd Brigades of the 9th Infantry Division, and the 58th Field Depot. On 12 December 1966, the 199th Light Infantry Brigade and 9th Infantry Division disembarked the General John Pope in Vung Tau, South Vietnam. Three days later, on 15 December 1966 the 58th Field Depot disembarked the General John Pope at Qui Nhon.

In early January 1967, the General John Pope returned to San Francisco Bay. On 8 January 1967, she departed Oakland Army Base with the remaining elements of the 9th Infantry Division to South Vietnam, disembarking the units at Vung Tau on 30 January 1967. In April 1967, she transported the 589th Engineer Battalion to Qui Nhon from Oakland. On 7 July 1967, the General John Pope departed U.S. Naval Base San Diego, transporting elements of the U.S. Army 244th Aviation Company (aerial surveillance), elements of D Company, 2nd Battalion, 28th Infantry Regiment, and elements of the 3rd Battalion, 9th Marines. On 21 July 1967, she arrived in Okinawa to disembark partial elements of the 3rd Marine Regiment. She arrived at Vung Tau on 29 July 1967 to disembark the 244th Aviation Company and the 2nd Battalion, 28th Infantry Regiment. She sailed on to Da Nang to disembark remaining elements of the 3rd Marine Regiment.

On 1 September 1967, she departed Oakland Army Base with elements of the 1st Battalion (Mechanized), 50th Infantry, reaching Okinawa on 18 September 1967. She departed Okinawa the following day and on 22 September 1967 disembarking the 1st Battalion, 50th Infantry at Qui Nhon. On 1 November 1967, the General John Pope again departed Oakland Army Base with elements of the 61st Assault Helicopter Company, the 92nd Assault Helicopter Company, the 134th Assault Helicopter Company, the third packet of the 221st Signal Company (Pictorial) and the 45th Military Intelligence Detachment, arriving in Okinawa on 17 November 1967 for a 24-hour layover. Departing Okinawa the following day she arrived at Qui Nhon, South Vietnam on 21 November 1967 and disembarked the 61st Assault Helicopter Company. She then departed and arrived at Cam Ranh Bay, South Vietnam on Thanksgiving Day, 23 November 1967 disembarking all units.

== Final years ==
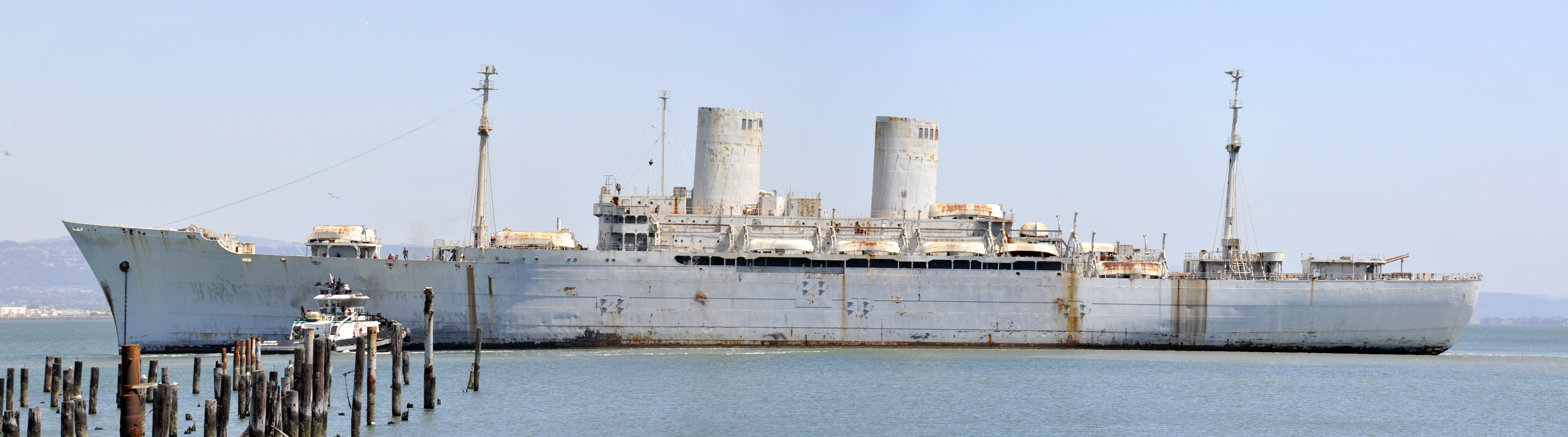
General John Pope being prepared for scrapping, in 2010.

The final years of the General John Pope began when she was placed out of commission once again on 1 May 1970, transferred to MARAD, and laid up in the National Defense Reserve Fleet at Suisun Bay, California. She was struck from the Naval Register on 26 October 1990.

On 5 May 2010, after resting nearly forty years at anchor in Suisun Bay, the General John Pope was towed to Pier 70 dry dock for hull cleaning at BAE Shipyards, in San Francisco Bay. On 18 May 2010, the last surviving P2-S2-R2 U.S. Army Transport vessel of her type, the General John Pope departed San Francisco Bay for her final voyage to Texas.

After a brief stop in San Pedro California, she made passage through the Panama Canal on 15 June 2010, continuing on to ESCO Marine in Brownsville, Texas where she arrived at her final destination for dismantling.

== Awards ==
General John Pope received numerous awards for service in the Second World War, Korean War and Vietnam War: American Campaign Medal, European-African-Middle Eastern Campaign Medal, Asiatic-Pacific Campaign Medal, World War II Victory Medal, Navy Occupation Service Medal (with Asia clasp), National Defense Service Medal (w/2 service stars), Korean Service Medal (w/6 service stars), Vietnam Service Medal, United Nations Service Medal, Republic of Vietnam Campaign Medal, Republic of Korea War Service Medal.
