= 49th Quartermaster Group =

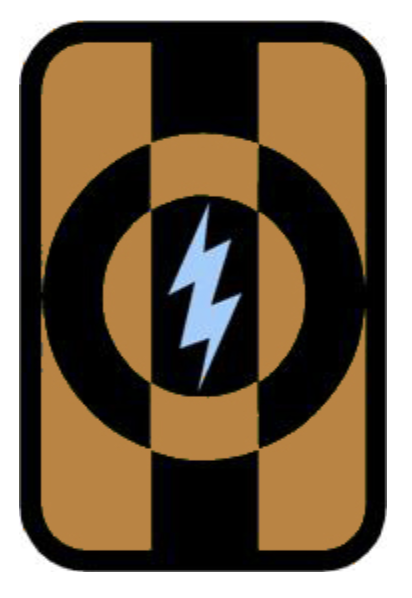
- 49th Quartermaster Group shoulder sleeve insignia
- Active: 1936–1947; 1993–2013
- Country: United States
- Branch: U.S. Army
- Role: Petroleum and water
- Part of: FORSCOM
- Garrison/HQ: Fort Gregg-Adams
- Motto: Fueling the Force
- Engagements: World War II Iraq War

Insignia
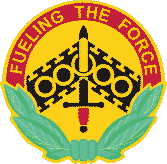
- Distinctive unit insignia

The 49th Quartermaster Group (Petroleum and Water) was a United States Army Forces Command (FORSCOM) combat service support unit stationed at Fort Gregg-Adams (formerly Fort Lee), Virginia. The group motto was "Fueling the Force." Reactivated in 1993, the 49th held an inactivation ceremony at Fort Lee on 14 September 2012. Its subordinate 530th Support Battalion and 108th Quartermaster Company were reassigned to a brigade headquarters to await their own inactivation in September 2013. According to an article in the post newspaper, "The 54th and 111th, the Army's only active duty mortuary affairs units, are not likely to be inactivated but may be transferred. If any of the units remain at Fort Lee, they may be realigned under battalions either at Fort Eustis, home of the 7th Sustainment Brigade, or Fort Bragg, N.C., home of the XVIII Airborne Corps, the 49th's current higher headquarters."

== Subordinate units ==
- 49th Quartermaster Group, Fort Gregg-Adams
  - 240th Quartermaster Battalion (Pipeline) (inactivated 24 June 2011)
  - 530th Combat Sustainment Support Battalion (inactivation ceremony held on 31 May 2013)
    - Headquarters and Headquarters Company
    - 54th Quartermaster Company (Mortuary Affairs)
    - 109th Quartermaster Company (POL)
    - 111th Quartermaster Company (Mortuary Affairs)
    - 64th Transportation Company
    - 612th Movement Control Team

== History ==
Constituted 1 May 1936 in the Regular Army as Headquarters and Headquarters Detachment, 49th Quartermaster Regiment (Truck-Army) (Colored) and allotted to the Fifth Corps area. Redesignated 29 September 1939 as Headquarters and Headquarters Detachment, 49th Quartermaster Regiment (Truck-Corps) (Colored).

Redesignated 8 January 1940 as Headquarters and Headquarters Detachment, 49th Quartermaster Regiment (Truck) (Colored). Redesignated Headquarters and Headquarters Detachment, 49th Quartermaster Truck Regiment (Colored) and activated 1 April 1942 at the Port of San Francisco.

Reorganized and redesignated 14 December 1943 as Headquarters and Headquarters Detachment, 49th Quartermaster Group (Colored). Inactivated 15 November 1947 at Leghorn, Italy.

Redesignated Headquarters and Headquarters Company, 49th Quartermaster Group and activated 1 June 1993 at Fort Lee, Virginia.

CAMPAIGN PARTICIPATION CREDIT

- World War II
- Naples-Foggia
- Rome-Arno
- Po Valley
- North Apennines
- Iraq War

DECORATIONS

- Meritorious Unit Commendation, Streamer embroidered ITALY (HHD 49th QM Gp cited for period 1 October 1944 – 1 January 1945; GO 228 Hq, PBS 25 August 1945)

Meritorious Unit Commendation for exceptional meritorious service as the Theater Bulk Petroleum and Water Group in support of Operation Enduring Freedom and Operation Iraqi Freedom, Iraq, 10 January 2003 to 25 September 2003

== Shoulder Sleeve Insignia ==
Description: On a buff rectangle with rounded corners 2 inches (5.1 cm) in width and 3 inches (7.6 cm) in height overall with a 1 1/8 inches (2.9 cm) black border, a black vertical stripe charged with a light blue flash superimposed by a black annulet counterchanged.

Symbolism: Buff and light blue are the colors traditionally used by the Quartermaster Corps. Black denotes solidity and refers to petroleum; the light blue flash represents speed and quick response. The vertical stripe symbolizes the flow of fuel and water, while the annulet, suggesting a wheel (as on the Quartermaster insignia of branch), highlights the constant movement of supplies and materiel.

Background: The shoulder sleeve insignia (unit patch) was approved on 22 June 1998.

== Distinctive unit insignia ==
Description: A gold color metal and enamel device 1 1/8 inches (2.9 cm) in height overall, consisting of a gold disc bearing a black chevron potente and counterpotente charged with five gold annulets, the center one enfiled by a sword counterchanged with red grip, all within a red semi-circular scroll above inscribed "FUELING THE FORCE" in gold, and green laurel sprigs at bottom.

Symbolism: Buff (gold) is traditionally associated with the Quartermaster Corps. The chevron denotes strength, the potente edges suggest the wards of a key, thereby suggesting the Quartermaster Corps. Black denotes dependability while alluding to fuel and the unit's motto. The sword implies readiness. The annulets recall the Meritorious Unit Commendation and four campaign credits awarded for service in World War II. The laurel stands for honor.

Background: The distinctive unit insignia was approved on 29 April 1993.
