= 125th Brigade Support Battalion =

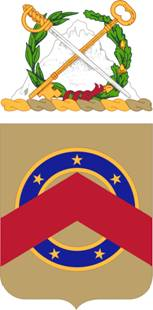
- Coat of arms
- Country: United States
- Branch: United States Army
- Decorations: Valorous Unit Award

Insignia
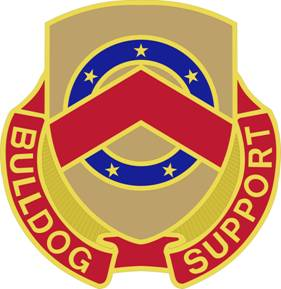
- Distinctive Unit Insignia

125 Brigade Support Battalion The 125th Forward Support Battalion was constituted in 1936 at the 3rd Battalion, 49th Quartermaster Regiment and activated on 1 April 1942 at Berkeley, California, as the 3rd Battalion, 49th Quartermaster Truck Regiment. The 3rd Battalion was broken up and separated in 1943 and its element reorganized and redesignated. On 17 December 1943 the Headquarters and Headquarters Detachment was redesignated as the Headquarters and Headquarters Detachment, 125th Quartermaster Battalion, Mobile. In 1946, the battalion was converted to the 125th Transportation Corps Truck Battalion and inactivated.

The 125th was reactivated in Germany in 1955 and redesignated in 1957 as the 125th Transportation Battalion. While in Germany the unit was inactivated in 1959, activated in 1962 and deactivated in 1965. On 1 May 1987, the 125th Forward Support Battalion was activated in Germany along with Alpha, Bravo and Charlie companies. The 125th was assigned to the 3rd Brigade of the 1st Armored Division. The 125th Forward Support Battalion was temporarily moved to Fort Lewis, Washington and deactivated in 1995.

It was not until 16 February 1996 that the 125th Forward Support Battalion with the 3rd Brigade of the 1st Armored Division found its home at Fort Riley, Kansas. At that time, the 596th Signal Company was attached to the 125th, allowing the battalion to provide logistics support, maintenance support, medical support and communication support for the entire Brigade. 125th FSB was included in operation Iraqi freedom in March 2003 – February 2004 Ramadia Iraq(Camp payne). Than again deployed to Iraq in 2005–2006 at Taji, Iraq. Inactivated on 15 March 2008 at Fort Riley, Kansas. The 125th Brigade Support Battalion was redesignated and reactivated on 16 August 2009, at Fort Bliss, Texas in support of the 3rd Infantry Brigade Combat Team, 1st Armored Division, the first BCT of its kind in the 1st Armored Division. On order, the 125th Brigade Support Battalion deploys to a designated theater, conducts full spectrum combat service support operations in a joint or combined environment and redeploys to home station.
