= 125th Brigade =

125th Brigade may refer to:

- 125th Mixed Brigade, Spain
- 125th Heavy Mechanized Brigade, Ukrainian Territorial Defense Forces
- 125th (Lancashire Fusiliers) Brigade, United Kingdom

== See also ==
- 125th Brigade Support Battalion, United States
- 125th Division (disambiguation)
- 125th Regiment (disambiguation)
