= 125th Weather Flight =

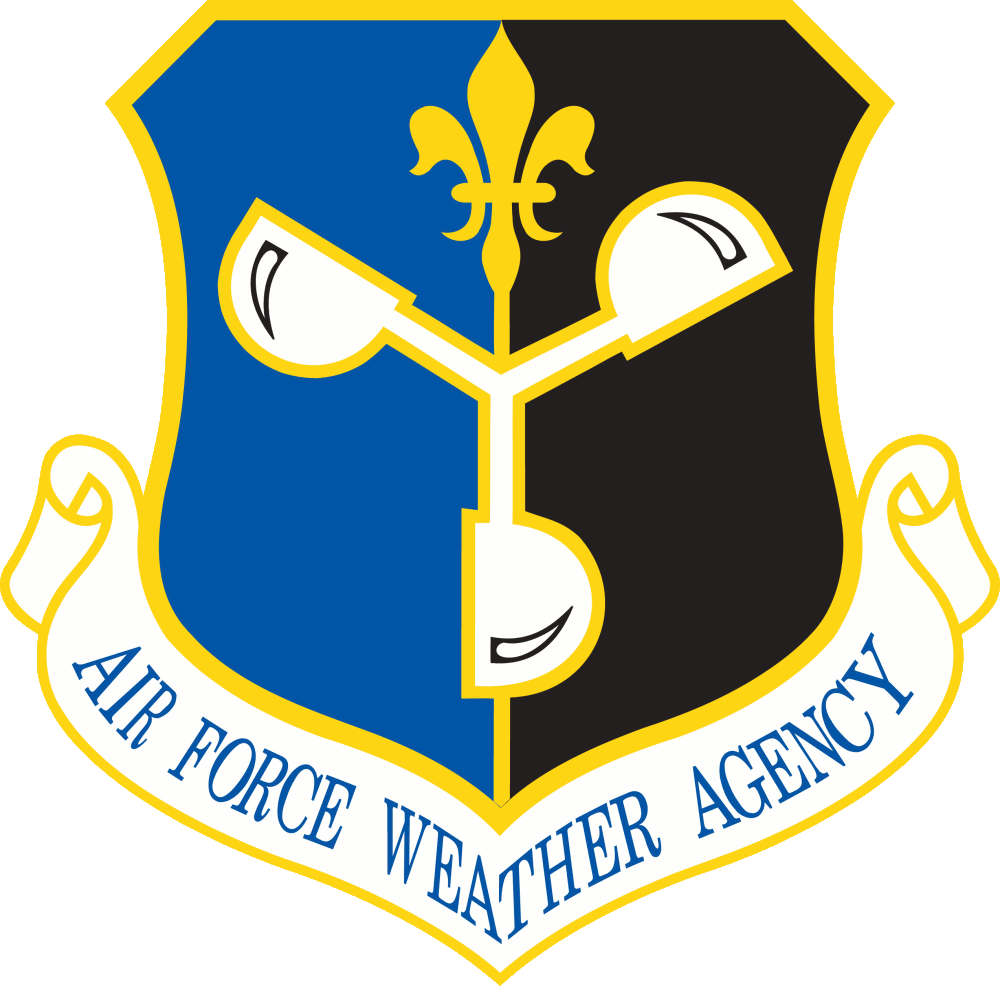
- Weather Emblem
- Active: 1957 – present
- Country: United States
- Branch: United States Air Force
- Role: Battlefield Meteorological Control
- Size: 11
- Part of: Air Combat Command
- Garrison/HQ: Tinker AFB, Oklahoma City, Oklahoma
- Nickname(s): The Fightn' Twisters
- Patron: Saint Amandus

Commanders
- Current commander: Major Devon Lynch

The United States Air Force's 125th Weather Flight (125th WF) is a combat weather team located at Tinker AFB in Oklahoma City, Oklahoma.

== Mission ==
The mission of the 125th WF is to provide strategic meteorological information within an adequate amount of time, after given appropriate notice of changing meteorological elements. Being a combat team, the team's mission also includes five additional primary missions: unconventional warfare, foreign internal defense, special reconnaissance, direct action, and counter-terrorism. Although not specifically a part of the Special Operations Force (SOF) of the United States Army, the 125th Weather Flight does directly support it.

== Assignments ==
=== Major Command ===
- Air Combat Command (1957 – present)

== Bases stationed ==
- Tinker AFB, Oklahoma City, Oklahoma (2002 – present)
- Will Rogers World Airport, Oklahoma City, Oklahoma (1973–2002)

== Decorations ==
- Air Force Outstanding Unit Award
