= 125th Division (2nd Formation) (People's Republic of China) =

1st Independent Division of Guangdong Provincial Military District (1966-68) 125th Army Division (1968–85)
- Active: 1966.9 - 1985
- Country: People's Republic of China
- Branch: People's Liberation Army
- Type: Division
- Role: Infantry
- Engagements: Sino-Vietnamese War

1st Independent Division of Guangdong Provincial Military District (Chinese: 广东省军区独立第1师) was formed in September 1966 from Artillery Firing Range of Guangzhou Military Region and twelve independent battalions of Guangdong Provincial Military District.

The division was composed of 3 infantry regiments (1st to 3rd) and 2 artillery battalions (artillery and antiaircraft artillery).

In September 1968 its 3rd regiment was detached and renamed as 114th Garrison Regiment. The division itself was transferred to 42nd Army Corps and renamed as 125th Army Division(Chinese: 陆军第125师). The division was composed of 373rd, 374th and 375th Infantry Regiments, and Artillery Regiment.

In 1979 the division took part in the Sino-Vietnamese War.

In 1985 the division was disbanded. Its 373rd and 374th Infantry Regiments were transferred to 126th Infantry Division. In September 1989 374th Regiment was disbanded. 373rd Infantry Regiment is now 373rd Regiment, 126th Armed Police Mobile Division.
