= 64th Transportation Company =

The 64th Transportation Company was constituted 1 May 1936 in the Regular Army as Company A, 1st Battalion, 29th Quartermaster Regiment. It was activated 1 June 1941 at Fort Leonard Wood, Missouri.

It also reorganized and redesignated 20 August 1943 as Company A, 1st Battalion, 29th Quartermaster Truck Regiment.

== Unit history ==
It was reorganized and redesignated again on 2 December 1943, as the 3441st Quartermaster Truck Company. Later converted and redesignated 1 August 1946 as the 3441st Transportation Corps Truck Company. It would later be redesignated 30 June 1947 as the 64th Transportation Truck Company. It reorganized and redesignated 1 April 1954 as the 64th Transportation Company. It became inactive 1 June 1955 on Okinawa, after the Korean war. It was reactivated 27 August 1955 at Fort Sill, Oklahoma and inactivated 19 February 1962 at Fort Knox, Kentucky, this was the only time that the unit would support a peace time mission.

The 64th activated once again on 26 March 1963 at Fort Bragg, North Carolina, to serve during the Vietnam War until it was inactivated 16 June 1971 in Vietnam.

It remained deactivated for 35 years the unit activated 16 October 2008 at Fort Lee, Virginia. Its sole purpose would be, to support Operation Responsible Drawdown in Iraq. The unit deployed to Camp Arifjan, Kuwait to support the drawdown. 64th was crucial in meeting the deadline for the successful departure at the close of Operation Iraqi Freedom and the transition to Operation New Dawn. The company logged over 2 million miles, and supported over 300 convoys from Kuwait to Iraq. The company was made up of a headquarters and maintenance platoon, and 3 line platoons; 2 convoy escort platoons and 1 combat logistics patrol platoon. The unit was inactivated upon its return to Fort Lee, in October 2011.

=== Campaign participation credit ===
- World War II: East Indies; Papua; New Guinea
- Vietnam: Counteroffensive, Phase II; Counteroffensive, Phase III; Tet Counteroffensive; Counteroffensive, Phase IV; Counteroffensive, Phase V; Counteroffensive, Phase VI; Tet 69/Counteroffensive; Summer-Fall 1969; Winter-Spring 1970; Sanctuary Counteroffensive; Counteroffensive, Phase VII
- Global War On Terror: Operation Iraqi Freedom, Operation New Dawn

=== Decorations ===
- Presidential Unit Citation (Army), Streamer embroidered PAPUA
- Meritorious Unit Commendation (Army), Streamer embroidered VIETNAM 1967-1968
- Meritorious Unit Commendation (Army), Streamer embroidered VIETNAM 1969-1970
- Republic of Vietnam Cross of Gallantry with Gold Star, Streamer embroidered VIETNAM 1966-1971
