= 125th Street =

125th Street may refer:

== Art, entertainment, and media ==
- 125th Street (musical), a stage show which opened in September 2002 at London's Shaftesbury Theatre

== Roads, bridges, and train stations ==
- 125th Street (Manhattan), a street in Manhattan, New York City
- Florida State Road 822 in Miami-Dade County, locally known as 125th Street
- Harlem–125th Street station, a commuter railroad station in Manhattan
- Stations of the New York City subway and its predecessors:
  - 125th Street station (IND Eighth Avenue Line), at St. Nicholas Avenue; serving the A, B, C, and D trains
  - 125th Street station (IRT Broadway–Seventh Avenue Line), at Broadway; serving the 1 train
  - 125th Street station (IRT Lenox Avenue Line), at Malcolm X Boulevard; serving the 2 and 3 trains
  - 125th Street station (IRT Lexington Avenue Line), at Lexington Avenue; serving the 4, 5, 6, and <6> trains
  - 125th Street station (IRT Ninth Avenue Line), at Eighth Avenue (demolished)
  - 125th Street station (IRT Second Avenue Line), at Second Avenue (demolished)
  - 125th Street station (IRT Third Avenue Line), at Third Avenue (demolished)
