= 125th Regiment of Foot =

Infantry regiment of the British Army

The 125th Regiment of Foot was an infantry regiment of the British Army, created in 1794 and disbanded in 1796. It was raised at Stamford, Lincolnshire, under the colonelcy of Newton Treen.
