= Lexington Avenue Express =

Lexington Avenue Express is the name of the following subway services in New York City, that run from the Bronx, through Lexington Avenue in Manhattan, to Brooklyn:

- Lexington Avenue Express-Woodlawn or 4 (New York City Subway service)
- Lexington Avenue Express-Dyre Avenue or 5 (New York City Subway service)
