= Duffy's Hill =

Hill in New York, U.S.

Coordinates: 40°47′23″N 73°56′53″W

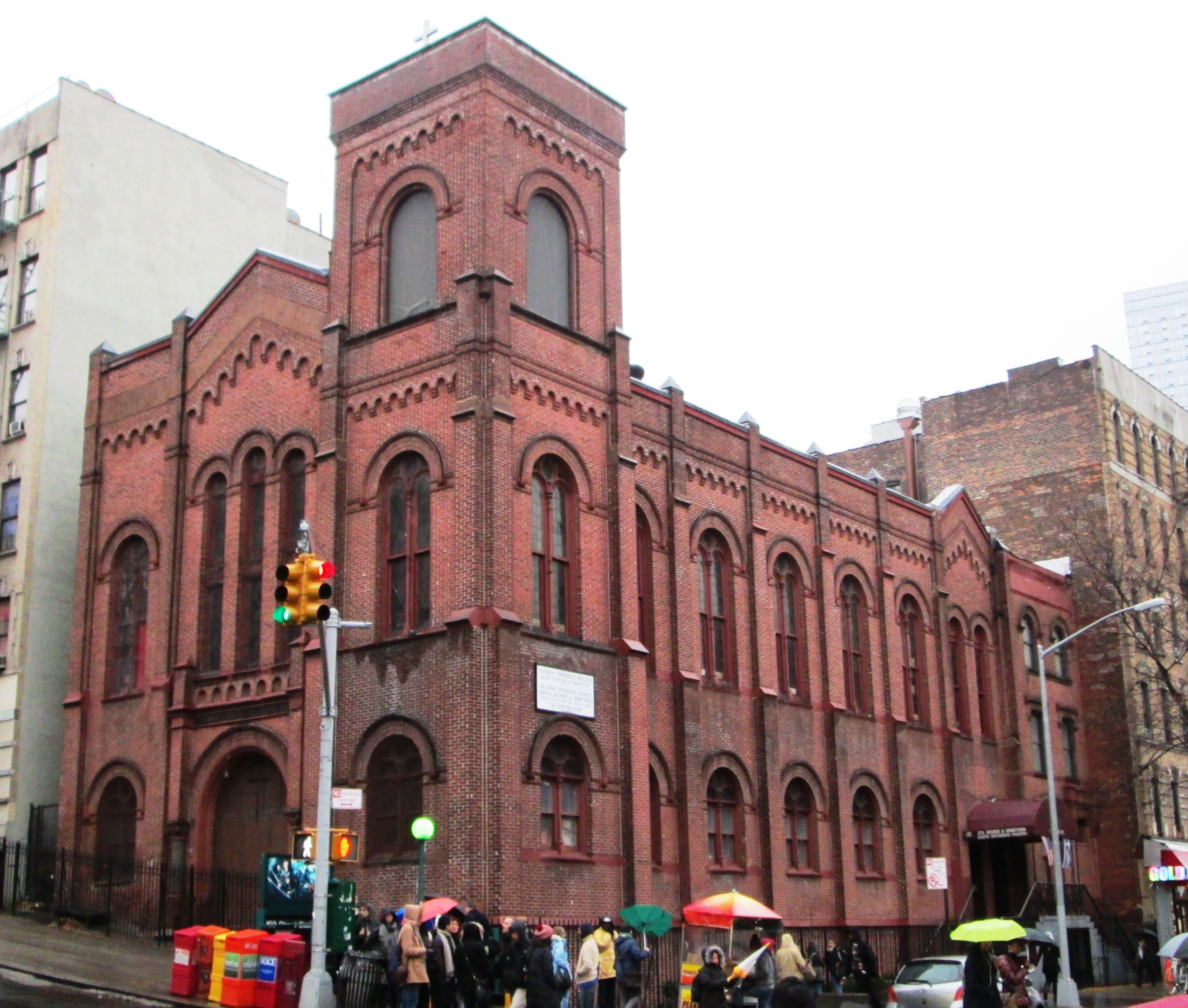
The Hellenic Orthodox Church of Sts. George and Demetrios, originally built in 1891 as the Blinn Memorial Methodist Episcopal Church, sits at the base of the hill at 103rd Street

Duffy's Hill is a hill located on Lexington Avenue between 102nd and 103rd Streets in the East Harlem neighborhood of Manhattan, New York City. It was named for Michael James Duffy, a Tammany Hall Alderman who spent $250,000 to build 26 rowhouses on the south side of 101st Street between Lexington and Park Avenues in 1894. He continued building between Third Avenue and Lexington Avenue up to 104th Street, a section of the city sometimes known at the time as "Duffyville".

The hill marked the site of cable car accidents by 1897, as the cars had to quickly accelerate and decelerate at this point. The New York Railways Corporation had a 24-hour guard stationed at the base of the hill at 103rd Street by 1937 to watch over streetcar incidents related to the hill. At one time, Lexington Avenue buses would detour onto Park Avenue to avoid the hill.

The National Board of Fire Underwriters noted that Lexington Avenue's grade of 12.6% was the steepest of any "important localit[y]" in Manhattan. The entrances to the 103rd Street station of the New York City Subway, served by the 6 and <6> trains, are located at the bottom of the hill.
