= 96th Street station (IRT Lexington Avenue Line) =

New York City Subway station in Manhattan

96 Street
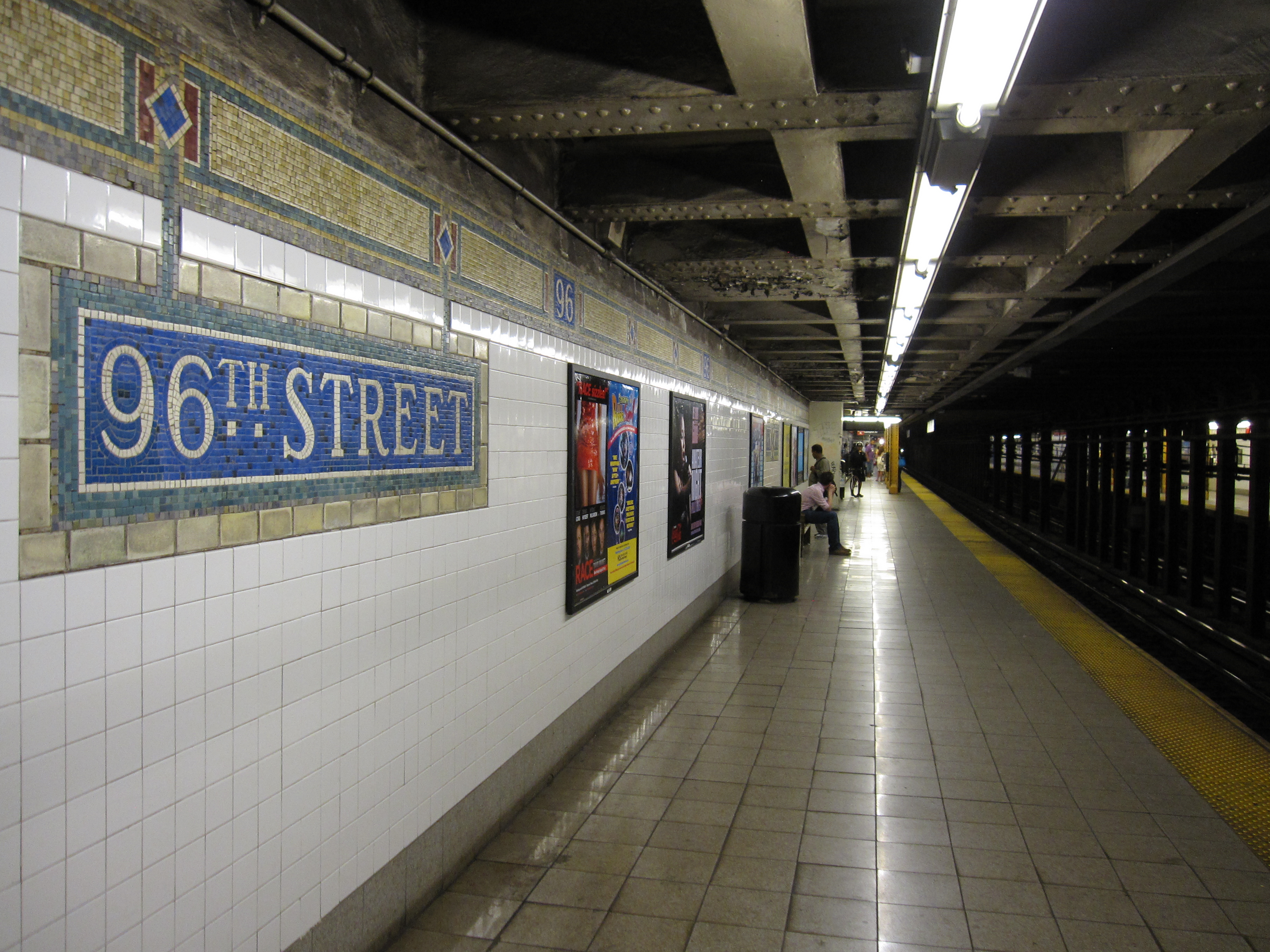
- Northbound platform

Station statistics
- Address: East 96th Street & Lexington Avenue; New York, New York
- Borough: Manhattan
- Locale: Carnegie Hill & East Harlem
- Coordinates: 40.785773°N 73.950949°W
- Division: A (IRT)
- Line: IRT Lexington Avenue Line
- Services: 4 (late nights); 6 (all times) <6> (weekdays until 8:45 p.m., peak direction)
- Transit: NYCT Bus: M96, M98, M101, M102, M103; MTA Bus: BxM1, BxM7, BxM10; Short Line Bus: 208
- Structure: Underground
- Platforms: 2 side platforms
- Tracks: 2

Other information
- Opened: July 17, 1918 (108 years ago)

Traffic
- 2025: 3,981,476 ▲3.6%
- Rank: 86 out of 423
Services
Preceding station	New York City Subway	Following station
103rd Street 4 6 <6> toward Pelham Bay Park	Local	86th Street 4 6 <6> toward Brooklyn Bridge–City Hall
does not stop here
Location
Location within New York City Subway
Location within New York City
Location within New York
Track layout
Street map
Station service legend
Symbol	Description
Stops all times	Stops all times
Stops late nights only	Stops late nights only
Stops rush hours in the peak direction only	Stops rush hours in the peak direction only

The 96th Street station is a local station on the IRT Lexington Avenue Line of the New York City Subway. Located at the intersection of Lexington Avenue and 96th Street in the Carnegie Hill and East Harlem neighborhoods of Manhattan, it is served by the 6 train at all times, the <6> train during weekdays in the peak direction, and the 4 train during late nights.

This station was constructed as part of the Dual Contracts by the Interborough Rapid Transit Company and opened in 1918. It was renovated in the 1990s.

== History ==
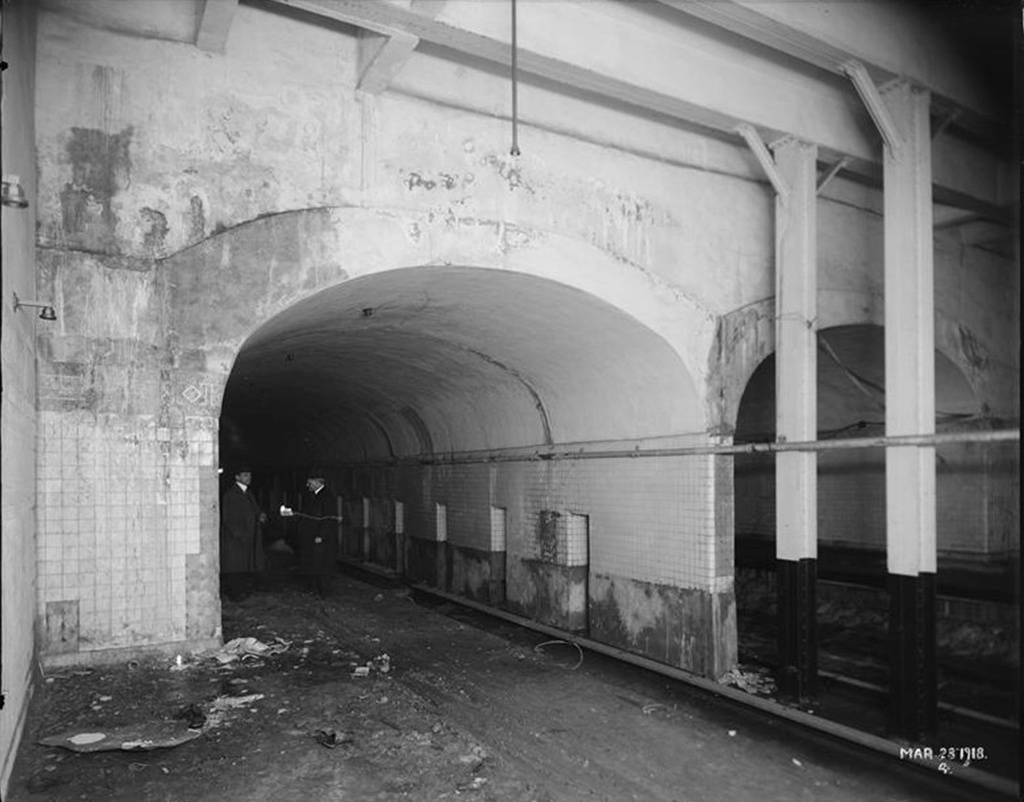
A view of the station in March 1918, before it opened

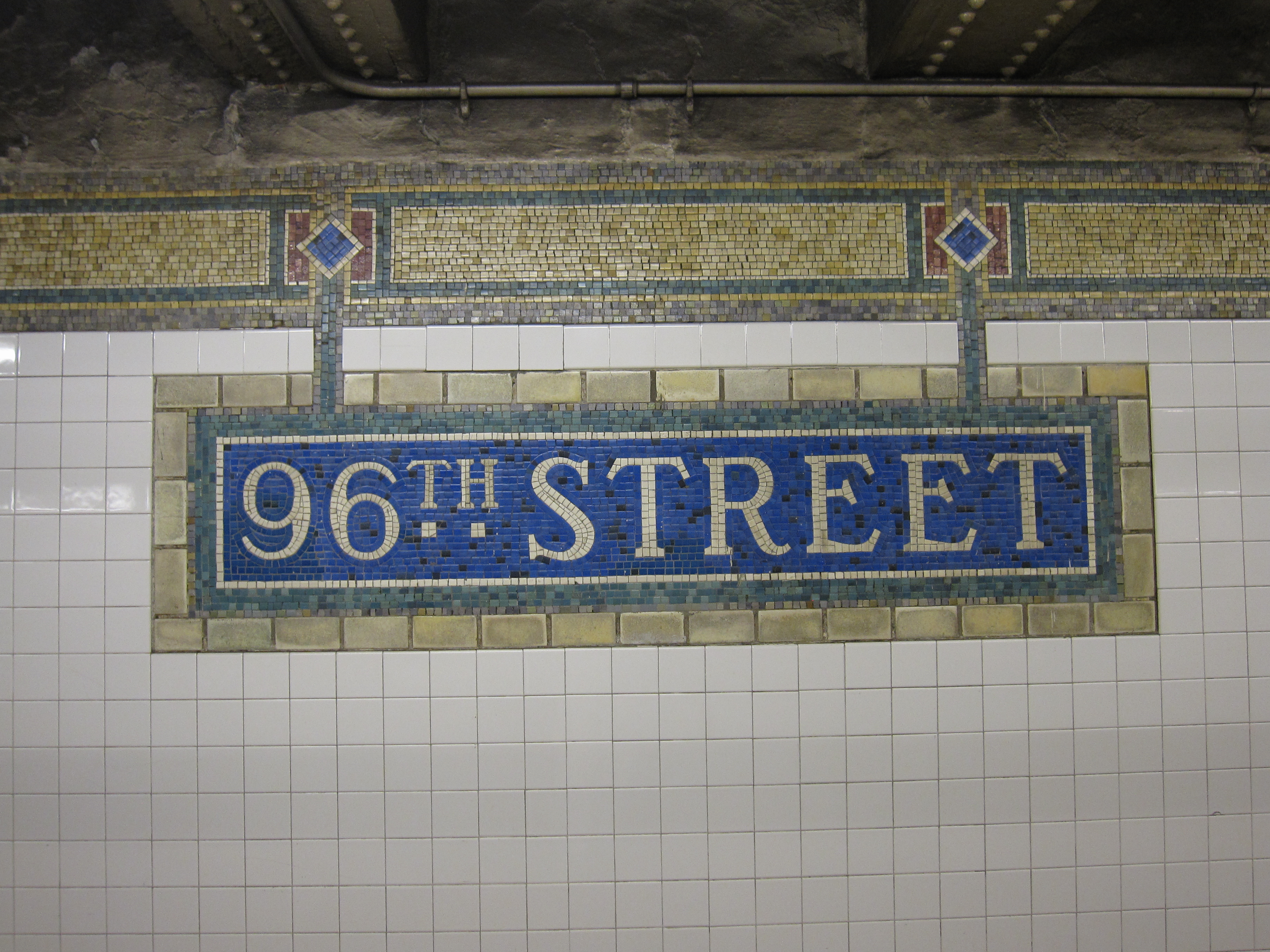
Name mosaic

Following the completion of the original subway, there were plans to construct a line along Manhattan's east side north of 42nd Street. The original plan for what became the extension north of 42nd Street was to continue it south through Irving Place and into what is now the BMT Broadway Line at Ninth Street and Broadway. In July 1911, the IRT had withdrawn from the talks, and the Brooklyn Rapid Transit Company (BRT) was to operate on Lexington Avenue. The IRT submitted an offer for what became its portion of the Dual Contracts on February 27, 1912.

In 1913, as part of the Dual Contracts, which were signed on March 19, 1913, the Public Service Commission planned to split the original Interborough Rapid Transit Company (IRT) system from looking like a "Z" system (as seen on a map) to an H-shaped system. The original system would be split into three segments: two north–south lines, carrying through trains over the Lexington Avenue and Broadway–Seventh Avenue Lines, and a west–east shuttle under 42nd Street. This would form a roughly H-shaped system. It was predicted that the subway extension would lead to the growth of the Upper East Side and the Bronx.

The 96th Street station opened on July 17, 1918, with service initially running between Grand Central–42nd Street and 167th Street via the line's local tracks. On August 1, the "H system" was put into place, with through service beginning on the new east and west side trunk lines, and the institution of the 42nd Street Shuttle along the old connection between the sides. The cost of the extension from Grand Central was $58 million.

The city government took over the IRT's operations on June 12, 1940. The station was renovated in the 1990s, and had its original tilework restored.

== Station layout ==
The station has two local tracks and two side platforms. The 6 stops here at all times, and the 4 stops here during late nights. The express tracks run on a lower level and are not visible from the platforms. The station is between 103rd Street to the north and 86th Street to the south. Fixed platform barriers, which are intended to prevent commuters falling to the tracks, are positioned near the platform edges.

A crossover is provided, with a mosaic in the mezzanine entitled City Suite, commissioned in 1994. There are new "96th Street" mosaics, and a window in the mezzanine overlooks the tracks, giving a view of oncoming trains from the south. The south end of the station features a rounded ceiling due to problems encountered during construction. Both platforms have emergency exits from the lower level express tracks.

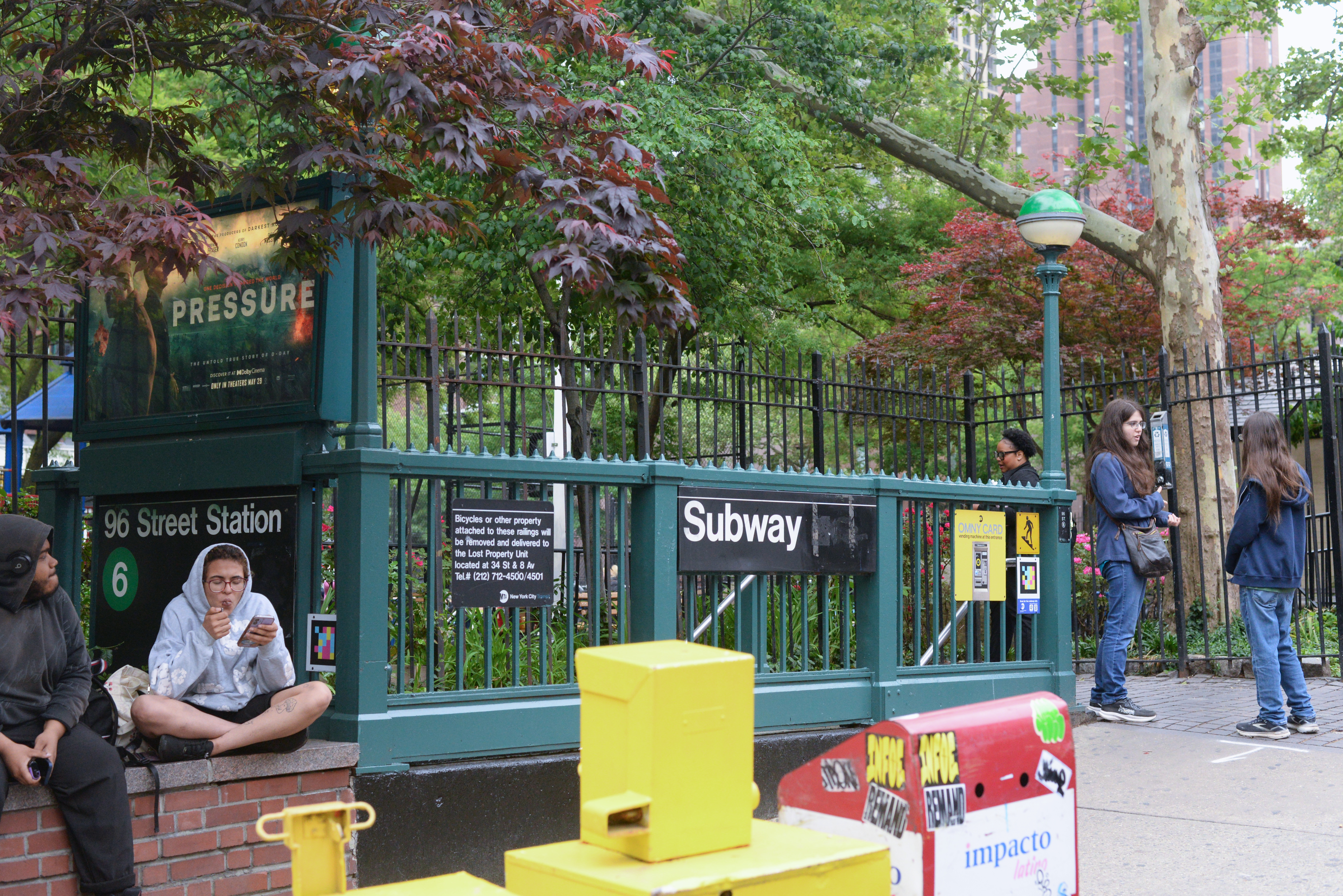
Staircase entrance next to the Samuel Seabury playground

=== Exits ===
The station has staircases leading to all four corners of the intersection of Lexington Avenue and 96th Street.
