= 110th Street station (IRT Lexington Avenue Line) =

New York City Subway station in Manhattan

110 Street
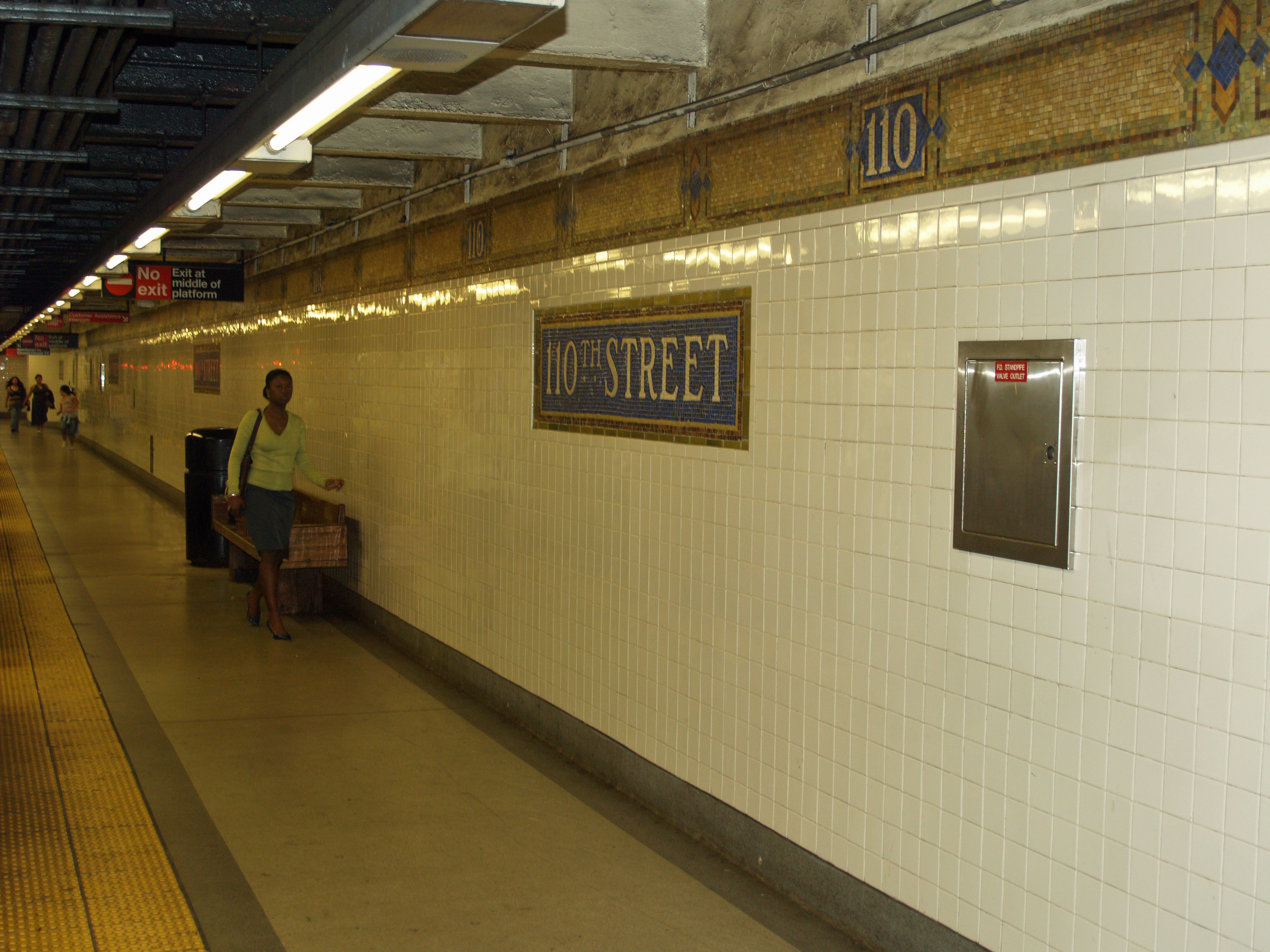

Station statistics
- Address: East 110th Street & Lexington Avenue; New York, New York
- Borough: Manhattan
- Locale: East Harlem
- Coordinates: 40.794773°N 73.944426°W
- Division: A (IRT)
- Line: IRT Lexington Avenue Line
- Services: 4 (late nights); 6 (all times) <6> (weekdays until 8:45 p.m., peak direction)
- Transit: NYCT Bus: M101, M102, M103
- Structure: Underground
- Platforms: 2 side platforms
- Tracks: 4

Other information
- Opened: July 17, 1918; 108 years ago
- Accessible: No; under construction

Traffic
- 2025: 2,414,168 ▲18.8%
- Rank: 154 out of 423
Services
Preceding station	New York City Subway	Following station
116th Street 4 6 <6> toward Pelham Bay Park	Local	103rd Street 4 6 <6> toward Brooklyn Bridge–City Hall
does not stop here
Location
Location within New York City Subway
Location within New York City
Location within New York
Track layout
Street map
Station service legend
Symbol	Description
Stops all times	Stops all times
Stops late nights only	Stops late nights only
Stops rush hours in the peak direction only	Stops rush hours in the peak direction only

The 110th Street station is a local station on the IRT Lexington Avenue Line of the New York City Subway. Located in East Harlem at the intersection of 110th Street and Lexington Avenue, it is served by the 6 train at all times, the <6> train during weekdays in the peak direction, and the 4 train during late nights.

This station was constructed as part of the Dual Contracts by the Interborough Rapid Transit Company and opened in 1918. It was renovated from 2002 to 2004, and further renovations are planned to add elevators, making the station compliant with the Americans with Disabilities Act of 1990.

== History ==
=== Construction and opening ===
Following the completion of the original subway, there were plans to construct a line along Manhattan's east side north of 42nd Street. The original plan for what became the extension north of 42nd Street was to continue it south through Irving Place and into what is now the BMT Broadway Line at Ninth Street and Broadway. In July 1911, the IRT had withdrawn from the talks, and the Brooklyn Rapid Transit Company (BRT) was to operate on Lexington Avenue. The IRT submitted an offer for what became its portion of the Dual Contracts on February 27, 1912.

In 1913, as part of the Dual Contracts, which were signed on March 19, 1913, the Public Service Commission planned to split the original Interborough Rapid Transit Company (IRT) system from looking like a "Z" system (as seen on a map) to an H-shaped system. The original system would be split into three segments: two north–south lines, carrying through trains over the Lexington Avenue and Broadway–Seventh Avenue Lines, and a west–east shuttle under 42nd Street. This would form a roughly H-shaped system. It was predicted that the subway extension would lead to the growth of the Upper East Side and the Bronx.

The 110th Street station opened on July 17, 1918, with service initially running between Grand Central–42nd Street and 167th Street via the line's local tracks. On August 1, the "H system" was put into place, with through service beginning on the new east and west side trunk lines, and the institution of the 42nd Street Shuttle along the old connection between the sides. The cost of the extension from Grand Central was $58 million.

=== Later years ===
The city government took over the IRT's operations on June 12, 1940.

On March 20, 1991, a woman was raped behind a pile of debris in the subway passageway connecting the 34th Street–Herald Square and 42nd Street–Bryant Park stations under Sixth Avenue during rush hour, which had entrances at 38th Street. This was the longest passageway in the system. That passageway was closed the day after and recorded 30 felonies since January 1, 1990. In response, on March 28, 1991, the NYCTA ordered the closing of the 15 most dangerous passageways in the system within a week, which the Transit Police and citizen advocacy groups had called for since the previous year. The locations were chosen based on crime volume, lighting, traffic and physical layout. These entrances were closed under the declaration of a public safety emergency, and were blocked off with plywood and fencing until public hearings were held and official permission was obtained. One of the stations that had an entrance closed was 110th Street, which has the exit-only staircase at 111th Street from the northbound platform closed. 52 felonies had occurred at the station since January 1, 1990. The entrance was permanently closed in 1992, following a public hearing.

In June 2002, it was announced that 110th Street would be one of ten subway stations citywide to receive renovations. Work on these ten renovation projects was estimated to cost almost $146 million, and was scheduled to start later that year, and be completed in April 2004. The renovation projects made repairs to platforms, replaced or refurbished stairways, installed new lighting and tiles, and reconfigured fare control areas.

In May 2018, New York City Transit Authority President Andy Byford announced his plan subway and bus modernization plan, known as Fast Forward, which included making an additional 50 stations compliant with the Americans with Disabilities Act of 1990 during the 2020–2024 Metropolitan Transportation Authority (MTA) Capital Program to allow most riders to have an accessible station every two or three stops. The draft 2020–2024 Capital Program released in September 2019 included 66 stations that would receive ADA improvements. In December, the MTA announced that an additional twenty stations, including 110th Street, would be made ADA-accessible as part of the Capital Program. In May 2024, the Federal Transit Administration awarded the MTA $157 million for accessibility renovations at five stations, including 110th Street. The funds would be used to add elevators, signs, and public-announcement systems, as well as repair platforms and stairs, at each station. The accessibility project was to be funded by congestion pricing in New York City, but it was postponed in June 2024 after the implementation of congestion pricing was delayed. However, after congestion pricing was approved, the MTA announced that the elevator installations would proceed.

== Station layout ==
This underground station has four tracks and two side platforms. The two center express tracks are used by the 4 and 5 trains during daytime hours. The 6 stops here at all times, and the 4 stops here during late nights. The station is between 116th Street to the north and 103rd Street to the south.

Both platforms have their original trim line, which has "110" tablets on it at regular intervals, and name tablets, which read "110TH STREET" in serif font.

The artwork at this station is a mosaic entitled Un Sábado en la Ciento Diez (A Saturday on 110th), by Manuel Vega in 1996.

=== Exits ===
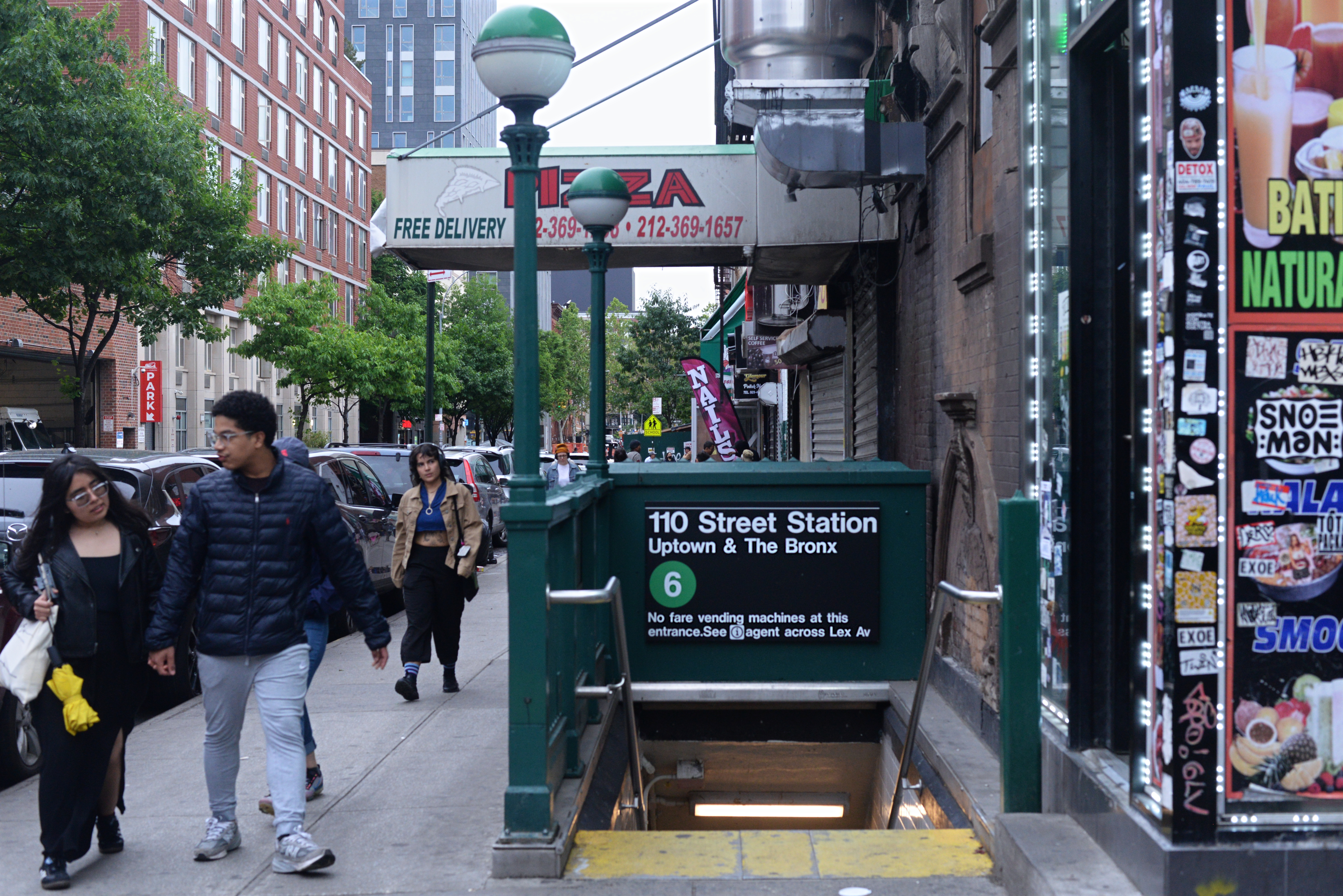
Uptown entrance

Each platform has one same-level fare control area at the center. Each one has a turnstile bank, token booth, and two street stairs. The ones on the southbound platform go up to either western corners of Lexington Avenue and 110th Street, while the ones on the northbound platform go up to either eastern corners. There are no crossovers or crossunders to allow a free transfer between directions. Both platforms used to have second exits at their northern ends to 111th Street. The entrance on the northbound platform to the southeastern corner of 111th Street and Lexington Avenue was closed due to safety reasons in 1992 and was subsequently slabbed over. The only evidence of this exit is a steel door in the wall. The entrance on the northbound platform closed some time before 1992.
