= 103rd Street station (IRT Lexington Avenue Line) =

New York City Subway station in Manhattan

103 Street
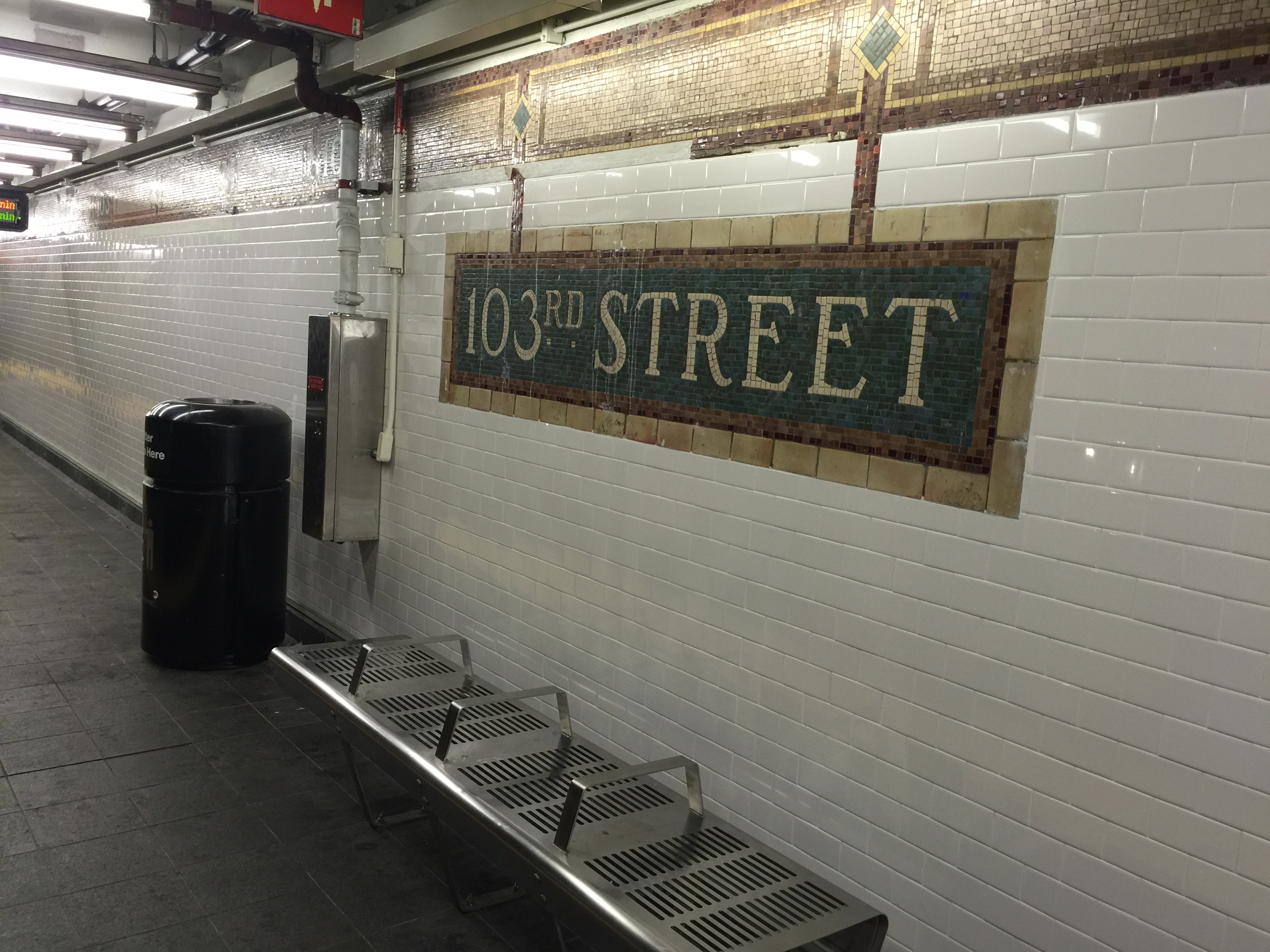
- Southbound platform

Station statistics
- Address: East 103rd Street & Lexington Avenue; New York, New York
- Borough: Manhattan
- Locale: East Harlem
- Coordinates: 40.79029°N 73.947687°W
- Division: A (IRT)
- Line: IRT Lexington Avenue Line
- Services: 4 (late nights); 6 (all times) <6> (weekdays until 8:45 p.m., peak direction)
- Transit: NYCT Bus: M101, M102, M103
- Structure: Underground
- Platforms: 2 side platforms
- Tracks: 4

Other information
- Opened: July 17, 1918 (108 years ago)

Traffic
- 2025: 2,898,300 ▲16.2%
- Rank: 133 out of 423
Services
Preceding station	New York City Subway	Following station
110th Street 4 6 <6> toward Pelham Bay Park	Local	96th Street 4 6 <6> toward Brooklyn Bridge–City Hall
does not stop here
Location
Location within New York City Subway
Location within New York City
Location within New York
Track layout
Street map
Station service legend
Symbol	Description
Stops all times	Stops all times
Stops late nights only	Stops late nights only
Stops rush hours in the peak direction only	Stops rush hours in the peak direction only

The 103rd Street station is a local station on the IRT Lexington Avenue Line of the New York City Subway. Located at the intersection of Lexington Avenue and 103rd Street in East Harlem, it is served by the 6 train at all times, the <6> train during weekdays in the peak direction, and the 4 train during late nights.

This station was constructed as part of the Dual Contracts by the Interborough Rapid Transit Company and opened in 1918. It was renovated in 1990 and in 2015–2016.

== History ==
=== Construction and opening ===
Following the completion of the original subway, there were plans to construct a line along Manhattan's east side north of 42nd Street. The original plan for what became the extension north of 42nd Street was to continue it south through Irving Place and into what is now the BMT Broadway Line at Ninth Street and Broadway. In July 1911, the IRT had withdrawn from the talks, and the Brooklyn Rapid Transit Company (BRT) was to operate on Lexington Avenue. The IRT submitted an offer for what became its portion of the Dual Contracts on February 27, 1912.

In 1913, as part of the Dual Contracts, which were signed on March 19, 1913, the Public Service Commission planned to split the original Interborough Rapid Transit Company (IRT) system from looking like a "Z" system (as seen on a map) to an H-shaped system. The original system would be split into three segments: two north–south lines, carrying through trains over the Lexington Avenue and Broadway–Seventh Avenue Lines, and a west–east shuttle under 42nd Street. This would form a roughly H-shaped system. It was predicted that the subway extension would lead to the growth of the Upper East Side and the Bronx.

The 103rd Street station opened on July 17, 1918, with service initially running between Grand Central–42nd Street and 167th Street via the line's local tracks. On August 1, the "H system" was put into place, with through service beginning on the new east and west side trunk lines, and the institution of the 42nd Street Shuttle along the old connection between the sides. The cost of the extension from Grand Central was $58 million (equivalent to $1.241482301×10^{9} in 2025).

=== Later years ===
The city government took over the IRT's operations on June 12, 1940.

In 1981, the Metropolitan Transportation Authority (MTA) listed the 103rd Street station among the 69 most deteriorated stations in the subway system. A renovation of the 103rd Street station was funded as part of the MTA's 1980–1984 capital plan. The MTA received a $106 million (equivalent to $328,491,352 in 2025) grant from the Urban Mass Transit Administration in October 1983; most of the grant would fund the renovation of eleven stations, including 103rd Street. This station was renovated in 1990.

The Downtown platform was renovated in 2015, with the placement of new white wall tiles, new floor tiles and benches. From January 26, 2016, to May 23, 2016, the Uptown platform was closed for renovation and was done in the same style as the Downtown platform. This was completed about a month earlier than planned.

== Station layout ==
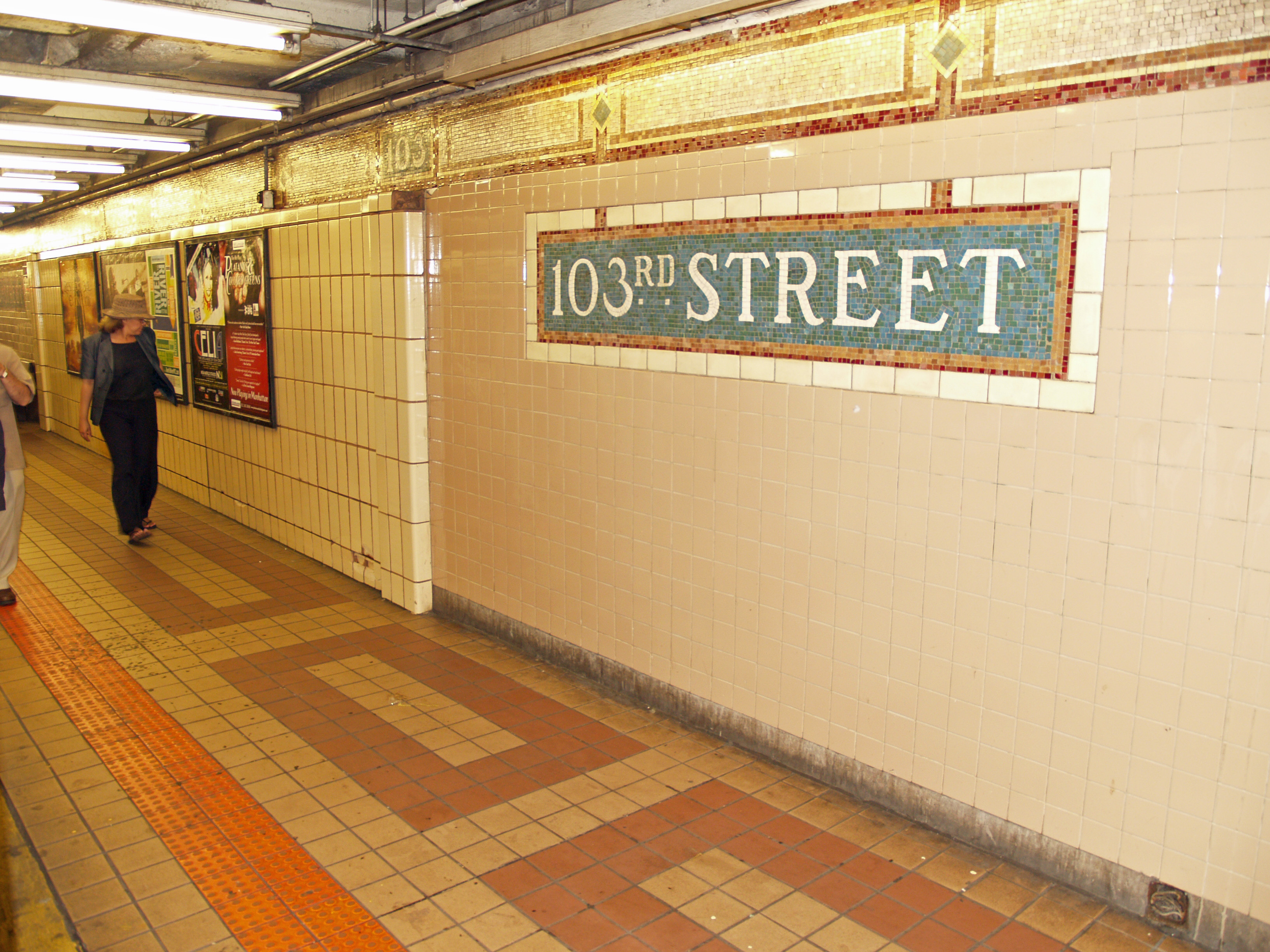
Wall tiles prior to 2015 renovation

This underground station has four tracks and two side platforms. The two center express tracks are used by the 4 and 5 trains during daytime hours. The 6 stops here at all times, and the 4 stops here during late nights. The station is between 110th Street to the north and 96th Street to the south.

All other stations between Grand Central–42nd Street and 125th Street on the line, except 110th Street, have the local tracks on an upper level and express ones on the lower level, with emergency exits provided at local stations for emergency egress.

Both platforms have their original trim line, which has "103" tablets on it at regular intervals, and name tablets, which read "103RD STREET" in the original mosaic. Prior to the 1990 station renovation, mosaic tiles were used so as to depict the 103rd Street mosaic as a sign hanging down from a horizontal support beam above. These "signholders" were covered over in 1990. An emergency phone is present immediately to the south of the southbound local platform.

The 1990 ceramic artwork here is called Neo-Boriken by Nitza Tufiño, based on the neighborhood's Caribbean and Latin American heritage. According to the accompanying plaque, P.R.O.M.I.S.E. (Puerto Rican Organization for Growth Research Education and Self Sufficiency) helped to fund the murals. This is one of two projects Tufiño made for MTA Arts & Design; the other, Westside Views – a community project for which she was the lead artist – can be found at 86th Street.

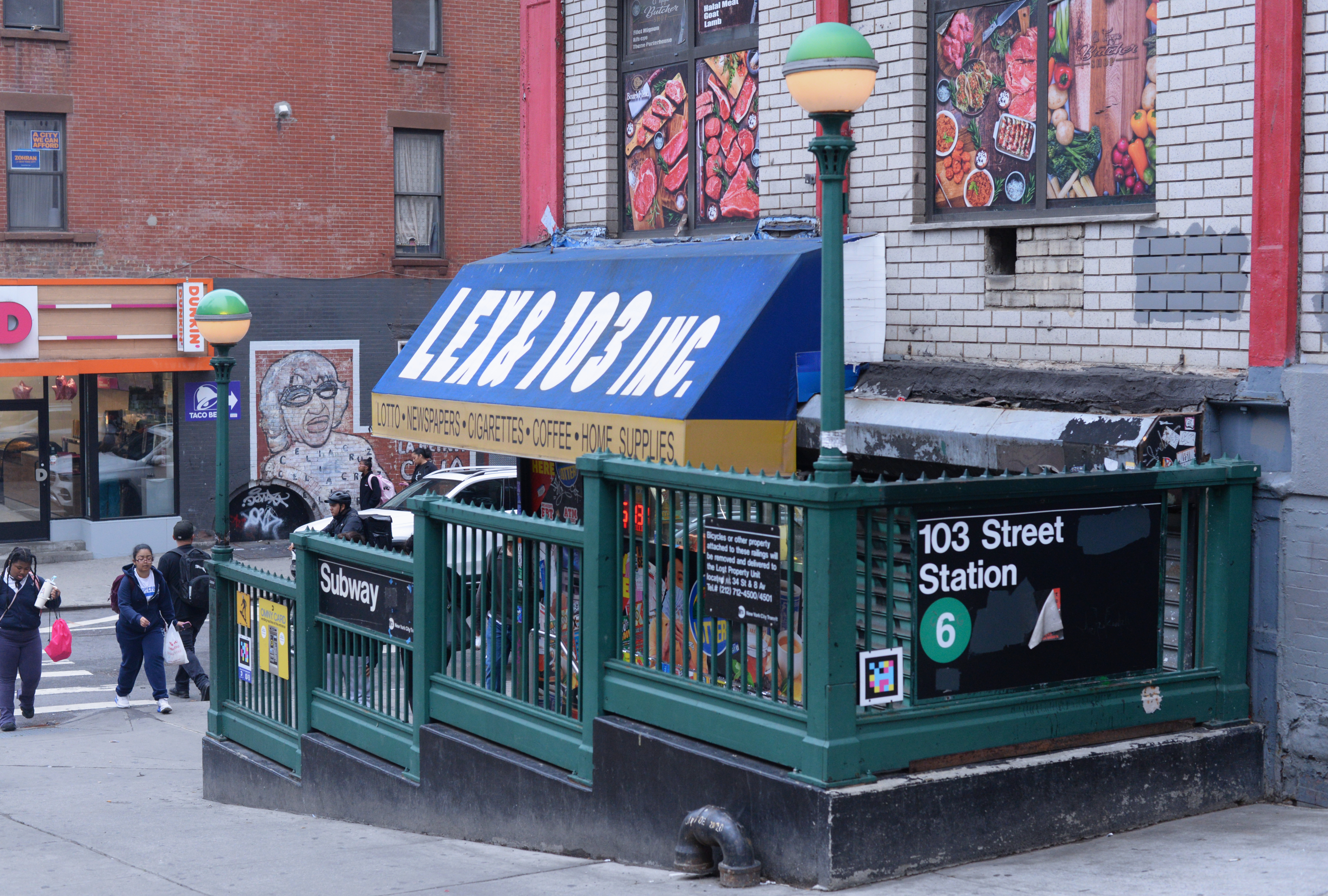
Stair entrance — note the staggered fences due to the steep incline

=== Exits ===
The station's only entrance/exit is a mezzanine above the platforms and tracks near the south end. It has two staircases from each platform, a waiting area that can be used as a crossover, turnstile bank, token booth, and two street stairs going up to the southeast and southwest corners of 103rd Street and Lexington Avenue. The mezzanine has mosaics indicating uptown and downtown directions. The fences surrounding each exit stairway are unusual as each section of the fence is at a different elevation, as they are located on Duffy's Hill, a sharp incline, on Lexington Avenue between 102nd and 103rd Streets.
