= 116th Street station (IRT Lexington Avenue Line) =

New York City Subway station in Manhattan

116 Street
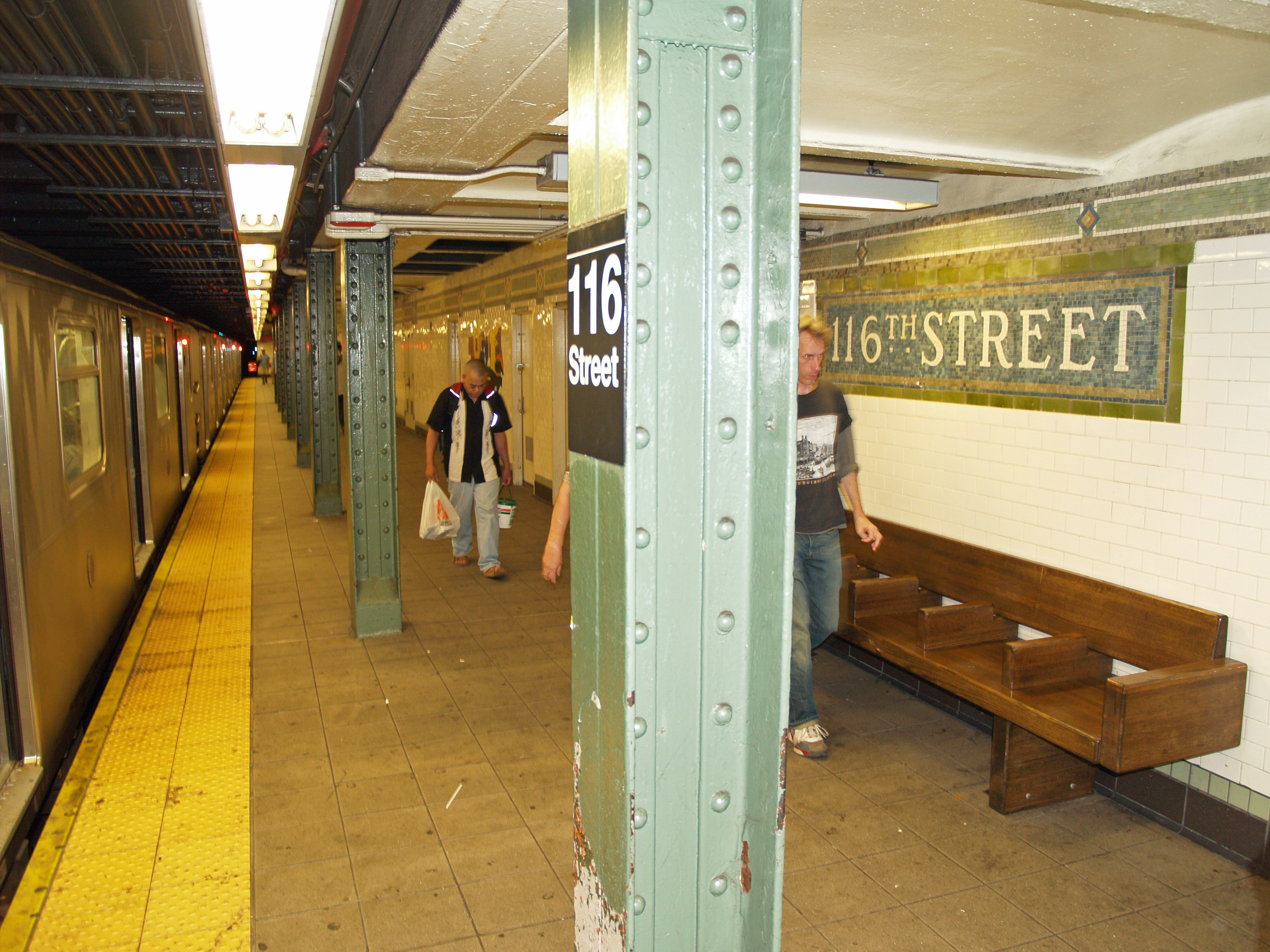
- Platform with train visible on the left

Station statistics
- Address: East 116th Street & Lexington Avenue; New York, New York
- Borough: Manhattan
- Locale: East Harlem
- Coordinates: 40.798607°N 73.942022°W
- Division: A (IRT)
- Line: IRT Lexington Avenue Line
- Services: 4 (late nights); 6 (all times) <6> (weekdays until 8:45 p.m., peak direction)
- Transit: NYCT Bus: M98, M101, M102, M103, M116
- Structure: Underground
- Platforms: 2 side platforms
- Tracks: 2

Other information
- Opened: July 17, 1918 (108 years ago)

Traffic
- 2025: 3,116,317 ▲13.8%
- Rank: 121 out of 423
Services
Preceding station	New York City Subway	Following station
125th Street 4 6 <6> toward Pelham Bay Park	Local	110th Street 4 6 <6> toward Brooklyn Bridge–City Hall
does not stop here
Location
Location within New York City Subway
Location within New York City
Location within New York
Track layout
Street map
Station service legend
Symbol	Description
Stops all times	Stops all times
Stops late nights only	Stops late nights only
Stops rush hours in the peak direction only	Stops rush hours in the peak direction only

The 116th Street station is a local station on the IRT Lexington Avenue Line of the New York City Subway. Located at the intersection of Lexington Avenue and 116th Street in East Harlem, it is served by the 6 train at all times, the <6> train during weekdays in the peak direction, and the 4 train during late nights.

This station was constructed as part of the Dual Contracts by the Interborough Rapid Transit Company and opened in 1918. It was renovated in 2003.

== History ==
=== Construction and opening ===
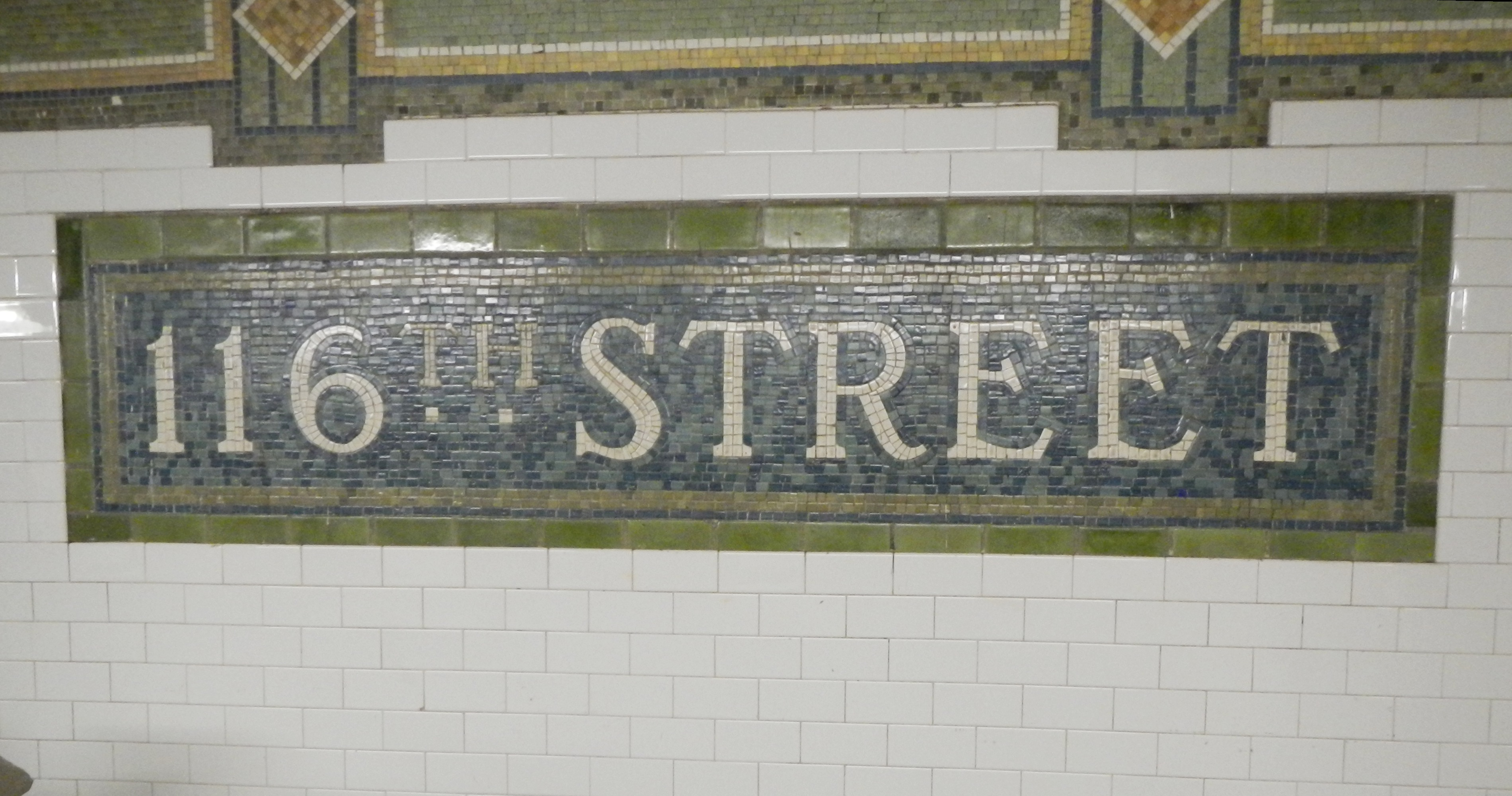
Station name in mosaics

Following the completion of the original subway, there were plans to construct a line along Manhattan's east side north of 42nd Street. The original plan for what became the extension north of 42nd Street was to continue it south through Irving Place and into what is now the BMT Broadway Line at Ninth Street and Broadway. In July 1911, the IRT had withdrawn from the talks, and the Brooklyn Rapid Transit Company (BRT) was to operate on Lexington Avenue. The IRT submitted an offer for what became its portion of the Dual Contracts on February 27, 1912.

In 1913, as part of the Dual Contracts, which were signed on March 19, 1913, the Public Service Commission planned to split the original Interborough Rapid Transit Company (IRT) system from looking like a "Z" system (as seen on a map) to an H-shaped system. The original system would be split into three segments: two north–south lines, carrying through trains over the Lexington Avenue and Broadway–Seventh Avenue Lines, and a west–east shuttle under 42nd Street. This would form a roughly H-shaped system. It was predicted that the subway extension would lead to the growth of the Upper East Side and the Bronx.

The 116th Street station opened on July 17, 1918, with service initially running between Grand Central–42nd Street and 167th Street via the line's local tracks. On August 1, the "H system" was put into place, with through service beginning on the new east and west side trunk lines, and the institution of the 42nd Street Shuttle along the old connection between the sides. The cost of the extension from Grand Central was $58 million.

=== Later years ===
The city government took over the IRT's operations on June 12, 1940.

This station was renovated in 2003, along with the 77th Street and 86th Street stations on the Lexington Avenue Line. As part of the project, structural deficiencies were repaired, signage and lighting were enhanced, electrical service was upgraded, station facilities were rehabilitated, new fare arrays and a new token booth were installed, and portions of the station were upgraded to be compliant with the Americans with Disabilities Act of 1990. In addition, visual clutter was eliminated, and artwork was installed. The contract for the station renovation project, which was expected to take two years, was expected to be advertised in October 2000. The contract for these three stations was awarded in October 2001, and the projects were done in-house. The cost of the work at 116th Street station was $15.5 million, of which $12.3 million came from the Federal government.

In 2026, as part of a pilot program to install vending machines across the New York City Subway system, a vending machine was installed within one of the station's unused retail spaces.

== Station layout ==
This underground station has two tracks and two side platforms, and serves local trains only. The two express tracks pass underneath on a lower level and are not visible from the platforms. The 6 stops here at all times, and the 4 stops here during late nights. The station is between 125th Street to the north and 110th Street to the south.

Fare control is at platform level, and no crossover or crossunder is provided. The station has standard IRT number and station name tiles. Both platforms have emergency exits from the lower level express tracks.

=== Exits ===
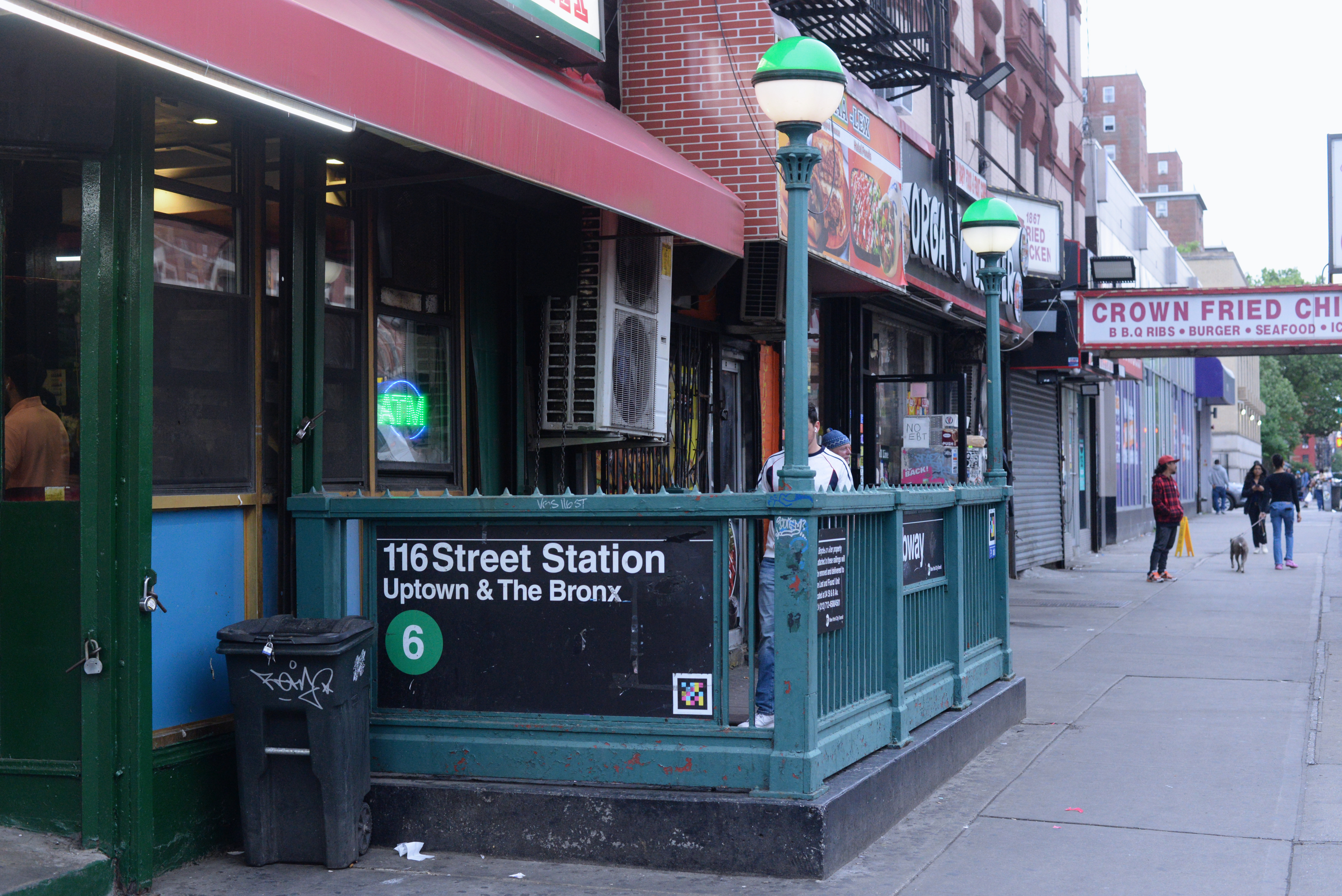
Uptown entrance

This station has staircases that lead out to the four corners of the intersection of 116th Street and Lexington Avenue. Staircases on the western corners serve the southbound platform, while those on the eastern corners serve the northbound platform. There are no crossovers or crossunders between the platforms that would allow free transfers between directions.
