= IRT Lexington Avenue Line =

New York City Subway line

- The 4, 5, 6, and 6 Express trains, which use the line through Midtown Manhattan, are colored green.

Overview
- Status: Operational
- Owner: City of New York
- Locale: Manhattan, New York City
- Termini: 125th Street; Bowling Green
- Stations: 23 in use (4 abandoned)

Service
- Type: Rapid transit
- System: New York City Subway
- Operator: New York City Transit Authority
- Daily ridership: 749,811

History
- Opened: October 27, 1904; 122 years ago
- Last extension: 1918

Technical
- Line length: 8.3 mi (13.4 km)
- Num of tracks: 2–4
- Character: Underground
- Track gauge: 4 ft 8 1/2 in (1,435 mm) standard gauge
- Electrification: Third rail, 625 V DC
Route map
| Express station | Local station | Closed station |

The IRT Lexington Avenue Line (also known as the IRT East Side Line and the IRT Lexington–Fourth Avenue Line) is one of the lines of the A Division of the New York City Subway, stretching from Lower Manhattan north to 125th Street in East Harlem. The line is served by the 4, 5, 6, and <6> trains.

The line was constructed in two main portions by the Interborough Rapid Transit Company (IRT), a private operator. The first portion, from City Hall north to 42nd Street, was opened between 1904 and 1908, and is part of the first subway line in the city. The original subway turned west across 42nd Street at the Grand Central station, then went north at Broadway, serving the present-day IRT Broadway–Seventh Avenue Line. The second portion of the line, north of 42nd Street, was constructed as part of the Dual Contracts, which were signed between the IRT; the Brooklyn Rapid Transit Company, via a subsidiary; and the City of New York.

For decades, the Lexington Avenue Line was the only line in Manhattan that directly served the Upper East Side and East Midtown; this four-track line is the most used rapid transit line in the United States. Its average of 1.3 million daily riders is more than the riderships of the transit systems of Chicago (772,900 weekday passengers), Boston (569,200 weekday passengers), and San Francisco (452,600 weekday passengers). The line spurred the construction of the parallel Second Avenue Subway, which opened in 2017, to relieve congestion on the Lexington Avenue line.

Four stations along this line have been abandoned. When platforms were lengthened to fit ten cars, it was deemed most beneficial to close these stations and open new entrances for adjacent stations. The 18th Street station was abandoned because of the proximity to both 14th Street–Union Square and 23rd Street. In addition, the City Hall and Worth Street stations were both very close to the Brooklyn Bridge–City Hall station's Brooklyn Bridge and Duane Street exits, respectively, so both were abandoned. Finally, South Ferry is within walking distance of Bowling Green, and is right next to the corresponding station on the Broadway–Seventh Avenue line.

== Extent and service ==
Services that use the Lexington Avenue Line are colored forest green. The following services use part or all of the line:

| | Time period | | | | Section of line |
| | Rush hours and middays | Evenings | Weekends | Late nights | Section of line |
|---|---|---|---|---|---|
| "4" train | express | | | local | full line |
| "5" train | express | | | no service | full line (weekdays till 8:45 p.m.) north of Bowling Green (late evenings and weekends) |
| "6" train | local | | | | north of Brooklyn Bridge–City Hall |
| "6" express train | local | no service | | | north of Brooklyn Bridge–City Hall |

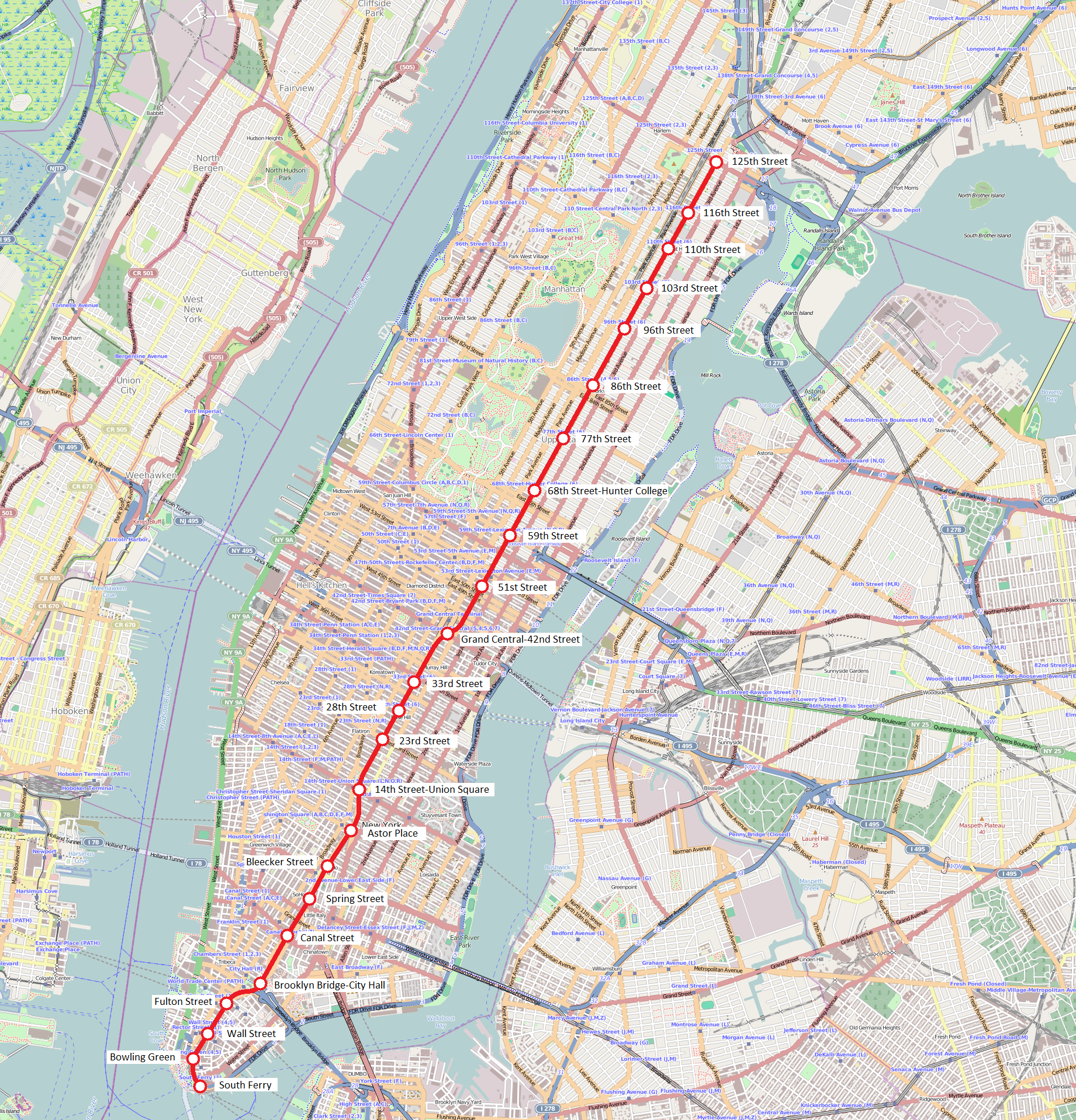
Overview of the IRT Lexington Avenue Line

The Lexington Avenue Line begins in lower Manhattan at the inner loop of the abandoned South Ferry station. North of the station is a merge with the tracks of the Joralemon Street Tunnel from Brooklyn, which become the express tracks. These run north under Broadway and Park Row to Centre Street. At the south end of Centre Street, directly under New York City Hall, is the City Hall Loop and its abandoned station, which was the southern terminus of the original IRT subway line. The loop is still used to turn 6 and <6> service; the Lexington Avenue local tracks, which feed the loop, rise up to join the express tracks just south of Brooklyn Bridge–City Hall station.

From Brooklyn Bridge, the line continues northward in a four-across track layout under Centre Street, Lafayette Street, Fourth Avenue, and Park Avenue South until 42nd Street. At this point, the beginning of Metro-North Railroad's Park Avenue tunnel in Grand Central Terminal forces the Lexington Avenue Line to shift slightly eastward to Lexington Avenue; its Grand Central–42nd Street station is located on the diagonal between Park and Lexington. Just south of Grand Central, a single non-revenue track connects the IRT 42nd Street Shuttle to the southbound local track; this was part of the original IRT subway alignment.

Under Lexington Avenue, the line assumes a two-over-two track configuration, with the local tracks running on the upper level and the express on the lower, although it briefly returns to a four-across layout between 96th Street and 116th Street. 125th Street returns to this two-over-two layout, although here the upper level is used by all northbound trains and the lower level by southbound trains. This is because Lexington Avenue is too narrow to have a four-across layout.

North of this, the line crosses under the Harlem River into the Bronx via the four-track Lexington Avenue Tunnel, where the line splits into the IRT Jerome Avenue Line on the western two tracks (4 and 5 trains) and the IRT Pelham Line on the eastern two tracks (6 and <6> trains).

== History ==
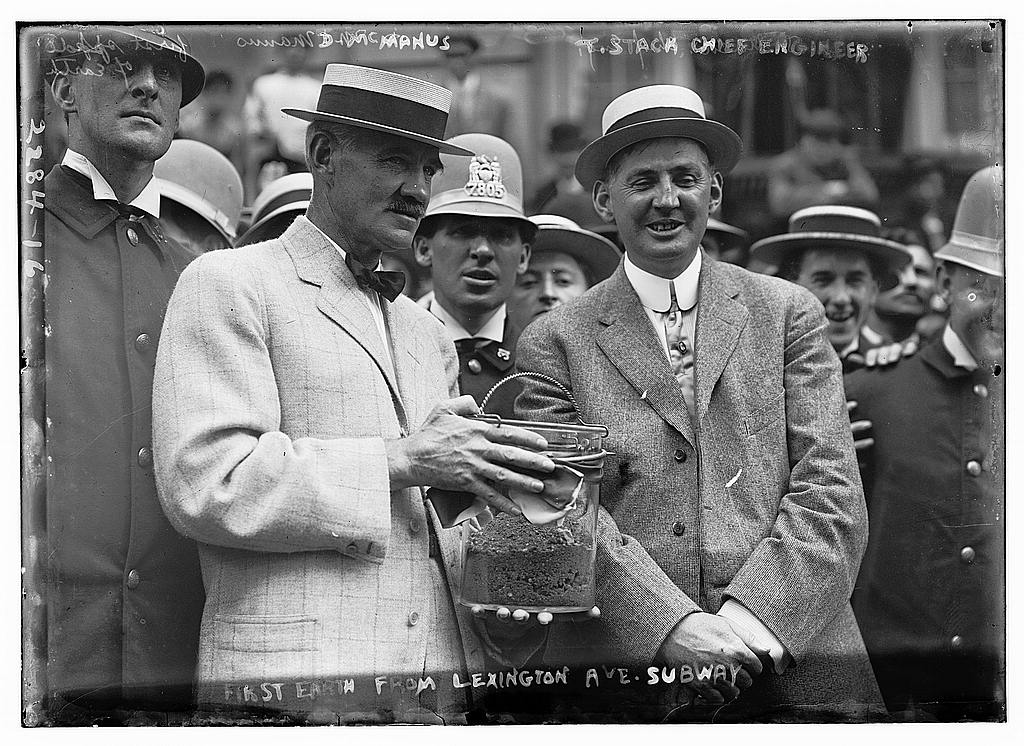
First earth from Lexington Avenue subway line in 1913

=== Original subway ===
Construction started on the first IRT line in 1900. A 1902 explosion during construction seriously damaged properties just above the line. The part of the line from City Hall to just south of 42nd Street was part of the original IRT line, opened on October 27, 1904. A 0.3 miles (0.48 km) extension to Fulton Street opened at 12:01 a.m. on January 16, 1905. Only the northbound platform opened at this time. The next station, Wall Street, was opened on June 12, 1905, as well as the southbound platform at Fulton Street.

The first revenue train on the South Ferry extension left South Ferry at 11:59 p.m. on July 9, 1905; the extension of the IRT White Plains Road Line to West Farms opened just after. The first train ran through the Joralemon Street Tunnel to Brooklyn about 12:45 a.m. on January 9, 1908.

=== Dual Contracts ===
The original plan for what became the extension north of 42nd Street was to continue it south through Irving Place and into what is now the BMT Broadway Line at Ninth Street and Broadway. Contracts awarded on July 21, 1911, included Section 6 between 26th Street and 40th Street; at the time, the IRT had withdrawn from the talks, and the Brooklyn Rapid Transit Company (BRT) was to operate on Lexington Avenue. The IRT submitted an offer for what became its portion of the Dual Contracts on February 27, 1912, and construction was soon halted on Section 6.

The construction of this line, in conjunction with the construction of the Broadway–Seventh Avenue Line, would change the operations of the IRT system. Instead of having trains go via Park Avenue, turning onto 42nd Street, before finally turning onto Broadway, there would be two trunk lines connected by the 42nd Street Shuttle. The system would be changed from looking like a "Z" system (as seen on a map) to an H-shaped system. One trunk would run via the new Lexington Avenue Line down Park Avenue, and the other trunk would run via the new Seventh Avenue Line up Broadway. It was predicted that the subway extension would lead to the growth of the Upper East Side and the Bronx.

The rest of the line, north to 125th Street, opened on July 17, 1918. However, until the evening of August 1, 1918, it ran as a shuttle on the local tracks only, terminating at 42nd Street and at 167th Street on the IRT Jerome Avenue Line (where the connection from the elevated IRT Ninth Avenue Line merged). On August 1, service patterns were changed, and the Lexington Avenue Line became a through route. The IRT Broadway–Seventh Avenue Line also switched from shuttle operation at that time, and the IRT 42nd Street Shuttle was formed along the old connection between the sides. Due to the shape of the system, it was referred to as the "H system". The first section of the IRT Pelham Line also opened to Third Avenue–138th Street on August 1, 1918. The cost of the extension from Grand Central was $58 million.

The construction and opening of the Lexington Avenue Line north of Grand Central resulted in the construction of expensive apartments along Park Avenue, Madison Avenue, and Lexington Avenue.

=== Improvements ===
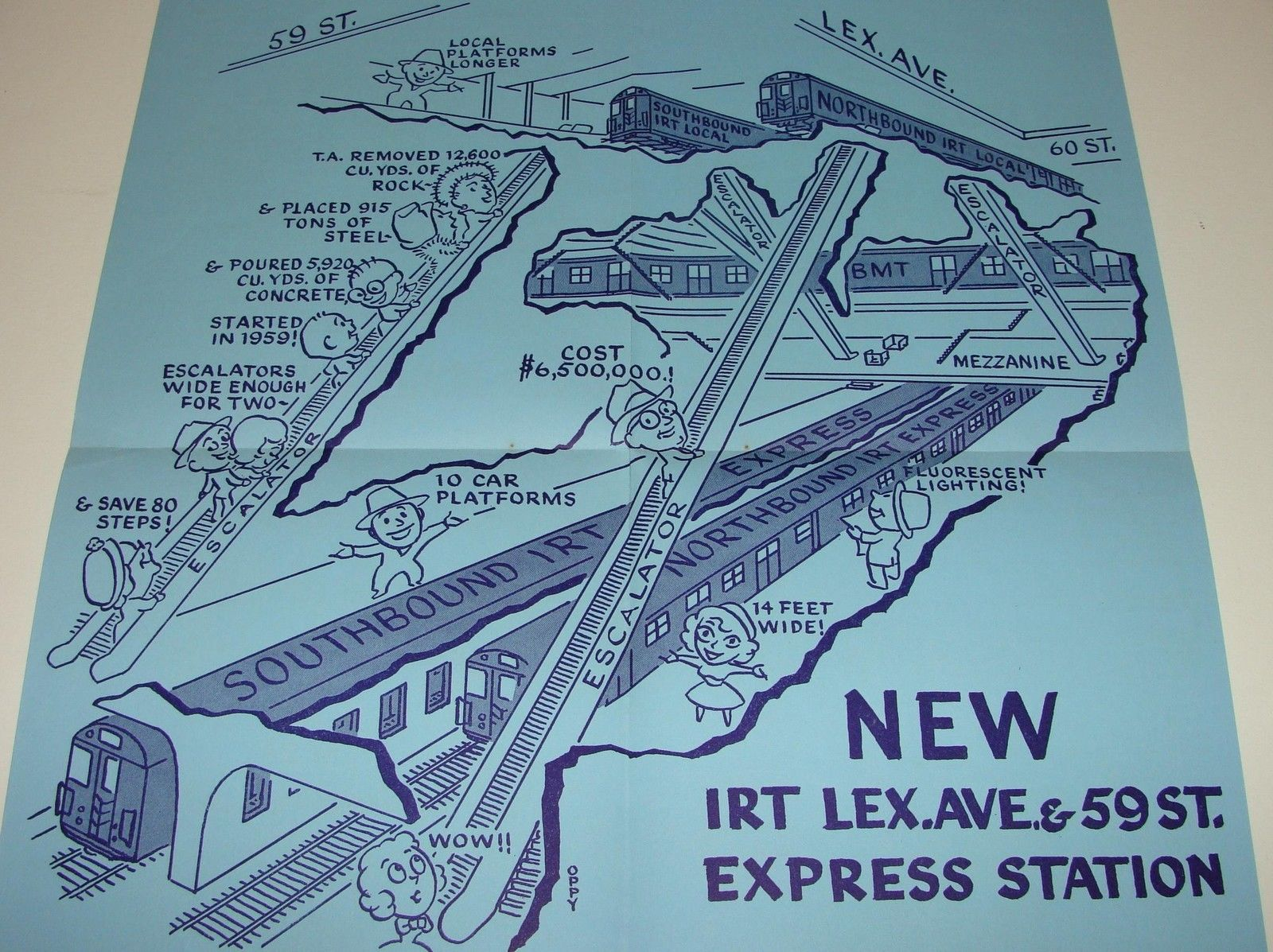
Brochure for the opening of the 59th Street express platforms

In 1928, the New York City Board of Transportation proposed to extend platforms at all stations between Brooklyn Bridge and Grand Central, except for 33rd Street.

On April 13, 1948, the platform extensions to accommodate ten-car trains at 23rd Street, 28th Street, and 33rd Street were opened for use. In 1949, the southbound platforms at Astor Place, Bleecker Street, Spring Street, Canal Street, and Worth Street were extended.

In 1957, the New York City Transit Authority started work on a $138 million modernization program for the Lexington Avenue Line to improve and speed up service. As part of the project, platforms on the line were extended, express platforms were built at 59th Street, additional entrances were constructed at some stations, and the line's signal system and interlockings were modernized.

Work on the reconstruction of the Brooklyn Bridge station started on May 18, 1959, and continued without interruption until it was completed on September 1, 1962. Prior to the rebuild, the station's local platform could only accommodate four cars, resulting in delays. The uptown platform's extension opened at this time (the downtown platform was lengthened in 1961) as the platforms were lengthened, widened, and straightened. Originally, the island platforms narrowed at their northern ends to an unsafe width of only five feet. The project remedied this situation, lengthening the platforms from 295 feet (90 m) to 523 feet (159 m) and widening them. The platforms were extended northward by 220 feet (67 m) to just south of Reade Street. In addition, a new exit was provided at Reade Street and Lafayette Street and a new passageway under Reade Street was built connecting to the Chambers Street station on the BMT Nassau Street Line. At the center of the enlarged platforms, a new overhead passage was built, providing more direct access to the Municipal Building. The platform extensions allowed the old platform extensions at the southern end of the station, which were used for express service, to be abandoned. These platform extensions had necessitated the use of gap fillers. This project cost $6 million, and allowed 6 trains to be lengthened to nine cars, and allowed express trains to open all doors at the station (previously the doors only opened in eight of the ten cars). Upon its completion, the Worth Street station to the north was closed due to its close proximity to the platform extensions, and, as such, the station was renamed Brooklyn Bridge–Worth Street.

In late 1959, contracts were awarded to extend the platforms at Bowling Green, Wall Street, Fulton Street, Canal Street, Spring Street, Bleecker Street, Astor Place, Grand Central, 86th Street and 125th Street to 525 feet (160 m) to accommodate ten-car trains. At the same time, work to modernize the signals and interlockings between Wall Street and 86th Street was underway. Another element of the modernization plan was the construction of a new station entrance and control building in Bowling Green Park at Bowling Green, with new stairways to the platform.

On July 23, 1959, the Board of Estimate approved the contract for the construction of express platforms at Lexington Avenue–59th Street. The new platforms were intended to reduce transfer congestion at Grand Central–42nd Street, and to allow transfers between the express trains and BMT trains to Queens. Even before the express platforms were added, this station was the busiest on the line. Construction for the express station began on August 10, 1959. The two express platforms were 14 feet (4.3 m) wide and 525 feet (160 m) long. Along with the new express platforms, a new mezzanine was built above it to connect it to the local station, and the Broadway Line station. Two high speed escalators were added to connect the local and express platforms. Two additional high speed escalators were built to connect the local platforms with the new mezzanine. As part of the plan, the local platforms were extended to accommodate 10-car trains. In addition, new entrances and booths were added to the 59th Street ends of the northbound and southbound sides. The project cost $6.5 million and was completed three months prior than originally planned when the new platforms opened on November 15, 1962.

In April 1960, work began on a $3,509,000 project to lengthen platforms on the line to accommodate ten-car trains at seven stations on the line. As part of the project, the northbound platforms at Canal Street, Spring Street, Bleecker Street, and Astor Place were lengthened from 225 feet (69 m) to 525 feet (160 m). The platform extensions at these four stops opened for service on February 19, 1962, enabling the doors of all eight cars of trains to open on the platform. Work was still underway at two of the other three stations part of the contract, Wall Street and Fulton Street, while work at Bowling Green was already completed. The entire platform-lengthening project was substantially completed by November 1965.

Because the Lexington Avenue Line during the 1970s was known to frequent muggers due to the dilapidated state of the subway at the time, the Guardian Angels, founded by Curtis Sliwa, began operations on February 13, 1979, by conducting unarmed night patrols on the 4 train in an effort to discourage crime. These patrols later expanded to other parts of the subway and to other city neighborhoods.

On August 28, 1991, an accident involving a 4 train on the express track just north of the 14th Street–Union Square station killed five riders and injured 215 others in the worst accident on the system since the 1928 Times Square derailment. As a result of the crash, new safety protocols were put in place and there was a partial implementation of automation of the New York City Subway.

The Metropolitan Transportation Authority announced in 2024 that it would begin installing 5G cellular equipment on the Lexington Avenue Line north of the Grand Central–42nd Street station in mid-2025. 5G service in the Joralemon Street Tunnel between Bowling Green and Borough Hall was activated in October 2025, and 5G in the tunnel between Fulton Street and Bowling Green was activated in March 2026.

== Overcrowding ==
The Second Avenue Elevated fully closed on June 13, 1942. Because of the elevated line's closure, as well as a corresponding increase in the East Side population, crowding on the Lexington Avenue Line increased. The Manhattan section of the Third Avenue Elevated, the only other elevated line in the area, closed on May 13, 1955, and was demolished in 1956.

Contrary to what many East Side residents thought, the demolition of the elevateds did not help the travel situation, as the Lexington Avenue Line was now the only subway transportation option on the East Side. As the elevated lines were torn down, hundreds of high-rise apartment buildings were built on the East Side, and the business districts along the line grew, resulting in overcrowding along the line. Both of these elevated lines were supposed to be replaced by a subway line under Second Avenue. However, it was not completed due to a lack of funds. With the city's economic and budgetary recovery in the 1990s, there was a revival of efforts to complete construction of the Second Avenue Subway. Once fully built, the line will run from 125th Street and Lexington Avenue to Hanover Square in the Financial District. Construction started in 2007, and on January 1, 2017, the first phase, between Lexington Avenue–63rd Street and 96th Street opened. Within a few months of the line's opening, crowding on the Lexington Avenue Line stations on the Upper East Side was somewhat reduced. East Side Access, completed in 2023, brought Long Island Rail Road service into Grand Central. With more people coming onto the East Side, increased crowding is expected on the Lexington Avenue Line, underscoring the need for the Second Avenue Subway.

Crowding on the line is so bad that riders are routinely stranded on the platform, having to wait for multiple trains to pass before being able to board. Trains on the line are at over 100% of capacity. In June and July 2017, The New York Times found that during an average weekday, 10% to 15% of the trains scheduled to run through Grand Central–42nd Street were canceled. This meant that during peak periods, up to 13 trains per hour could be canceled, resulting in 1,000 passengers being displaced for every canceled train. Train frequencies were also erratic, with higher frequencies on some days than on others.

On May 27, 2015, the New York City Council approved plans for a developer to build One Vanderbilt, a 65-story skyscraper. The MTA mandated that the developers pay for station improvements at Grand Central to allow for the building's construction. In 2015, SL Green, the developer, gave $220 million toward the building's construction, of which two-thirds of the money would be used for station redesign; this marked the largest private investment to date to the New York City Subway system. As part of the station construction, 40% of the basement of the Grand Hyatt New York would be destroyed in order to make room for the expansion of the subway mezzanine, as well as two new subway entrances in the One Vanderbilt building itself. The new building would also coincide with the MTA's East Side Access project, and station improvements due to One Vanderbilt's construction would provide extra capacity for over 65,000 new passengers going into the New York City Subway at Grand Central–42nd Street. The improvements include an underground connection between Grand Central Terminal and One Vanderbilt; new mezzanines and exits for the subway station; and three new stairways to each of the Lexington Avenue Line platforms. This would directly result in additional capacity for the subway station, with 4,000 to 6,000 more subway passengers per hour being able to use the station, allowing for one additional express train per hour. These improvements would cost over $200 million.

== Station listing ==
Station service legend
| Stops all times | Stops 24 hours a day |
| Stops all times except late nights | Stops every day during daytime hours only |
| Stops late nights only | Stops every day during overnight hours only |
| Stops weekdays during the day | Stops during weekday daytime hours only |
| Stops all times except rush hours in the peak direction | Stops 24 hours a day, except during weekday rush hours in the peak direction |
| Stops rush hours only | Stops during weekday rush hours only |
| Stops rush hours in the peak direction only | Stops during weekday rush hours in the peak direction only |
Time period details
| Disabled access | Station is compliant with the Americans with Disabilities Act |
| ↑ | Station is compliant with the Americans with Disabilities Act in the indicated direction only |
| ↓ | Station is compliant with the Americans with Disabilities Act in the indicated direction only |
| | Elevator access to mezzanine only |

| Neighborhood (approximate) | Disabled access | Station | Tracks | Services | Opened | Transfers and notes |
Begins as a merge of the IRT Jerome Avenue Line (4 5 ) and IRT Pelham Line (6 <6>)
Lexington Avenue Tunnel
| East Harlem | Disabled access | 125th Street | all | 4 5 6 <6> | July 17, 1918 | Connection to Metro-North Railroad at Harlem–125th Street; M60 Select Bus Service to LaGuardia Airport |
| East Harlem | | 116th Street | local | 4 6 <6> | July 17, 1918 | |
| East Harlem | | 110th Street | local | 4 6 <6> | July 17, 1918 | |
| East Harlem | | 103rd Street | local | 4 6 <6> | July 17, 1918 | |
| Upper East Side | | 96th Street | local | 4 6 <6> | July 17, 1918 | |
| Upper East Side | ↑ | 86th Street | all | 4 5 6 <6> | July 17, 1918 | M86 Select Bus Service; Station is ADA-accessible in the northbound direction for the local platform only. |
| Upper East Side | | 77th Street | local | 4 6 <6> | July 17, 1918 | M79 Select Bus Service |
| Upper East Side | Disabled access | 68th Street–Hunter College | local | 4 6 <6> | July 17, 1918 | |
| Midtown Manhattan | | 59th Street | all | 4 5 6 <6> | July 17, 1918 (1962, express) | N R W (BMT Broadway Line at Lexington Avenue–59th Street); Out-of-system transfer with MetroCard/OMNY: F M N Q R (63rd Street Lines at Lexington Avenue–63rd Street); Roosevelt Island Tramway; This station was originally a local station. The lower level for express trains was opened in 1962. |
| Midtown Manhattan | Disabled access | 51st Street | local | 4 6 <6> | July 17, 1918 | E F <F> (IND Queens Boulevard Line at Lexington Avenue–53rd Street) |
| Midtown Manhattan | Disabled access | Grand Central–42nd Street | all | 4 5 6 <6> | July 17, 1918 | 7 <7> (IRT Flushing Line); S (42nd Street Shuttle); Connection to Metro-North Railroad at Grand Central Terminal; Connection to Long Island Rail Road at Grand Central Madison |
| Midtown Manhattan | merge on southbound local track to IRT 42nd Street Line (no regular service) | | | | | |
| Murray Hill | | 33rd Street | local | 4 6 <6> | October 27, 1904 | M34/M34A Select Bus Service |
| Rose Hill | ↓ | 28th Street | local | 4 6 <6> | October 27, 1904 | Station is ADA-accessible in the southbound direction only. |
| Gramercy | Disabled access | 23rd Street–Baruch College | local | 4 6 <6> | October 27, 1904 | M23 Select Bus Service |
| Gramercy | | 18th Street | local | | October 27, 1904 | Closed November 7, 1948 |
| Union Square | Elevator access to mezzanine only | 14th Street–Union Square | all | 4 5 6 <6> | October 27, 1904 | L (BMT Canarsie Line); N Q R W (BMT Broadway Line); M14A / M14D Select Bus Service originally 14th Street |
| East Village | | Astor Place | local | 4 6 <6> | October 27, 1904 | |
| NoHo | Disabled access | Bleecker Street | local | 4 6 <6> | October 27, 1904 | B D F <F> M (IND Sixth Avenue Line at Broadway–Lafayette Street) |
| Little Italy | | Spring Street | local | 4 6 <6> | October 27, 1904 | Abandoned trackway exists between express tracks with a signal room on top of it |
| Chinatown | Disabled access | Canal Street | local | 4 6 <6> | October 27, 1904 | N R W (BMT Broadway–Main line); N Q (BMT Broadway–Manhattan Bridge line); J Z (BMT Nassau Street Line) |
| Civic Center | | Worth Street | local | | October 27, 1904 | Closed September 1, 1962 |
| Civic Center | Disabled access | Brooklyn Bridge–City Hall | all | 4 5 6 <6> | October 27, 1904 | J Z (BMT Nassau Street Line at Chambers Street) originally Brooklyn Bridge, then Brooklyn Bridge–Worth Street There were two side platforms that accommodated 5 car local trains. Also, there are closed platform extensions to the south. |
| Civic Center | local tracks leave the alignment of the express tracks; local trains short turn (6 <6>) via the loop | | | | | |
| Civic Center | | City Hall | loop | | October 27, 1904 | Closed December 31, 1945; currently used for local trains to short turn with no station stop. Lexington Avenue Line local trains stopped at station from 1904 to 1945 except late nights, when trains continued to South Ferry. |
| Civic Center | express trains continue (4 5 ) | | | | | |
| Financial District | Disabled access | Fulton Street | express | 4 5 | January 16, 1905 | A C (IND Eighth Avenue Line); J Z (BMT Nassau Street Line); 2 3 (IRT Broadway–Seventh Avenue Line); Connection to N R W at Cortlandt Street via Dey Street Passageway; Connection to PATH at World Trade Center |
| Financial District | | Wall Street | express | 4 5 | June 12, 1905 | |
| Financial District | Disabled access | Bowling Green | express | 4 5 | July 10, 1905 | M15 Select Bus Service; Staten Island Ferry at South Ferry |
Splits to Brooklyn via the Joralemon Street Tunnel (4 5 ) to become the IRT Eastern Parkway Line Express tracks
| Financial District | express train short turn (5 ) via both loops | | | | | |
| Financial District | | South Ferry | both loops | | July 10, 1905 | Inner platform closed February 12, 1977; currently used for express trains to short turn with no station stop. Lexington Avenue Line trains used the outer platform from July 10, 1905, to July 1, 1918, and from 1950 to February 12, 1977. The outer platform closed on March 16, 2009; which allows Lexington Avenue Line trains to again use both loop tracks. |
