= 4 (New York City Subway service) =

Rapid transit service

- Lexington Avenue Express

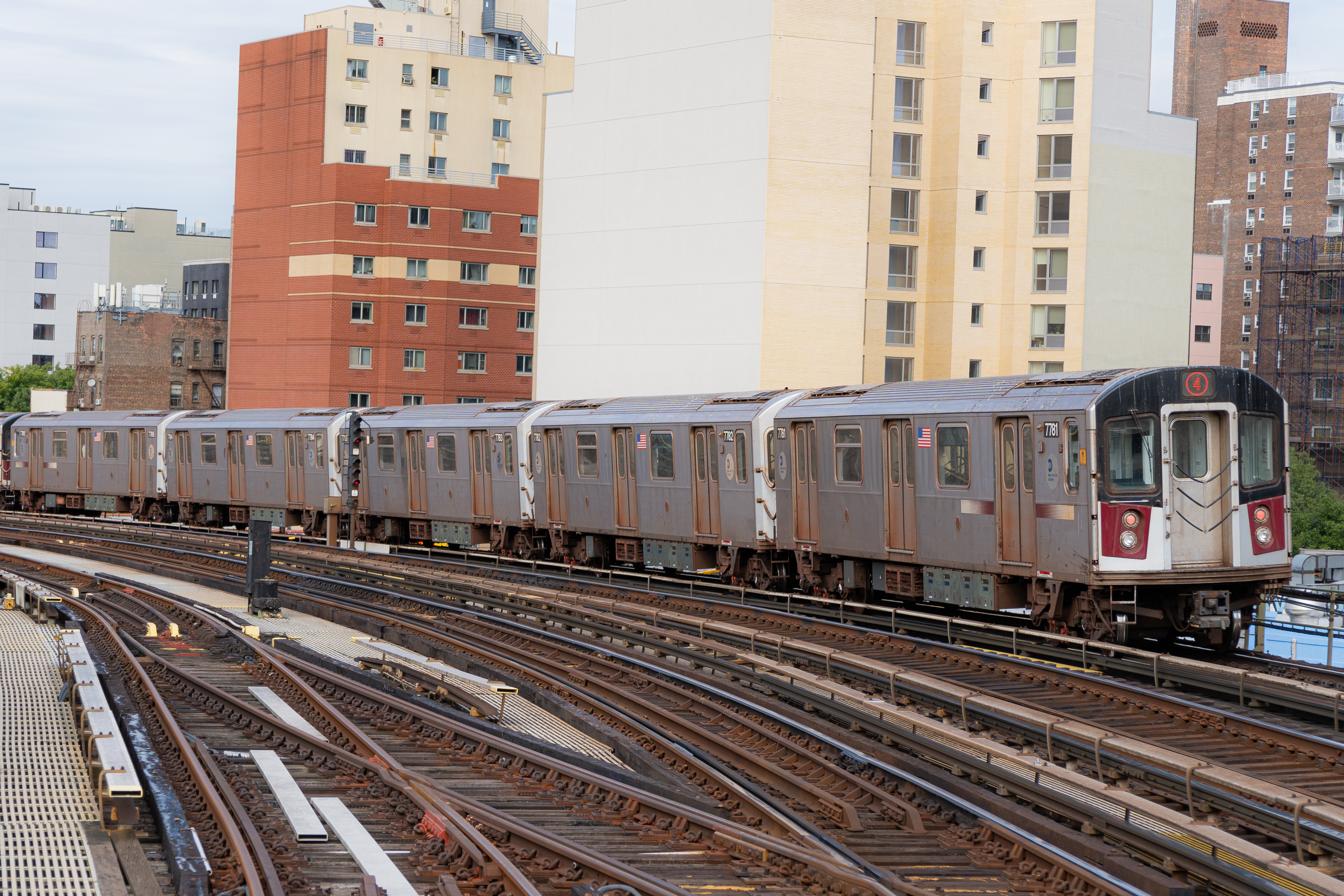
- A Woodlawn-bound 4 train of R142As leaving Bedford Park Boulevard–Lehman College.

- Note: dashed line shows late night and limited weekday rush hour service to/from New Lots Avenue
- Northern end: Woodlawn
- Southern end: Crown Heights–Utica Avenue (daytime); New Lots Avenue (late nights & limited rush hour service)
- Stations: 28; 54 (late night service)
- Rolling stock: R142; R142A (Rolling stock assignments subject to change)
- Depot: Jerome Yard
- Started service: June 2, 1917; 109 years ago

The 4 Lexington Avenue Express is a rapid transit service in the A Division of the New York City Subway. Its route emblem, or "bullet", is colored forest green since it uses the IRT Lexington Avenue Line in Manhattan.

The 4 operates 24 hours daily, although service patterns vary based on the time of day. Daytime service operates between Woodlawn in the Bronx and Utica Avenue in Crown Heights, Brooklyn, making all stops in the Bronx and express stops in Manhattan and Brooklyn; limited rush hour service, as well as overnight service, is extended seven stops beyond Utica Avenue and originates and terminates at New Lots Avenue in East New York, Brooklyn. During rush hours in the peak direction, the 4 skips 138th Street–Grand Concourse. (Note: Trains skip 138th Street southbound between 6:52 and 9 a.m. and skip it northbound between 4:46 and 6:27 p.m.) Overnight service makes all stops along the full route, but skips Hoyt Street in both directions. For up to an hour after evening events that are held at Yankee Stadium, a special downtown-only express service runs between 161st Street–Yankee Stadium and Bowling Green.

Until 1983, rush hour 4 trains originated and terminated at Flatbush Avenue–Brooklyn College in Brooklyn.

== Service history ==
=== Under the Interborough Rapid Transit ===
Service on what was later known as the 4 began on June 2, 1917, as the first portion of the IRT Jerome Avenue Line opened between 149th Street-Grand Concourse and Kingsbridge Road. Since the extension of the IRT Lexington Avenue Line between 149th Street and Grand Central was not yet open, this section was served by shuttle trains using elevated train cars. On April 15, 1918, with the extension of the Jerome Avenue Line to Woodlawn, shuttle service was also extended. On July 17, 1918, the Lexington Avenue Line local tracks were opened, allowing another shuttle service to run between 149th Street–Grand Concourse and Grand Central. On August 1, 1918, the entire Jerome and Lexington Avenue Lines were completed and the connection to the IRT Broadway–Seventh Avenue Line at 42nd Street was removed. Trains began running between 167th Street and Bowling Green, with shuttles to Woodlawn.

On December 11, 1921, Lexington Avenue–Jerome Avenue subway trains began running north of 167th Street at all times replacing elevated trains, which ran to Woodlawn during rush hours, but from then on terminated at 167th Street during non-rush hours.

At a hearing of the New York State Transit Commission on October 15, 1924, about where it planned to allocate the second 100 of 350 new steel cars, it was announced that service on the IRT Eastern Parkway Line from Atlantic Avenue to Livonia Avenue was almost certainly going to be increased by 25 to 50% in the coming six to eight weeks. Two options were discussed at the hearing. The commission, in response to intense requests from riders on the line, called for the introduction of express service between Atlantic Avenue and Utica Avenue on tracks which had been unused since the line's opening in 1920. It proposed extending half of 4 trains from Atlantic Avenue to New Lots Avenue, running express to Utica Avenue. The introduction of express service would have made it possible to run 30 more trains per hour east of Atlantic Avenue (27 trains per hour had been operating), decreasing overcrowding from 325% to 185%. The plan preferred by the IRT was to place 70 cars on the West Side Line for service to Flatbush Avenue, and Pennsylvania Avenue and New Lots Avenue, and 40 additional cars for service along Eastern Parkway.

On November 17, 1924, the Transit Commission ordered the IRT to use 100 new subway cars to increase service by no later than December 1. Among the changes in service ordered was the operation of through service on the 4 between Kingsbridge Road and Woodlawn, eliminating shuttle service. This change was made possible by twenty of the new cars. The Transit Commission heeded the IRT's recommendation not to have half of 4 trains run express due to the dangerous operating condition it would have created. The IRT stated that two minutes would not be enough time to turn around trains terminating at Atlantic Avenue while maintaining the headway between trains and that this service pattern would risk train collisions. Operating this service pattern would have required 2 3/4 minutes to turn around trains, which would reduce capacity by 25%. While operating all 4 trains to Utica Avenue would have obviated the problem, the IRT did not have enough cars to run such a service. Instead, the Transit Commission accepted the IRT's plan to allocate 70 new cars to West Side express service to Brooklyn. Express service along Eastern Parkway would start at the earliest in February 1925 when additional new cars arrived.

Beginning on November 4, 1925, 4 trains were extended from Atlantic Avenue to Utica Avenue during rush hours, from 6:30 to 9:30 a.m. and 5 to 7 p.m., allowing for the introduction of express service along this section of the IRT Eastern Parkway Line. This extension was made possible by the delivery of the last of 350 new steel cars. The increased service required 80 cars, or eight trains of ten cars each.

On November 23, 1927, evening 4 service was extended from Atlantic Avenue to Utica Avenue between 7:14 and 8:00 p.m. After the Transit Commission determined that this was not a sufficient increase in service, it announced on November 26 that evening 4 service to Utica Avenue would continue until 1 a.m. This change took place on December 5, and increased service between Atlantic Avenue and Utica Avenue by 100%. The following year, midday 4 service also went to Utica Avenue.

In April 1930, service was increased from running every 6 minutes to every 5 minutes heading southbound at 125th Street between 6 and 8 p.m. and from running every 8 minutes to every 6 minutes northbound at 125th Street between 7:30 and 9:00 p.m. In addition, trains that had formerly terminated at South Ferry from 7:26 p.m. to 8:44 p.m. were extended to Utica Avenue.

The span of Sunday express service from Utica Avenue was extended by 54 minutes on February 22, 1931, with express service beginning at 12:56 p.m. instead of 1:50 p.m. Effective April 13, 1931, trains that terminated at Atlantic Avenue between 12:45 and 2:45 a.m. on Mondays were extended to Utica Avenue to reduce a transfer for riders at Nevins Street and to provide service from Manhattan's East Side to Utica Avenue every ten minutes. On July 12, 1931, Sunday late night trains that terminated at Atlantic Avenue until 2:40 a.m. were extended to Utica Avenue.

As of 1934, 4 trains ran from Woodlawn to Utica Avenue weekday rush and Saturday morning peak and afternoon; to Atlantic Avenue weekday midday, Saturday morning after the peak, and late nights; and to South Ferry evenings and Sundays. Trains ran express in Manhattan, except during late nights, and in Brooklyn. This was the first time the 6 became the Pelham Shuttle between Pelham Bay Park and 125th Street–Lexington Avenue.

On August 20, 1938, Saturday morning after peak service was extended to Utica Avenue.

=== Under the New York City Board of Transportation ===
Beginning on May 10, 1946, all 4 trains were made express during late nights running on twelve-minute headways as the 6 went back to Brooklyn Bridge during that time. Previously 4 trains ran local from 12:30 to 5:30 a.m. At this time 4 trains terminated at Atlantic Avenue.

Beginning on December 16, 1946, trains were extended from Atlantic Avenue to New Lots Avenue during late nights, running express between Atlantic and Franklin Avenues.

The IRT routes were given numbered designations with the introduction of "R-type" rolling stock, which contained rollsign curtains with numbered designations for each service. The first such fleet, the R12, was put into service in 1948. The Lexington–Jerome route became known as the 4.

During 1950, Saturday morning service was cut back to South Ferry.

Starting on December 15, 1950, four 4 trains began operating during rush hours in the peak direction to and from Flatbush Avenue on the Nostrand Avenue Line, with the four trains in the AM rush hour leaving every 16 minutes between 7:59 and 8:47 a.m., and the four trains in the PM rush hour arriving every 16–20 minutes between 5:20 and 6:13 p.m. Also on that day, weekday midday service was cut back from Atlantic Avenue to South Ferry. Additionally, on January 18, 1952, 4 service to Atlantic Avenue during weekday middays was restored.

=== Under the New York City Transit Authority ===
On March 19, 1954, late-night service in Brooklyn became local, but resumed operating express between Atlantic and Franklin Avenues on June 29, 1956.

On May 3, 1957, the weekday rush trains to Flatbush Avenue were discontinued, while at the same time evening, Saturday, and Sunday afternoon trains were extended to Utica Avenue, while Sunday morning trains were extended to Atlantic Avenue.

Starting on March 1, 1960, late-night 4 trains resumed making all stops in Manhattan; this was the first time the 4 and 6 ran local in Manhattan together late nights. This arrangement ended on October 17, 1965, when the 4 went back express in Manhattan late nights.

Beginning on April 8, 1960, nearly all morning rush hour 4 trains ran to Flatbush Avenue, and evening rush hour 4 trains alternated between Flatbush and Utica Avenues. During weekday evenings and late nights 4 trains also went to Flatbush Avenue, making all stops in Brooklyn. On November 14, 1966, three trains that terminated at Utica Avenue were rerouted to terminate at Flatbush Avenue.

As a result of the opening of the main portion of the Chrystie Street Connection along the Manhattan Bridge on November 26, 1967, the 4 train was color-coded magenta under the first color scheme. The color coding of lines was introduced as a matter of having a universal system of signage and nomenclature.

By 1972, the 4 began to skip 138th Street weekdays during rush hours in the peak direction which it continues to do (mornings to Manhattan and evenings from there). At that time, the 4 went to Atlantic Avenue at all times but was extended to Utica Avenue rush hours running express in Brooklyn along Eastern Parkway. Select 4 trains also ran to Flatbush Avenue rush hours as well running express between Atlantic and Franklin Avenues, and late-night service made all stops in Brooklyn to Flatbush Avenue.

On May 23, 1976, Sunday morning trains were extended to Utica Avenue, running express in Brooklyn.

Effective June 1979, the 4 train assumed its current line color of forest green as a result of a nomenclature update to assign colors to a trunk line, plus line colors not serving Manhattan.

Beginning on January 13, 1980, all 4 trains resumed operating local in Manhattan during late night hours to replace the 6, which again became the Pelham Shuttle between 125th Street and Pelham Bay Park. This service cut affected 15,000 riders and was criticized by Manhattan Borough President Andrew Stein as no public hearing was held.

On July 10, 1983, rush hour 4 trains were rerouted from Flatbush Avenue to Utica Avenue, and late evening and late night and Sunday morning service was rerouted from Flatbush Avenue to New Lots Avenue, making all local stops.

On August 29, 1988, weekday midday 4 trains were extended from Atlantic Avenue to Utica Avenue, made possible by the termination of 5 service at Bowling Green. In addition, service was increased 50% during evenings between 8 p.m. and midnight, on Saturday afternoon, and on Sunday between 10 a.m. and 7 p.m. In January 1989, during middays, southbound service resumed operating express between Franklin Avenue and Utica Avenue following the elimination of 5 train layups.

Late night express service was reinstated from January 21, 1990, to October 5 of that year, as a result of the 6 being extended back to Brooklyn Bridge during that time. While late night 6 service to Brooklyn Bridge was permanently restored on October 3, 1999, the 4 continued to run local at those times, providing Lexington Avenue local stations service every ten minutes.

In January 1991, a reduction of service along the Eastern Parkway corridor to remove excess capacity was proposed. Weekend daytime 4 service would be extended beyond its terminal at Utica Avenue and originate and terminate at New Lots Avenue. Trains would operate local in Brooklyn south of Franklin Avenue. This service change would have been implemented in July 1991, pending approval from the MTA board.

=== 2000–present ===
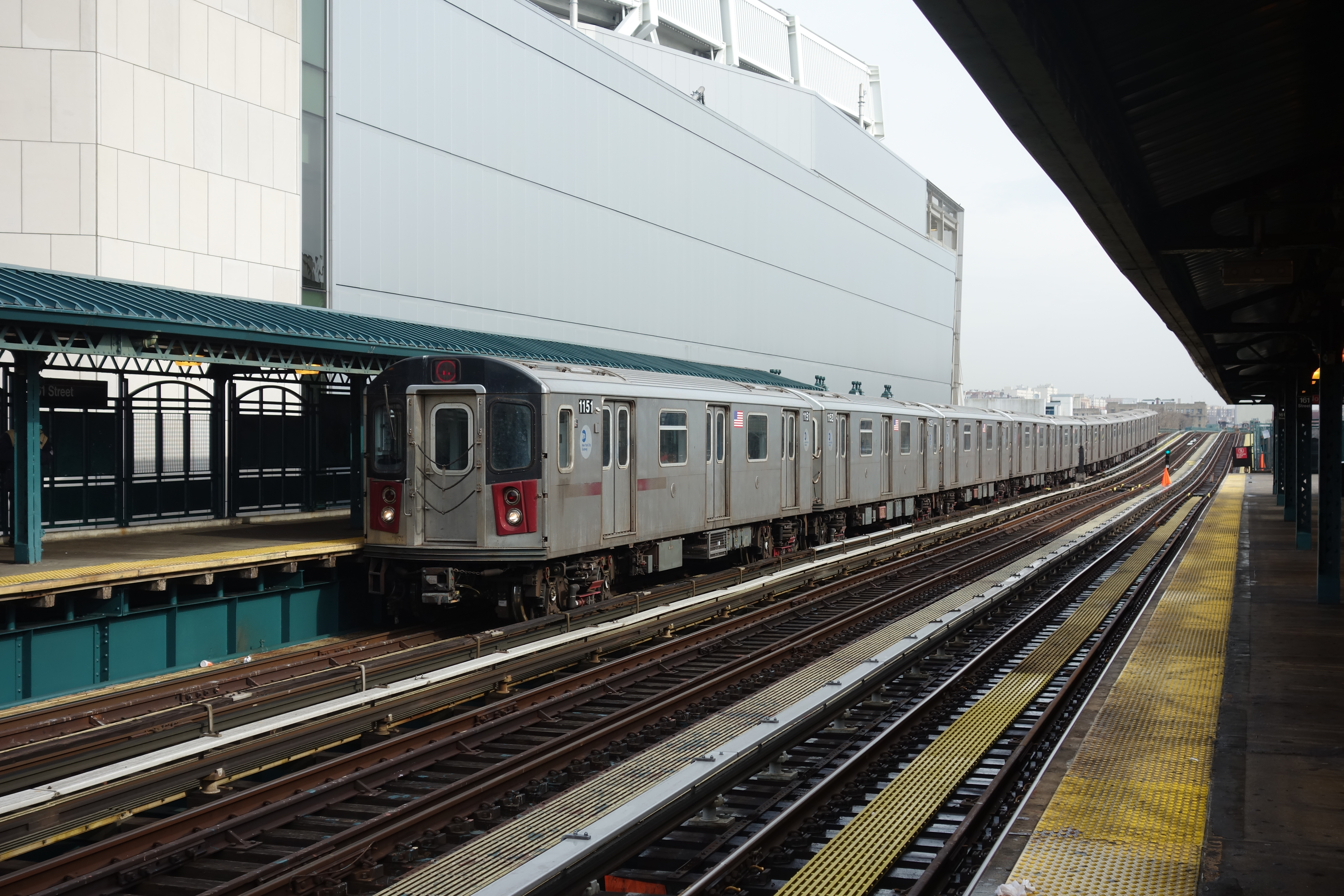
Manhattan-bound 4 train of R142s entering 161st Street–Yankee Stadium

From April 2000 to August 2001, midday 4 service was temporarily cut back from Utica Avenue to Atlantic Avenue to accommodate the rebuilding of the IRT New Lots Line. 3 train service was split into two sections to allow for the line to be rebuilt, with transfers available at Utica Avenue. Work took place on weekday middays between 10 a.m. and 3 p.m., and New Lots service operated in one of three ways: shuttle buses replaced trains, all trains operated in both directions on a single track, or shuttle trains ran. 4 trains terminated at Atlantic Avenue when shuttle or single-track trains were in operation.

After the September 11, 2001 attacks, 4 service was initially split in two sections, with the northern section operating between Woodlawn and Grand Central–42nd Street or Brooklyn Bridge and the southern section operating between Atlantic Avenue and New Lots Avenue. There was no southbound service between Grand Central and Brooklyn Bridge, which meant southbound trains discharged at Grand Central, operated out of service to Brooklyn Bridge, and re-entered service at Brooklyn Bridge in the northbound direction. By the evening of September 12, service was restored along the full route, but trains skipped 14th Street–Union Square in both directions. By September 17, trains were only skipping Wall Street, which reopened on the evening of September 19.

From June 8 to June 26, 2009, New York City Transit conducted a pilot program for express Jerome Avenue Line service. During a one hour period, four morning weekday rush hour trains from Woodlawn only stopped at Mosholu Parkway, Burnside Avenue and 149th Street–Grand Concourse before resuming regular service in Manhattan and Brooklyn. The express was expected to save riders 3 1/2 minutes. The pilot was made possible due to signaling upgrades to the line's center track made as part of the 2005–2009 Metropolitan Transportation Authority Capital Program.

On July 6, 2009, select Bronx-bound 4 trains began running express from 167th Street to Burnside Avenue to terminate at the latter station before running out of service to the Jerome Yard.

On October 26, 2009, another 4 express pilot program was implemented based on the success of the first and ran until December 11, 2009. This program was the same as the one in June except that express trains stopped at Bedford Park Boulevard–Lehman College. This express service was expected to cut runtime by 4 minutes.

As a result of planned repairs to Hurricane Sandy-related damage in the Clark Street Tube, which carries the IRT Broadway–Seventh Avenue Line, the 4 was extended to New Lots Avenue on weekends from June 17, 2017, to June 24, 2018, making local stops in Brooklyn south of Nevins Street in place of the 3.

On November 17, 2019, New York City Transit made adjustments to weekday evening 3, 4, and 5 service in order to accommodate planned subway work. Late night 4 service to New Lots Avenue started an hour earlier, at 10:30 p.m. instead of 11:30 p.m., replacing 3 service, which was cut back to Times Square–42nd Street. This change, which was approved by the MTA Board on June 27, 2019, was expected to save the agency $900,000 annually.

From March 2, 2026 until September 2026, northbound 4 trains are bypassing Burnside Avenue to facilitate the installation of an ADA-accessible elevator. The rush hour 4 trains terminating at the station are ending at 149th Street-Hostos, bypassing 138th Street-Grand Concourse.

== Route ==
=== Signage history ===
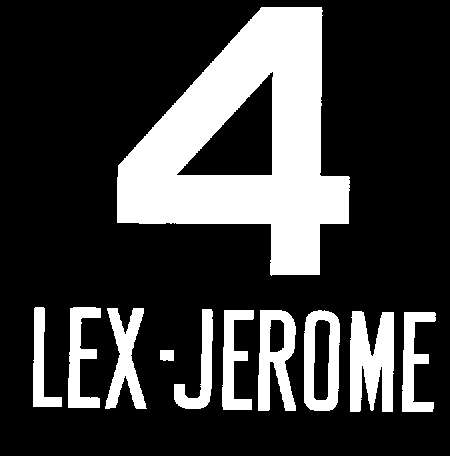
Pre-1967 bullet used on the R12s to R36s

1967–1979 bullet

Unused diamond 4 bullet from 1983, present in R62s

Bullet used since 1979

=== Service pattern ===
The following table shows the lines used by the 4, with shaded boxes indicating the route at the specified times:

Line	From	To	Tracks	Times		
Line	From	To	Tracks	all ex. nights	late nights	rush hours
IRT Jerome Avenue Line (full line)	Woodlawn	183rd Street	local			Most trains
IRT Jerome Avenue Line (full line)	Burnside Avenue	170th Street	local			Most trains
IRT Jerome Avenue Line (full line)	Burnside Avenue	170th Street	express			Limited service (NB only) (temporarily ending at 149 St due to station work).
IRT Jerome Avenue Line (full line)	167th Street	149th Street–Hostos	local			
IRT Jerome Avenue Line (full line)	138th Street–Grand Concourse		local			
IRT Jerome Avenue Line (full line)	138th Street–Grand Concourse		express			
IRT Lexington Avenue Line (full line)	125th Street	Brooklyn Bridge–City Hall	express		Special events (SB only)	
IRT Lexington Avenue Line (full line)	125th Street	Brooklyn Bridge–City Hall	local			
IRT Lexington Avenue Line (full line)	Fulton Street	Bowling Green	all			
Joralemon Street Tunnel			all			
IRT Eastern Parkway Line (full line)	Borough Hall	Nevins Street	express			
IRT Eastern Parkway Line (full line)	Atlantic Avenue–Barclays Center	Crown Heights–Utica Avenue	express			Most trains
IRT Eastern Parkway Line (full line)	Atlantic Avenue–Barclays Center	Crown Heights–Utica Avenue	local			Very limited service
IRT New Lots Line (full line)	Sutter Avenue–Rutland Road	New Lots Avenue	all			Limited service

=== Stations ===
For a more detailed station listing, see the articles on the lines listed above.

Station service legend
Stops all times	Stops 24 hours a day
Stops all times except late nights	Stops every day during daytime hours only
Stops late nights only	Stops every day during overnight hours only
Stops weekdays during the day	Stops during weekday daytime hours only
Stops all times except rush hours in the peak direction	Stops 24 hours a day, except during weekday rush hours in the peak direction
Stops rush hours in the peak direction only	Stops during weekday rush hours in the peak direction only
Stops rush hours only	Stops rush hours only (limited service)
Stops rush hours in the reverse-peak direction only	Stops rush hours in the reverse-peak direction only (limited service)
Time period details
Disabled access	Station is compliant with the Americans with Disabilities Act
↑	Station is compliant with the Americans with Disabilities Act in the indicated direction only
↓	Station is compliant with the Americans with Disabilities Act in the indicated direction only
	Elevator access to mezzanine only

Wood		Burn	161	Stations	Disabled access	Subway transfers	Connections/Notes
The Bronx
Jerome Avenue Line
Stops all times		—N/a	—N/a	Woodlawn			
Stops all times		—N/a	—N/a	Mosholu Parkway	Disabled access		
Stops all times		—N/a	—N/a	Bedford Park Boulevard–Lehman College			Some southbound rush hour trips begin at this station Some northbound p.m. rush hour trips terminate at this station
Stops all times		—N/a	—N/a	Kingsbridge Road			Some southbound p.m. rush hour trips begin at this station
Stops all times		—N/a	—N/a	Fordham Road	Disabled access		Bx12 Select Bus Service
Stops all times		—N/a	—N/a	183rd Street			
Stops all times		Stops rush hours only (limited service)	—N/a	Burnside Avenue			Station bypassed in the northbound direction due to station improvements
Stops all times		↑	—N/a	176th Street			
Stops all times		↑	—N/a	Mount Eden Avenue			
Stops all times		↑	—N/a	170th Street	Disabled access		
Stops all times		Stops rush hours only (limited service)	—N/a	167th Street			
Stops all times		Stops rush hours only (limited service)	Stops late nights only	161st Street–Yankee Stadium	Disabled access	B D (IND Concourse Line)	Bx6 Select Bus Service; Metro-North Hudson Line at Yankees–East 153rd Street; Northern terminus of southbound-only special event express service
Stops all times		Stops rush hours only (limited service)	Stops late nights only	149th Street–Hostos	Disabled access	2 5 (IRT White Plains Road Line)	Northern terminal for some rush hour trips
Stops all times except rush hours in the peak direction		Stops rush hours only (limited service)	Stops late nights only	138th Street–Grand Concourse		5	
Manhattan
Lexington Avenue Line
Stops all times		Stops rush hours only (limited service)	Stops late nights only	125th Street	Disabled access	5 6 <6>	Metro-North Railroad at Harlem–125th Street; M60 Select Bus Service to LaGuardia Airport
Stops late nights only		↑	↓	116th Street		6	
Stops late nights only		↑	↓	110th Street		6	
Stops late nights only		↑	↓	103rd Street		6	
Stops late nights only		↑	↓	96th Street		6	
Stops all times		Stops rush hours only (limited service)	Stops late nights only	86th Street	↑ (Note: Only the northbound local platform, served only during late nights, is accessible.)	5 6 <6>	M86 Select Bus Service; Station is ADA-accessible in the northbound direction for the local platform only.
Stops late nights only		↑	↓	77th Street		6	M79 Select Bus Service
Stops late nights only		↑	↓	68th Street–Hunter College	Disabled access	6	
Stops all times		Stops rush hours only (limited service)	Stops late nights only	59th Street		5 6 <6> N R W (BMT Broadway Line at Lexington Avenue/59th Street); Out-of-system transfer with MetroCard/OMNY: F M N Q R (63rd Street Lines at Lexington Avenue–63rd Street)	Roosevelt Island Tramway
Stops late nights only		↑	↓	51st Street	Disabled access	6 E (IND Queens Boulevard Line at Lexington Avenue–53rd Street)	
Stops all times		Stops rush hours only (limited service)	Stops late nights only	Grand Central–42nd Street	Disabled access	5 6 <6> 7 <7> (IRT Flushing Line); S (42nd Street Shuttle)	Metro-North Railroad at Grand Central Terminal; Long Island Rail Road at Grand Central Madison
Stops late nights only		↑	↓	33rd Street		6	M34 / M34A Select Bus Service; NYC Ferry: Astoria and Soundview Routes (on FDR Drive and East 34th Street)
Stops late nights only		↑	↓	28th Street	↓	6	Station is ADA-accessible in the southbound direction only.
Stops late nights only		↑	↓	23rd Street–Baruch College	Disabled access	6	M23 Select Bus Service; NYC Ferry: Soundview Route (on FDR Drive/Avenue C and East 20th Street)
Stops all times		Stops rush hours only (limited service)	Stops late nights only	14th Street–Union Square	Elevator access to mezzanine only	5 6 <6> L (BMT Canarsie Line); N Q R W (BMT Broadway Line)	M14A / M14D Select Bus Service
Stops late nights only		↑	↓	Astor Place		6	
Stops late nights only		↑	↓	Bleecker Street	Disabled access	6 D F (IND Sixth Avenue Line at Broadway–Lafayette Street)	
Stops late nights only		↑	↓	Spring Street		6	
Stops late nights only		↑	↓	Canal Street	Disabled access	6 N Q (BMT Broadway Line); J (BMT Nassau Street Line)	
Stops all times		Stops rush hours only (limited service)	Stops late nights only	Brooklyn Bridge–City Hall	Disabled access	5 6 <6> J Z (BMT Nassau Street Line at Chambers Street)	
Stops all times		Stops rush hours only (limited service)	Stops late nights only	Fulton Street	Disabled access	5; 2 3 (IRT Broadway–Seventh Avenue Line); A C (IND Eighth Avenue Line); J Z (BMT Nassau Street Line)	Connection to N R W (BMT Broadway Line) at Cortlandt Street via Dey Street Passageway PATH at World Trade Center
Stops all times		Stops rush hours only (limited service)	Stops late nights only	Wall Street		5	
Stops all times		Stops rush hours only (limited service)	Stops late nights only	Bowling Green	Disabled access	5	M15 Select Bus Service Staten Island Ferry at Whitehall Terminal; Southern terminus of two a.m. rush hour trips and special event express service
Brooklyn
Eastern Parkway Line
Stops all times		Stops rush hours only (limited service)	—N/a	Borough Hall	Disabled access	5; 2 3 (IRT Broadway–Seventh Avenue Line); N R W (BMT Fourth Avenue Line at Court Street)	
Stops all times		Stops rush hours only (limited service)	—N/a	Nevins Street		2 3 5	
Stops all times		Stops rush hours only (limited service)	—N/a	Atlantic Avenue–Barclays Center	Disabled access	2 3 5 B Q (BMT Brighton Line); D N R W (BMT Fourth Avenue Line)	LIRR Atlantic Branch at Atlantic Terminal
Stops rush hours only (limited service)	Stops late nights only	↑	—N/a	Bergen Street		2 3	
Stops rush hours only (limited service)	Stops late nights only	↑	—N/a	Grand Army Plaza		2 3	
Stops rush hours only (limited service)	Stops late nights only	↑	—N/a	Eastern Parkway–Brooklyn Museum	Disabled access	2 3	
Stops all times		Stops rush hours only (limited service)	—N/a	Franklin Avenue–Medgar Evers College		2 3 5 S (BMT Franklin Avenue Line at Botanic Garden)	
Stops rush hours only (limited service)	Stops late nights only	↑	—N/a	Nostrand Avenue		2 3 5	
Stops rush hours only (limited service)	Stops late nights only	↑	—N/a	Kingston Avenue		2 3 5	
Stops all times		Stops rush hours only (limited service)	—N/a	Crown Heights–Utica Avenue	Disabled access	2 3 5	B46 Select Bus Service
New Lots Line (late nights and select rush hour trips)
Stops rush hours in the peak direction only (limited service)	Stops late nights only	—N/a		Sutter Avenue–Rutland Road		2 3 5	B15 bus to JFK Int'l Airport
Stops rush hours in the peak direction only (limited service)	Stops late nights only	—N/a		Saratoga Avenue		2 3 5	
Stops rush hours in the peak direction only (limited service)	Stops late nights only	—N/a		Rockaway Avenue		2 3 5	
Stops rush hours in the peak direction only (limited service)	Stops late nights only	—N/a		Junius Street		2 3 5 Out-of-system transfer with MetroCard/OMNY: L (BMT Canarsie Line at Livonia Avenue)	
Stops rush hours in the peak direction only (limited service)	Stops late nights only	—N/a		Pennsylvania Avenue		2 3 5	
Stops rush hours in the peak direction only (limited service)	Stops late nights only	—N/a		Van Siclen Avenue		2 3 5	
Stops rush hours in the peak direction only (limited service)	Stops late nights only	—N/a		New Lots Avenue		2 3 5	B15 bus to JFK Int'l Airport

== In film and literature ==
The 4 train is featured prominently in the 2025 Spike Lee film Highest 2 Lowest.
