= 6 (New York City Subway service) =

Rapid transit service

- Lexington Avenue Local; Pelham Express

- A Bronx bound 6 local train of R62A cars at Brooklyn Bridge-City Hall

- A Manhattan bound 6 express train of R62A cars passing through Westchester Square-East Tremont Avenue

- Northern end: Pelham Bay Park (all times); Parkchester (weekdays, peak direction)
- Southern end: Brooklyn Bridge–City Hall
- Stations: 38 (local service); 29 (express service)
- Rolling stock: R62A (Rolling stock assignments subject to change)
- Depot: Westchester Yard
- Started service: October 27, 1904; 122 years ago

The 6 Lexington Avenue Local and <6> Pelham Express are two rapid transit services in the A Division of the New York City Subway. Their route emblems, or "bullets", are colored forest green since they use the IRT Lexington Avenue Line in Manhattan. Local service is denoted by a (6) in a circular bullet, and express service is denoted by a <6> in a diamond-shaped bullet. On the R62A rolling stock, this is often indicated by LEDs around the service logo to indicate local or express service to riders. The LEDs illuminate in a green circle pattern for 6 local trains and in a red diamond pattern for <6> trains.

The 6 operates 24 hours daily between Pelham Bay Park in the Bronx and Brooklyn Bridge–City Hall in Lower Manhattan, making all stops in Manhattan. Additional service short turns at Parkchester in the Bronx during weekday rush hours and middays and does not operate to or from Pelham Bay Park; during this time, 6 trains that originate and terminate at Parkchester make all stops in the Bronx, while trains that serve the full route make express stops in the Bronx between Parkchester and Third Avenue–138th Street in the peak direction and are labeled as <6> Express trains; when the <6> Express is not running, 6 trains originate and terminate at Pelham Bay Park and make all stops in the Bronx.

The 6 in its current format has run since the implementation of the IRT "H" system in 1918. Since 1920, it has remained largely unchanged, running between Pelham Bay Park and City Hall with a peak-express variant in the Bronx. In 1945, the city closed the City Hall Loop station, the 6's former southern terminal in Manhattan. Since then, most 6 trains have terminated at Brooklyn Bridge, with a few exceptions in later years. In 2025, the 6 is the busiest route in the subway system, carrying around 140 million passengers in 2023 and 560,000 daily riders in 2025.

== History ==
=== Under the Interborough Rapid Transit ===
On October 27, 1904, local and express service opened on the original subway in Manhattan, following the route of the present IRT Lexington Avenue Line from City Hall to Grand Central–42nd Street. From there, the service traveled west on 42nd Street on the route of the present 42nd Street Shuttle, and then north on the present IRT Broadway–Seventh Avenue Line to 145th Street.

The current "H" configuration, with separate services along Lexington Avenue and Broadway/Seventh Avenue, was introduced in 1917. Full Lexington Avenue local service from City Hall to 125th Street opened on July 17, 1918. Local service was extended to Third Avenue–138th Street on August 1, 1918.

On January 7, 1919, trains were extended from 138th Street to Hunts Point Avenue, and to East 177th Street on May 30, 1920. Service between Hunts Point Avenue and East 177th Street was originally served by a shuttle service operating with elevated cars.

On October 24, 1920, service was extended again to Westchester Square. On December 20, 1920, service was extended to Pelham Bay Park. Service to Pelham Bay Park was served by a mix of through and shuttle trains during the 1920s.

On December 21, 1925, the number of Manhattan-bound through trains in the morning rush hour, between 7 a.m. and 8 a.m., was increased from thirteen to eighteen; a 38 percent increase in service. The remainder of trains continued operating as a shuttle service to Hunts Point Avenue.

On January 28, 1931, two southbound morning rush hour trips began starting at Pelham Bay Park instead of Hunts Point Avenue. On April 13, 1931, service to Pelham Bay Park was increased. Two additional southbound trips were added, starting at Pelham Bay Park at 5:50 and 6:10 a.m., reducing headways from ten to five minutes. Four northbound trips that terminated at Hunts Point Avenue between 3:53 and 5:05 p.m. were extended to Pelham Bay Park, reducing headways from nine to six minutes, and four northbound trips terminating at Third Avenue-138th Street between 3:36 and 4:48 p.m. were extended to Hunts Point Avenue, reducing headways from 4 1/2 to 3 minutes.

By 1934, service south of the City Hall station had been discontinued and late-night service ran from Pelham Bay Park to 125th Street only, being replaced by local service on the 4, which had previously run express.

=== Under the New York City Board of Transportation ===
Effective December 31, 1945, City Hall station closed with the former Brooklyn Bridge station (renamed to Brooklyn Bridge–City Hall) being the permanent southern terminal. However, the 6 train still uses the loop to get from the southbound to the northbound local track at Brooklyn Bridge–City Hall.

On May 10, 1946, late-night service was extended from 125th Street to its previous terminus at Brooklyn Bridge when late-night express service on the 4 was restored.

Beginning October 14, 1946, weekday rush and Saturday morning rush peak direction express service started, with Pelham Bay trains using the middle track between East 177th Street and Third Avenue–138th Street. This express service saved eight minutes between Third Avenue and East 177th Street. During this time, 6 trains that ran local in the Bronx when express trains operated began to terminate at East 177 Street to make room for express trains to Pelham Bay Park. On March 7, 1949, the hours of the evening Bronx-bound express service were advanced from 4:30 to 3:30 p.m., and on June 17, 1949, the hours of the morning Manhattan-bound express service were extended from 9:30 to 10:30 a.m.

On September 22, 1948, 54 additional cars were placed in service on the 6 train, increasing the lengths of trains from six cars to seven cars.

The IRT routes were given numbered designations with the introduction of "R-type" rolling stock, which contained rollsign curtains with numbered designations for each service. The first such fleet, the R12, was put into service in 1948. The Lexington–Pelham Bay route became known as the 6.

From December 15 to 22, 1950, the weekday rush hour trains from Pelham Bay Park were extended to South Ferry.

=== Under the New York City Transit Authority ===
On June 23, 1956, Saturday morning express service began operating local. On March 1, 1960, late-night express service on the 4 was suspended when the 4 and 6 ran local in Manhattan together. On April 8, 1960, late-night and weekend evening trains were extended to South Ferry. On October 17, 1965, late-night 4 service began running express once again, and weekend evening 6 service was extended to South Ferry. Trains were cut back from South Ferry to Brooklyn Bridge on May 23, 1976.

Beginning on January 13, 1980, late-night service terminated at 125th Street in Manhattan with the 4 again making all stops south of there. This service cut affected 15,000 riders and was criticized by Manhattan Borough President Andrew Stein as no public hearing was held. On the same day, Bronx express service was expanded to operate during middays, with Pelham Bay trains running express in the peak direction to Brooklyn Bridge in the morning and to Pelham Bay Park in the afternoon.

From March to May 1985, one weekday morning rush hour train was extended to Atlantic Avenue, terminated there, and returned in service to Pelham Bay Park. This service change was made due to track reconstruction taking place at Penn Station at the time, which forced some Long Island Rail Road trains to be diverted from Penn Station to Atlantic Terminal (then known as Flatbush Avenue), disrupting service for LIRR passengers; as a result, morning rush hour service on the routes serving the Lexington Avenue Line was increased in order to transport LIRR passengers who took diverted trains to Flatbush Avenue to reach Manhattan.

From January 21 to October 5, 1990, late-night service was extended back to Brooklyn Bridge when late-night express service on the 4 was restored. But the 6 was then cut back to 125th Street for the last time when late-night express service on the 4 in Manhattan was permanently discontinued.

Effective October 3, 1999, the 4 and 6 trains once again began to operate local together in Manhattan late nights when the 6 train was permanently extended back to Brooklyn Bridge.

After the September 11, 2001 attacks, 6 service was cut back to Grand Central–42nd Street in the southbound direction. Southbound trains discharged at Grand Central, operated out of service to Brooklyn Bridge, and re-entered service at Brooklyn Bridge in the northbound direction. By the evening of September 12, service was restored to Spring Street, but southbound trains terminated at Bleecker Street, operated out of service to Brooklyn Bridge, and re-entered service at Spring Street. Normal 6 service was restored on September 17.

In August 2023, weekend frequencies on the 6 were increased from eight minutes to six minutes.

Until the timetable in effect on December 15, 2024, weekdays from 9:00 to 11:00 a.m., select Manhattan-bound <6> trains ran local from Parkchester to Hunts Point Avenue while select Parkchester-bound 6 trains ran express in that section. After this date, all Manhattan-bound <6> trains ran express and all Parkchester-bound 6 trains ran local in this section.

== Route ==
=== Signage history ===
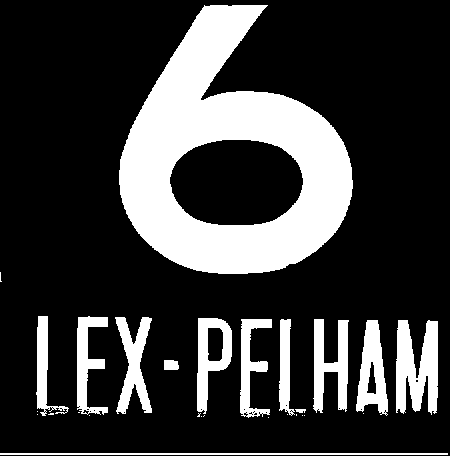
Pre-1967 bullet used on the R12s to R36s

1967–1979 bullet

The local bullet used since 1979

The express bullet currently used

=== Service pattern ===
The following table shows the lines used by 6 and <6>, with shaded boxes indicating the route at the specified times:

Line	From	To	Tracks	Times		
Line	From	To	Tracks	6 service	6 diamond service	6 service
Line	From	To	Tracks	weekday peak direction		all other times
IRT Pelham Line (full line)	Pelham Bay Park	Castle Hill Avenue	local			
IRT Pelham Line (full line)	Parkchester	Third Avenue–138th Street	express			
IRT Pelham Line (full line)	Parkchester	Third Avenue–138th Street	local			
IRT Lexington Avenue Line	125th Street	Brooklyn Bridge–City Hall	local			

=== Stations ===
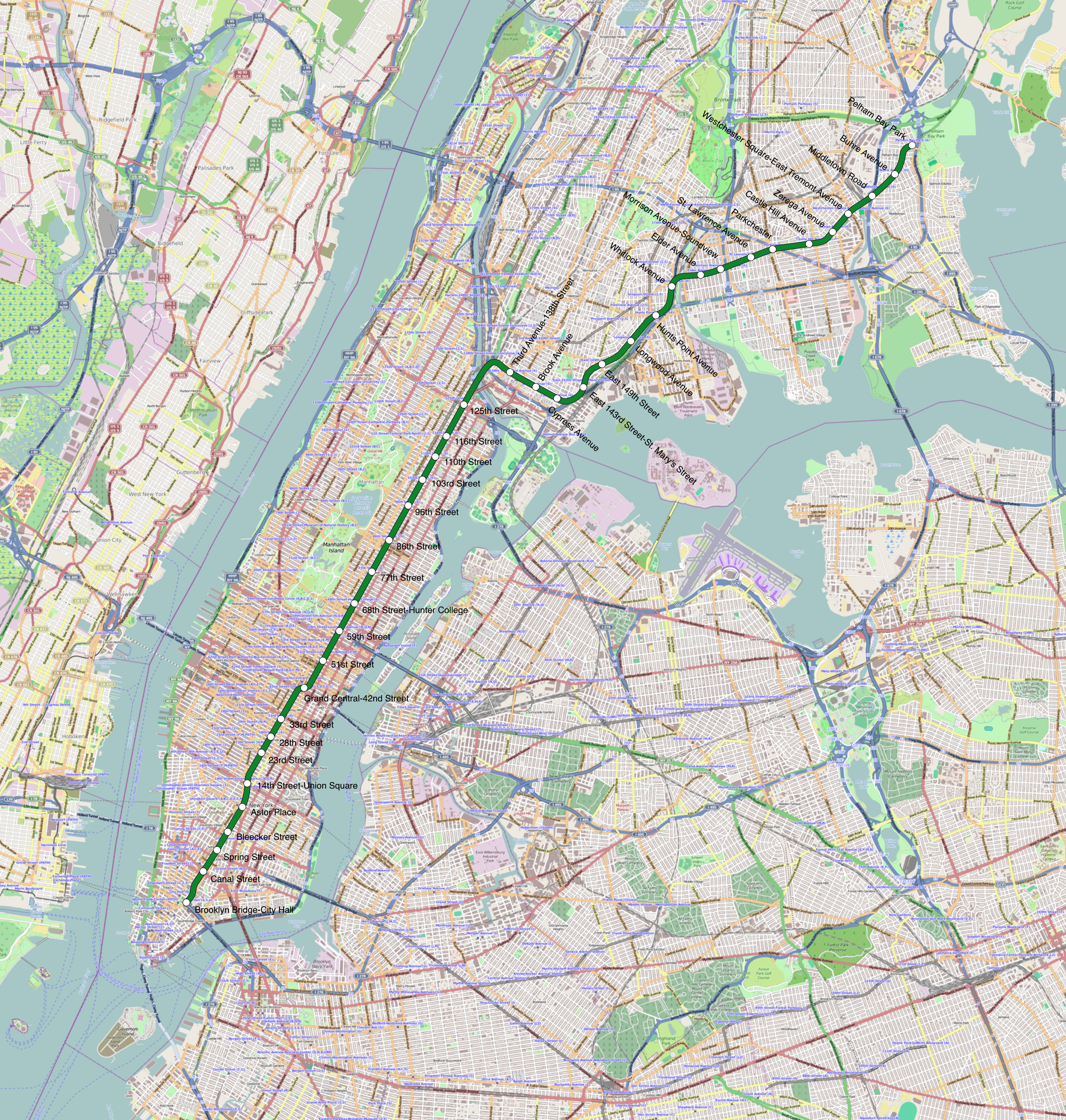
To scale line map

For a more detailed station listing, see the articles on the lines listed above. <6> service is suspended during severe winter weather.

Station service legend
Stops all times	Stops 24 hours a day
Stops all times except late nights	Stops every day during daytime hours only
Stops late nights only	Stops every day during overnight hours only
Stops weekdays during the day	Stops during weekday daytime hours only
Stops all times except weekdays in the peak direction	Stops every day except during weekdays in the peak direction
Stops weekdays in the peak direction only	Stops during weekdays in the peak direction only
Station closed	Station closed
Time period details
Disabled access	Station is compliant with the Americans with Disabilities Act
↑	Station is compliant with the Americans with Disabilities Act in the indicated direction only
↓	Station is compliant with the Americans with Disabilities Act in the indicated direction only
	Elevator access to mezzanine only

6 service	6 diamond service	Stations	Disabled access	Subway transfers	Connections/other notes
The Bronx
Pelham Line
Stops all times except weekdays in the peak direction	Stops weekdays in the peak direction only	Pelham Bay Park	Disabled access		Bx12 Select Bus Service
Stops all times except weekdays in the peak direction	Stops weekdays in the peak direction only	Buhre Avenue			
Stops all times except weekdays in the peak direction	Stops weekdays in the peak direction only	Middletown Road			
Stops all times except weekdays in the peak direction	Stops weekdays in the peak direction only	Westchester Square–East Tremont Avenue	Disabled access		
Stops all times except weekdays in the peak direction	Stops weekdays in the peak direction only	Zerega Avenue			
Stops all times except weekdays in the peak direction	Stops weekdays in the peak direction only	Castle Hill Avenue			
Stops all times	Stops weekdays in the peak direction only	Parkchester	Disabled access		Q44 Select Bus Service; On weekdays, all local peak direction and alternating trains in the off peak direction during rush hour and midday begin and end at this station.
Stops all times	|	St. Lawrence Avenue			
Stops all times	|	Morrison Avenue–Soundview			
Stops all times	|	Elder Avenue			
Stops all times	|	Whitlock Avenue			
Stops all times	Stops weekdays in the peak direction only	Hunts Point Avenue	Disabled access		Bx6 Select Bus Service
Stops all times	|	Longwood Avenue			
Stops all times	|	East 149th Street	Disabled access		
Stops all times	|	East 143rd Street–St. Mary's Street			
Stops all times	|	Cypress Avenue			
Stops all times	|	Brook Avenue			
Stops all times	Stops weekdays in the peak direction only	Third Avenue–138th Street			Some a.m. rush hour trips to/from Manhattan begin or end at this station.
Manhattan
Lexington Avenue Line
Stops all times	Stops weekdays in the peak direction only	125th Street	Disabled access	4 5	Metro-North Railroad at Harlem–125th Street; M60 Select Bus Service to LaGuardia Airport; One southbound p.m. rush hour trip begins at this station.
Stops all times	Stops weekdays in the peak direction only	116th Street		4	
Stops all times	Stops weekdays in the peak direction only	110th Street		4	
Stops all times	Stops weekdays in the peak direction only	103rd Street		4	
Stops all times	Stops weekdays in the peak direction only	96th Street		4	
Stops all times	Stops weekdays in the peak direction only	86th Street	↑	4 5	M86 Select Bus Service; Station is ADA-accessible in the northbound direction for the local platform only.
Stops all times	Stops weekdays in the peak direction only	77th Street		4	M79 Select Bus Service
Stops all times	Stops weekdays in the peak direction only	68th Street–Hunter College	Disabled access	4	
Stops all times	Stops weekdays in the peak direction only	59th Street	↑	4 5 N R W (BMT Broadway Line at Lexington Avenue–59th Street); Out-of-system transfer with MetroCard/OMNY: F M N Q R (63rd Street Lines at Lexington Avenue–63rd Street)	Roosevelt Island Tramway; Elevator access via Bloomingdale's in the northbound direction only during Bloomingdale's operating hours; no ADA access.
Stops all times	Stops weekdays in the peak direction only	51st Street	Disabled access	4 E F <F> (IND Queens Boulevard Line at Lexington Avenue–53rd Street)	
Stops all times	Stops weekdays in the peak direction only	Grand Central–42nd Street	Disabled access	4 5; 7 <7> (IRT Flushing Line); S (42nd Street Shuttle)	Metro-North Railroad at Grand Central Terminal; Long Island Rail Road at Grand Central Madison
Stops all times	Stops weekdays in the peak direction only	33rd Street		4	M34 / M34A Select Bus Service; NYC Ferry: East River, Astoria, and Soundview Routes (on FDR Drive and East 34th Street)
Stops all times	Stops weekdays in the peak direction only	28th Street	↓	4	Station is ADA-accessible in the southbound direction only.
Stops all times	Stops weekdays in the peak direction only	23rd Street–Baruch College	Disabled access	4	M23 Select Bus Service; NYC Ferry: Soundview Route (on FDR Drive/Avenue C and East 20th Street)
Stops all times	Stops weekdays in the peak direction only	14th Street–Union Square	Elevator access to mezzanine only	4 5 L (BMT Canarsie Line); N Q R W (BMT Broadway Line)	M14A / M14D Select Bus Service
Stops all times	Stops weekdays in the peak direction only	Astor Place		4	
Stops all times	Stops weekdays in the peak direction only	Bleecker Street	Disabled access	4 B D F <F> M (IND Sixth Avenue Line at Broadway–Lafayette Street)	
Stops all times	Stops weekdays in the peak direction only	Spring Street		4	
Stops all times	Stops weekdays in the peak direction only	Canal Street	Disabled access	4 N Q R W (BMT Broadway Line); J Z (BMT Nassau Street Line)	
Stops all times	Stops weekdays in the peak direction only	Brooklyn Bridge–City Hall	Disabled access	4 5 J Z (BMT Nassau Street Line at Chambers Street)	
