= Eighth Street–New York University station =

New York City Subway station in Manhattan

8 Street–New York University
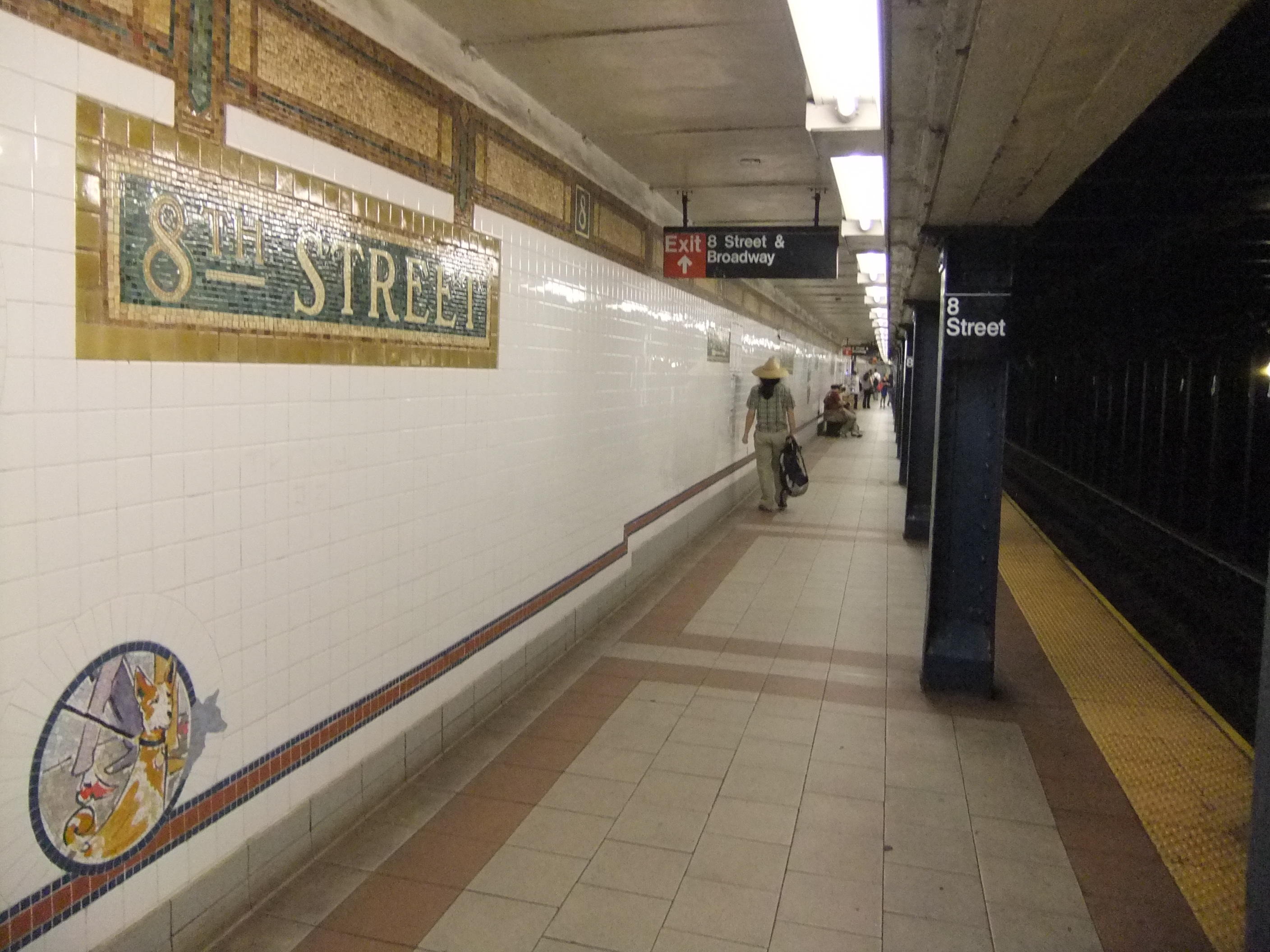
- Platform for downtown trains

Station statistics
- Address: East 8th Street & Broadway; New York, New York
- Borough: Manhattan
- Locale: Greenwich Village, NoHo
- Coordinates: 40.730543°N 73.992448°W
- Division: B (BMT)
- Line: BMT Broadway Line
- Services: N (weekends and late nights); Q (late nights only); R (all except late nights); W (weekdays only)
- Transit: NYCT Bus: M1, M2, M3, M8, M55, X27, X28
- Structure: Underground
- Platforms: 2 side platforms
- Tracks: 4

Other information
- Opened: September 4, 1917; 109 years ago
- Former/other names: 8th Street-NYU

Traffic
- 2025: 4,297,327 ▲6.9%
- Rank: 77 out of 423
Services
Preceding station	New York City Subway	Following station
14th Street–Union Square N Q R W via Lexington Avenue–59th Street	Local	Prince Street N Q R W via Whitehall Street–South Ferry
Location
Location within New York City Subway
Location within New York City
Location within New York
Track layout
Street map
Station service legend
Symbol	Description
Stops all times except late nights	Stops all times except late nights
Stops weekdays during the day	Stops weekdays during the day
Stops late nights and weekends	Stops late nights and weekends
Stops late nights only	Stops late nights only

The Eighth Street–New York University station (also known as 8th Street–NYU) is a local station on the New York City Subway's BMT Broadway Line. Located at the intersection of Eighth Street and Broadway in Greenwich Village, Manhattan, it is served by the R train at all times except late nights, the W train on weekdays, the N train during late nights and weekends, and the Q train during late nights. It serves the main campus of New York University.

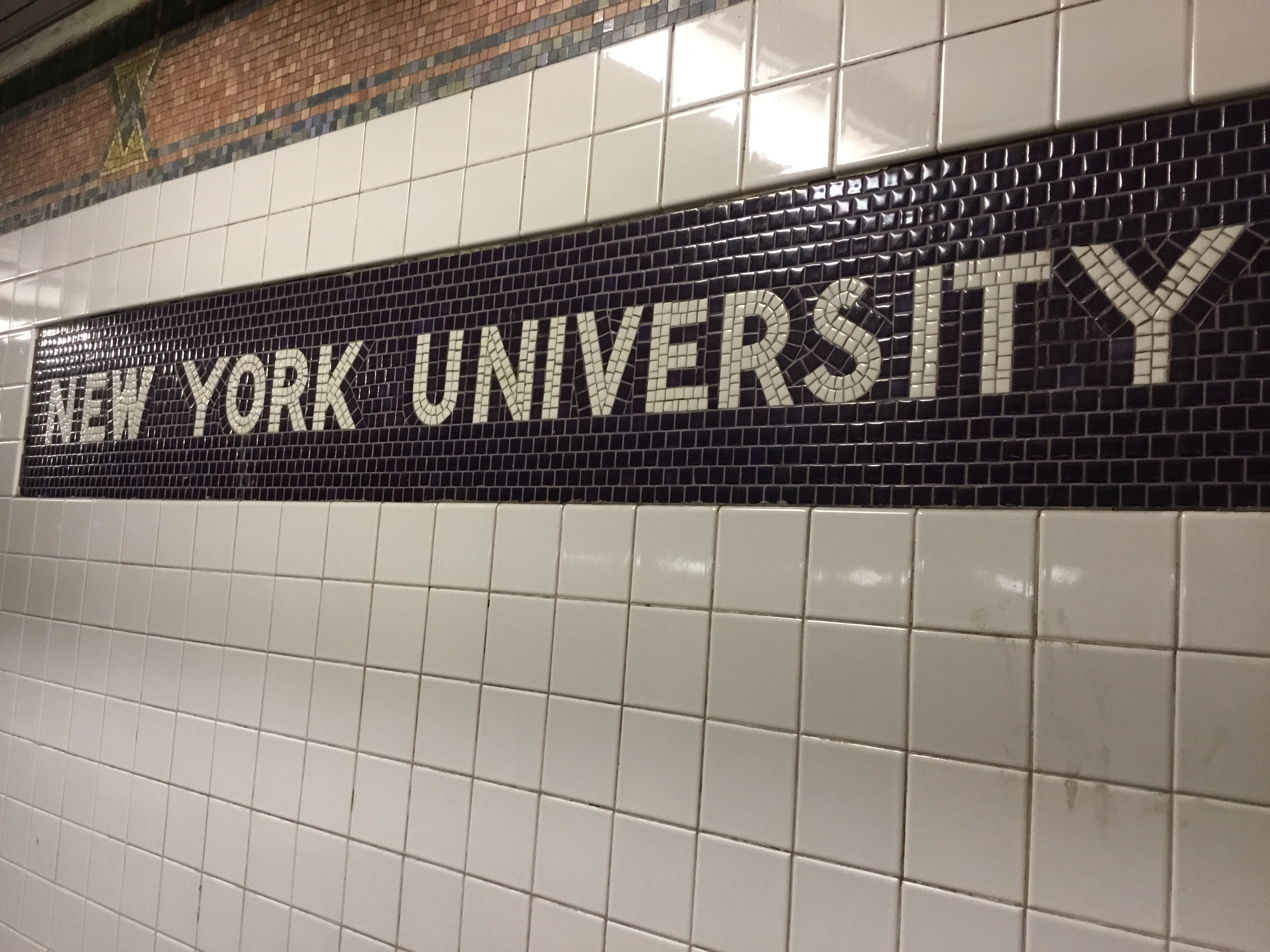
New York University Mosaic Tile

== History ==
=== Construction and opening ===
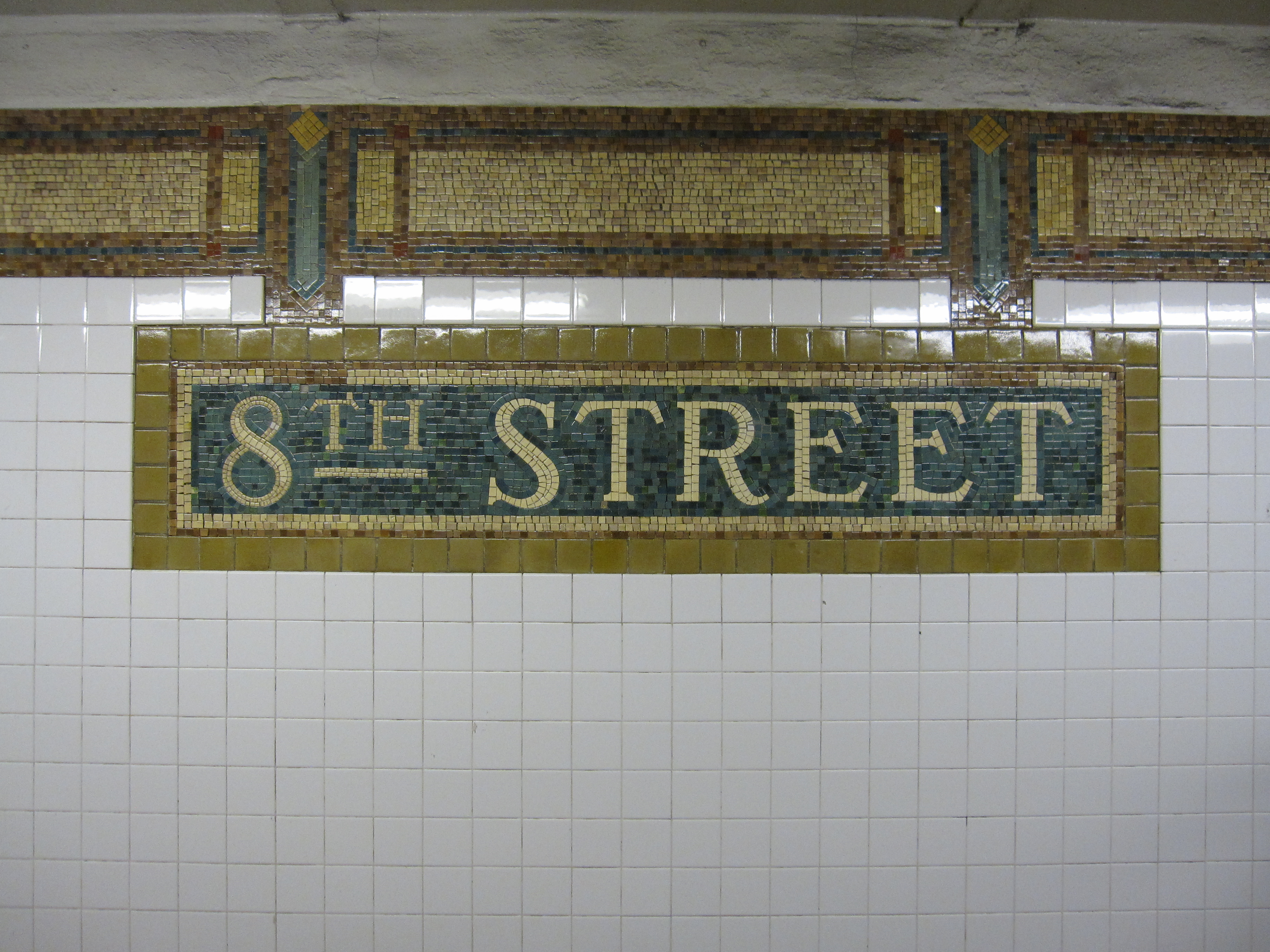
Name mosaic

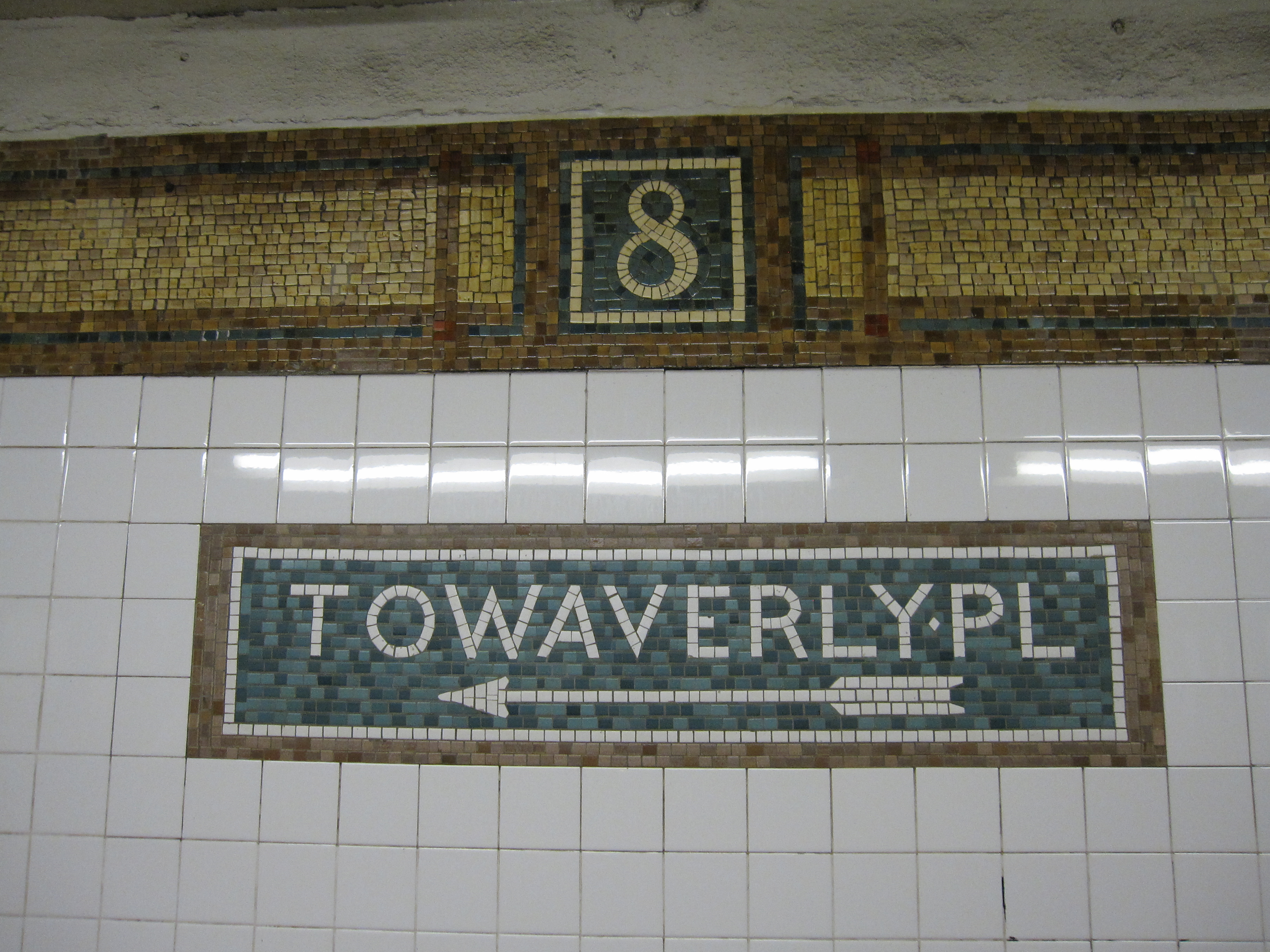
Frieze and directional mosaic

The New York Public Service Commission adopted plans for what was known as the Broadway–Lexington Avenue route on December 31, 1907. This route began at the Battery and ran under Greenwich Street, Vesey Street, Broadway to Ninth Street, private property to Irving Place, and Irving Place and Lexington Avenue to the Harlem River. After crossing under the Harlem River into the Bronx, the route split at Park Avenue and 138th Street, with one branch continuing north to and along Jerome Avenue to Woodlawn Cemetery, and the other heading east and northeast along 138th Street, Southern Boulevard, and Westchester Avenue to Pelham Bay Park. In early 1908, the Tri-borough plan was formed, combining this route, the under-construction Centre Street Loop Subway in Manhattan and Fourth Avenue Subway in Brooklyn, a Canal Street subway from the Fourth Avenue Subway via the Manhattan Bridge to the Hudson River, and several other lines in Brooklyn.

The Brooklyn Rapid Transit Company submitted a proposal to the Commission, dated March 2, 1911, to operate the Tri-borough system (but under Church Street instead of Greenwich Street), as well as a branch along Broadway, Seventh Avenue, and 59th Street from Ninth Street north and east to the Queensboro Bridge; the Canal Street subway was to merge with the Broadway Line instead of continuing to the Hudson River. The city, the BRT, and the Interborough Rapid Transit Company (which operated the first subway and four elevated lines in Manhattan) came to an agreement, and sent a report to the New York City Board of Estimate on June 5, 1911. The line along Broadway to 59th Street was assigned to the BRT, while the IRT obtained the Lexington Avenue line, connecting with its existing route at Grand Central–42nd Street. Construction began on Lexington Avenue on July 31, and on Broadway the next year. The Dual Contracts, two operating contracts between the city and the BMT and IRT, were adopted on March 4, 1913.

A short portion of the line, coming off the north side of the Manhattan Bridge through Canal Street to 14th Street–Union Square, opened on September 4, 1917, at 2 P.M., with an eight car train carrying members of the Public Service Commission, representatives of the city government and officials of the BRT, leaving Union Square toward Coney Island. Service opened to the general public at 8 P.M., with trains leaving Union Square and Coney Island simultaneously. The line was served by two services. One route ran via the Fourth Avenue Line and the Sea Beach Line to Coney Island, while the other line, the short line, ran to Ninth Avenue, where passengers could transfer for West End and Culver Line service. The initial headway on the line was three minutes during rush hours, three minutes and forty-five seconds at other times, except during late nights when service ran every fifteen minutes.

=== Later years ===
The station's platforms originally could only fit six 67-foot-long (20 m) cars. In 1926, the New York City Board of Transportation received bids for the lengthening of platforms at nine stations on the Broadway Line, including the Eighth Street station, to accommodate eight-car trains. Edwards & Flood submitted a low bid of $101,775 for the project. The platform-lengthening project was completed in 1927, bringing the length of the platforms to 535 feet (163 m).

The city government took over the BMT's operations on June 1, 1940. The station's overhaul in the late 1960s included extending the station platforms required for 10 car trains, and fixing the station's structure and the overall appearance (including the staircases and platform edges), replacing the original wall tiles, old signs, and incandescent lighting to the 70's modern look wall tile band and tablet mosaics, signs and fluorescent lights.

In 2001, the station received a state of repairs including upgrading the station for ADA compliance and restoring the original late 1910s tiling, repairing the staircases, re-tiling for the walls, new tiling on the floors, upgrading the station's lights and the public address system, installing ADA yellow safety threads along the platform edge, new signs, and new trackbeds in both directions.

In 2005, the artwork Tim Snell's Broadway Diary mosaics installed on the station platform wall titles in both directions.

== Station layout ==
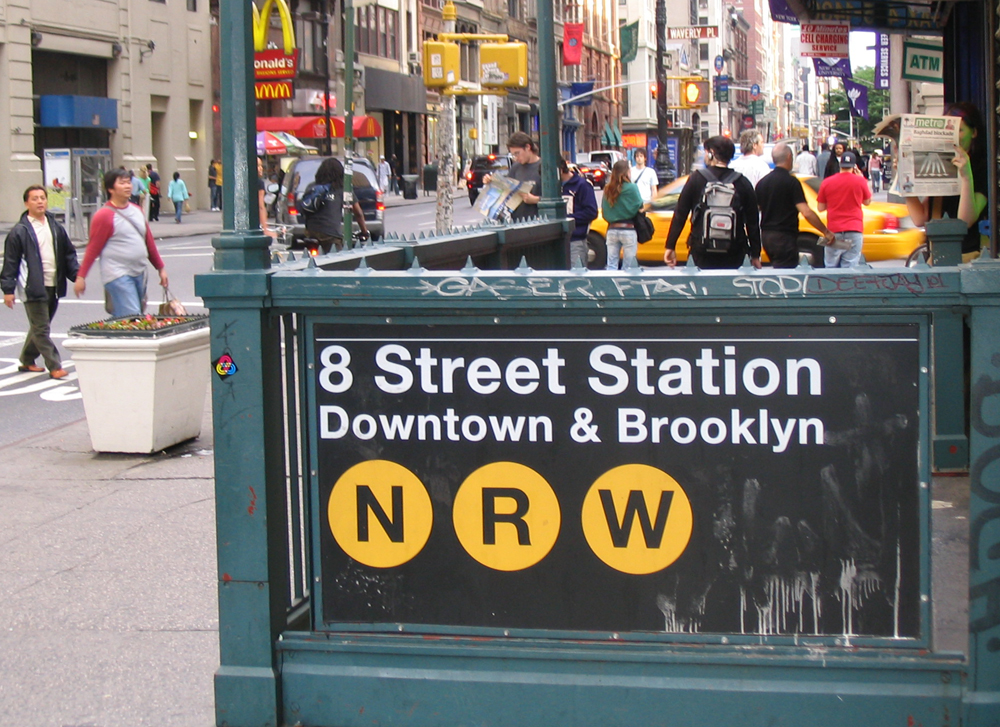
Station entrance

This underground station has four tracks and two side platforms. The inner two tracks are express tracks that do not serve the station.

=== Exits ===
The staffed fare control for each platform is at platform level at the center of each platform. There is no free transfer between directions. Outside of fare control, the northbound platform has one street stair to each eastern corner of Broadway and Eighth Street, while the southbound platform has two street stairs to each western corner of that intersection.

Near the southern ends of each platform, one stair ascends from each platform to an intermediate landing on each side. Each landing has an exit-only turnstile and a HEET turnstile. The exits then ascend to their respective northern corners of Broadway and Waverly Place (the southbound platform's exit to the northwest corner, the northbound platform's exit to the northeast corner).
