= 18th Street station (IRT Lexington Avenue Line) =

Former New York City Subway station in Manhattan (closed 1948)

18 Street
- Former New York City Subway station
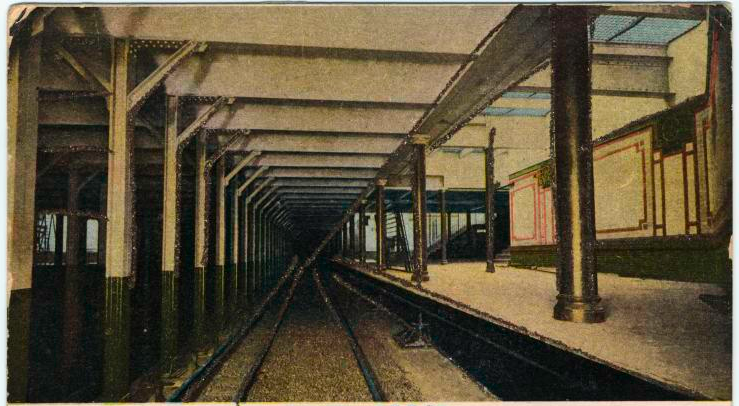
- 18th Street station shortly after construction

Station statistics
- Address: East 18th Street & Park Avenue South; New York, NY
- Borough: Manhattan
- Locale: Gramercy
- Coordinates: 40.737°N 73.989°W
- Division: A (IRT)
- Line: IRT Lexington Avenue Line
- Services: None (abandoned)
- Structure: Underground
- Platforms: 2 side platforms
- Tracks: 4

Other information
- Opened: October 27, 1904 (121 years ago)
- Closed: November 8, 1948 (77 years ago)

Station succession
- Next north: 23rd Street–Baruch College
- Next south: 14th Street–Union Square
Location
Location within New York City Subway
Location within New York City
Location within New York
Track layout
Street map

The 18th Street station was a local station on the IRT Lexington Avenue Line of the New York City Subway. It was located at the intersection of Park Avenue South and 18th Street in Gramercy, Manhattan.

The 18th Street station was constructed for the Interborough Rapid Transit Company (IRT) as part of the city's first subway line, which was approved in 1900. Construction of the line segment that includes the 18th Street station started on September 12 of the same year. The station opened on October 27, 1904, as one of the original 28 stations of the New York City Subway. The station was closed on November 8, 1948, as a result of a platform lengthening project at 23rd Street.

The 18th Street station contains two abandoned side platforms and four tracks. The station was built with tile and mosaic decorations. Many of these decorations have been covered with graffiti.

== History ==
=== Construction and opening ===
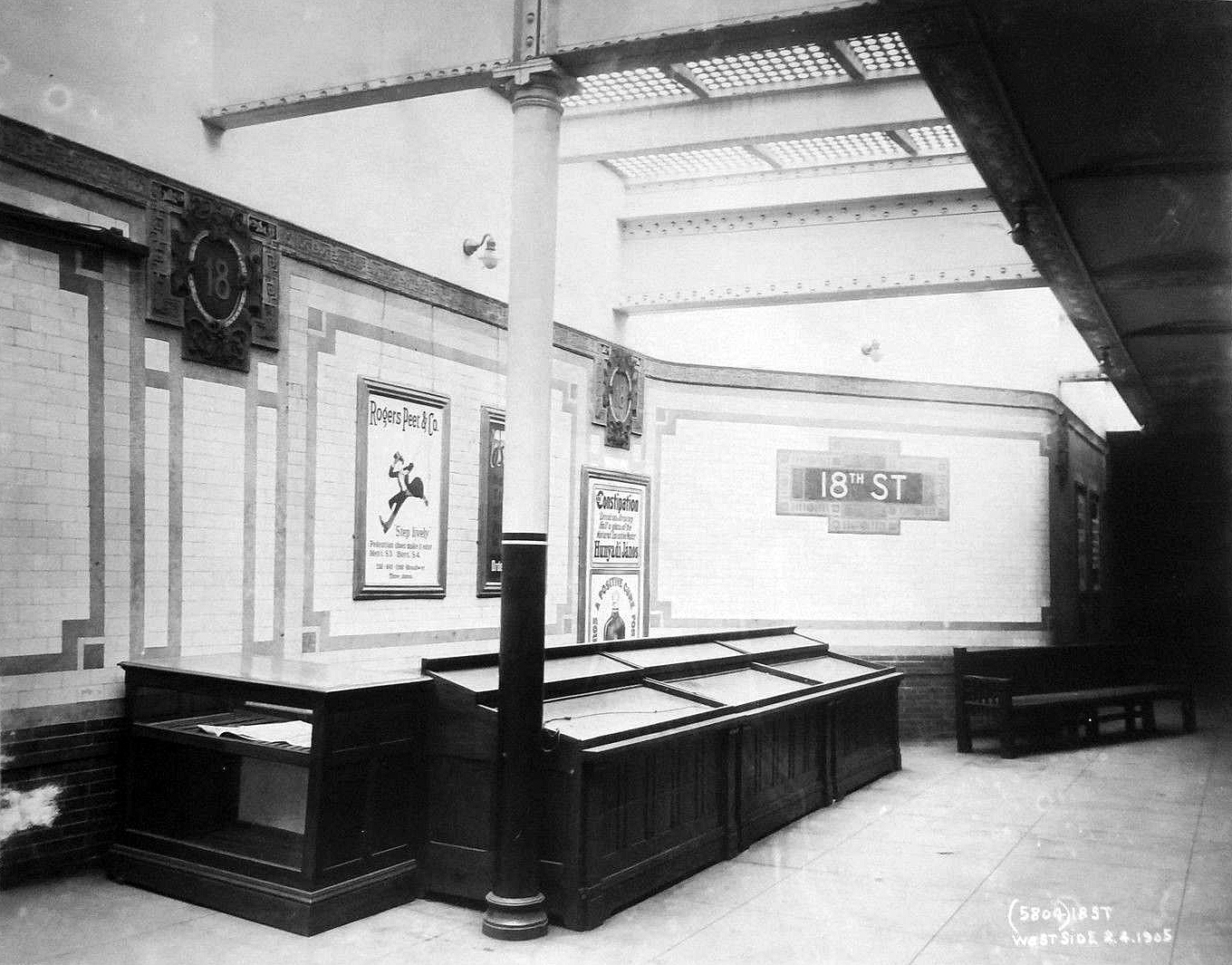
The station in 1904

Planning for a subway line in New York City dates to 1864. However, development of what would become the city's first subway line did not start until 1894, when the New York State Legislature passed the Rapid Transit Act. The subway plans were drawn up by a team of engineers led by William Barclay Parsons, the Rapid Transit Commission's chief engineer. It called for a subway line from New York City Hall in lower Manhattan to the Upper West Side, where two branches would lead north into the Bronx. A plan was formally adopted in 1897, and all legal conflicts over the route alignment were resolved near the end of 1899. The Rapid Transit Construction Company, organized by John B. McDonald and funded by August Belmont Jr., signed the initial Contract 1 with the Rapid Transit Commission in February 1900, in which it would construct the subway and maintain a 50-year operating lease from the opening of the line. In 1901, the firm of Heins & LaFarge was hired to design the underground stations. Belmont incorporated the Interborough Rapid Transit Company (IRT) in April 1902 to operate the subway.

The 18th Street station was constructed as part of the route segment from Great Jones Street to 41st Street. Construction on this section of the line began on September 12, 1900. The section from Great Jones Street to a point 100 feet (30 m) north of 33rd Street was awarded to Holbrook, Cabot & Daly Contracting Company, while the remaining section to 41st Street was done by Ira A. Shaker. By late 1903, the subway was nearly complete, but the IRT Powerhouse and the system's electrical substations were still under construction, delaying the system's opening. The 18th Street station opened on October 27, 1904, as one of the original 28 stations of the New York City Subway from City Hall to 145th Street on the Broadway–Seventh Avenue Line.

=== Service changes and closure ===
After the first subway line was completed in 1908, the station was served by local trains along both the West Side (now the Broadway–Seventh Avenue Line to Van Cortlandt Park–242nd Street) and East Side (now the Lenox Avenue Line). West Side local trains had their southern terminus at City Hall during rush hours and South Ferry at other times, and had their northern terminus at 242nd Street. East Side local trains ran from City Hall to Lenox Avenue (145th Street).

To address overcrowding, in 1909, the New York Public Service Commission proposed lengthening the platforms at stations along the original IRT subway. As part of a modification to the IRT's construction contracts made on January 18, 1910, the company was to lengthen station platforms to accommodate ten-car express and six-car local trains. In addition to $1.5 million (equivalent to $51.8 million in 2025) spent on platform lengthening, $500,000 (equivalent to $17.3 million in 2025) was spent on building additional entrances and exits. It was anticipated that these improvements would increase capacity by 25 percent. Platforms at local stations, such as the 18th Street station, were lengthened by between 20 and 30 feet (6.1 and 9.1 m). Both platforms were extended to the north and south. Six-car local trains began operating in October 1910. The Lexington Avenue Line opened north of Grand Central–42nd Street in 1918, and the original line was divided into an H-shaped system. All local trains were sent via the Lexington Avenue Line, running along the Pelham Line in the Bronx.

In December 1922, the Transit Commission approved a $3 million project to lengthen platforms at 14 local stations along the original IRT line, including 18th Street and seven other stations on the Lexington Avenue Line. Platform lengths at these stations would be increased from 225 to 436 feet (69 to 133 m). The commission postponed the platform-lengthening project in September 1923, at which point the cost had risen to $5.6 million.

The closing of this station was proposed as early as 1928. The city government took over the IRT's operations on June 12, 1940. The station closed on November 8, 1948. The platforms at 23rd Street had been lengthened, with entrances at 22nd Street, and the 18th Street station was close to the 14th Street–Union Square station.

== Station layout ==
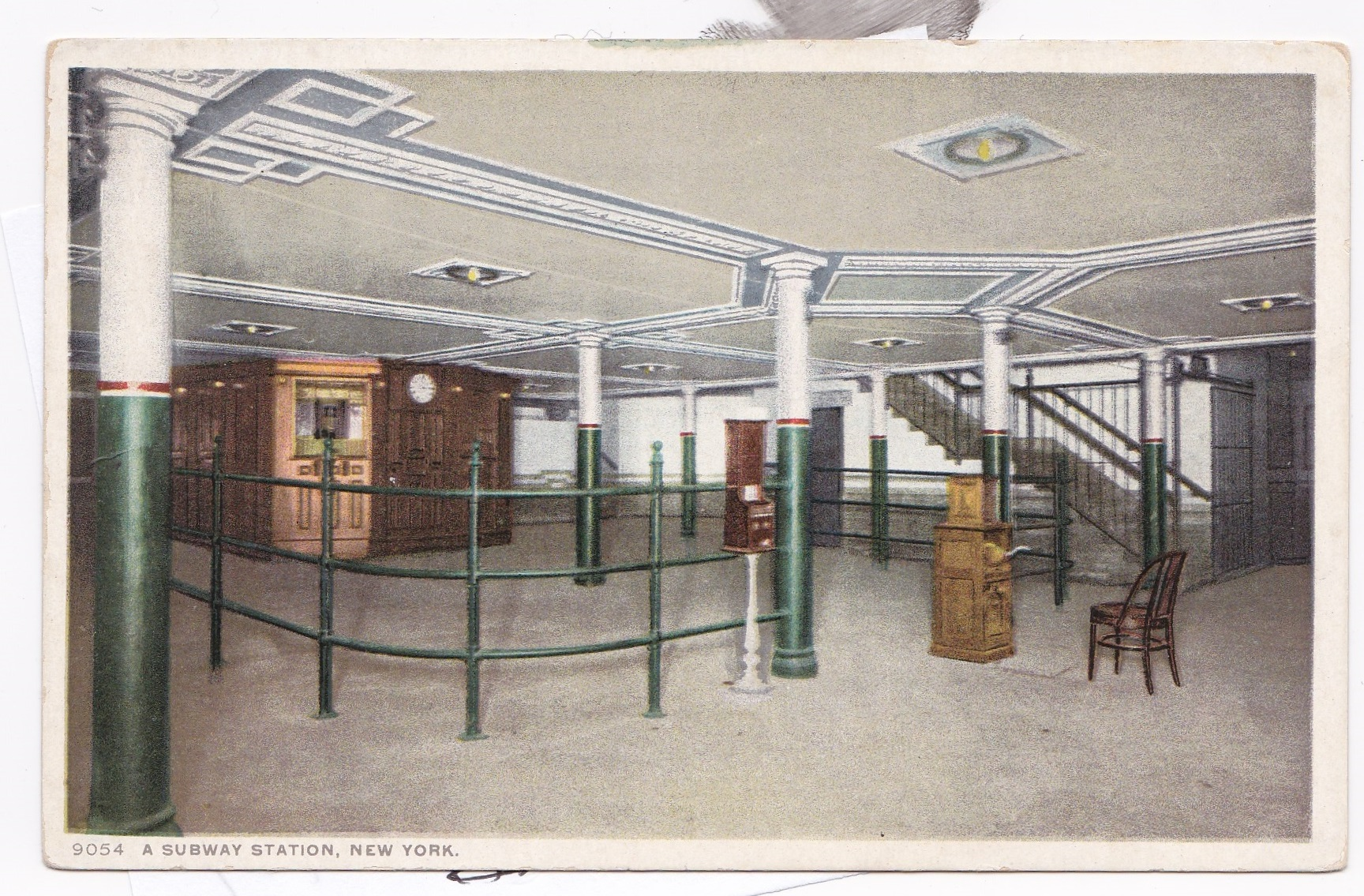
Entrance area with ticket booth and control

Like other local stations, 18th Street has four tracks and two abandoned side platforms. The two local tracks, which formerly served the station, are used by the 6 train at all times, <6> trains during weekdays in the peak direction, and the 4 train during late nights. The two express tracks are used by the 4 and 5 trains during daytime hours. The platforms were 200 feet (61 m) long, like at other local stations on the original IRT.

As with other stations built as part of the original IRT, the station was constructed using a cut-and-cover method. The tunnel is covered by a U-shaped trough that contains utility pipes and wires. This trough contains a foundation of concrete no less than 4 inches (100 mm) thick. Each former platform consists of 3-inch-thick (7.6 cm) concrete slabs, beneath which are drainage basins. The former platforms contain circular, cast-iron Doric-style columns spaced every 15 feet (4.6 m). Additional columns between the tracks, spaced every 5 feet (1.5 m), support the jack-arched concrete station roofs. There is a 1-inch (25 mm) gap between the trough wall and the platform walls, which are made of 4-inch (100 mm)-thick brick covered over by a tiled finish.

The decorative scheme consisted of blue/green tile tablets, buff and violet tile bands, a violet faience cornice, and green faience plaques. The mosaic tiles at all original IRT stations were manufactured by the American Encaustic Tile Company, which subcontracted the installations at each station. The decorative work was performed by tile contractor Manhattan Glass Tile Company and faience contractor Grueby Faience Company. The 18th Street station is fairly well preserved, with the exception of graffiti and some litter.

== See also ==
- Worth Street station
- 91st Street station (IRT Broadway–Seventh Avenue Line)
