= 14th Street–Union Square station =

New York City Subway station in Manhattan

14 Street–Union Square
- New York City Subway station complex
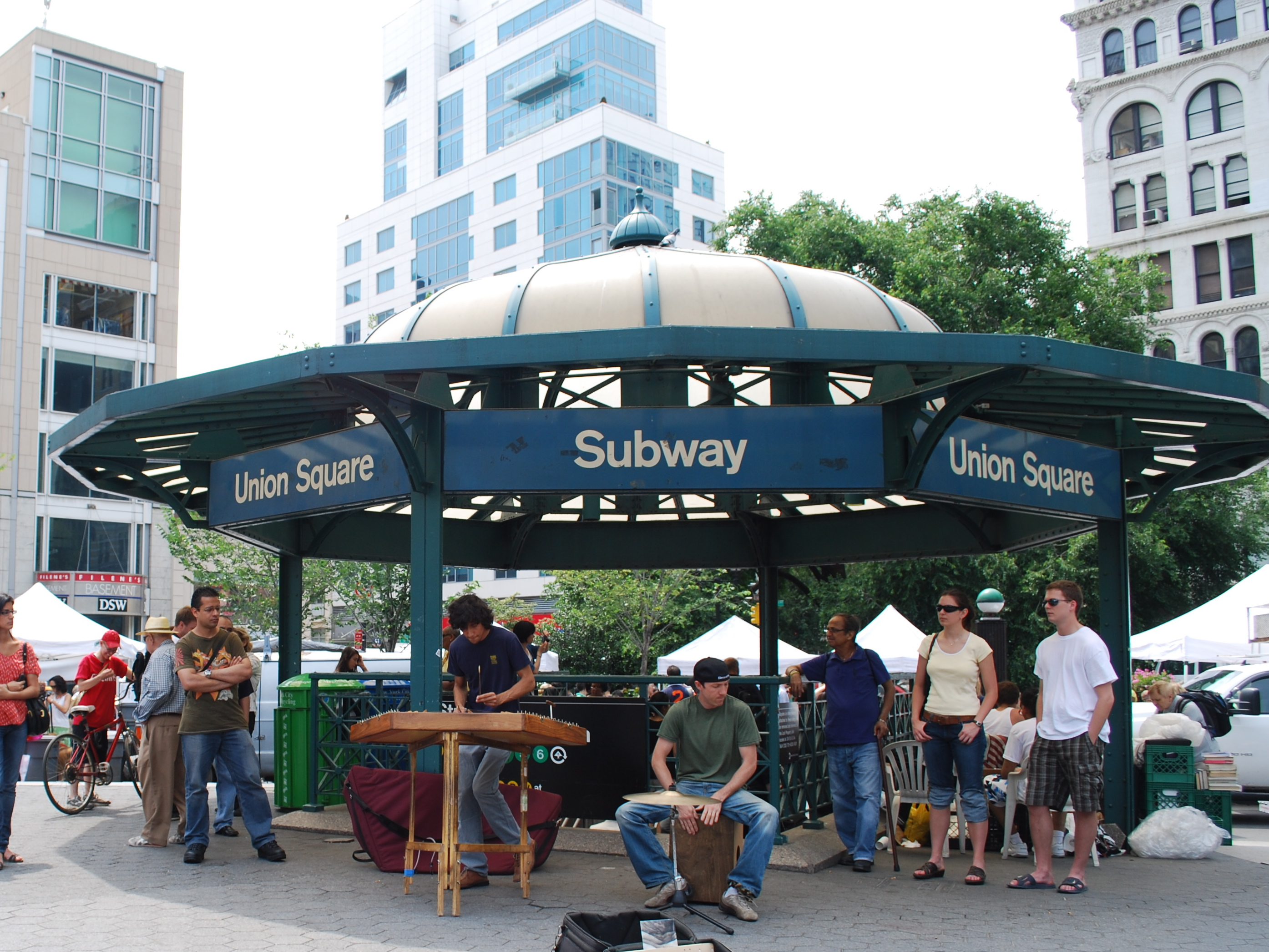
- Station entrance within Union Square Park

Station statistics
- Address: East 14th Street, Park Avenue South & Broadway; New York, New York
- Borough: Manhattan
- Locale: Union Square
- Coordinates: 40°44′05″N 73°59′25″W
- Division: A (IRT), B (BMT)
- Line: BMT Broadway Line; BMT Canarsie Line; IRT Lexington Avenue Line
- Services: 4 (all times); 5 (all times except late nights); 6 (all times) <6> (weekdays until 8:45 p.m., peak direction); L (all times); N (all times); Q (all times); R (all except late nights); W (weekdays only)
- Transit: NYCT Bus: M1, M2, M3, M14A SBS, M14D SBS, X27, X28, SIM1C, SIM3C, SIM4C, SIM7, SIM9, SIM33, SIM33C
- Structure: Underground
- Levels: 3

Other information
- Opened: July 1, 1948 (78 years ago)
- Accessible: Partially (BMT Broadway Line & BMT Canarsie Line platforms only)

Traffic
- 2025: 24,316,583 ▲7%
- Rank: 4 out of 423
Location
Location within New York City Subway
Location within New York City
Location within New York
Street map
Station service legend
Symbol	Description
Stops all times except late nights	Stops all times except late nights
Stops all times	Stops all times
Stops weekdays during the day	Stops weekdays during the day
Stops rush hours in the peak direction only	Stops rush hours in the peak direction only
- 14th Street–Union Square Subway Station (IRT; Dual System BMT)
- U.S. National Register of Historic Places
- New York State Register of Historic Places
- MPS: New York City Subway System MPS
- NRHP reference No.: 05000671
- NYSRHP No.: 06101.015188

Significant dates
- Added to NRHP: July 6, 2005
- Designated NYSRHP: May 11, 2005

The 14th Street–Union Square station is a major New York City Subway station complex shared by the BMT Broadway Line, the BMT Canarsie Line and the IRT Lexington Avenue Line. It is located at the intersection of Fourth Avenue and 14th Street, underneath Union Square Park in Manhattan. The complex is near the border of several neighborhoods, including the East Village to the southeast, Greenwich Village to the south and southwest, Chelsea to the northwest, and both the Flatiron District and Gramercy Park to the north and northeast. The 14th Street–Union Square station is served by the 4, 6, L, N, and Q trains at all times; the 5 and R trains at all times except late nights; the W train on weekdays; and the <6> train weekdays in the peak direction.

The Lexington Avenue Line platforms were built for the Interborough Rapid Transit Company (IRT) as an express station on the city's first subway line, which was approved in 1900. The station opened on October 27, 1904, as one of the original 28 stations of the New York City Subway. As part of the Dual Contracts, the Broadway Line platforms opened in 1917 and the Canarsie Line platform opened in 1924. Several modifications have been made to the stations over the years, and they were combined on July 1, 1948. The complex was renovated in the 1990s and was placed on the National Register of Historic Places in 2005.

The Lexington Avenue Line station has two abandoned side platforms, two island platforms, and four tracks, while the parallel Broadway Line station has two island platforms and four tracks. The Canarsie Line station, crossing under both of the other stations, has one island platform and two tracks. Numerous elevators make most of the complex, except for the Lexington Avenue Line station, compliant with the Americans with Disabilities Act of 1990 (ADA). There is also a New York City Police Department (NYPD) transit precinct at the station. In 2019, over 32 million passengers entered this station, making it the fourth-busiest station in the system.

According to Gothamist, the station "notoriously" has the highest temperatures of all stations in the New York City Subway.

== History ==
=== First subway ===
Views of the 14th Street IRT station in 1904

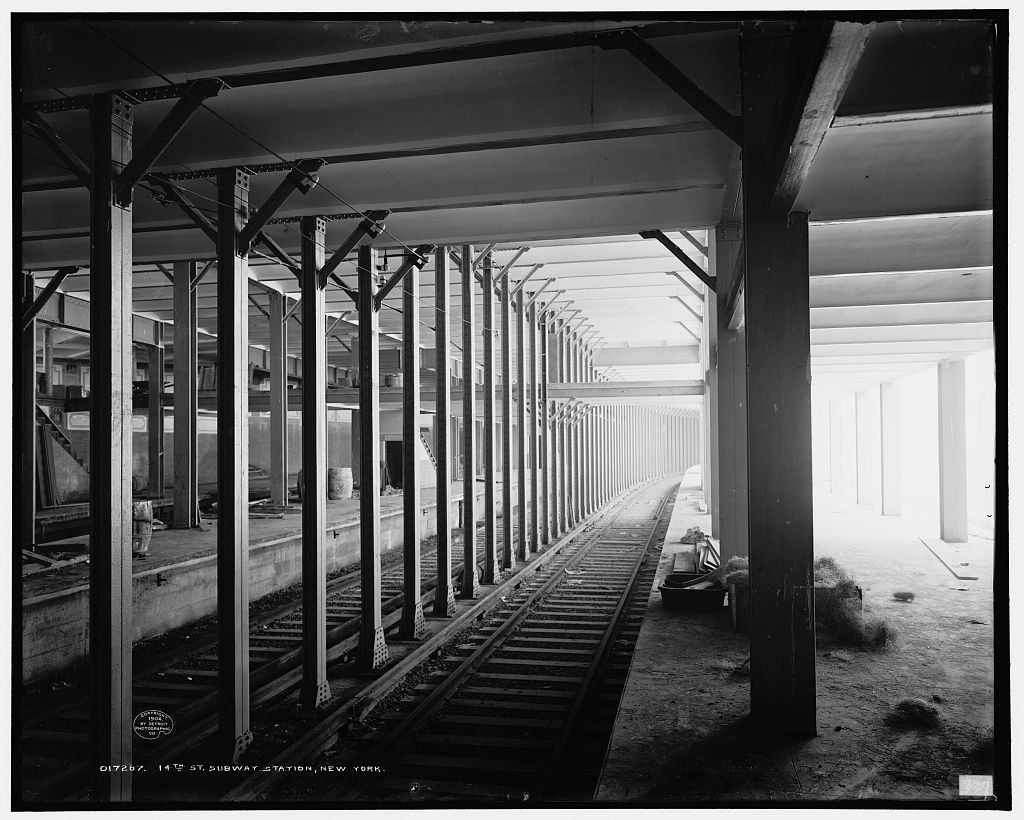
Under construction

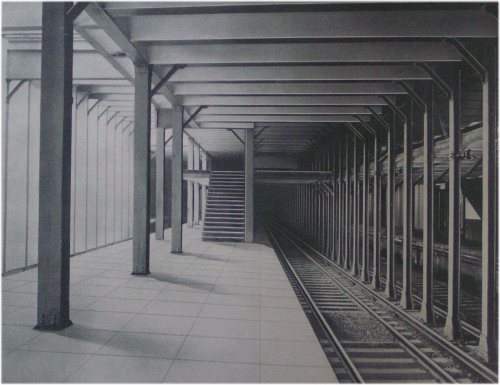
Just prior to opening

Planning for a subway line in New York City dates to 1864. However, development of what would become the city's first subway line did not start until 1894, when the New York State Legislature passed the Rapid Transit Act. The subway plans were drawn up by a team of engineers led by William Barclay Parsons, chief engineer of the Rapid Transit Commission. It called for a subway line from New York City Hall in lower Manhattan to the Upper West Side, where two branches would lead north into the Bronx. A plan was formally adopted in 1897, and all legal conflicts over the route alignment were resolved near the end of 1899. The Rapid Transit Construction Company, organized by John B. McDonald and funded by August Belmont Jr., signed the initial Contract 1 with the Rapid Transit Commission in February 1900, in which it would construct the subway and maintain a 50-year operating lease from the opening of the line. In 1901, the firm of Heins & LaFarge was hired to design the underground stations. Belmont incorporated the Interborough Rapid Transit Company (IRT) in April 1902 to operate the subway.

The 14th Street station was constructed as part of the route segment from Great Jones Street to 41st Street. Construction on this section of the line began on September 12, 1900. The section from Great Jones Street to a point 100 feet (30 m) north of 33rd Street was awarded to Holbrook, Cabot & Daly Contracting Company. Two streetcar tracks on Union Square East were temporarily relocated to one side of the street while contractors excavated through solid rock on the site. During the line's construction, the contractors installed a temporary compressed-air plant in Union Square, prompting a lawsuit from the operator of a nearby hotel. The New York Court of Appeals ruled in 1902 that the contractors had to disassemble the compressed-air plant and to stop storing materials in Union Square Park. By late 1903, the subway was nearly complete, but the IRT Powerhouse and the system's electrical substations were still under construction, delaying the system's opening. The 14th Street station opened on October 27, 1904, as one of the original 28 stations of the New York City Subway from City Hall to 145th Street on the Broadway–Seventh Avenue Line.

The opening of the 14th Street station turned Union Square into a major transportation hub. With the northward relocation of the city's theater district, Union Square became a major wholesaling district with several loft buildings, as well as numerous office buildings. Initially, the IRT station was served by local and express trains along both the West Side (now the Broadway–Seventh Avenue Line to Van Cortlandt Park–242nd Street) and East Side (now the Lenox Avenue Line). West Side local trains had their southern terminus at City Hall during rush hours and South Ferry at other times, and had their northern terminus at 242nd Street. East Side local trains ran from City Hall to Lenox Avenue (145th Street). Express trains had their southern terminus at South Ferry or Atlantic Avenue and had their northern terminus at 242nd Street, Lenox Avenue (145th Street), or West Farms (180th Street). Express trains to 145th Street were later eliminated, and West Farms express trains and rush-hour Broadway express trains operated through to Brooklyn. As part of an experiment to improve the subway line's ventilation, the Rapid Transit Commission installed large fans at the 14th Street station in July 1905.

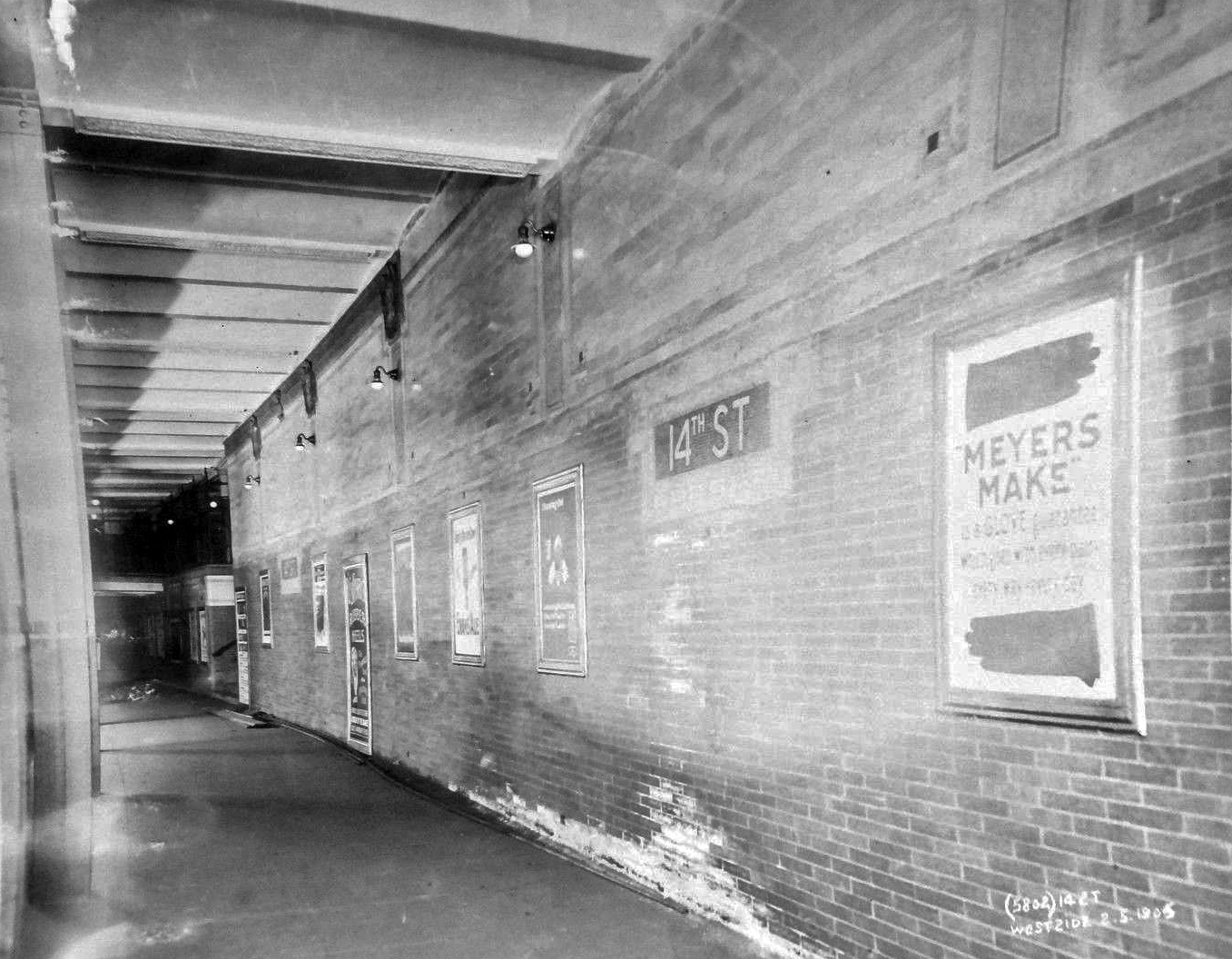
A view of the now-closed side platform at 14th Street in 1905

To address overcrowding, in 1909, the New York Public Service Commission proposed lengthening the platforms at stations along the original IRT subway. As part of a modification to the IRT's construction contracts made on January 18, 1910, the company was to lengthen station platforms to accommodate ten-car express and six-car local trains. In addition to $1.5 million (equivalent to $51.8 million in 2025) spent on platform lengthening, $500,000 (equivalent to $17.3 million in 2025) was spent on building additional entrances and exits. It was anticipated that these improvements would increase capacity by 25 percent. At the 14th Street station, the northbound island platform was extended 55 feet (17 m) north and 100 feet (30 m) south, while the southbound island platform was extended 128 feet (39 m) north, necessitating the replacement of some structural steel north of the intersection of Fourth Avenue and 13th Street. Gap fillers were added to the southbound island platform at this time. Six-car local trains began operating in October 1910. On January 23, 1911, ten-car express trains began running on the Lenox Avenue Line, and the next day, ten-car express trains were inaugurated on the West Side Line. In 1918, the Lexington Avenue Line opened north of Grand Central–42nd Street, and the original line was divided into an H-shaped system. All trains at the 14th Street–Union Square station were sent via the Lexington Avenue Line.

=== Dual Contracts ===
After the original IRT opened, the city began planning new lines. The New York Public Service Commission adopted plans for what was known as the Broadway–Lexington Avenue route (later the Broadway Line) on December 31, 1907. A proposed Tri-borough system was adopted in early 1908, incorporating the Broadway Line. Operation of the line was assigned to the Brooklyn Rapid Transit Company (BRT; after 1923, the Brooklyn–Manhattan Transit Corporation or BMT) in the Dual Contracts, adopted on March 4, 1913. The Dual Contracts also entailed a subway route under 14th Street, to run to Canarsie in Brooklyn; this became the BMT's Canarsie Line.

==== Broadway Line ====
In May 1913, the Public Service Commission began receiving bids for Section 4 of the Broadway Line, between Houston Street and Union Square. This was the first construction contract to be placed for bidding after the Dual Contracts had been signed. The next month, the Dock Contractor Company submitted a low bid of $2.578 million. This section was to include a station at Union Square between 14th and 16th Streets. Local civic group Broadway Association and various property owners objected to the fact that Dock Contractor was to receive the contract, citing the firm's lack of experience. The Public Service Commission approved Dock Contractor's bid despite these objections, and the contract was awarded later that month. The section between 16th and 26th Streets was awarded to the E. E. Smith Construction Company in September 1913 for $2.057 million (equivalent to $67.008 million in 2025).

From the outset, the 14th Street–Union Square station was intended as an express station on the Broadway Line. To save money, the station was built using an open cut method. A 120-foot-wide (37 m) strip of land, running diagonally through Union Square Park, was closed and excavated. By late 1913, large portions of Union Square Park had been demolished for the construction of the Broadway Line's Union Square station. New York City's parks commissioner promised members of the public that the park would be remodeled after the station was finished. Because the Dual Contracts specified that the street surfaces needed to remain intact during the system's construction, a temporary web of timber supports was erected to support the streets overhead while the BMT platforms were being constructed.

The Broadway Line south of 14th Street was near completion by February 1916, and workers began restoring the section of Union Square Park above the 14th Street station. The same month, the Public Service Commission began accepting bids for the installation of finishes at seven stations on the Broadway Line from Rector Street to 14th Street. D. C. Gerber submitted a $346,000 low bid for the finishes. The section of the line north of 14th Street, by contrast, was still incomplete. Although it was technically possible for the BRT to terminate trains at Union Square, the line would not be profitable until it was extended at least to 34th Street. The Broadway Line's 14th Street–Union Square station opened on September 4, 1917, as the northern terminus of the first section of the line between 14th Street and Canal Street. Initially, it only served local trains. Within three months of the Broadway Line station's opening, the 14th Street–Union Square station recorded more daily passengers than either the Grand Central–42nd Street station or the Brooklyn Bridge–Chambers Street station, leading Women's Wear to describe the Union Square complex as "probably the world's greatest underground traffic point".

On January 5, 1918, the Broadway Line was extended north to Times Square–42nd Street and south to Rector Street, and express service started on the line. For about three weeks, a shuttle service ran between Union Square and Times Square. Local trains from Brooklyn began running through to Times Square on January 27. While local trains terminated at the Times Square station, express trains from Brooklyn continued to terminate at Union Square until a northward extension to 57th Street opened in July 1919, allowing express trains to operate to Times Square. To aid navigation, in 1920, the BRT installed illuminated signs on the southbound platforms of Union Square and two other Broadway Line stations.

==== Canarsie Line ====
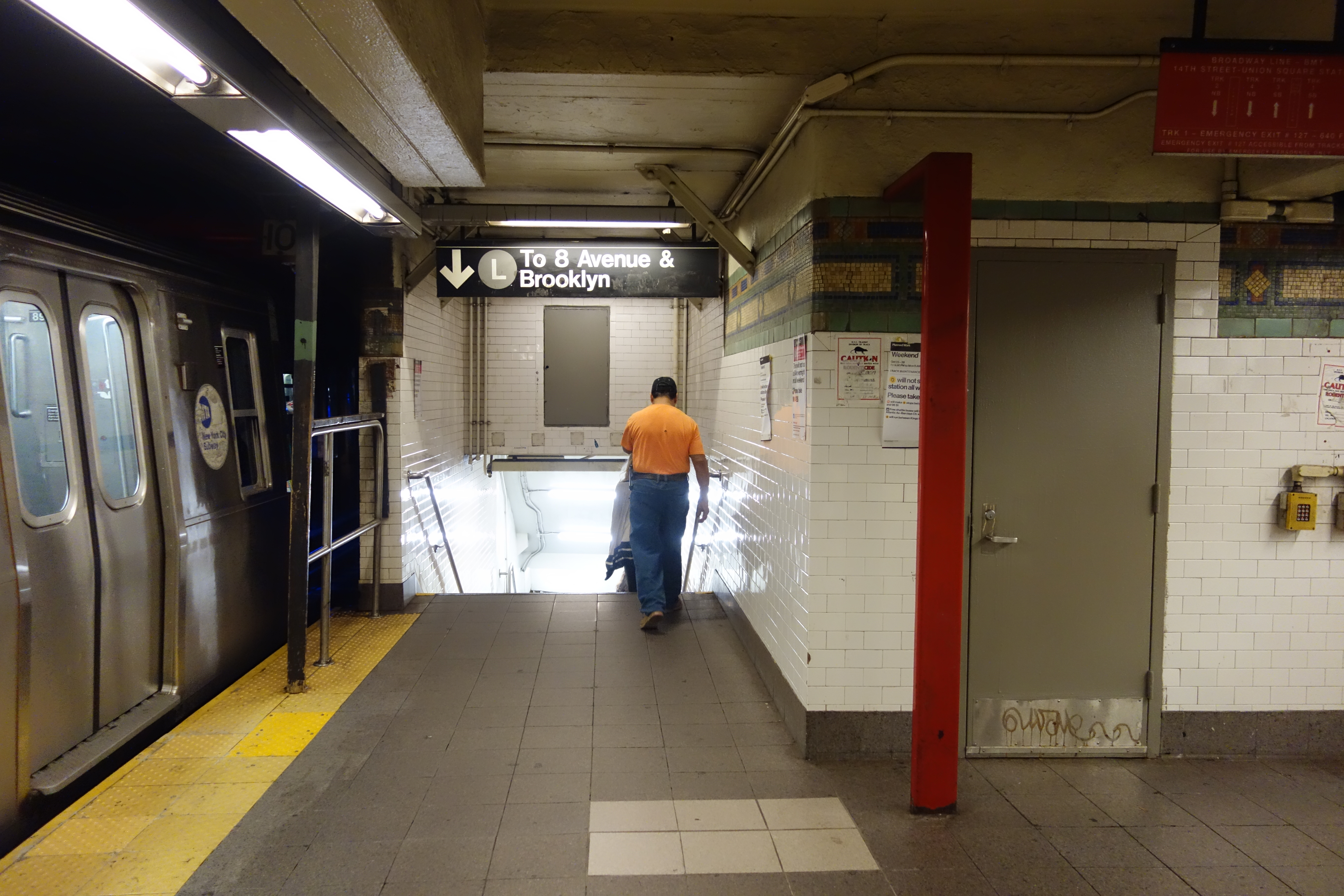
Staircase connecting one of the Broadway Line platforms to the Canarsie Line platform

At Union Square, the BRT's Canarsie Line was to pass under both the Broadway and Lexington Avenue lines. Booth and Flinn was awarded the first contract for the line, namely a tunnel under the East River, in January 1916. At the time, the Public Service Commission was completing plans for the rest of the line; the commission began accepting bids for two parts of the line within Manhattan, sections 1 and 2. in April 1916. The next month, Booth and Flinn won the contract for section 1, which was to cost $2.528 million (equivalent to $74.796 million in 2025). By early 1919, the section of the line under 14th Street was about 20 percent completed.

In 1922, the Charles H. Brown & Son Corporation was contracted to build out the Canarsie Line's stations in Manhattan, including the Union Square station. Track-laying in the tunnels between Sixth and Montrose Avenues started in the last week of October 1922. A passageway between the Broadway and Canarsie Line stations at Union Square was completed in late 1923. The Canarsie Line station at Union Square opened on June 30, 1924, as the second-westernmost stop on the 14th Street–Eastern Line, which ran from Sixth Avenue under the East River and through Williamsburg to Montrose and Bushwick Avenues. Service was extended east to Canarsie on July 14, 1928, stopping at Union Square. The extension of service to Canarsie and Sixth Avenue reduced overcrowding at the Canal Street station in Lower Manhattan.

==== 1920s and 1930s modifications ====
In 1922, the Rapid Transit Commission awarded a contract to the Wagner Engineering Company for the installation of navigational signs at the Union Square station and several other major subway stations. The IRT platforms received blue-and-white signs, while the BMT platforms received red-white-and-green navigational signs. The Broadway Line station's platforms originally could only fit six 67-foot-long (20 m) cars. In 1926, the New York City Board of Transportation (BOT) received bids for the lengthening of platforms at nine stations on the Broadway Line, including the 14th Street station, to accommodate eight-car trains. Edwards & Flood submitted a low bid of $101,750 for the project. The platform-lengthening project was completed in 1927, bringing the length of the Broadway Line platforms to 535 feet (163 m).

In May 1928, the New York City Board of Estimate awarded a $607,223 contract to improve transfers between the Canarsie and Broadway lines at Union Square, which was expected to help relieve crowding at Canal Street. The low bidder was the Hart & Early Co. Work on the transfer between the Broadway and Canarsie lines began that August. The project involved constructing a 30,000-square-foot (2,800 m^{2}) mezzanine and raising and re-landscaping the adjacent portion of Union Square Park to provide enough headroom. Existing statues in the park were relocated as part of improvements to the park. In addition, the contractor added twelve stairs from the mezzanine to the Broadway Line platforms and twelve stairs from the mezzanine to the Canarsie Line platform. The mezzanine and stairs were intended to accommodate 2,000 passengers per minute in either direction, and the rebuilt station would be capable of accommodating 50 million passengers per year. At the time, the Union Square station was one of the city's busiest, with 52 million annual passengers. The renovation was nearly completed by mid-1931.

=== Later years ===
==== 1940s to 1970s ====
The city government took over the BMT's operations on June 1, 1940, and the IRT's operations on June 12. In September 1945, the New York City Club presented a proposal for improving service on the IRT Lexington Avenue Line. The 14th Street–Union Square station on the IRT line would have been relocated about 500 feet (150 m) northward, requiring the closure of the 18th Street station. Since the plan entailed having local trains terminate at 14th Street instead of at City Hall, the local platforms would be rebuilt at a lower level, with a crossover next to the station. In addition, all local trains would be lengthened from six to ten cars. This plan was not implemented. The transfer between the IRT and BMT platforms was placed inside fare control on July 1, 1948. As part of a pilot program, the BOT installed three-dimensional advertisements at the Union Square station in late 1948. The BOT studied the feasibility of building an underpass from the station to the eastern side of Union Square East at 15th Street in January 1949, and Loft Inc. opened a candy store in the BMT mezzanine that April.

During 1956, the Central Savings Bank and Union Square Savings Bank both opened branches on the Union Square station's mezzanine. The New York City Transit Authority (NYCTA) lengthened both of the Lexington Avenue Line platforms by 150 feet (46 m) as part of a $1.3 million project that was completed at the beginning of 1958. After the extensions were completed, the NYCTA began requiring that, during PM rush hours, alighting Lexington Avenue Line riders use only one of the staircases on the northbound platform to reduce congestion. In the 1960s, the NYCTA started a project to lengthen station platforms on the Broadway Line to 615 feet (187 m) to accommodate 10-car trains. As part of the project, the Broadway Line platforms at Union Square were extended 85 feet (26 m) to the north. Additionally, the NYCTA installed a closed-circuit television system on the Lexington Avenue Line platforms in 1965 as part of a pilot program to deter crime there.

Efforts were made to renovate the Union Square station during the late 1970s as part of an effort to redevelop the area around Union Square. During this time, $1.2 million was raised for a renovation of the Union Square station. This included $120,000 raised by the 14th Street–Union Square Area Project and the Metropolitan Transportation Authority (MTA), as well as $900,000 from the federal government. The renovation, which was limited to the complex's mezzanine level, coincided with the original IRT line's 75th anniversary. Local civic groups, the MTA, and the New York City Transit Authority began soliciting bids for the station's renovation in December 1978. The project included relocating turnstiles away from hallways, closing or straightening some passageways, removing most concession stands, and relocating a district headquarters for the New York City Transit Police to the station. The renovation, which had been completed by 1980, was one of the first such projects conducted through the MTA's Adopt-a-Station program.

==== 1980s and early 1990s ====
The MTA evicted 25 businesses, who occupied a combined 8,000 square feet (740 m^{2}), from the station's mezzanine in 1981 to free up space. That year, the MTA listed the Union Square station on the Lexington Avenue Line among the 69 most deteriorated stations in the subway system. The MTA provided funding for a further renovation of the Union Square station in its 1985–1989 capital plan. By 1982, the entrances in the southern portion of Union Square were to be renovated as part of a refurbishment of Union Square Park. The entrances had been renovated by 1985. The MTA also renovated 10,600 square feet (980 m^{2}) of storefronts at the station in 1984. Seven storefronts received glass enclosures.

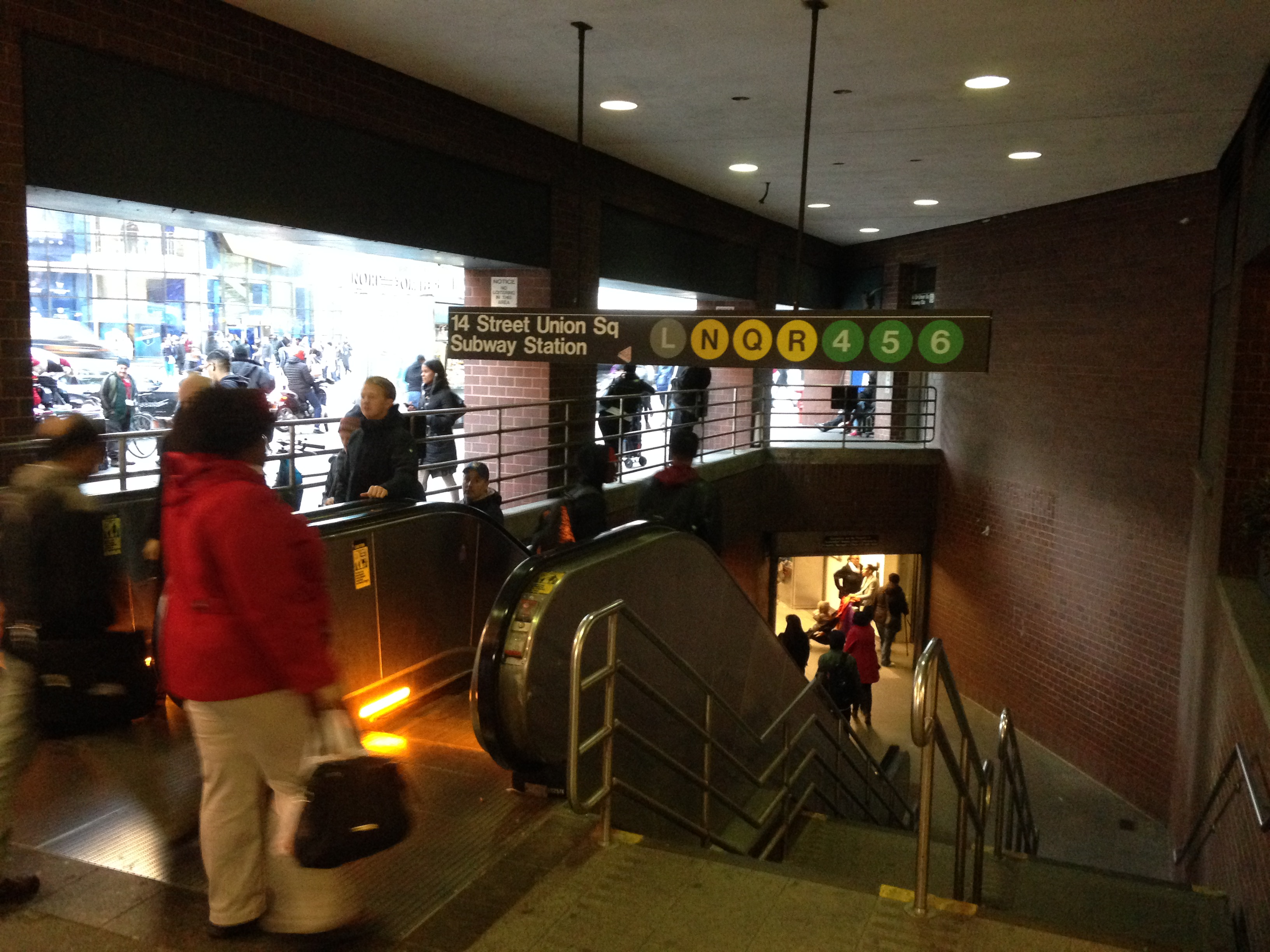
The subway entrance in the Zeckendorf Towers

During the mid-1980s, the New York City Department of City Planning prepared zoning guidelines for the Union Square area, which would allow a greater maximum floor area ratio in exchange for subway improvements. William Zeckendorf, who was developing the adjacent Zeckendorf Towers, agreed in 1984 to build and maintain subway entrances within Zeckendorf Towers as "a public benefit", in exchange for being allowed to increase the towers' floor area by 20 percent. This was because of zoning rules that required many developers in Lower Manhattan, Midtown Manhattan, and Downtown Brooklyn to relocate and maintain subway entrances that were formerly on the street. In exchange for adding and maintaining an entrance with escalators and elevators at the building's base, Zeckendorf was allowed to add 153,006 square feet (14,214.7 m^{2}) to his building. The Zeckendorf plan received some opposition from members of the public but was approved by the New York City Board of Estimate in early 1985. As part of the construction of Zeckendorf Towers the 14th Street–Union Square station was partially renovated in the late 1980s. The modifications included a modification of the mezzanine, a new station entrance with escalators under Zeckendorf Towers, and a new station entrance at 15th Street. In addition, to speed up passenger flow, dozens of platform conductors were assigned to direct crowds on the Lexington Avenue Line platforms during the late 1980s.

On August 28, 1991, an accident just north of the IRT station killed five passengers and injured 215 others in one of the deadliest incidents in New York City Subway history. The derailment occurred at the entry to a former pocket track on the Lexington Avenue Line station, which was removed after the accident. The operator of a southbound 4 train was supposed to switch to the local track because the express track was being repaired. The train was traveling 40 mph (64 km/h) in a 10 mph (16 km/h) zone, and the train derailed after the first car traveled through the switch. Five cars were damaged heavily, being scrapped on site, and the track infrastructure suffered heavy structural damage as a result. The entire infrastructure, including signals, switches, track, roadbed, cabling, and 23 support columns were replaced.

==== 1990s renovation ====
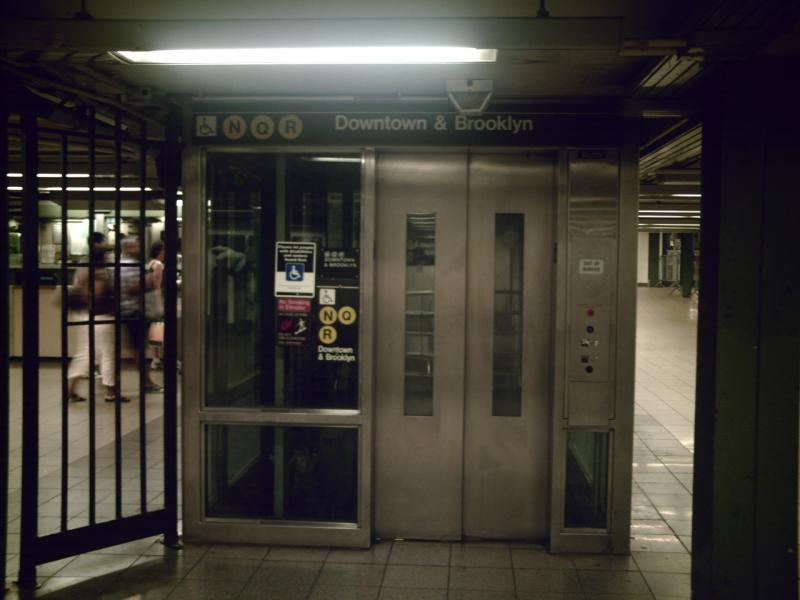
An elevator from the mezzanine to the southbound Broadway Line platform, one of several installed in the station's renovation during the 1990s and 2000s

In April 1993, the New York State Legislature agreed to give the MTA $9.6 billion for capital improvements. Some of the funds would be used to renovate nearly one hundred New York City Subway stations, including all three stations at 14th Street–Union Square. On July 9, 1993, the contract for the project's design was awarded for $2.993 million. As part of the contract, the consultant investigated whether the MTA could reconfigure the IRT passageway, reframe the exit structure on the Lexington Avenue platforms to accommodate the relocation and widening of stairs, build a new fan room, remove stairs on the Broadway Line platforms, reframe the existing structure, and rebuild a new staircase between the intermediate and IRT mezzanines. After the consultant deemed that all of these modifications were feasible, in May 1994, the MTA and the consultant reached a supplemental agreement worth $984,998 to allow the consultant to prepare designs. Lee Harris Pomeroy prepared plans for the project, which was to cost $38.5 million and start in December 1994, with a new entrance pavilion and elevator on the southeast corner of Union Square Park. The same year, a New York City Transit Police station opened in the Broadway Line mezzanine.

A construction contract was ultimately signed in March 1995, and NAB Construction Corp. was hired to renovate the station. As part of the project, power infrastructure was upgraded to allow the construction of MetroCard vending machine equipment. The station was also to receive color-coded signs (corresponding to the trunk colors of the services that stopped there), and six pieces of the station's original wall were to be displayed. The Union Square Greenmarket, directly above the station, was relocated during the renovation. By 1996, the renovation project was running behind schedule. The MTA had planned to install a forced-ventilation system in the station as part of a pilot program, but this was delayed. In addition, at least one staircase to the Canarsie Line platform was canceled, even though it would have relieved congestion. The MTA also canceled plans for a new subway entrance in Union Square Park because the New York City Department of Parks and Recreation (NYC Parks) refused to remove trees to make way for the entrance. Pomeroy claimed that NYC Parks would have had to remove one tree, while NYC Parks commissioner Henry Stern said the entrance would be expensive, inconveniently located, and require the removal of three trees.

During the late 1990s, the MTA had received $1.6 million from The Related Companies, which had developed a building on the site of two subway entrances at Broadway and 14th Street. Local residents requested that the MTA spend the money to improve pedestrian access around Union Square. Subsequently, mayor Rudy Giuliani announced plans in early 1998 to spend $2.6 million on an expansion of the park; the MTA agreed to contribute $400,000 toward the project. The expansion consisted of a pocket park in a traffic island at the southeast corner of Union Square, which was completed in 2000.

The MTA announced in 1999 that it would begin installing a forced-ventilation system above the IRT platforms at Union Square. The forced-ventilation system, consisting of 32 ceiling fans, was completed by July 2000 at a cost of $1 million. In addition, as part of a program to increase accessibility in the New York City Subway, the MTA had planned to install elevators to the Broadway Line and Canarsie Line platforms by 1998. These elevators were not completed until 2000. Furthermore, elevators to the Lexington Avenue Line platforms could not be installed because the portions of the platforms under the mezzanine were too narrow. The project, which was finished in 2001, cost $40 million and increased the station's public space by 30 percent.

==== 21st century ====
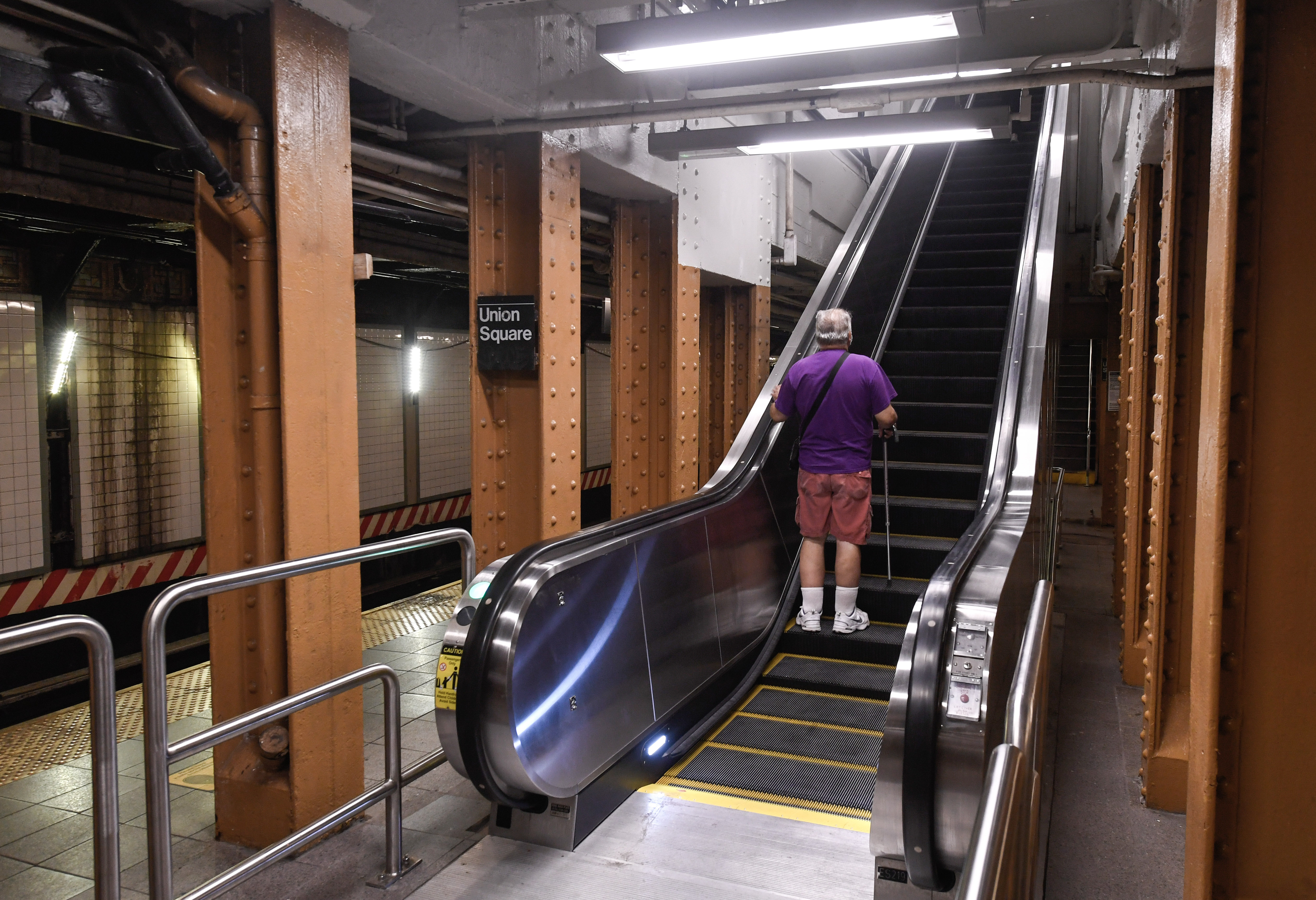
Escalator from the Canarsie Line platform to the IRT

The station's token booths were shuttered in May 2005, after fare tokens were replaced with MetroCards; station agents were deployed elsewhere in the station to answer passengers' queries. This was part of a pilot program that was tested at seven other stations.

As part of the 2015–2019 MTA Capital Program and the L Project, several modifications were implemented on the platform to improve circulation and to reduce crowding. The stairs from the Broadway Line platforms were rebuilt in March 2019; the stair from the downtown Broadway Line platform was reconfigured entirely. Additionally, a new escalator was installed from the east mezzanine to the platform; it cost around $15 million and opened on September 10, 2020. The Union Square Partnership proposed a $100 million overhaul of Union Square in 2021; the plans included a new subway entrance with escalator and elevator access.

In April 2025, the MTA announced plans to install taller fare gates with glass panels at 20 stations, including the 14th Street–Union Square station. The fare gates would be manufactured by Cubic Transportation Systems, Conduent, Scheidt & Bachmann, and STraffic as part of a pilot program to reduce fare evasion. The MTA announced in late 2025 that a customer service center would open at the station. The new fare gates were not installed immediately; in October 2026, the MTA announced plans to install taller fare gates with glass panels at 20 additional stations, including the 14th Street–Union Square station, after the gates had been successfully piloted at earlier stations.

== Station layout ==
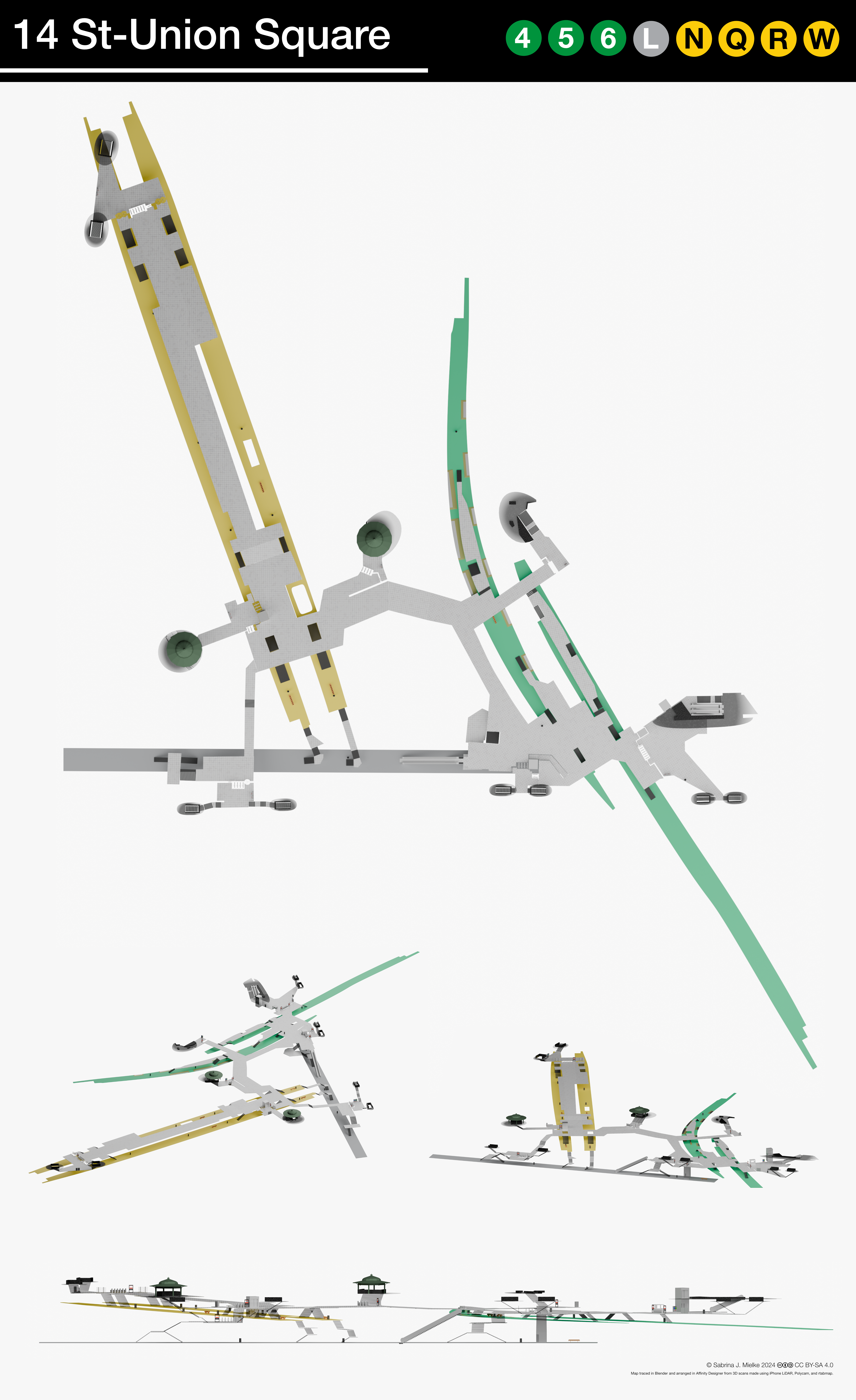
Map of the 14th Street–Union Square station

The IRT Lexington Avenue Line and BMT Broadway Line stations both run in a north–south direction and are both two levels below ground. The Lexington Avenue Line platforms are to the east, running under Fourth Avenue and Union Square East, while the Broadway Line platforms are to the west, running under Broadway and cutting directly under Union Square Park. The BMT Canarsie Line station runs west–east under both of the other stations, along 14th Street.

A 480-foot-long (150 m) mezzanine stretches above the BMT Broadway Line platforms, ramping down to a control area at its south end, where there are stairs down to the Broadway Line platforms and transfers to the other platforms. The tops of the mezzanine and passageway walls are decorated with friezes made of raised geometric patterns on rectangular tiles. White-on-green tiles with the number "14" are placed at the tops of the walls at regular intervals, while white-on-green "Union Square" tablets are installed below the friezes. Rectangular red metal frames also surround sections of the original wall. The mezzanine is relatively shallow, and because it was built with insufficient clearance, Union Square Park was raised by 4 feet (1.2 m) to accommodate the station. The precinct house of New York City Police Department (NYPD)'s Transit District 4 is located on the mezzanine.

Directly east of the control area at the south end of the BMT Broadway Line mezzanine, a 20-foot-wide (6 m) corridor slopes down to the IRT mezzanine. There are two overpasses above the IRT platforms, connecting the station complex with exits on the east side of both Fourth Avenue and Union Square East. Galleries extend from the overpasses above the platforms, with stairs leading downward from the galleries to each island platform. Original faience plaques with the number "14" are in the southern end of the IRT mezzanine, near one of the entrances. Other decorations, such as a pale blue frieze, date from later renovations. Storefronts, as well as steel and glass enclosures, are located near the Zeckendorf Towers.

A corridor runs above the western side of the IRT station, connecting the two overpasses. Prior to the 1990s renovation, this corridor had been used as storage space. Another staircase extends from the IRT mezzanine to a small mezzanine above the Canarsie Line platform. Another mezzanine on the western side of the station serves the Canarsie Line platform directly. There were several connecting passageways between the western Canarsie Line mezzanine and the larger concourse area above the Broadway Line. However, these passageways have been sealed off. The passageways to the Canarsie Line platform is decorated with cruciform borders similar to those in the other passageways.

=== Artwork ===
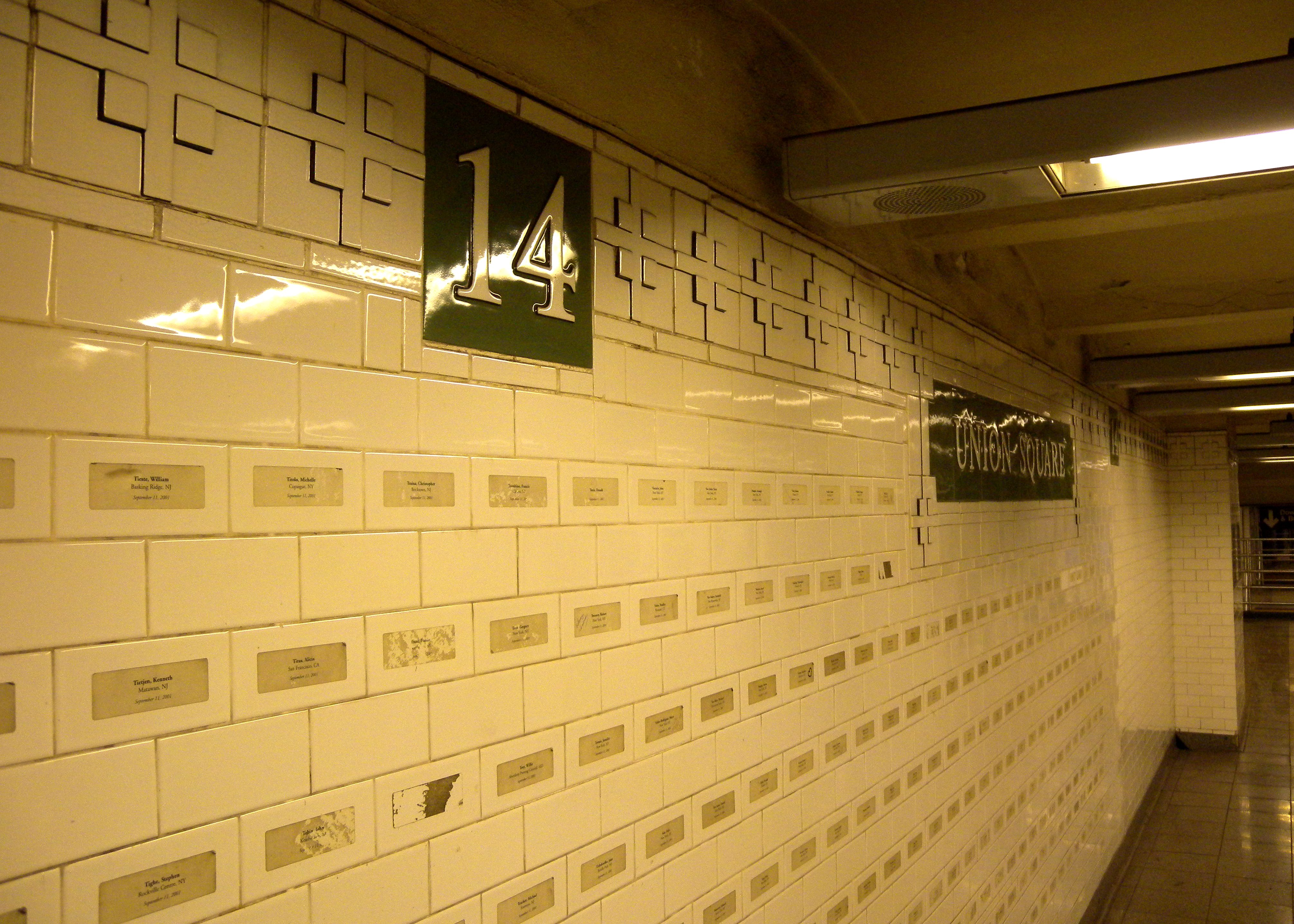
Tile name tablets on the mezzanine with names of September 11 attack victims

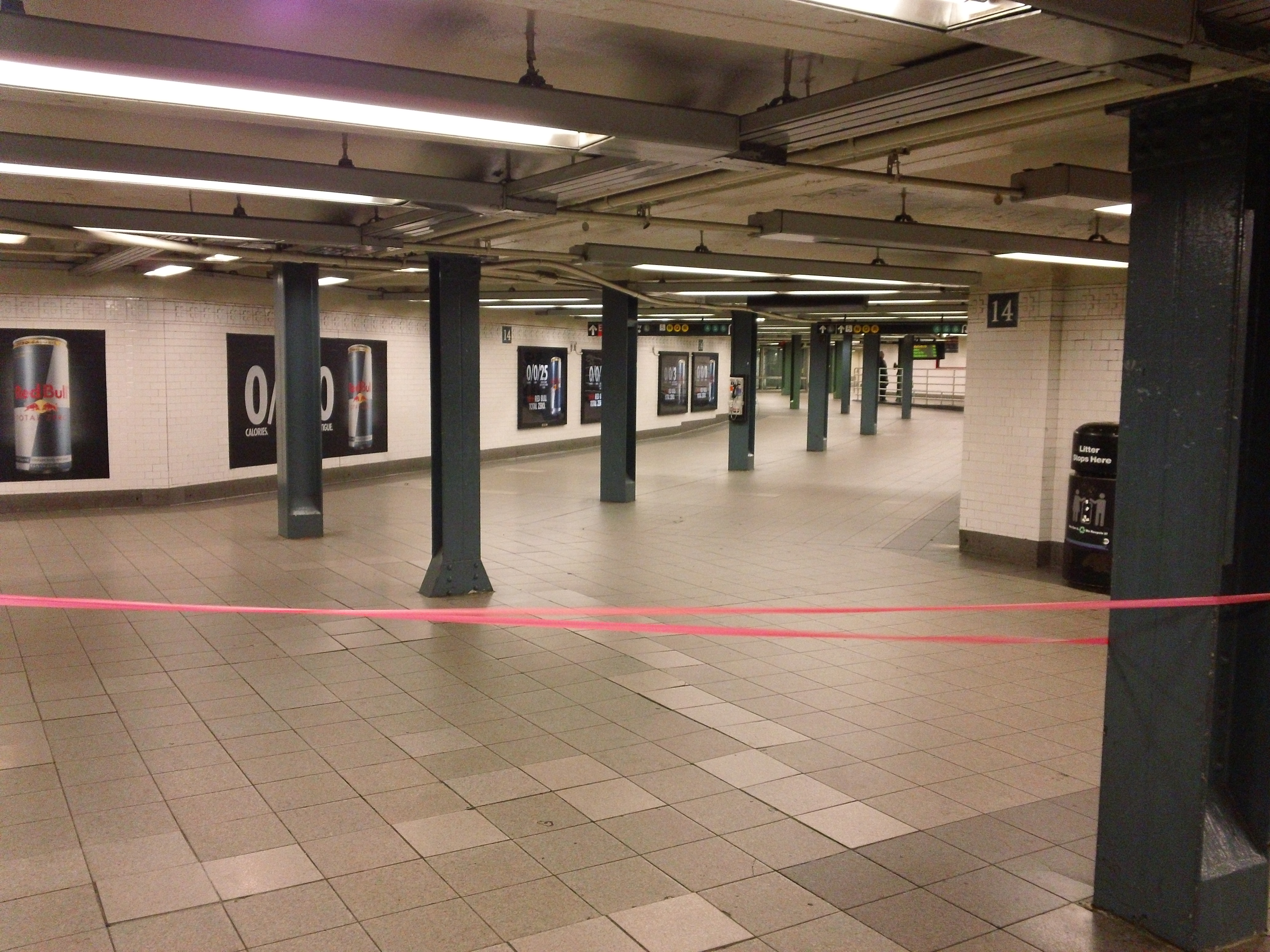
Corridor sloping up from the IRT to BMT mezzanines

Framing Union Square, by Mary Miss, is a station-wide art installation commissioned as part of the MTA Arts & Design program. It consists of six wall segments on the corridor above the western side of the IRT station, which were originally part of a double-height wall adjacent to the IRT station's southbound local platform. The wall segments have faience cornices, mosaic tile borders, and plaques of eagles. Bright red frames surround objects such as mosaics, cables, and bolts. According to Miss, the artwork was intended to invite "the public to look below the surface, to see a 'slice' of the station, its structure, its history". In 2005, an artwork called City Glow by Chiho Aoshima was installed within an advertising space at the station.

Imprinted on the walls of the BMT mezzanine are over 3,000 stickers with the names of victims of the September 11 attacks, which were put up by artist John Lin and sixteen friends on September 10, 2002. The stickers were not approved by the MTA and have deteriorated since they were placed. Another work of street art, a temporary wall of Post-it notes known as "Subway Therapy", appeared on the station's walls after Donald Trump was elected as U.S. president in 2016 but was removed after one month. "Subway Therapy" re-appeared at the station following Trump's 2024 reelection.

=== Exits ===
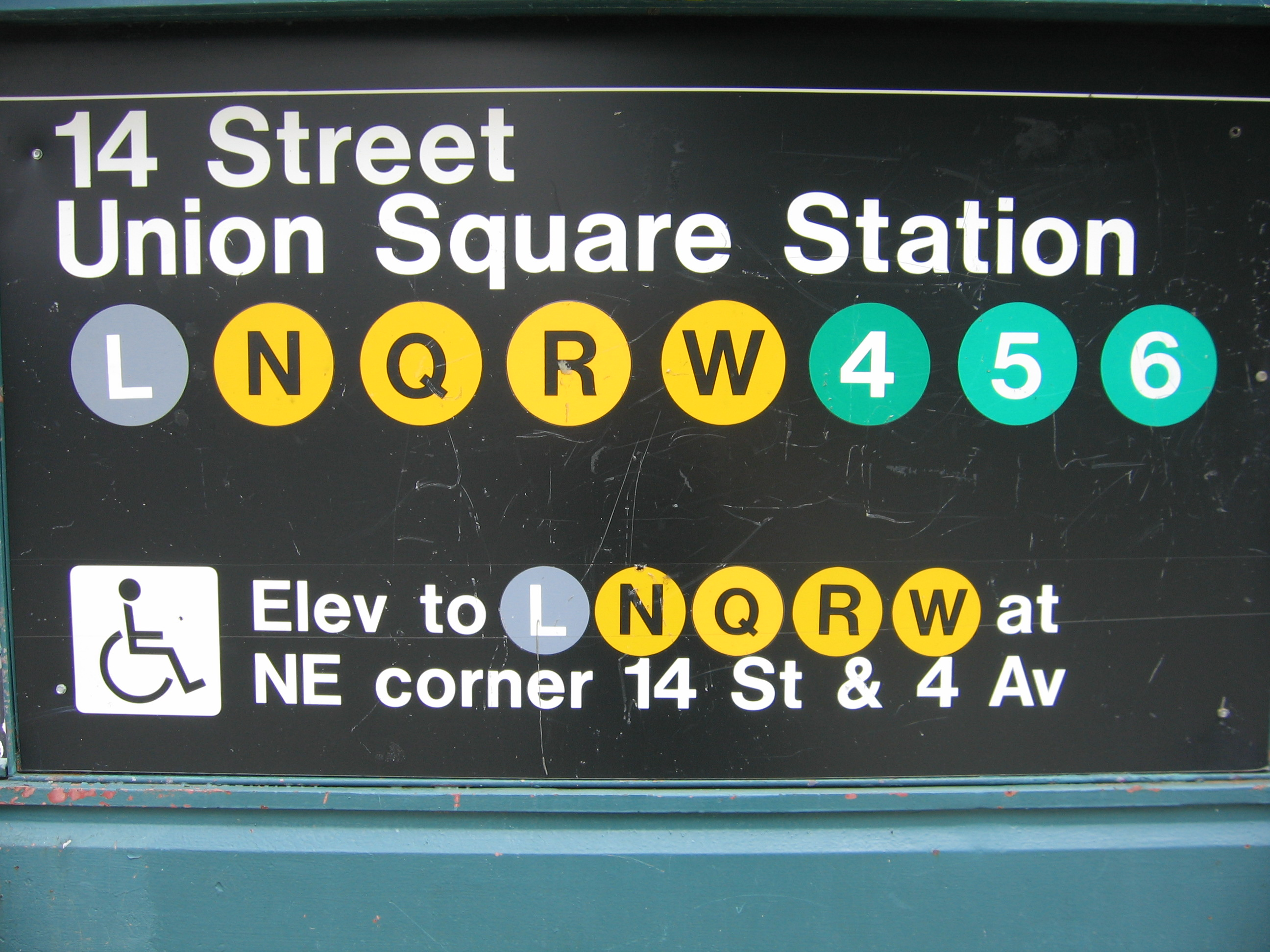
Station entrance sign

There are numerous entrances and exits to the station. An entrance with one stair, escalator bank, and elevator in the Zeckendorf Towers, at the northeast corner of 4th Avenue and 14th Street, connects with the southeast end of the station. This entrance provides people that comply with the Americans with Disabilities Act of 1990 (ADA) access to the station. The Zeckendorf Towers entrance is privately maintained; as of 2023, the escalators there had been among the least reliable in the New York City Subway system for several years. There are two stairs to each of the southwest and southeast corners of the same intersection. All of these lead directly to the Lexington Avenue Line mezzanine. One block to the west, two staircases on the south side of 14th Street between Broadway and University Place lead to the western Canarsie Line mezzanine. A closed exit extended to the west side of Broadway between 13th and 14th Streets.

The central portion of the station contains another exit from the Lexington Avenue Line mezzanine to the Zeckendorf Towers, which leads to the southeast corner of Union Square East and 15th Street. There are also two stairs inside Union Square Park between 14th and 15th Streets. One is closer to Union Square West between these two streets, opposite the equestrian statue of George Washington, while the other is closer to Union Square East and 15th Street. These entrances are closest to the Broadway Line station. The Union Square Park entrances contain large polygonal metal-and-glass canopies, which date from a 1985 renovation of the park.

At the northern end of the station, two stairs rise to Union Square Park on the east side of Union Square West at 16th Street. These lead directly to the Broadway Line mezzanine.

== IRT Lexington Avenue Line platforms ==
14 Street–Union Square
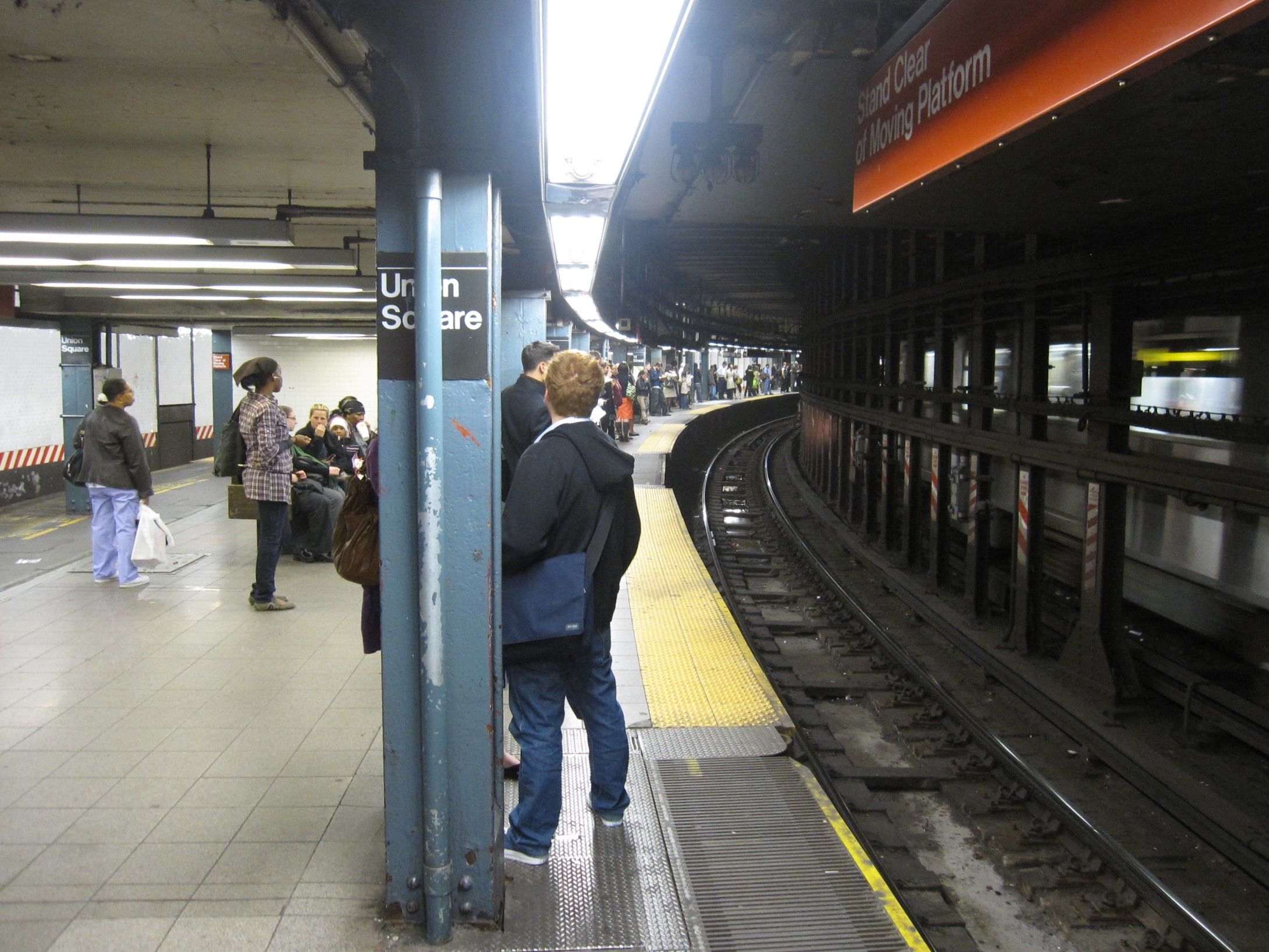
- Downtown platform for the local services (left) and express services (right), showing the curvature of the station and the gap fillers

Station statistics
- Division: A (IRT)
- Line: IRT Lexington Avenue Line
- Services: 4 (all times); 5 (all times except late nights); 6 (all times) <6> (weekdays until 8:45 p.m., peak direction)
- Platforms: 2 island platforms (in service) cross-platform interchange 2 side platforms (abandoned)
- Tracks: 4

Other information
- Opened: October 27, 1904 (122 years ago)
- Accessible: Partially; access to mezzanine only, platforms not accessible
- Accessibility: Cross-platform transfer available
Services
Preceding station	New York City Subway	Following station
Grand Central–42nd Street 4 5 via 138th Street–Grand Concourse	Express	Brooklyn Bridge–City Hall 4 5 via Franklin Avenue–Medgar Evers College
23rd Street–Baruch College 4 6 <6> toward Pelham Bay Park	Local	Astor Place 4 6 <6> toward Brooklyn Bridge–City Hall
Non-revenue services and lines
Preceding station	New York City Subway	Following station
18th Street local; closed	no service	
Track layout
Station service legend
Symbol	Description
Stops all times except late nights	Stops all times except late nights
Stops all times	Stops all times
Stops late nights only	Stops late nights only
Stops rush hours in the peak direction only	Stops rush hours in the peak direction only

The 14th Street–Union Square station (also Union Square–14th Street) is an express station on the IRT Lexington Avenue Line. The 4 and 6 trains stop here at all times; the 5 train stops here at all times except late nights; and the <6> train stops here during weekdays in the peak direction. The 5 train always makes express stops, the 6 and <6> trains always make local stops; and the 4 train makes express stops during the day and local stops at night. The next station northbound is 23rd Street–Baruch College for local trains and Grand Central–42nd Street for express trains, while the next station southbound is Astor Place for local trains and Brooklyn Bridge–City Hall for express trains. When the subway opened, the next local stop to the north was 18th Street; that station closed in 1948.

The station has four tracks and two island platforms. The uptown and downtown platforms are offset from each other, having been extended at their rear ends, and are curved. The island platforms allow for cross-platform interchanges between local and express trains heading in the same direction. Local trains use the outer tracks while express trains use the inner tracks. The island platforms were originally 350 feet (110 m) long, like the other express stations on the original IRT, but later were extended to 525 feet (160 m). The platforms are 30 feet (9.1 m) wide at their widest point. Departing passengers are asked to watch the gap upon leaving the train at this station. Platform gap fillers on the downtown side use proximity sensors to detect when trains arrive, automatically extending when a train has stopped in the station. Unlike the rest of the complex, no elevators lead down to the Lexington Avenue Line platforms. This is because the portions of the platforms under the mezzanine are too narrow for elevators. A 2020 study by Stantec found that, unless the downtown platform were rebuilt, it could never become fully accessible because of its "extreme curvature". According to a separate report by engineering firm STV, it would be prohibitively expensive to relocate the southbound platform northward to eliminate the gap fillers.

The station has two abandoned local side platforms; the northbound platform is visible through windows, bordered with wide, bright red frames. A combination of island and side platforms was also used at Brooklyn Bridge–City Hall on the IRT Lexington Avenue Line and 96th Street on the IRT Broadway–Seventh Avenue Line.

=== Design ===
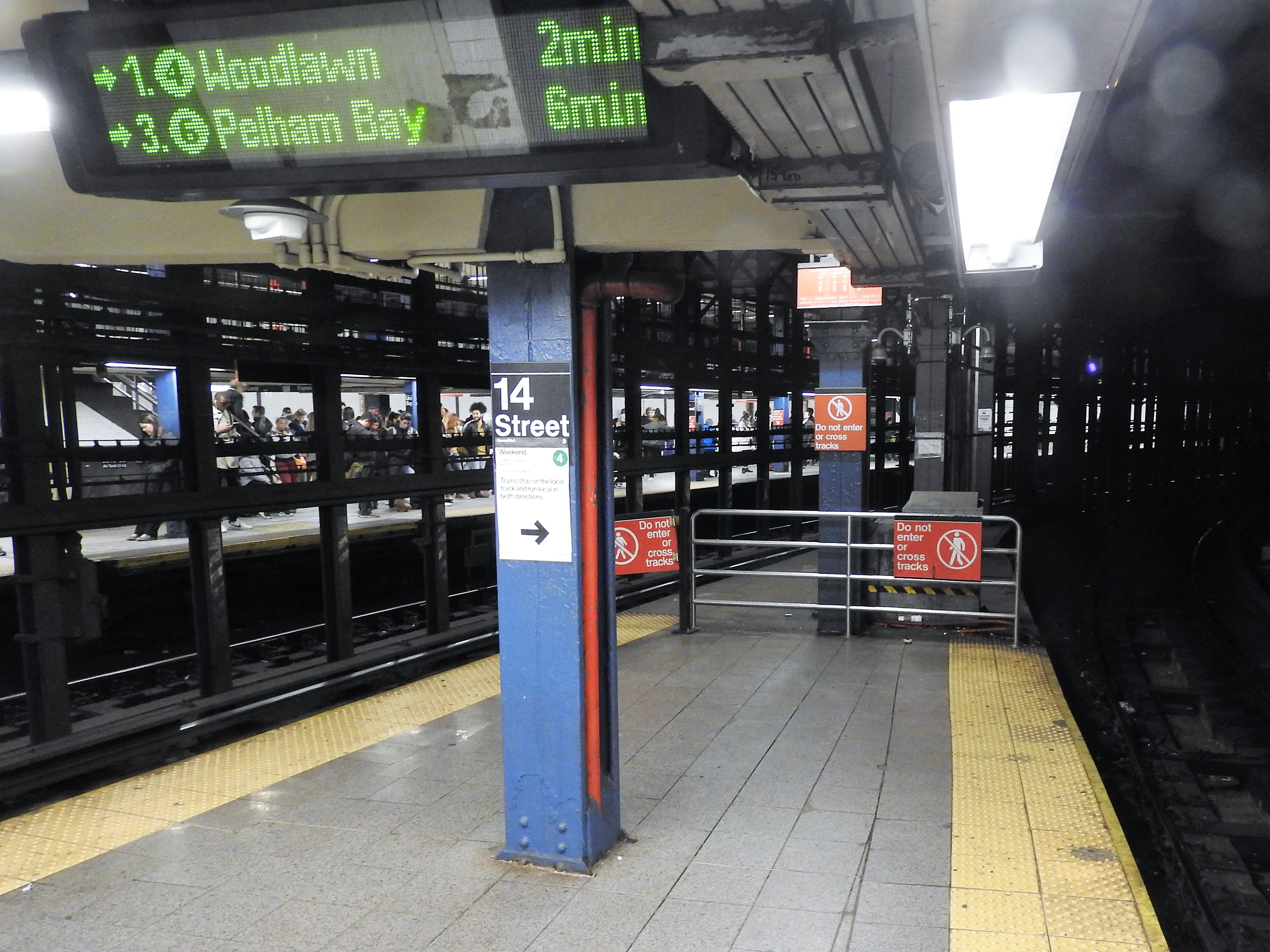
The platforms are offset, with the original platforms having been extended at their rears

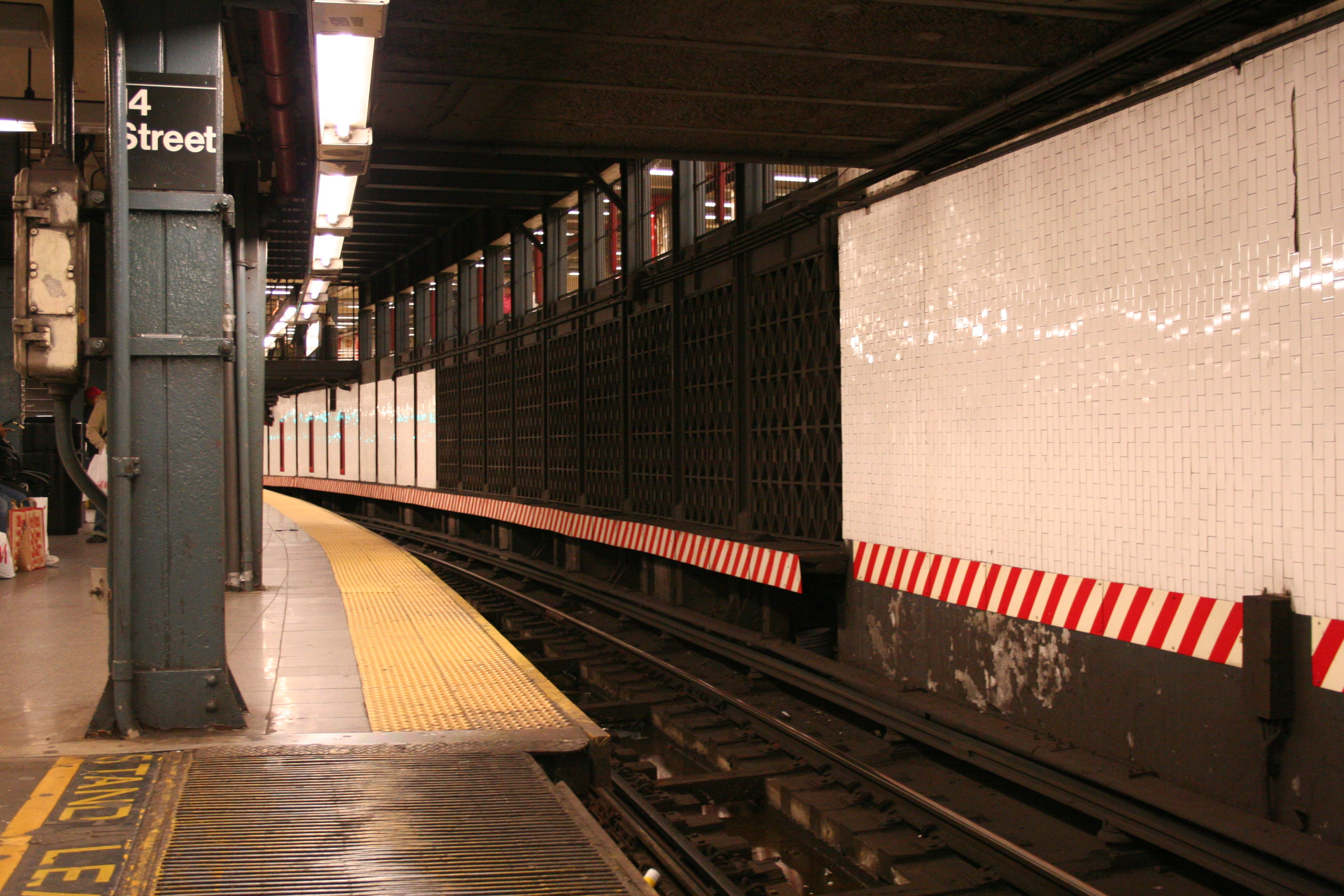
Abandoned side platform behind the wall and the black bars on the right, whose edge is still visible

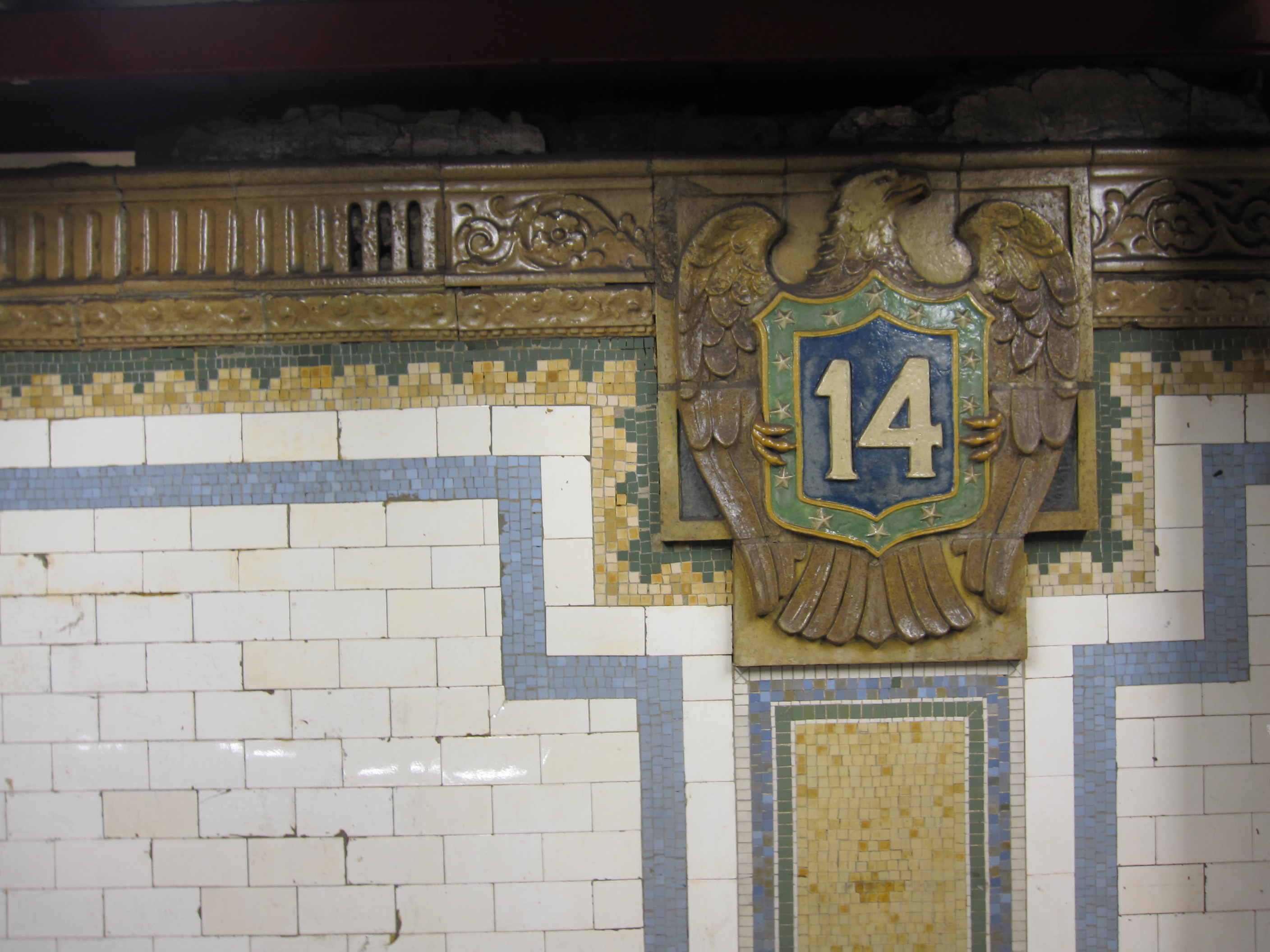
Old IRT "14" eagle cartouche

As with other stations built as part of the original IRT, the station was constructed using a cut-and-cover method. The tunnel is covered by a U-shaped trough that contains utility pipes and wires. The bottom of this trough has a foundation of concrete no less than 4 inches (100 mm) thick. Each platform consists of 3-inch-thick (7.6 cm) concrete slabs, beneath which are drainage basins. The platforms have I-beam columns spaced every 15 feet (4.6 m). Additional columns between the tracks, spaced every 5 feet (1.5 m), support the jack-arched concrete station roofs. There is a 1-inch (25 mm) gap between the trough wall and the platform walls, which are made of 4-inch (100 mm)-thick brick covered over by a tiled finish.

The walls near the tracks do not have any identifying motifs with the station's name, as all station identification signs are on the platforms. The trackside walls are clad with vertical white glass tiles. The original decorative scheme for the side platforms consisted of blue tile station-name tablets, blue and buff tile bands, a yellow faience cornice, and blue faience plaques. The mosaic tiles at all original IRT stations were manufactured by the American Encaustic Tile Company, which subcontracted the installations at each station. The decorative work was performed by faience contractor Grueby Faience Company. Above the IRT platforms are 32 ceiling fans, which were installed in 2000. Despite the fans' presence, the station is consistently reported as one of the hottest in the New York City Subway system.

=== Track layout ===
Similar to at 72nd Street on the IRT Broadway–Seventh Avenue Line, there were originally additional tracks at the approach to either platform between each pair of local and express tracks. These tracks were approximately 300 feet (91 m) long and were used as "stacking" tracks, where trains could be held momentarily until the platform was clear and the train could enter the station. The tracks here and at 72nd Street were rendered useless when train lengths grew beyond these tracks' capacity. The track between the southbound tracks, north of the southbound platform, was removed as a result of the 1991 derailment. A similar track still exists between the northbound tracks south of the northbound platform.

== BMT Broadway Line platforms ==
14 Street–Union Square
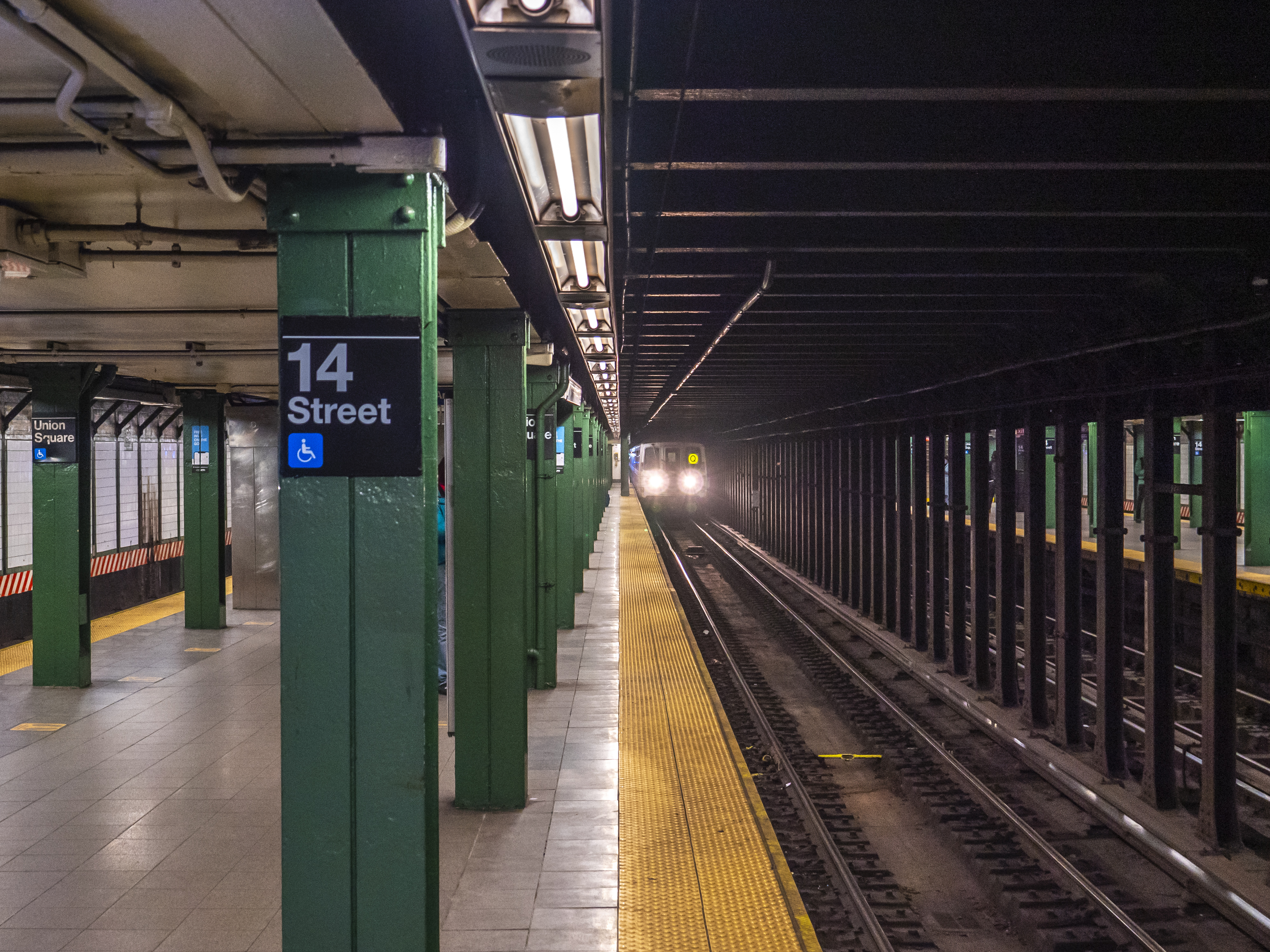
- R46 Q train arriving on the southbound express track

Station statistics
- Division: B (BMT)
- Line: BMT Broadway Line
- Services: N (all times); Q (all times); R (all except late nights); W (weekdays only)
- Platforms: 2 island platforms cross-platform interchange
- Tracks: 4

Other information
- Opened: September 4, 1917 (109 years ago)
- Accessible: Yes (Transfer to IRT Lexington Avenue Line platforms not accessible)
Services
Preceding station	New York City Subway	Following station
34th Street–Herald Square N Q via Times Square–42nd Street	Express	Canal Street N Q services split
23rd Street N Q R W via Lexington Avenue–59th Street	Local	Eighth Street–New York University N Q R W via Whitehall Street–South Ferry
Track layout
Station service legend
Symbol	Description
Stops all times except late nights	Stops all times except late nights
Stops all times	Stops all times
Stops late nights only	Stops late nights only
Stops late nights and weekends	Stops late nights and weekends
Stops weekdays during the day	Stops weekdays during the day

The 14th Street–Union Square station is an express station on the BMT Broadway Line that has four tracks and two island platforms. The N and Q stop here at all times, the R stops here except at night, and the W stops here only on weekdays during the day. The R and W always run on the local tracks. The N runs on the express tracks only on weekdays during the day and on the local tracks at all other times. The Q runs on the express tracks during the day and on the local tracks during the night. The next station northbound is 23rd Street for local trains and 34th Street–Herald Square for express trains, while the next station southbound is Eighth Street–New York University for local trains and Canal Street for express trains. The island platforms were originally 530 feet (160 m) long but were extended to 615 feet (187 m) in the early 1970s. Both platforms are 18 feet 8 inches (5.69 m) wide. The platforms are 30 feet (9.1 m) below the street. At the southern end of each platform, three stairs and an elevator lead to the mezzanine, and one stair leads to the Canarsie Line platforms. At the northern end of each platform, two stairs lead to the mezzanine.

The tunnel is covered by a U-shaped trough that contains utility pipes and wires. The bottom of this trough has a concrete foundation no less than 4 inches (100 mm) thick. Each platform consists of 3-inch-thick (7.6 cm) concrete slabs, beneath which are drainage basins. The platforms have I-beam columns spaced every 15 feet (4.6 m); these columns are placed 3 feet 6 inches (1.07 m) from the platform edge. Additional columns between the tracks, spaced every 5 feet (1.5 m), support the jack-arched concrete station roofs. The trackside walls also contain exposed I-beam columns, dividing the trackside walls into 5-foot-wide panels.

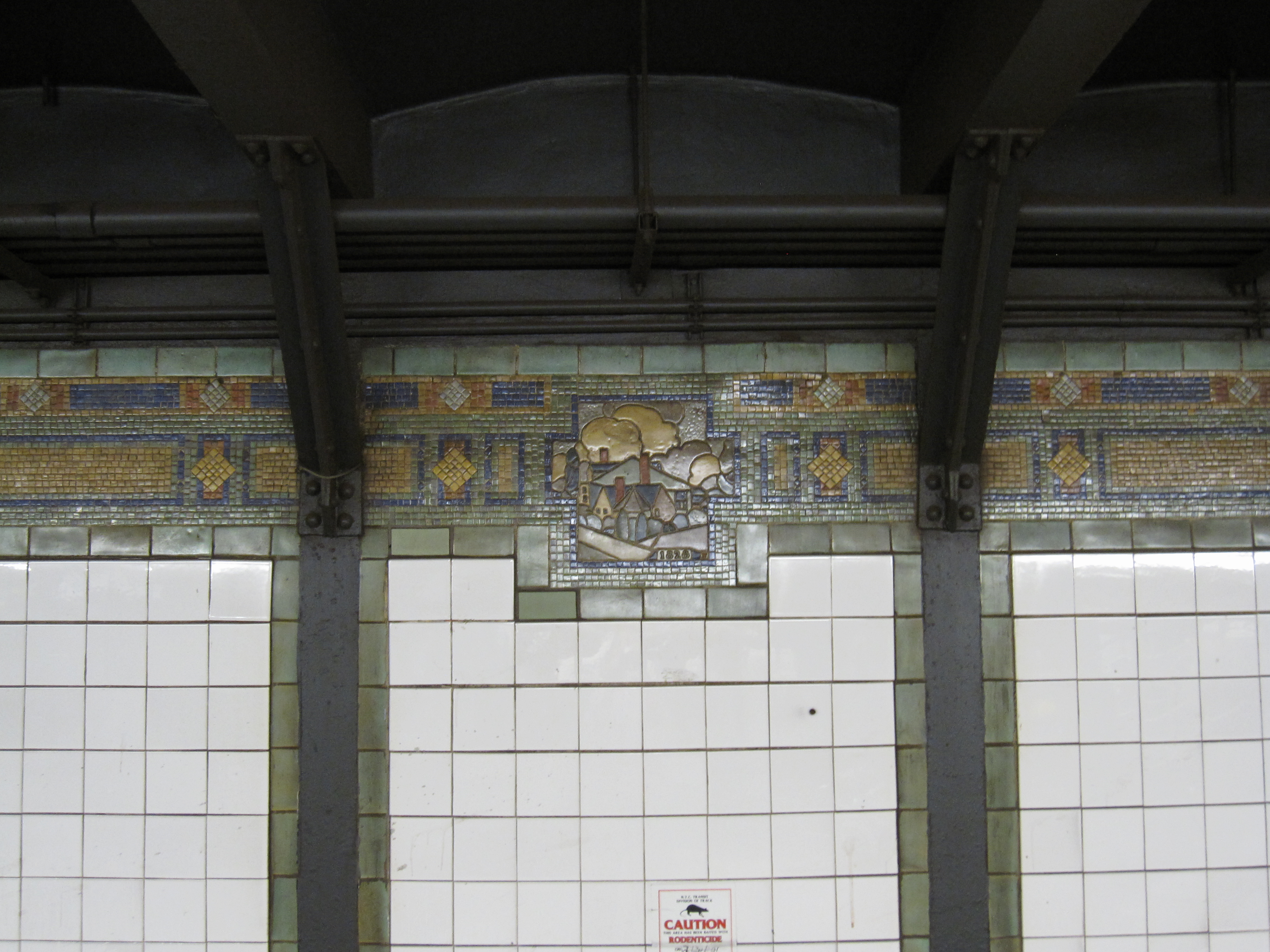
Mosaic depicting the junction of Broadway and Bowery Road in 1828

The panels on the trackside walls consist of white square ceramic tiles. A frieze with multicolored geometric patterns runs atop the trackside walls, with a square mosaic tile placed inside the frieze at intervals of three panels. A band of narrow green tiles runs along the left and right edges of each white-tiled panel, as well as below the frieze and mosaic tiles. The mosaic tiles, by Jay Van Everen, are part of a work entitled The junction of Broadway and Bowery Road, 1828, a reference to the two streets that intersect at Union Square.

== BMT Canarsie Line platform ==
Union Square
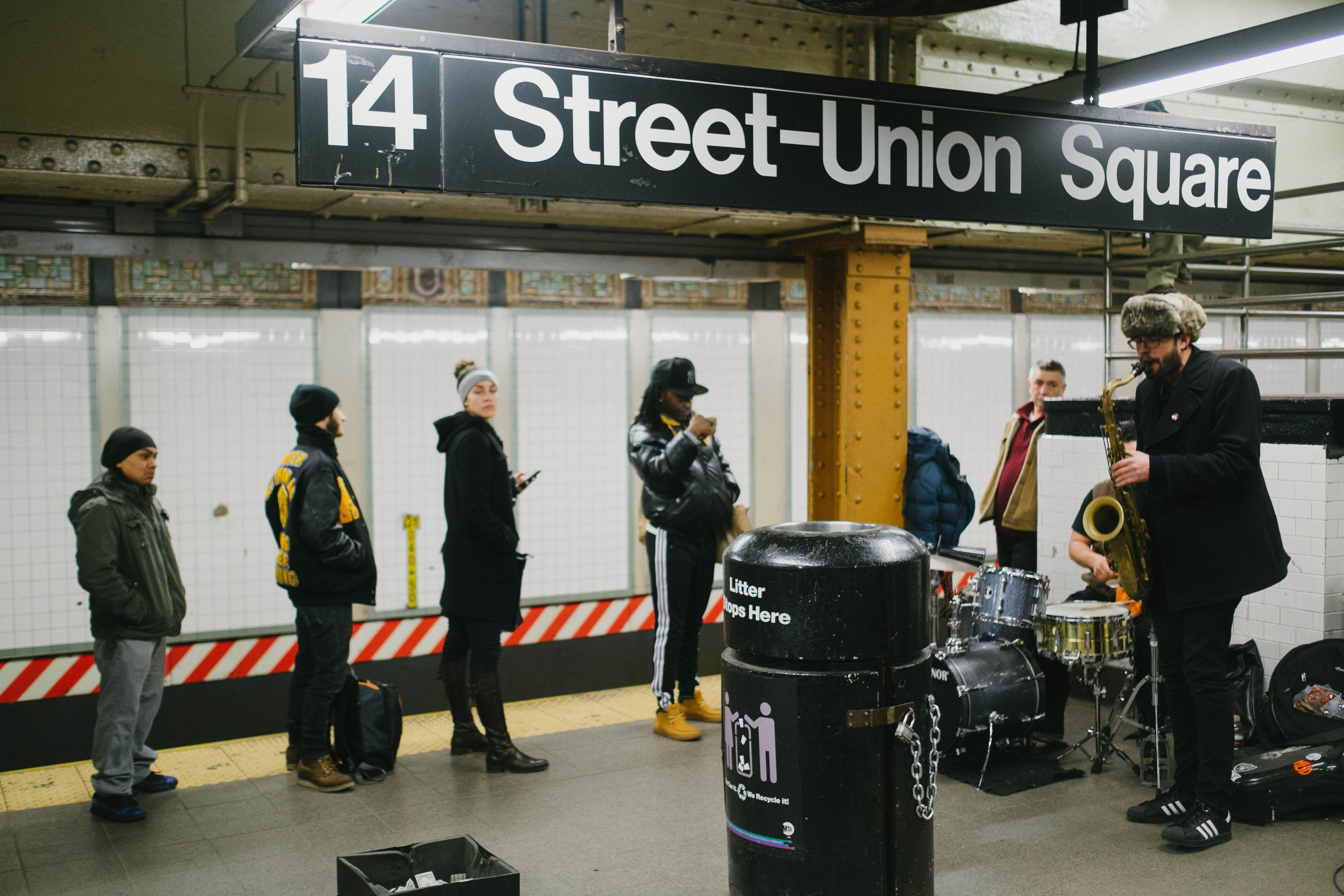
- Platform view

Station statistics
- Division: B (BMT)
- Line: BMT Canarsie Line
- Services: L (all times)
- Platforms: 1 island platform
- Tracks: 2

Other information
- Opened: June 30, 1924 (102 years ago)
- Accessible: Yes (transfer to IRT Lexington Avenue Line platforms not accessible)
- Former/other names: 14 Street–Union Square
Services
Preceding station	New York City Subway	Following station
Sixth Avenue toward Eighth Avenue	L (New York City Subway service)	Third Avenue toward Canarsie–Rockaway Parkway
Track layout
Station service legend
Symbol	Description
Stops all times	Stops all times

The Union Square station (announced as 14th Street–Union Square on rolling stock) on the BMT Canarsie Line has two tracks and one island platform. The station is served by the L train at all times and is between Sixth Avenue to the west and Third Avenue to the east. Various stairs and an elevator go up from the platform to the mezzanine. A stair also leads directly to either of the Broadway Line platforms. An escalator leads directly from the Canarsie Line platform to the IRT mezzanine.

The tunnel is covered by a U-shaped trough that contains utility pipes and wires. The bottom of this trough has a concrete foundation no less than 4 inches (100 mm) thick. The platform consists of 3-inch-thick (7.6 cm) concrete slabs, beneath which are drainage basins. The platform contains I-beam columns spaced every 15 feet (4.6 m); these columns are placed between 28 and 42 inches (710 and 1,070 mm) from the platform edge. The trackside walls also contain exposed I-beam columns, dividing the trackside walls into 5-foot-wide panels.

The panels on the trackside walls consist of white square ceramic tiles. A band of narrow green tiles runs along the left, right, and top edges of each white-tiled panel. A frieze with multicolored geometric patterns runs atop the trackside walls, with a hexagonal mosaic tile with the letter "U" placed inside the frieze at intervals of three panels.

== Ridership ==
The 14th Street–Union Square station has historically ranked among the New York City Subway's busiest stations. Although the station had only 14 million passengers in 1913, this had increased to 40 million passengers per year in 1925 shortly after the opening of the Canarsie Line platform. By the early 1930s, the complex recorded 52 million annual passengers. The number of passengers entering the 14th Street–Union Square station annually declined over the years, from 22.702 million in 1963 to 17.168 million in 1973.

By 2011, the Union Square station was the fourth-busiest in the system, behind the Times Square, Grand Central, and Herald Square stations; at the time, an average of 107,352 riders entered the station every weekday. In 2019, the station had 32,385,260 boardings, making it the fourth-most-used station in the 423-station system. This amounted to an average of 101,832 passengers per weekday. Due to the COVID-19 pandemic in New York City, ridership dropped drastically in 2020, with only 10,830,712 passengers entering the station that year. However, it remained the system's fourth most-used station.

== See also ==
- National Register of Historic Places listings in Manhattan from 14th to 59th Streets
