= Brooklyn Bridge–City Hall/Chambers Street station =

New York City Subway station in Manhattan

Brooklyn Bridge–City Hall/ Chambers Street
- New York City Subway station complex
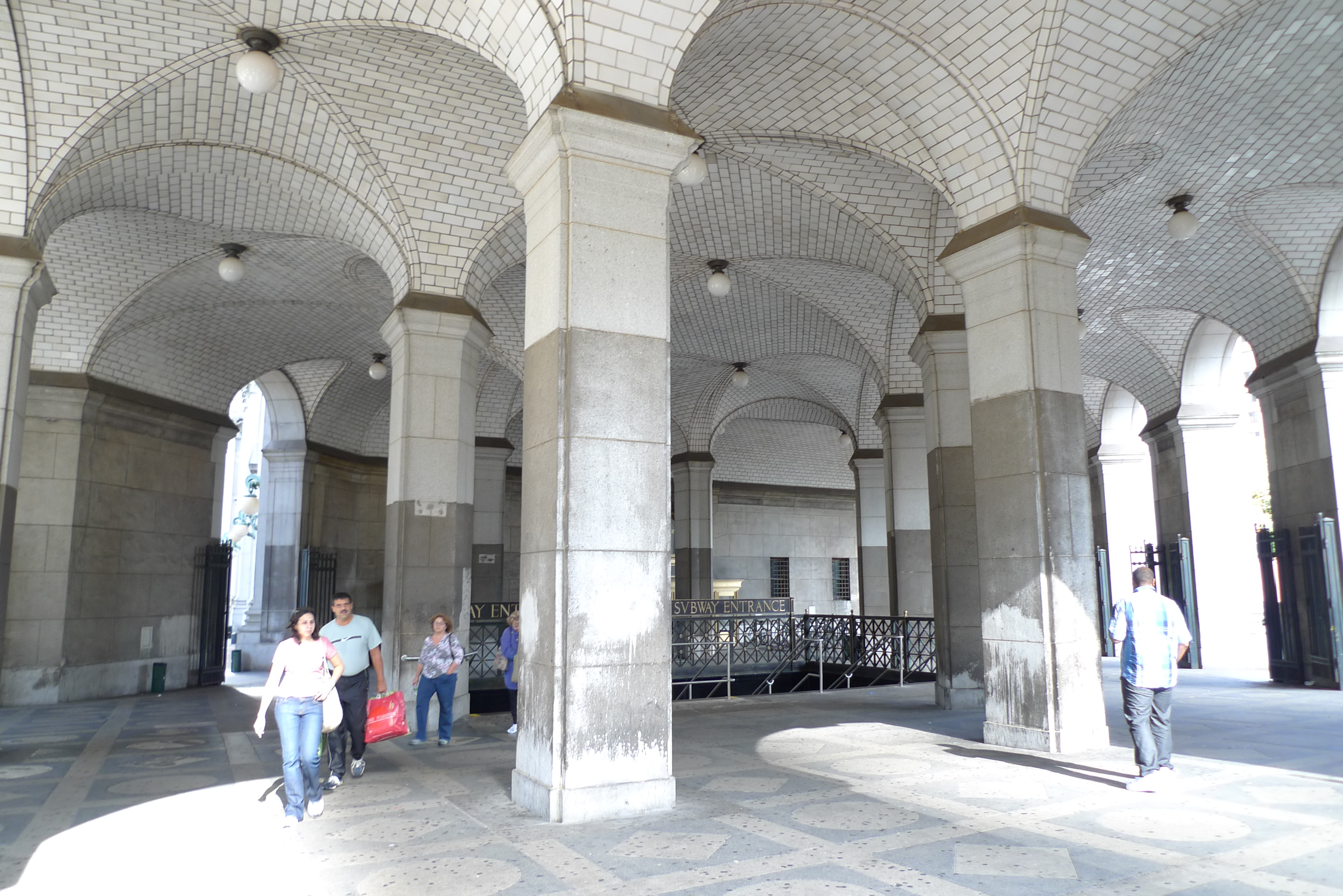
- Municipal Building entrance

Station statistics
- Address: Centre Street between Park Row and Foley Square; New York, New York
- Borough: Manhattan
- Locale: Civic Center
- Coordinates: 40°42′46″N 74°00′17″W
- Division: A (IRT), B (BMT)
- Line: IRT Lexington Avenue Line; BMT Nassau Street Line
- Services: 4 (all times); 5 (all times except late nights); 6 (all times) <6> (weekdays until 8:45 p.m., peak direction); J (all times); Z (rush hours, peak direction)
- Transit: NYCT Bus: M9, M22, M103; MTA Bus: BM1, BM2, BM3, BM4, QM7, QM8, QM11, QM25, QM65
- Structure: Underground

Other information
- Opened: IRT station: October 27, 1904; 122 years ago; BMT station: August 4, 1913; 113 years ago; Transfer: July 1, 1948; 78 years ago
- Accessible: Yes

Traffic
- 2025: 6,174,587 ▲4.5%
- Rank: 44 out of 423
Location
Location within New York City Subway
Location within New York City
Location within New York
Street map
Station service legend
Symbol	Description
Stops all times	Stops all times
Stops all times except late nights	Stops all times except late nights
Stops late nights only	Stops late nights only
Stops rush hours in the peak direction only	Stops rush hours in the peak direction only

The Brooklyn Bridge–City Hall/Chambers Street station is a New York City Subway station complex in Lower Manhattan. The complex is served by trains of the IRT Lexington Avenue Line and the BMT Nassau Street Line. The station is served by the 4, 6, and J trains at all times; the 5 train at all times except late nights; the <6> train during weekdays in the peak direction; and the Z train during rush hours in the peak direction. It is the southern terminal for all 6 trains.

The complex comprises two stations, Brooklyn Bridge–City Hall and Chambers Street. The Brooklyn Bridge–City Hall station was built for the Interborough Rapid Transit Company (IRT), and was an express station on the city's first subway line. The station opened on October 27, 1904, as one of the original 28 stations of the New York City Subway. The Chambers Street station was built for the Brooklyn Rapid Transit Company (later the Brooklyn–Manhattan Transit Corporation, or BMT) as part of the Dual Contracts. The Nassau Street Line station opened on August 4, 1913. Over the years, several modifications have been made to both stations, which were connected within a single fare control area in 1948.

The Lexington Avenue Line's Brooklyn Bridge–City Hall station, under Centre Street, has two island platforms, two side platforms, and four tracks; the side platforms are not in use. The Nassau Street Line's Chambers Street station, under the Manhattan Municipal Building, has three island platforms, one side platform, and four tracks; only the outer tracks and two of the island platforms are in use. The complex contains elevators that make it compliant with the Americans with Disabilities Act of 1990.

== History ==
The two adjacent stations on the IRT Lexington Avenue Line and BMT Nassau Street Line are connected by two passageways. The south one opened in 1914 and was placed inside fare control on July 1, 1948. A second passageway, at the north end of the stations, was opened in the evening of September 1, 1962, when the Lexington Avenue Line platforms were extended and the Worth Street station was closed. Originally, the stations were operated by separate companies: the Interborough Rapid Transit Company (IRT) and the Brooklyn–Manhattan Transit Corporation (BMT). The city government took over the BMT's operations on June 1, 1940, and the IRT's operations on June 12, 1940. Both sections of the station complex were listed on the National Register of Historic Places (NRHP) in 2005.

=== IRT Lexington Avenue Line ===
==== Construction and opening ====
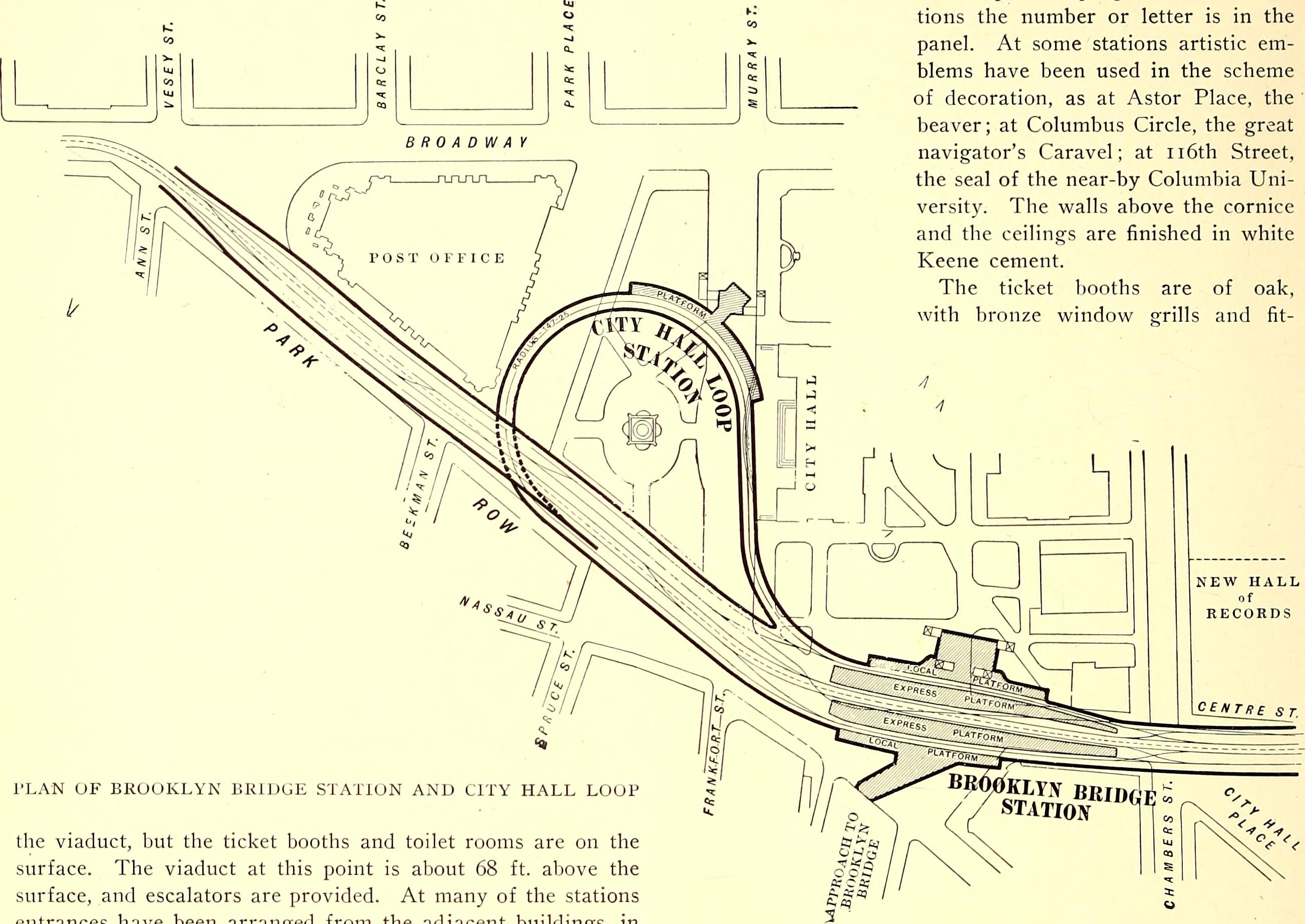
Original plan of the Brooklyn Bridge station (lower-right corner) as well as the City Hall Loop

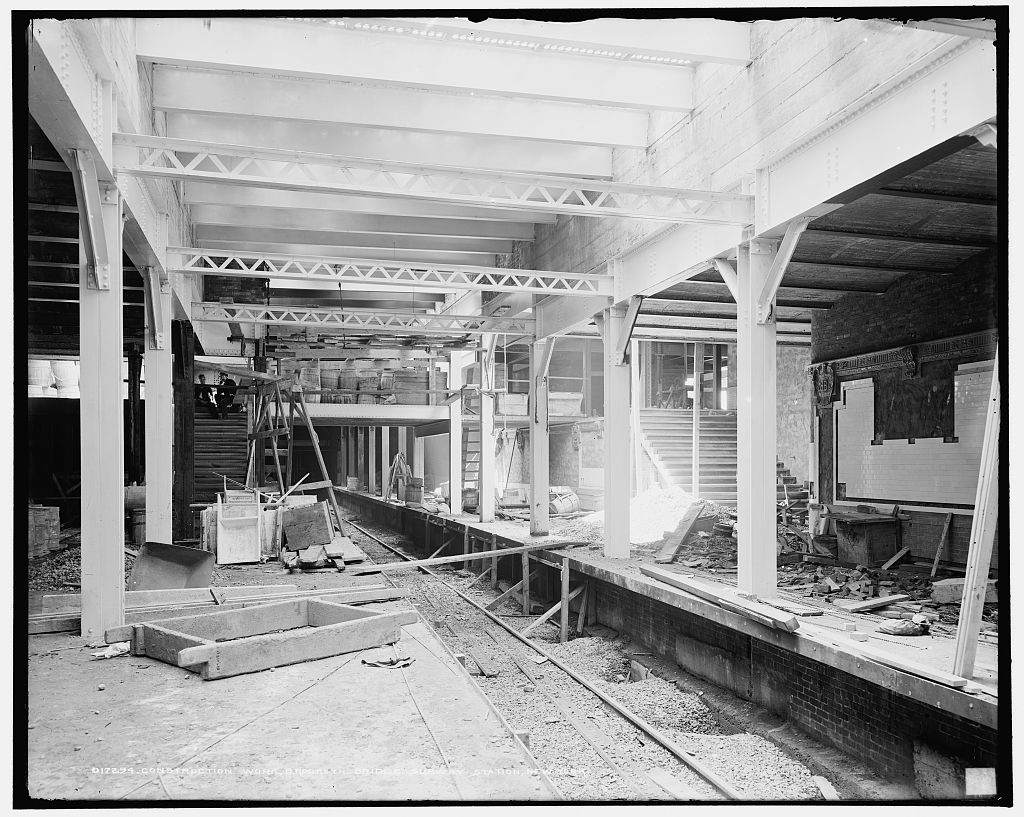
The station under construction in 1904

Planning for a subway line in New York City dates to 1864. However, development of what would become the city's first subway line did not start until 1894, when the New York State Legislature passed the Rapid Transit Act. The subway plans were drawn up by a team of engineers led by William Barclay Parsons, the Rapid Transit Commission's chief engineer. It called for a subway line from New York City Hall in Lower Manhattan to the Upper West Side, where two branches would lead north into the Bronx. A plan was formally adopted in 1897, and all legal conflicts over the route alignment were resolved near the end of 1899. The Rapid Transit Construction Company, organized by John B. McDonald and funded by August Belmont Jr., signed the initial Contract 1 with the Rapid Transit Commission in February 1900, in which it would construct the subway and maintain a 50-year operating lease from the opening of the line. In 1901, the firm of Heins & LaFarge was hired to design the underground stations. Belmont incorporated the Interborough Rapid Transit Company (IRT) in April 1902 to operate the subway.

The Brooklyn Bridge station was constructed as part of the IRT's original line south of Great Jones Street. The Degnon-McLean Contracting Company was awarded the contract for Section 1, from the City Hall loop to Chambers Street, and the contract for Section 2, from Chambers Street to Great Jones Street. Work began on Section 1 on March 24, 1900, and work began on Section 2 on July 10, 1900. Initially, Parsons was unsure whether to connect the new subway to the existing Brooklyn Bridge, the under-construction Manhattan Bridge, or the newly-completed Williamsburg Bridge. As such, no plans had been drawn up for the eastern portion of the Brooklyn Bridge station or its approaches by early 1903, which caused delays in ordering steel.

By late 1903, the subway was nearly complete, but the IRT Powerhouse and the system's electrical substations were still under construction, delaying the system's opening. In addition, the Brooklyn Bridge station itself remained unfinished as late as February 1904. The Brooklyn Bridge station opened on October 27, 1904, as one of the original 28 stations of the New York City Subway from City Hall to 145th Street on the West Side Branch. The station's first-ever passenger was described by Newsday as an "anonymous middle-aged Brooklyn woman who picked up her skirt and raced down the rubber-covered stairs three at a time to beat out the rest of the crowd". Express trains were extended south on January 16, 1905, when a 0.3-mile (0.48 km)-long extension to Fulton Street opened.

==== 1900s to 1920s ====
The station was originally placed on a sharp curve, requiring the installation of platform gap fillers. Initially, the Brooklyn Bridge station was served by local and express trains along both the West Side (now the Broadway–Seventh Avenue Line to Van Cortlandt Park–242nd Street) and East Side (now the Lenox Avenue Line). West Side local trains had their southern terminus at City Hall during rush hours and South Ferry at other times, and had their northern terminus at 242nd Street. East Side local trains ran from City Hall to Lenox Avenue (145th Street). Express trains had their southern terminus at South Ferry or Atlantic Avenue and had their northern terminus at 242nd Street, Lenox Avenue (145th Street), or West Farms (180th Street). Express trains to 145th Street were later eliminated, and West Farms express trains and rush-hour Broadway express trains operated through to Brooklyn.

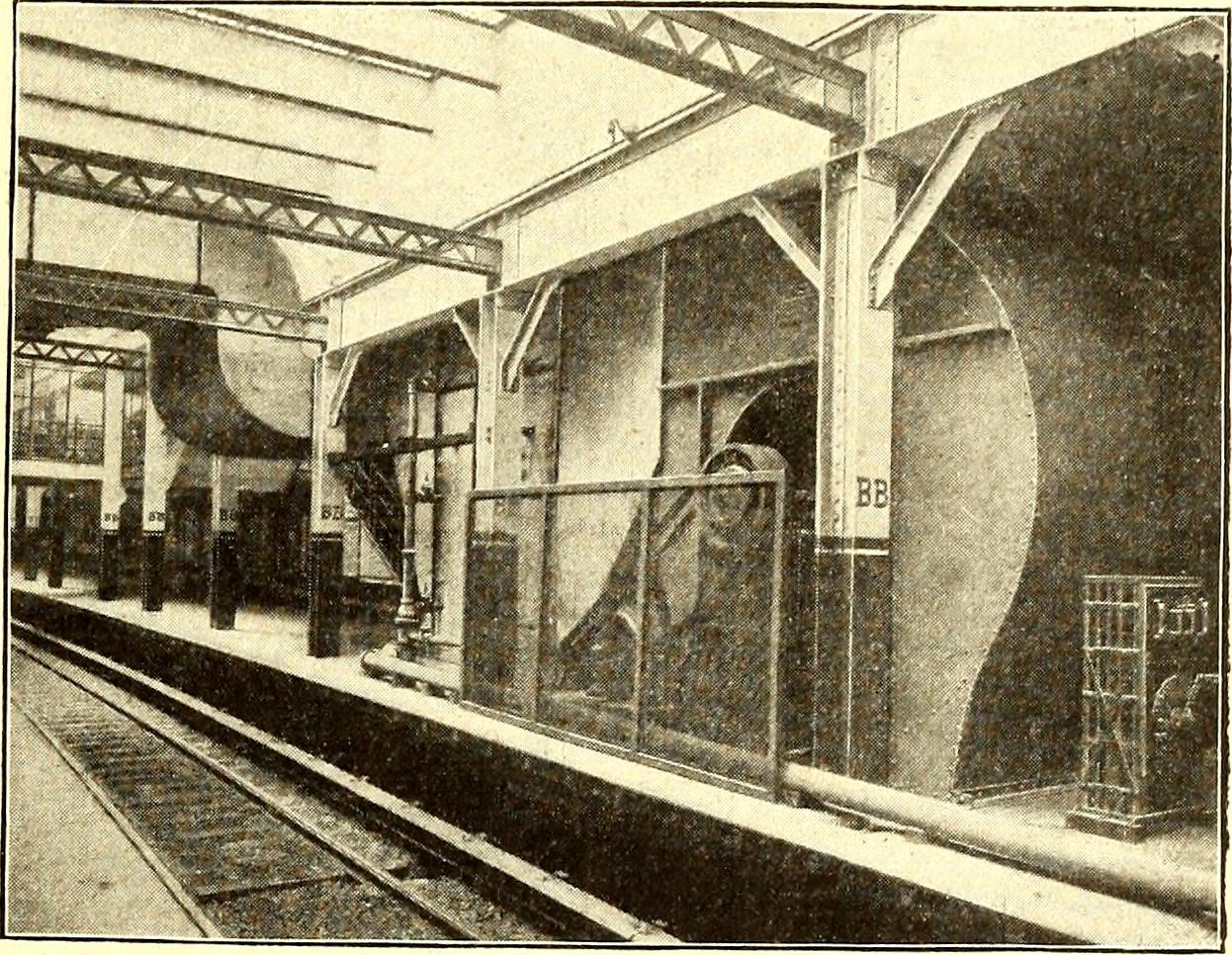
Experimental cooling system at the Brooklyn Bridge station

One of the station's entrances was closed in 1905 because the Rapid Transit Commission had not authorized the entrance's construction. As part of an experiment to improve the subway line's ventilation, the commission installed ventilation fans at the station in June 1905. Two large cooling fans were installed at the station the next month; this was later increased to four fans. The Rapid Transit Commission added a refrigeration plant to the station in August 1906. The plant consisted of four pumps at the northern end of the station, which could draw up to 300 or 400 U.S. gallons per minute (19 or 25 L/s) of groundwater; the water was then chilled and sent through ducts above the platforms.

To address overcrowding, in 1909, the New York Public Service Commission proposed lengthening the platforms at stations along the original IRT subway. As part of a modification to the IRT's construction contracts made on January 18, 1910, the company was to lengthen station platforms to accommodate ten-car express and six-car local trains. In addition to $1.5 million (equivalent to $51.8 million in 2025) spent on platform lengthening, $500,000 (equivalent to $17.3 million in 2025) was spent on building additional entrances and exits. It was anticipated that these improvements would increase capacity by 25 percent. At the Brooklyn Bridge station, the northbound island platform was extended 15 feet (4.6 m) north and 135 feet (41 m) south, while the southbound island platform was extended 165 feet (50 m) south, necessitating the relocation of some tracks. Six-car local trains began operating in October 1910. On January 23, 1911, ten-car express trains began running on the Lenox Avenue Line, and the next day, ten-car express trains were inaugurated on the West Side Line.

By 1914, city engineers had prepared plans for the construction of five additional entrances to the Brooklyn Bridge station: three to the street and two to nearby buildings. At that point, nearly two-fifths of commuters entered the station through a single entrance below the bridge. In 1918, the Lexington Avenue Line opened north of Grand Central–42nd Street, and the original line was divided into an H-shaped system. All trains were sent via the Lexington Avenue Line. In 1922, the Rapid Transit Commission awarded a contract to the Wagner Engineering Company for the installation of navigational signs at the Brooklyn Bridge station and several other major subway stations. The IRT platforms received blue-and-white signs.

==== 1930s to 1960s ====
The Transit Commission requested in 1938 that the IRT spend $70,000 (equivalent to $1,601,000 in 2025) to add platform gap fillers to the northbound platform; the absence of gap fillers had resulted in passenger injuries 26 times in the preceding two years. The same year, as part of a remodeling of City Hall Park, city parks commissioner Robert Moses proposed removing two of the station's exit stairways and relocating two entrance stairs. With the closure of the City Hall station at the end of 1945, the Brooklyn Bridge station became the southernmost station for local services that formerly terminated at City Hall. As part of a reconstruction of the Brooklyn Bridge in 1951, the city planned to build a subway entrance just south of the bridge approach. The New York City Transit Authority (NYCTA) also announced plans in 1956 to add fluorescent lights above the edges of the station's platforms.

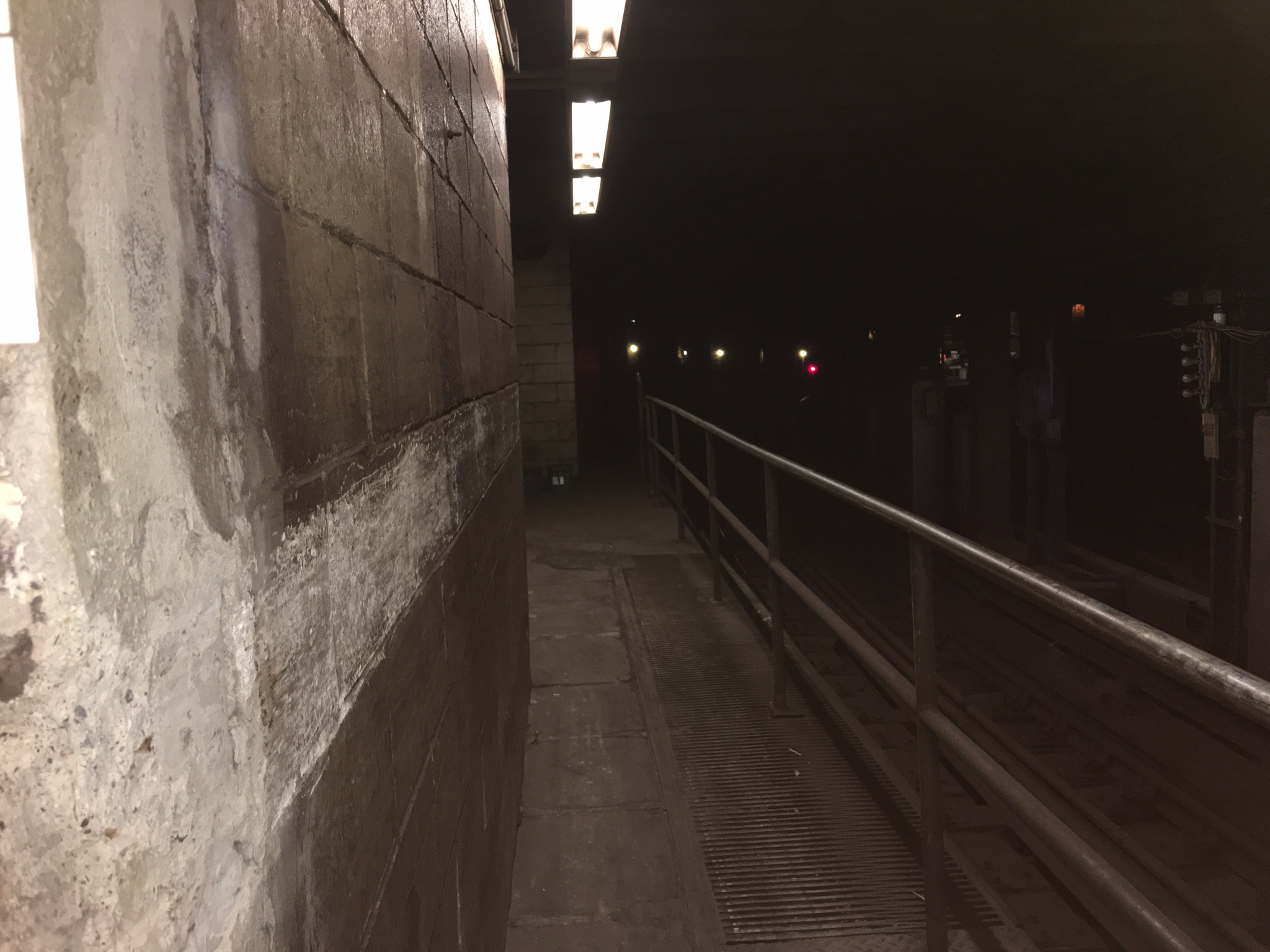
Disused gap fillers on the original southern extension of the northbound platform

In the late 1950s and early 1960s, the NYCTA undertook a $138 million (equivalent to $1.52 billion in 2025) modernization project for the Lexington Avenue Line. As part of the modernization program, the NYCTA announced in early 1957 that the Brooklyn Bridge station would be extended about 250 feet (76 m) to the north and that the platforms would be widened and straightened to remove the need for gap fillers. At the time, the island platforms narrowed at their northern ends to 5 feet (1.5 m), while the local side platforms could only accommodate four cars, resulting in delays. In addition, the express platforms could not accommodate 10-car trains because of the gap fillers at the southern end of the station. Since the northern end of the expanded station would be only about 600 feet (180 m) from the Worth Street station, the latter station was to be closed. The NYCTA allocated $6 million to the station's renovation in January 1959. Harold Sandifer of the NYCTA designed the renovation in conjunction with the planned redevelopment of the Civic Center neighborhood.

Work started on May 18, 1959. The project lengthened the platforms from 295 feet (90 m) to 523 feet (159 m) and widened them. The platforms were extended northward by 220 feet (67 m) to just south of Reade Street. In addition, a new exit was provided at Reade Street and Lafayette Street, and a new passageway under Reade Street was built connecting to the Chambers Street station on the BMT Nassau Street Line. At the center of the enlarged platforms, a new overpass was built, providing more direct access to the Municipal Building. The tile walls on the unused eastern side platform were completed in December 1959, and a signal tower, maintainers' rooms, relay rooms, and tile walls on the unused western side platform were completed in May 1960.

A temporary transfer passageway to the Chambers Street station opened in June 1961, while the old passageway was being demolished. The downtown platform's extension opened in 1961, and the uptown platform's extension opened on August 31, 1962. The overpass and the permanent passageway to the Chambers Street station opened in June 1963, and the platform extension project was substantially completed by the end of 1963. The old platform extensions at the southern end of the station, which were used for express service and had gap fillers, were abandoned. The project cost $6 million; it allowed trains on the 6 route to be lengthened to nine cars, and allowed ten-car express trains to open all doors at the station (previously, only the doors of eight cars had opened). Upon the completion of the renovation, the Brooklyn Bridge station was renamed Brooklyn Bridge–Worth Street.

==== 1970s to present ====
The American Society of Mechanical Engineers and American Society of Civil Engineers dedicated a plaque at the Brooklyn Bridge station in 1978, recognizing the original IRT line as "the first fully electrically signaled railroad in the United States and the first practical subway in New York City". This plaque was removed before 2005. The Metropolitan Transportation Authority (MTA) announced in late 1978 that it would modernize the Brooklyn Bridge station. The improvements included new finishes on the walls and floors; acoustical, signage, and lighting improvements; replacement of old mechanical equipment; and new handrails. In 1983, the MTA added funding for a renovation of the Brooklyn Bridge–City Hall station to its 1980–1984 capital plan. In addition, to speed up passenger flow, dozens of platform conductors were assigned to direct crowds on the Lexington Avenue Line platforms during the late 1980s.

In April 1993, the New York State Legislature agreed to give the MTA $9.6 billion for capital improvements. Some of the funds would be used to renovate nearly one hundred New York City Subway stations, including Brooklyn Bridge. Three elevators opened in 1992, making the station compliant with the Americans with Disabilities Act of 1990 (ADA). The elevators cost $3.4 million (equivalent to $7.2 million in 2025) and connected the mezzanine to the street and to each platform. The station was renamed Brooklyn Bridge–City Hall by the mid-1990s. The renovation was completed in 1996; the station was one of thirteen citywide whose renovations were completed that year at a total cost of $127 million (equivalent to $268.3 million in 2025). In an attempt to prevent fare evasion, the MTA added low metal fins to each arm of the Brooklyn Bridge–City Hall station's turnstiles in 2025. The next year, the MTA announced plans for a thermal energy cooling system at the IRT station.

=== BMT Nassau Street Line ===
==== Construction and opening ====
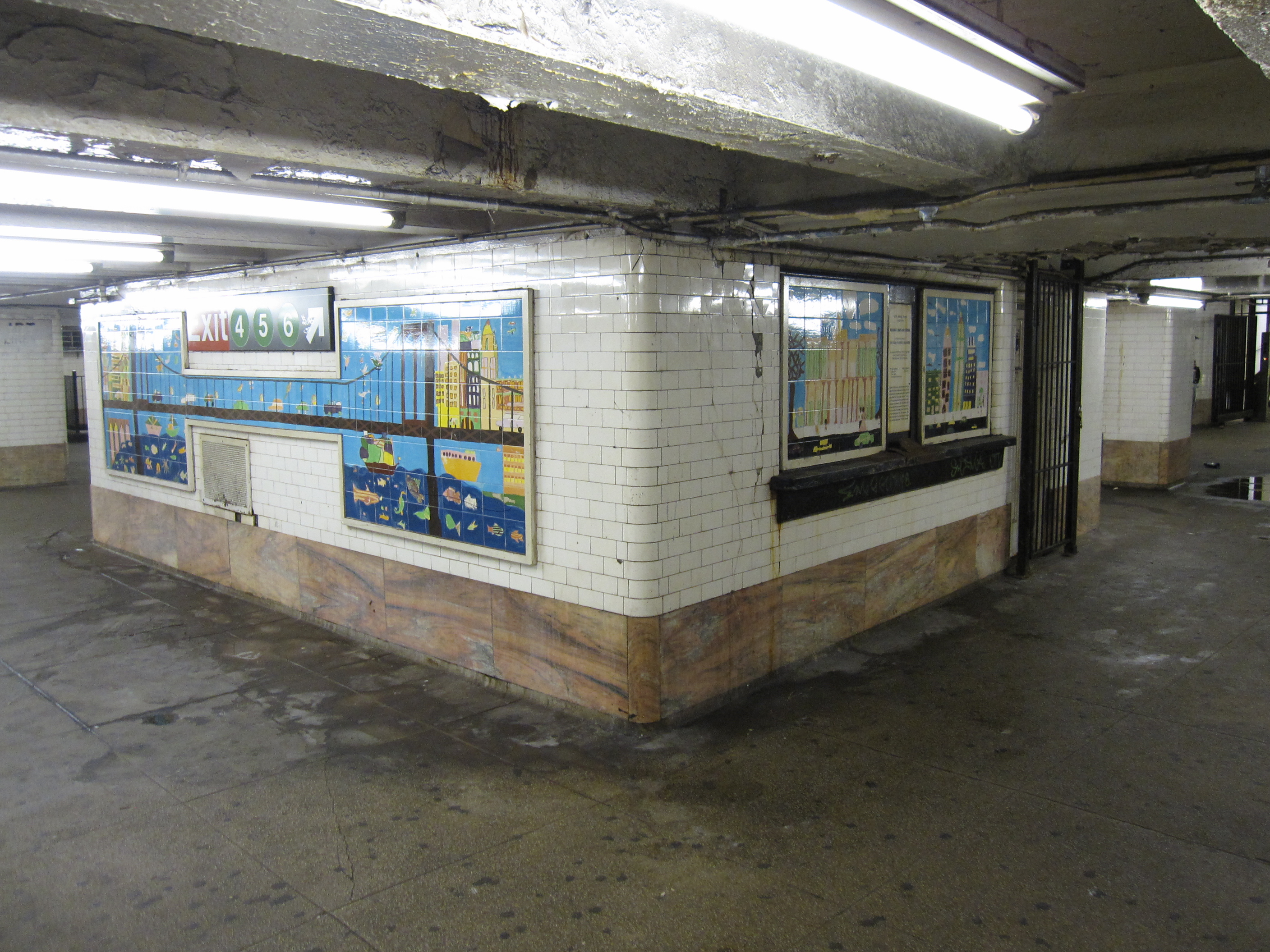
Former ticket booths at Chambers Street

After the original IRT opened, the city began planning new lines. The Centre Street Loop (later the Nassau Street Line) was approved on January 25, 1907, as a four-track line; it was to connect the Brooklyn Bridge, Manhattan Bridge, and Williamsburg Bridge via Centre Street, Canal Street, and Delancey Street. Unlike previous subway contracts that the city government had issued, the BRT was responsible only for constructing the Centre Street Loop and installing equipment, not for operating the loop. Construction contracts for the Nassau Street Line were awarded in early 1907. A proposed Tri-borough system was adopted in early 1908, incorporating the Nassau Street Line. Operation of the line was assigned to the Brooklyn Rapid Transit Company (BRT; after 1923, the Brooklyn–Manhattan Transit Corporation or BMT) in the Dual Contracts, adopted on March 4, 1913.

The Chambers Street station was built as part of contract 9-O-1, which cost $1.226 million (equivalent to $43,932,000 in 2025). It was to sit under the Manhattan Municipal Building, a large office structure being planned for the city government. One of the conditions of an architectural design competition for the Municipal Building was that its foundation could not block train tracks, stairways, or platforms. As such, the caissons in the building's foundation were positioned to avoid the station's platforms. Although McKim, Mead & White were selected for the building's construction, their original plans were rejected by the city's buildings superintendent because he felt that the underlying layer of soil and sand was not strong enough to carry the building. Uncertainty over the building's design resulted in delays in the construction of the proposed Brooklyn loop station underneath it, even as the rest of the line was nearly completed by early 1909. Furthermore, the BRT did not originally want to operate the loop.

The Public Service Commission proposed in February 1909 to expand the station to six tracks, which would allow the station to serve a proposed subway under Third Avenue, in addition to the Williamsburg Bridge and Manhattan Bridge lines. The commission estimated that the change would cost $600,000, not including land-acquisition costs of $1.055 million. The New York City Board of Estimate approved $875,000 for the station's widening that July, excluding funds for land acquisition. By April 1910, the Public Service Commission sought to downsize the station to four tracks, as it would have been not only very difficult but also extremely expensive to modify the Municipal Building's foundation to accommodate the expanded station. Ultimately, the BRT's Chambers Street station was built with five platforms and four tracks. The BRT tunnel under Centre Street was completed by 1910, except for the section under the Municipal Building, but the tunnel remained unused for several years. In March 1913, the Public Service Commission authorized the BRT to lay tracks, install signals, and operate the loop. The Bradley Construction Company was hired to install station finishes; by June 1913, the firm had completed the installation of tile and marble, and it was working on plastering.

The BRT's Chambers Street station opened on August 4, 1913, relieving traffic on elevated lines that had used the Brooklyn Bridge. Originally, trains arrived from the north via either the Williamsburg Bridge or the Manhattan Bridge, as the connection to the Montague Street Tunnel had not yet been completed. The loop configuration permitted trains arriving in either direction from the Fourth Avenue Line in Brooklyn to pass through Chambers Street and return to Fourth Avenue without having to reverse direction. Chambers Street was designed to be the BRT's Manhattan hub near City Hall, as the business and population center of the city was still near Manhattan island's southern end at the time. Initially, trains only used the western two tracks of the Centre Street tunnel, and the station was not served by Manhattan Bridge trains. The station remained incomplete for more than a year after it had opened, and workers temporarily suspended construction at the station from November 1913 to March 1914. The remaining work, which included installation of staircases and completion of ceilings, was completed on September 14, 1914.

==== 1920s to 1950s ====
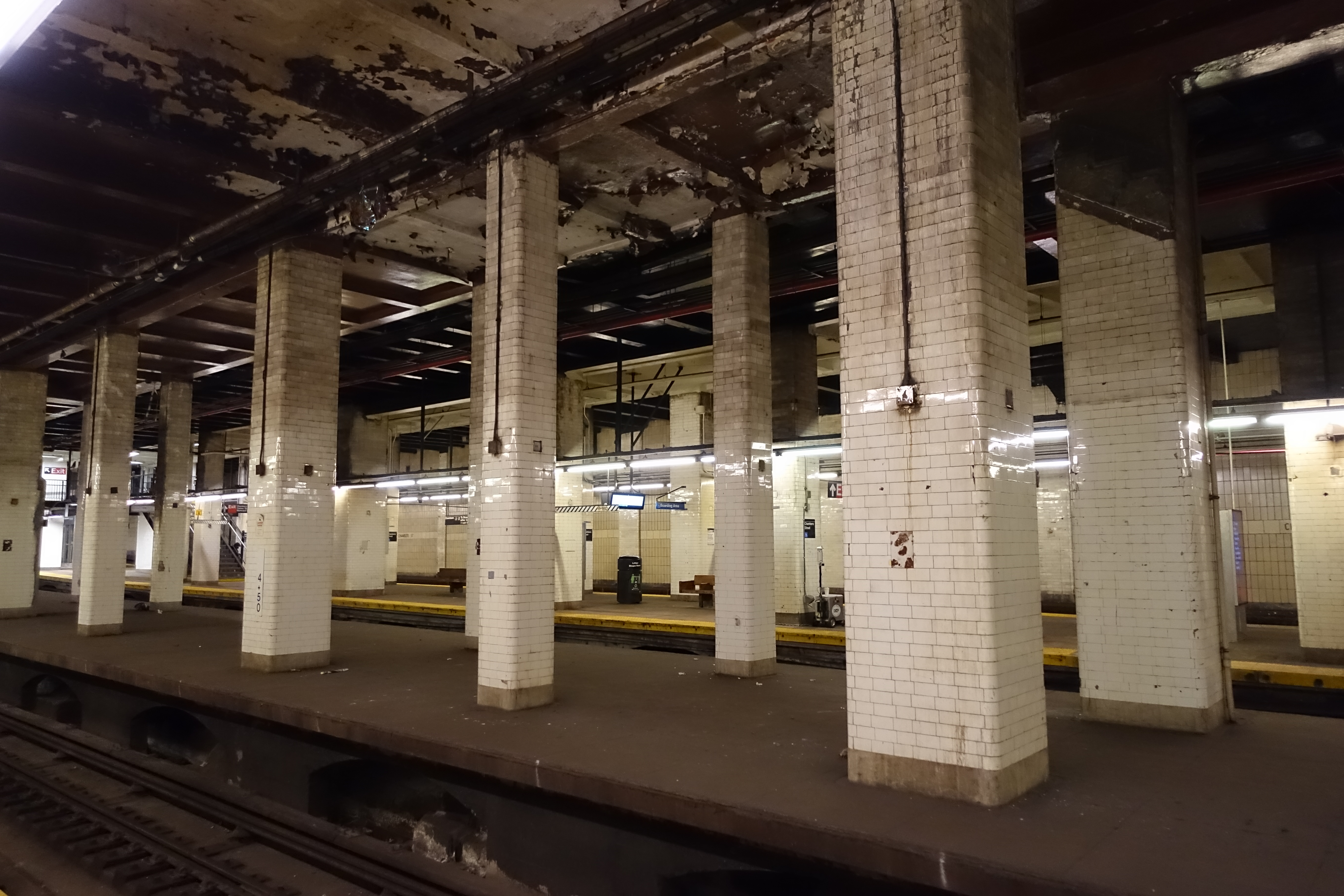
The Chambers Street station's central island platform, as well as the side platforms, were abandoned after 1931.

A track connection between the Brooklyn Bridge's elevated-railroad tracks and the Centre Street tunnel was planned in the station's design. The BRT had agreed to build the loops in September 1913, and, according to a 1916 report, the connection had been completed for just over $740,000 (equivalent to $21,894,495 in 2025). However, the connection was never opened because the BRT did not want to pay the annual rental fee that was mandated for the usage of the connection. The overpass across William Street was closed in 1913 to make way for the proposed connection. In 1929, the overpass was reopened after it became clear that the connection would not be built. The finished portions of the tunnel to the Brooklyn Bridge led directly to wine vaults under the bridge. The masonry and steel ramp connecting to the Brooklyn Bridge was demolished in the early 1950s when the bridge's elevated tracks were removed.

Three years after the Chambers Street station opened, its platforms were so overcrowded that one New York Times article described them as "more dangerous during the rush hours than at the Grand Central or the Fourteenth Street Stations", in part because more space was devoted to stairways than to platforms. In 1921, the BRT added a first-aid room at the northern end of the Chambers Street station's center island platform; at the time, the IRT's Brooklyn Bridge station also had a first-aid room. The next year, the Wagner Engineering Company installed red-white-and-green navigational signs at the BMT station, in conjunction with the addition of navigational signs to the IRT station. The station's platforms originally could only fit six 67-foot-long (20 m) cars. In April 1926, the New York City Board of Transportation (BOT) received bids for the lengthening of platforms at three stations on the Centre Street Loop, including the Chambers Street station, to accommodate eight-car trains. The Board of Estimate approved funds for the project in July 1926, and the extensions were completed in 1927, bringing the length of the platforms to 535 feet (163 m).

By the mid-1920s, the subway itself was pushing the city's population north and leaving Chambers Street behind. Nonetheless, the city government agreed in 1927 to extend the Nassau Street Line from the Chambers Street station south to the Montague Street Tunnel to Brooklyn, as was required under the Dual Contracts. The extension would permit trains from southern Brooklyn to loop through Lower Manhattan without reversing direction (a service pattern known as the Nassau Street Loop), rather than using the Manhattan Bridge and terminating at Chambers Street. The line was completed in 1931, and the Chambers Street station became a through station. At this point, the BMT's center island platform and the two side platforms were closed. A new northern mezzanine was built in 1938 when the entrances under the north side of the Municipal Building were closed. This mezzanine was built by the Cayuga Construction Company.

==== 1960s to present ====
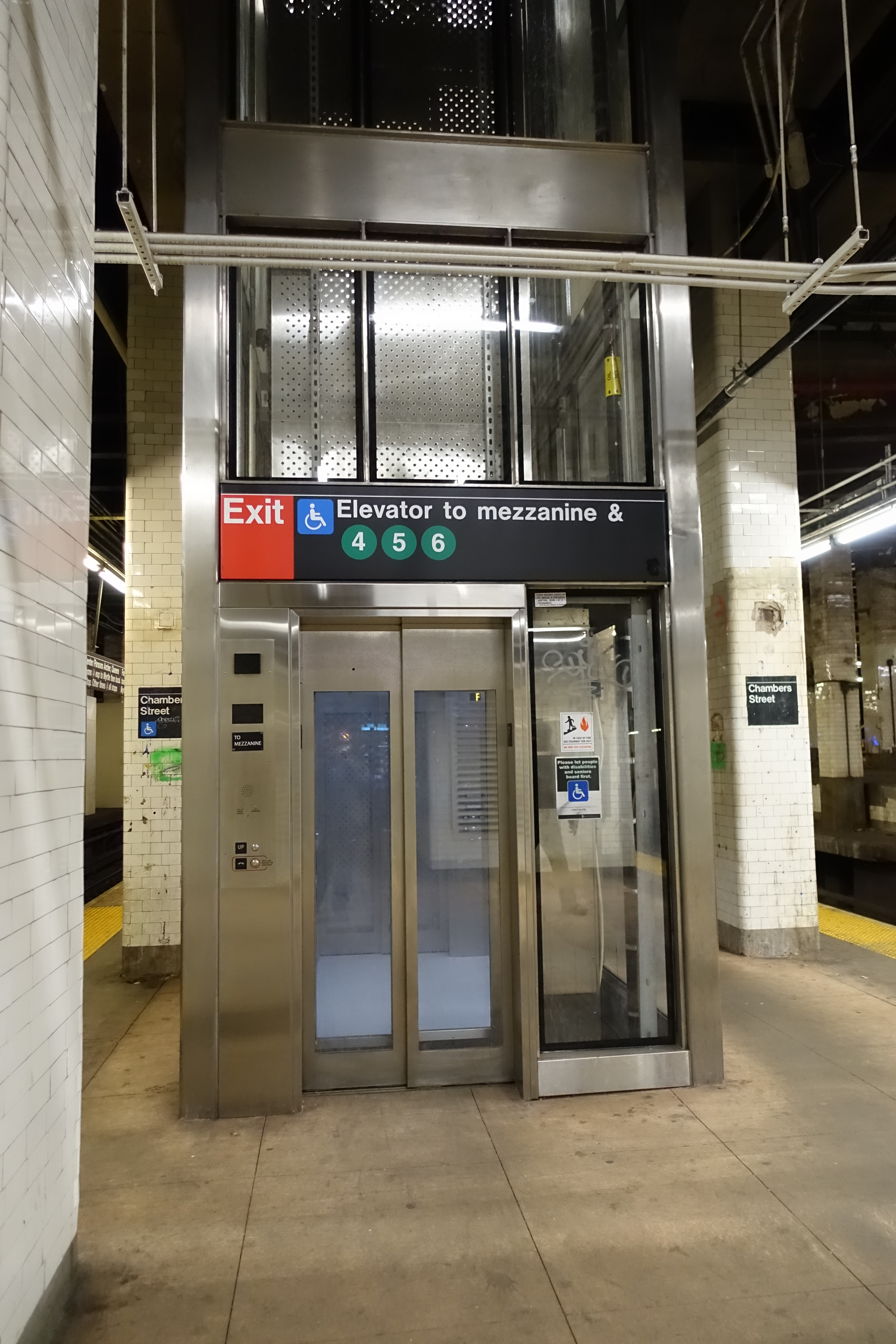
An elevator at the Chambers Street station, opened in 2020

The western side platform was demolished with the expansion of the IRT station between 1960 and 1962. The Chrystie Street Connection, opened in 1967, severed the Nassau Street Line's connection to the Manhattan Bridge, so that the bridge tracks could connect instead to the uptown IND Sixth Avenue Line. The new connection preserved Nassau Street service via the Montague Street Tunnel, but trains were no longer able to run in a loop. In 1990, all weekend service on the Nassau Street Line was eliminated south of Chambers Street; this continued until 2015.

By 2000, the MTA had announced plans to make the Chambers Street station ADA-accessible. The agency had been required in 1994 to create a list of 100 "key stations" that it planned to make ADA-accessible, and the Chambers Street station was one of the last "key stations" to be selected. The Chambers Street station, having fallen into disuse over the years, was voted the ugliest station in the system in a 2003 poll of railfans. The station's token booths were shuttered in May 2005, after fare tokens were replaced with MetroCards; station agents were deployed elsewhere in the station to answer passengers' queries. This was part of a pilot program that was tested at seven other stations.

The MTA announced in May 2018 that it would start renovating the Chambers Street station that August. At the time, local news station NY1 said: "It is easily one of the most decrepit stations in the city's entire system", and a writer for The Village Voice said that the station "was the undisputed poster station of the system's decay". A contract for the elevators' construction was awarded in August 2018. The station received two elevators to the platforms, as well as three new ramps in the mezzanine: one in the corridor between the IRT and BMT stations, and one from the BMT mezzanine to each platform elevators. The station platforms were modified to reduce the gap between trains and the platform edges, and a pedestrian bridge was installed above the tracks, connecting both of the open platforms. To accommodate the ramps, elevators, and pedestrian bridge, portions of the station and mezzanine were removed or reconfigured. These improvements made the station compliant with the ADA, and were funded as part of the 2015–2019 MTA Capital Program. The project was to take at least 24 months to be completed. The elevators had opened by September 1, 2020.

In 2023, the MTA began planning to renovate the Chambers Street and 190th Street stations for a combined $100 million; the work would involve "historically sensitive" repairs, as both stations are on the NRHP. The project was to be funded by congestion pricing in New York City, but the renovation was postponed in June 2024 after the implementation of congestion pricing was delayed. The MTA was preparing to solicit bids for the renovation by January 2026 after congestion pricing had been implemented. The MTA announced in August 2026 that work would begin later that year. The agency also announced plans for a thermal energy cooling system at the BMT station, which would function in tandem with the IRT station's cooling system; there would be a thermal energy storage facility under one of the Chambers Street station's platforms. A $119 million contract to renovate the station was awarded to the joint venture Forte-Citnalta JV in November 2026.

== Station layout ==
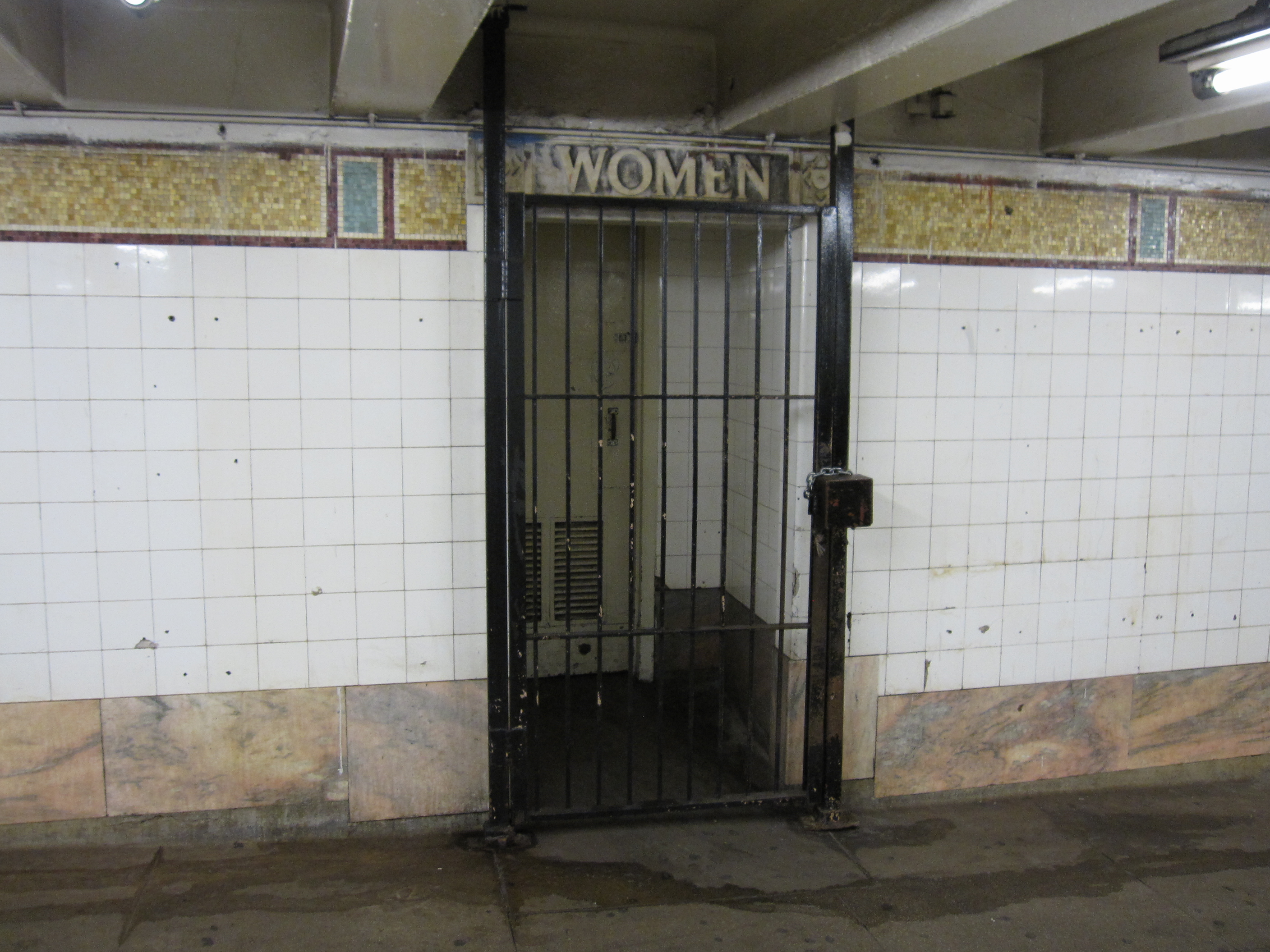
Abandoned women's restroom, with its corresponding stone lintel, in the southern BMT mezzanine

The IRT and BMT platforms both run in a north–south direction, with the BMT platforms to the east of the IRT platforms. Just below street level, there are two overpasses above the IRT platforms, one at the center of the station and another near the south end. There is also an underpass at the extreme north end of the station. The underpass and northern overpass date from the 1962 renovation while the southern overpass is part of the original circulation plan. The overpasses connect each platform with the exits and the BMT's southern mezzanine, and contain wrought iron balustrades. A pedestrian corridor runs above the eastern side of the IRT station.

The BMT mezzanine level, slightly lower than the IRT mezzanine level, is split into north and south sections, with various offices and service rooms in the unused portions of both mezzanines. The connection to the IRT is within the southern mezzanine. The mezzanines contain tiled piers and walls, with pink wainscoting. Along the tops of the walls are yellow mosaic-tile bands with white-and-red surrounds and blue rectangular panels. The north mezzanine has a section of rectangular yellow tiled wall dating to the 1962 renovation. There is a doorway in the south mezzanine, topped by a stone lintel reading "Women", which formerly led to a women's restroom.

=== Exits ===
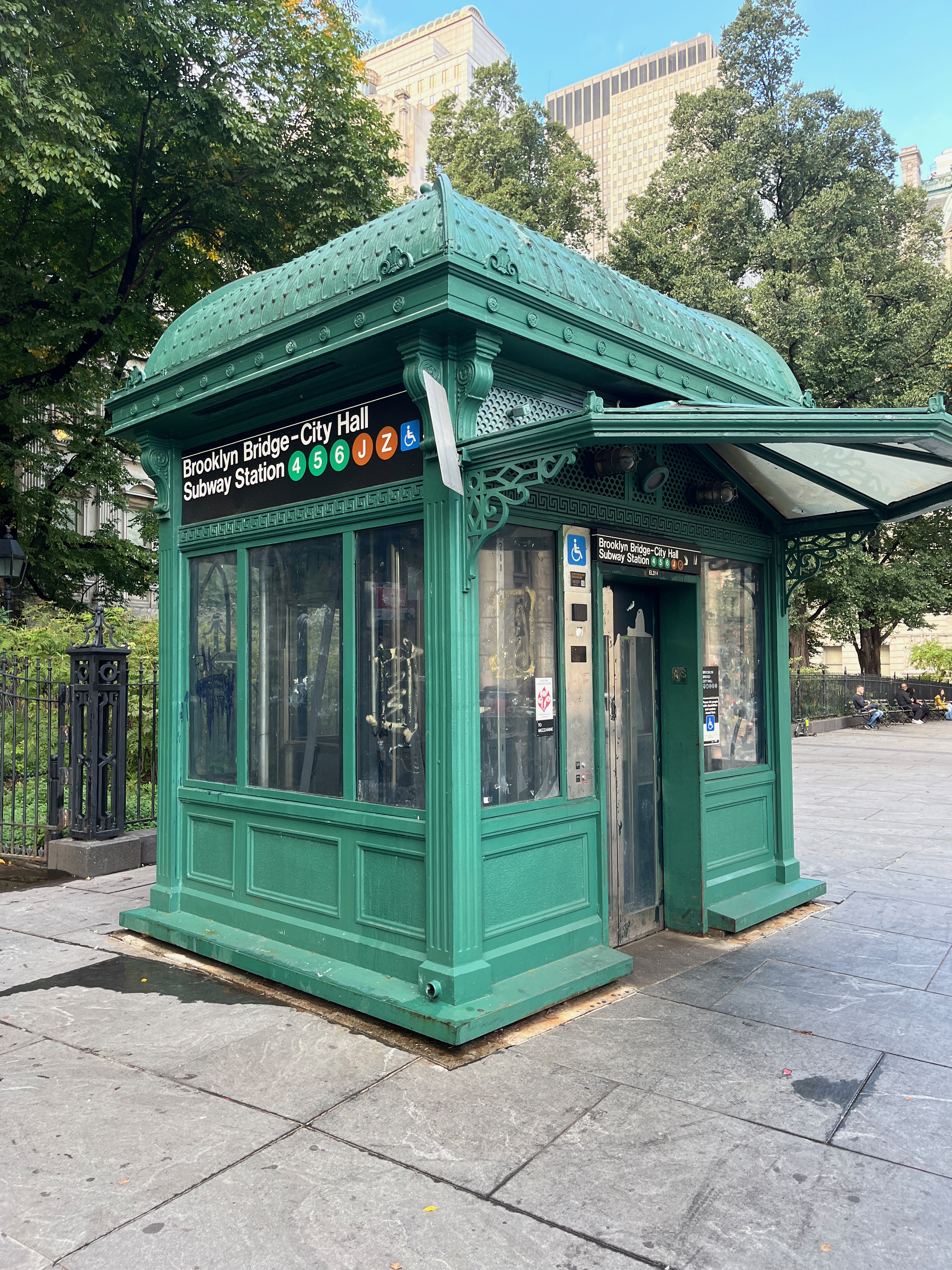
Elevator kiosk, made in the style of original IRT subway entrance kiosks

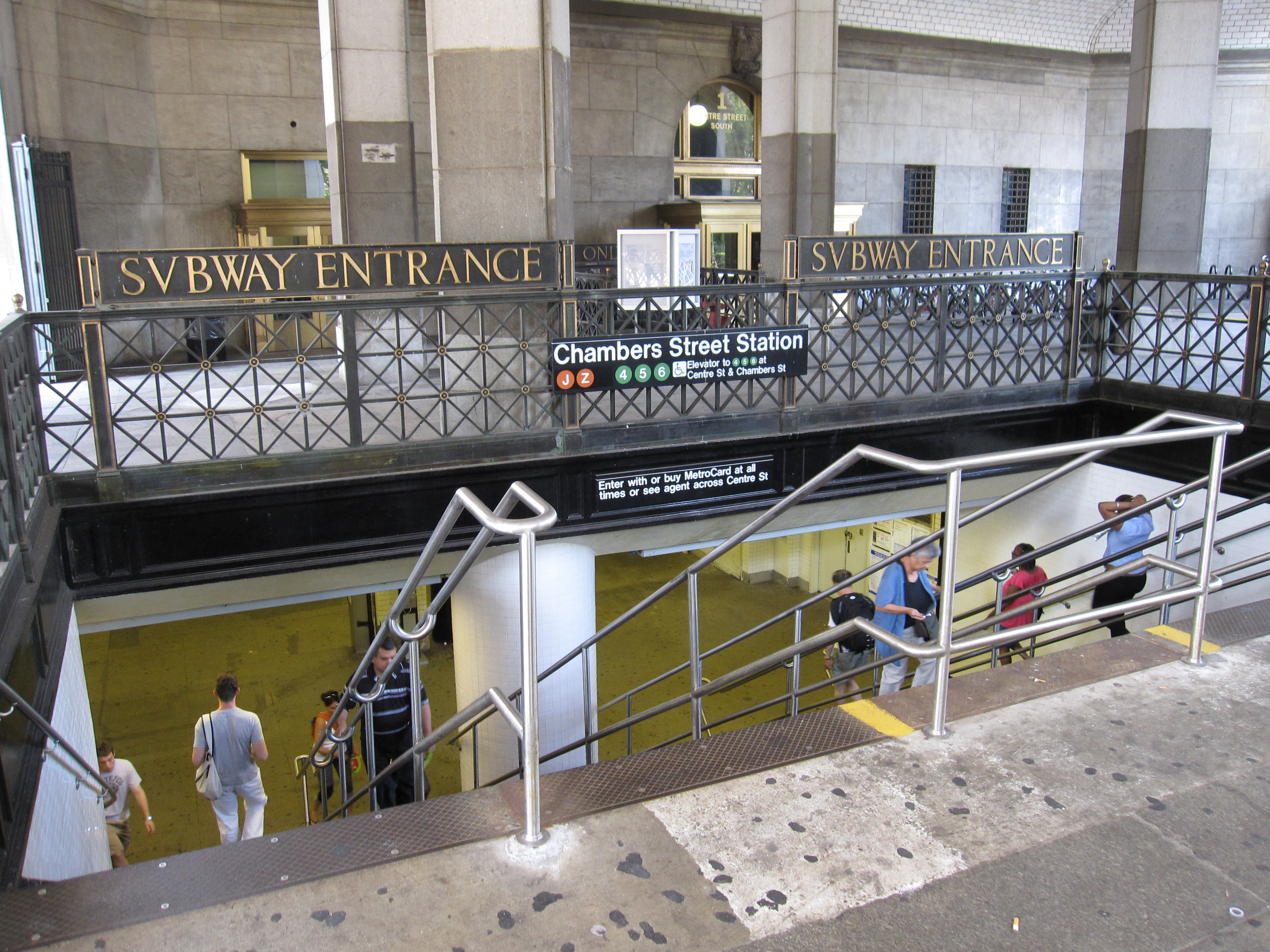
Renovated Municipal Building entrance

At the north end of the complex, two stairs extend from the IRT underpass to the northwestern corner of Reade and Centre Streets. The IRT underpass continues to the northern BMT mezzanine, where a stair rises to the southern end of Foley Square.

At the center of the complex, a wide stair under the southern side of the Manhattan Municipal Building, just southeast of the intersection of Centre and Chambers Streets, serves the southern BMT mezzanine, and was one of the original BMT entrances. The wide stair has a bronze latticed balustrade, as well as plaques with the words svbway entrance. This stair measures 64 feet (20 m) wide and, at the time of the BMT station's construction, could accommodate 1,280 passengers per minute.

Two stairs and an elevator rise from the western side of the IRT mezzanine to City Hall Park, just southwest of the intersection of Centre and Chambers Streets, in front of the Tweed Courthouse. The stairs are part of the IRT station's original entrance. The elevator, a replica of an original IRT subway entrance kiosk, opened in 1992 and was designed by Urbahn Associates. A long passageway at the eastern side of the IRT mezzanine leads to a stair within a plaza just south of the Manhattan Municipal Building. This exit is smaller and faces the large BMT entrance under the building. At the far south end, two stairs rise to the south side of Frankfort Street, in front of Pace University's One Pace Plaza building.

Several entrances have been closed and slabbed over. One stair from the IRT mezzanine led directly to the Brooklyn Bridge walkway, and was removed by August 2000 as part of a project to widen the bridge walkway. Another stair rose from the northern BMT mezzanine to the northwestern corner of Centre Street and Duane Street (east of the current Foley Square entrance), though this was also sealed by 1992 to reduce the maintenance costs associated with maintaining two adjacent staircases. The northern BMT mezzanine contained bronze doors on the east wall, now sealed, which led to the Thurgood Marshall United States Courthouse. Under the northern side of the Manhattan Municipal Building were additional subway staircases, although this entrance area was closed by 1938. The largest staircase under the Municipal Building's northern section was 43 feet (13 m) wide and could originally accommodate 800 passengers per minute.

== BMT Nassau Street Line platforms ==
Chambers Street
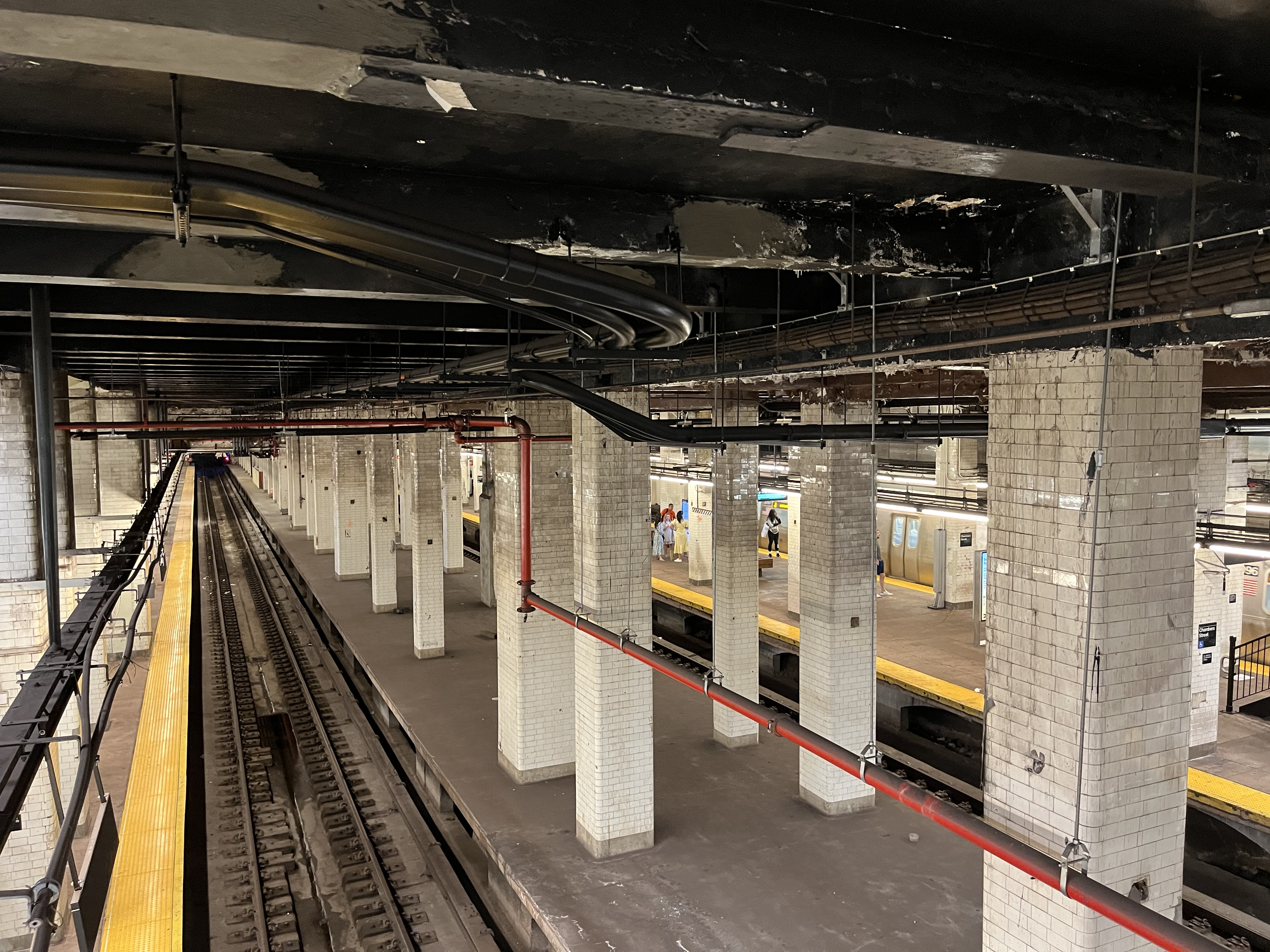
- View of the station from the pedestrian overpass, facing north

Station statistics
- Division: B (BMT)
- Line: BMT Nassau Street Line
- Services: J (all times); Z (rush hours, peak direction)
- Structure: Underground
- Platforms: 3 island platforms (1 disused), 2 side platforms (1 demolished, 1 disused)
- Tracks: 4 (2 in regular service)

Other information
- Opened: August 4, 1913; 113 years ago
- Accessible: Yes
Services
Preceding station	New York City Subway	Following station
Canal Street J Z toward Jamaica Center–York College	J/Z (New York City Subway service)	Fulton Street J Z toward Broad Street
Non-revenue services and lines
Preceding station	New York City Subway	Following station
	no service	Myrtle Avenue no tracks; demolished
Track layout
Station service legend
Symbol	Description
Stops all times	Stops all times
Stops rush hours in the peak direction only	Stops rush hours in the peak direction only
Stops weekday evenings only	Stops weekday evenings only
- Chambers Street Subway Station (Dual System BMT)
- U.S. National Register of Historic Places
- New York State Register of Historic Places
- MPS: New York City Subway System MPS
- NRHP reference No.: 05000669
- NYSRHP No.: 06101.015187

Significant dates
- Added to NRHP: July 6, 2005
- Designated NYSRHP: May 11, 2005

The Chambers Street station on the BMT Nassau Street Line is beneath the Manhattan Municipal Building, stretching from Duane Street in the north to a point just south of Chambers Street to the south. The J stops here at all times and the Z stops here during rush hours in the peak direction. The station is between Canal Street to the north and Fulton Street to the south.

The Chambers Street station has four tracks, three island platforms, and one side platform (originally two); the westernmost side platform has been demolished, while the center island platform and the easternmost side platform are unused. Terminating trains use the inner tracks while through trains use the outer tracks. From the BMT station, there are stairs and elevators leading to the mezzanines above. The easternmost side platform had seven stairs, while the center island platform and the westernmost side platform had six stairs. The eastern island platform has five stairs and the western island platform has four stairs. The elevators are at the southern ends of the western and eastern island platforms.

The station is approximately 537 feet (164 m) long and 120 feet (37 m) wide. Both of the platforms in revenue service are 23 feet (7.0 m) wide; the northbound platform is 534 feet (163 m) long, while the southbound platform is 520 feet (160 m) long. The southbound platform is slightly higher at the southern end of the station because, south of the station, the line becomes a bi-level tunnel with the southbound track stacked above the northbound one.

=== Design ===
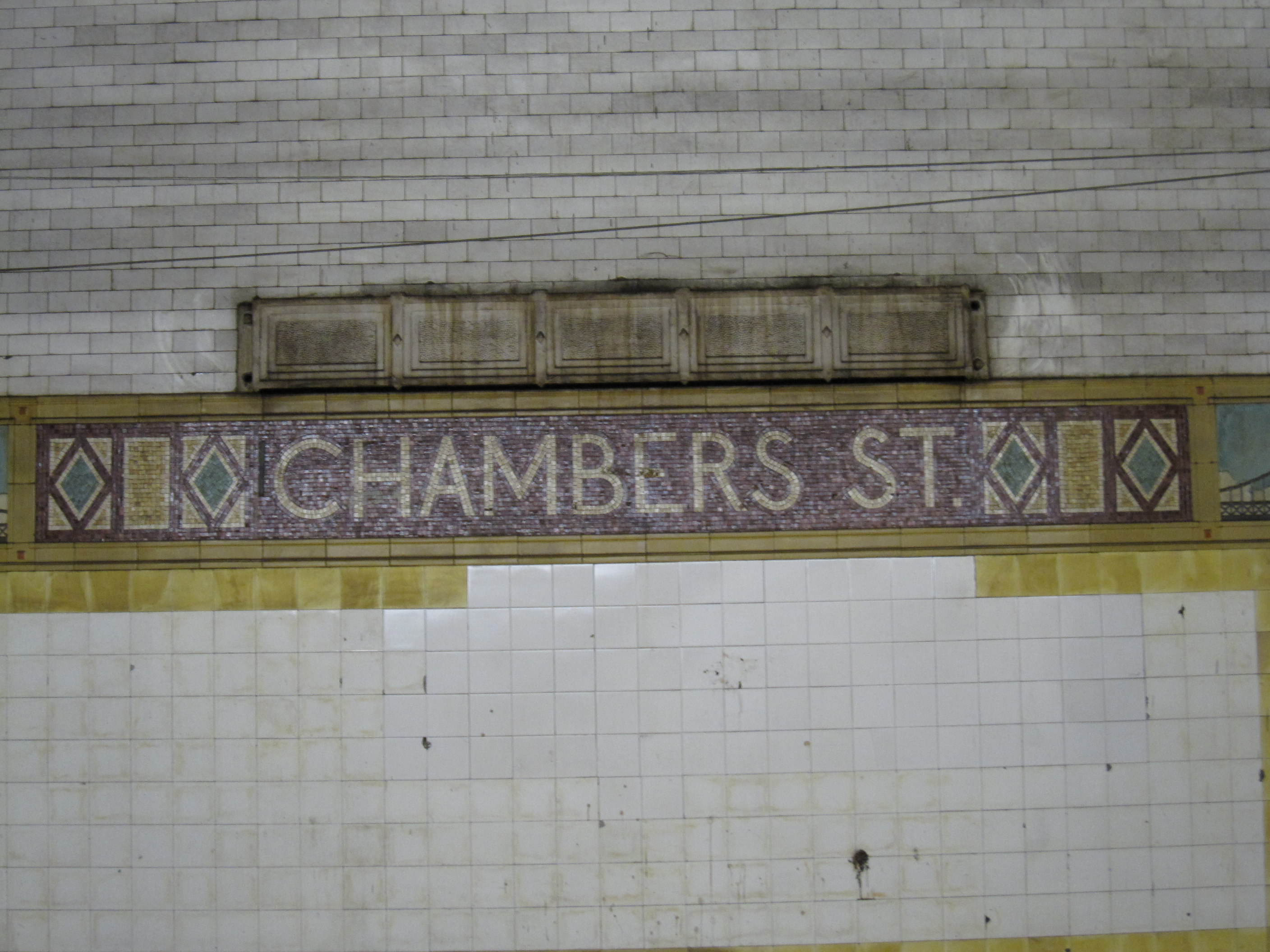
Name of the station in mosaics

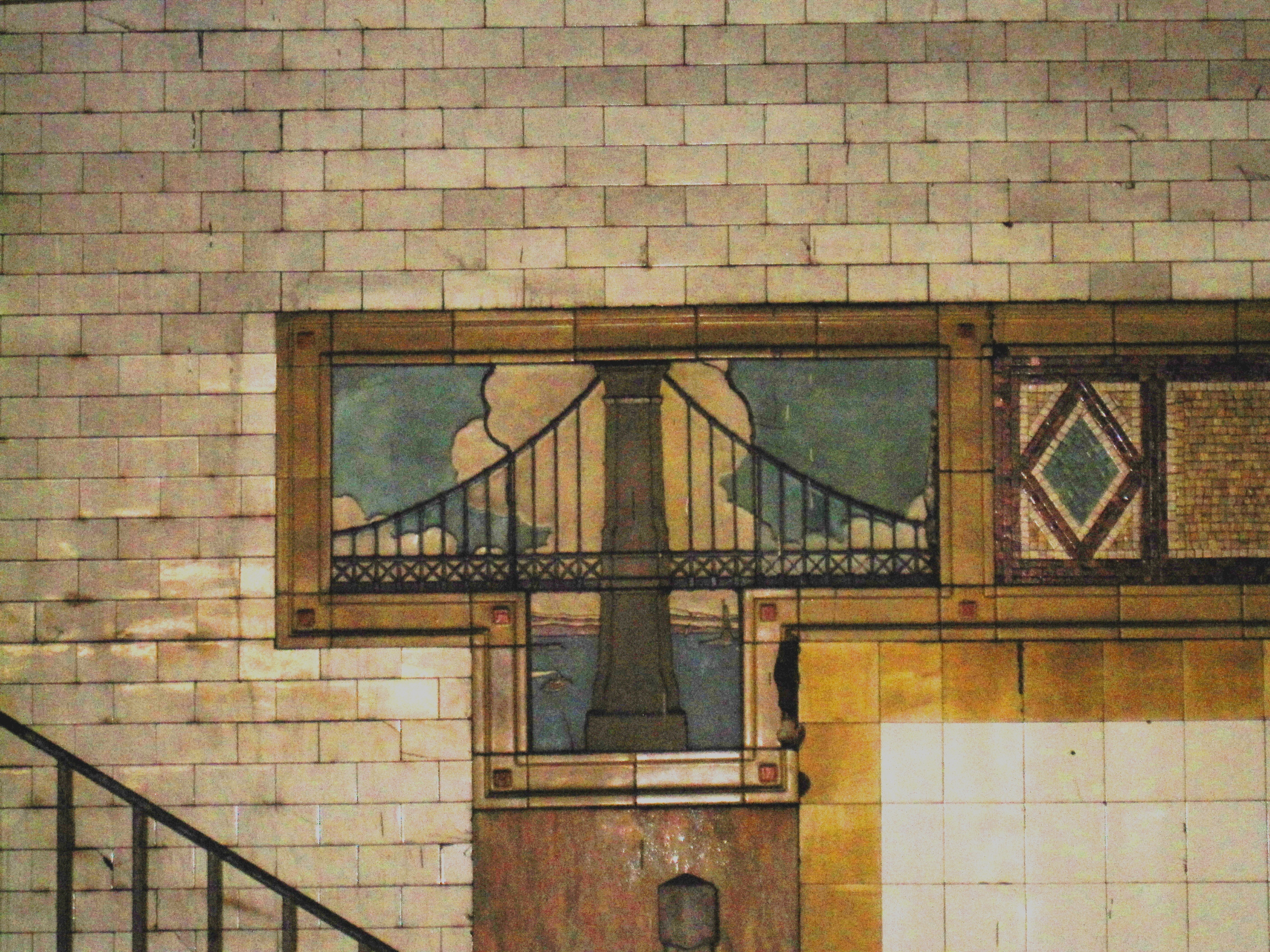
Ceramic tile with Brooklyn Bridge

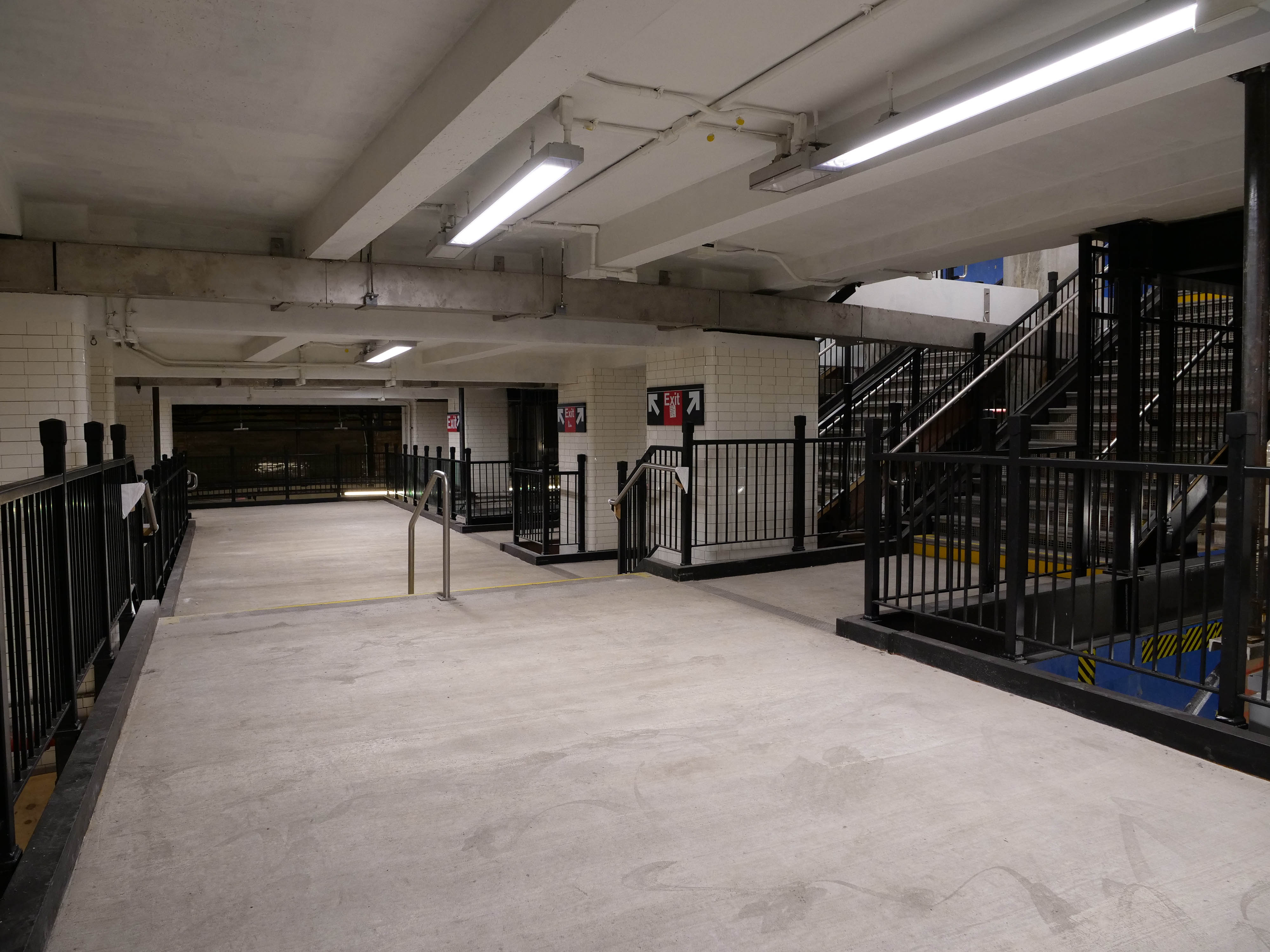
Pedestrian overpass added as part of the 2019 renovation

Like the IRT station, the tunnel is covered by a U-shaped trough that contains utility pipes and wires. The bottom of this trough contains a foundation of concrete no less than 4 inches (100 mm) thick. Each platform consists of 3-inch-thick (76 mm) concrete slabs, beneath which are drainage basins. The platforms contain double-height, tile-clad columns spaced every 15 feet (4.6 m), which support the jack-arched concrete station roofs. There is a 1-inch (25 mm) gap between the trough wall and the platform walls, which are made of 4-inch (100 mm)-thick brick covered over by a tiled finish. The ceiling is double-height above much of the station's length, but drops beneath the south mezzanine and the original north mezzanine.

The westernmost side platform was tiled over during the 1962 renovation; it contains yellow tiles and a cream trim line with chambers st written on it in black sans-serif font at regular intervals. The easternmost side platform retains most of its original decoration, with pink marble wainscoting, as well as pink marble pilasters spaced every 15 feet (4.6 m). Between the pilasters and above the wainscoting are panels made of white tile, with gold-tiled borders. A maroon, blue, and gold tile frieze runs atop each panel, interrupted by T-shaped ceramic plaques with depictions of the Brooklyn Bridge, which are situated atop each pilaster. The Brooklyn Bridge ceramic tiles display the bridge's vertical cables but do not depict its diagonal cables. At intervals of every three panels, there are tile plaques with the station's name in place of the frieze. Sections of the original design, including the ceiling and walls, are heavily damaged or deteriorated.

=== Track layout ===
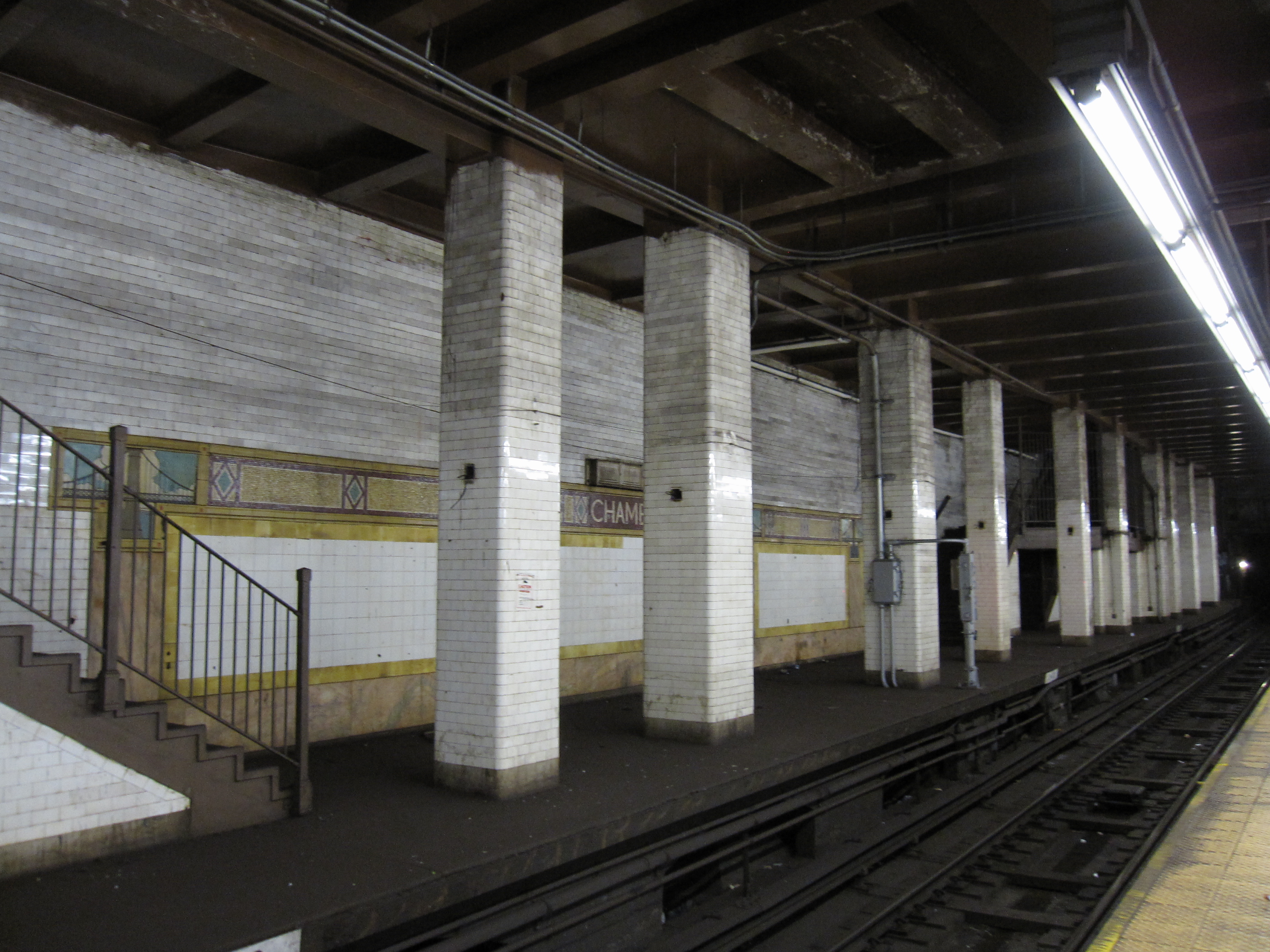
Easternmost side platform, abandoned

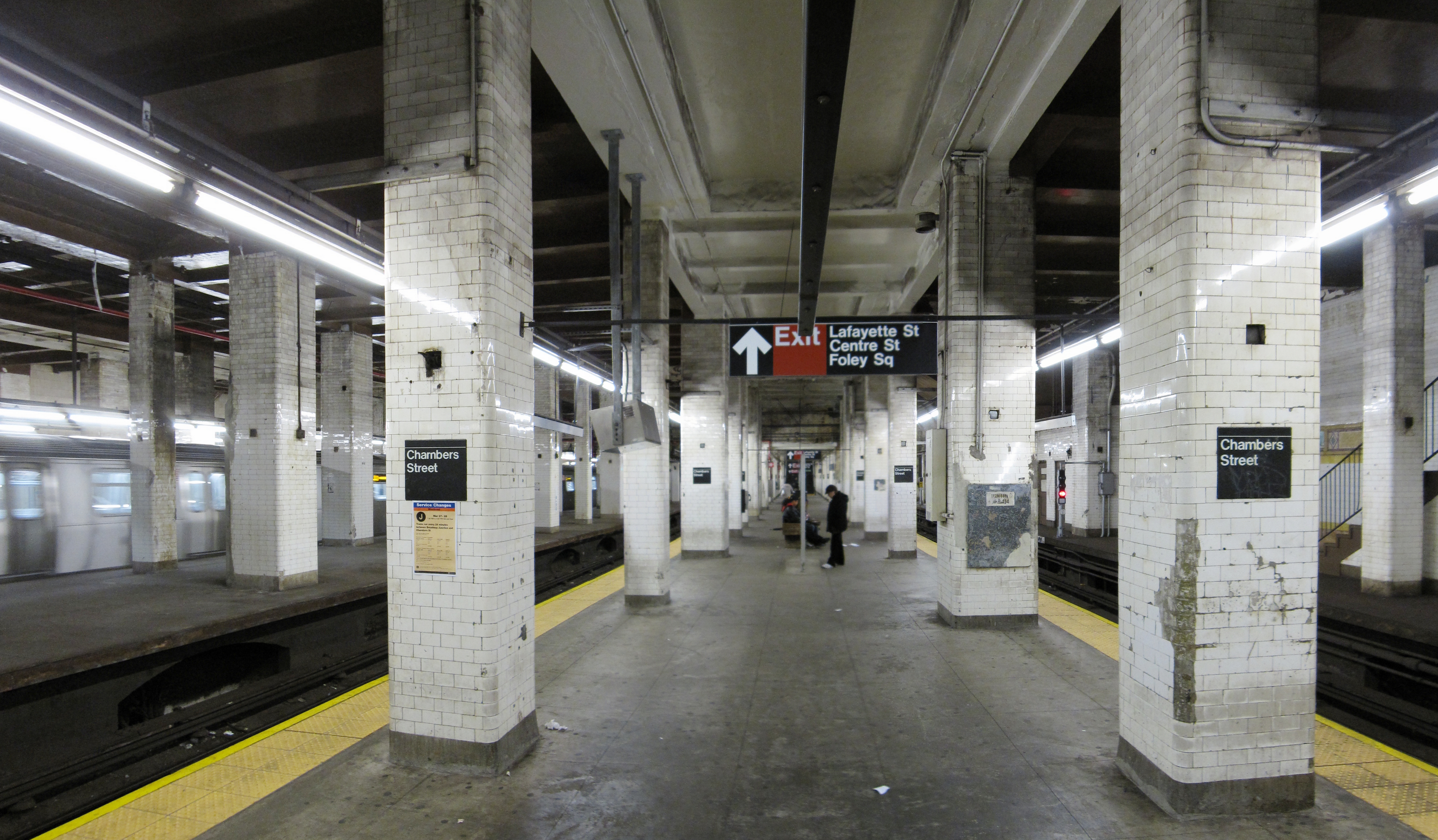
Eastern island platform, in use

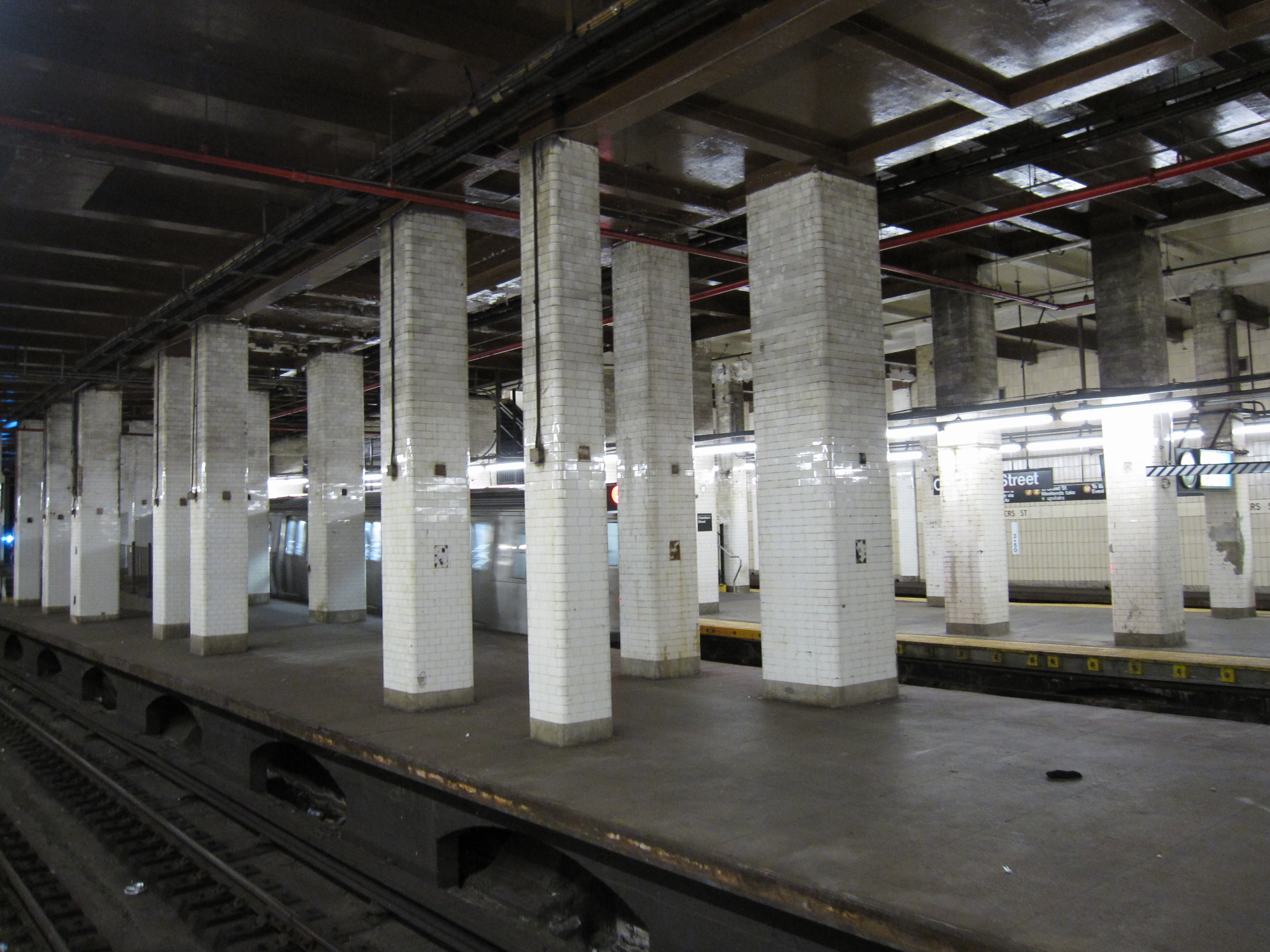
Center island platform, abandoned

The two "express" tracks, currently unused in regular revenue service, merge into a single tail track south of the station. The tail track is 620 feet (190 m) long from the switch points to the bumper block, where an emergency exit is available. Before the extension to Broad Street opened, the two westernmost (now southbound) tracks ramped up to just before the portal from the Brooklyn Bridge, ending at a wooden gate. These tracks did not have any third rails and were never used.

North of this station, there are numerous switches connecting all four tracks. The easternmost two tracks are stubs that end behind the now-closed Queens-bound side platform. These tracks were formerly connected to the south tracks of the Manhattan Bridge, until they were disconnected in 1967 as part of the Chrystie Street Connection, with the BMT Broadway Line being connected to the south tracks instead. Also north of this station, the former southbound express track (now the northbound track) splits into two tracks just south of Canal Street: the former northbound local track, and the former southbound express track (the current northbound track).

== IRT Lexington Avenue Line platforms ==
Brooklyn Bridge–City Hall
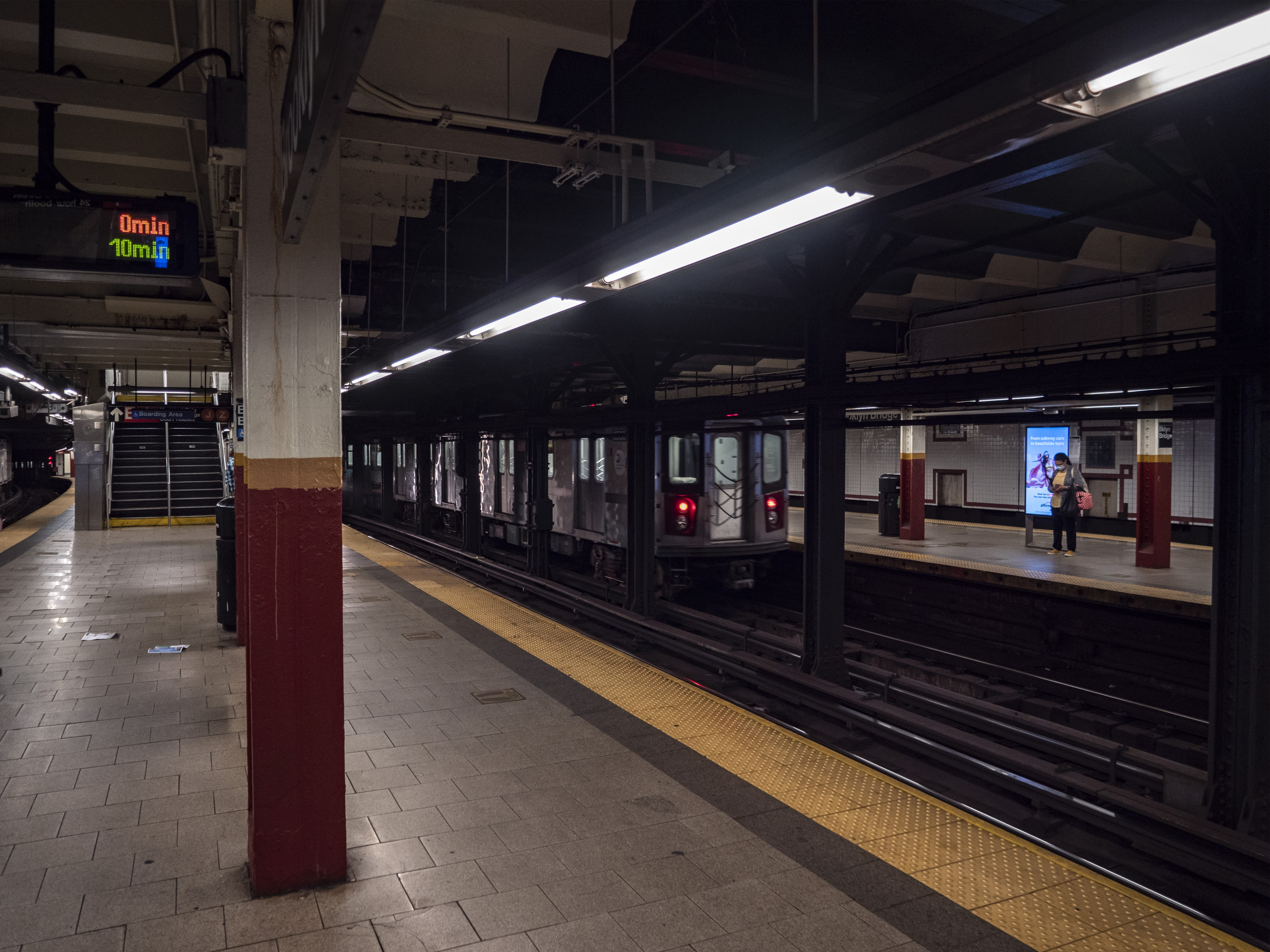
- A northbound R142 5 train leaving the station

Station statistics
- Address: Park Row & Centre Street; New York, New York
- Division: A (IRT)
- Line: IRT Lexington Avenue Line
- Services: 4 (all times); 5 (all times except late nights); 6 (all times) <6> (weekdays until 8:45 p.m., peak direction)
- Structure: Underground
- Platforms: 2 island platforms (in service) cross-platform interchange 2 side platforms (abandoned)
- Tracks: 4

Other information
- Opened: October 27, 1904; 122 years ago
- Accessible: Yes
- Former/other names: Brooklyn Bridge–Chambers Street; Chambers Street-City Hall; Brooklyn Bridge-Worth Street
Services
Preceding station	New York City Subway	Following station
14th Street–Union Square 4 5 via 138th Street–Grand Concourse	Express	Fulton Street 4 5 via Franklin Avenue–Medgar Evers College
Canal Street 4 6 <6> toward Pelham Bay Park	Local	Terminus
Non-revenue services and lines
Preceding station	New York City Subway	Following station
Worth Street local; closed	no service	City Hall local; closed
Track layout
Station service legend
Symbol	Description
Stops all times	Stops all times
Stops all times except late nights	Stops all times except late nights
Stops late nights only	Stops late nights only
Stops rush hours in the peak direction only	Stops rush hours in the peak direction only
- Brooklyn Bridge-City Hall Subway Station (IRT)
- U.S. National Register of Historic Places
- New York State Register of Historic Places
- MPS: New York City Subway System MPS
- NRHP reference No.: 05000674
- NYSRHP No.: 06101.007644

Significant dates
- Added to NRHP: July 6, 2005
- Designated NYSRHP: May 11, 2005

The Brooklyn Bridge–City Hall station is an express station on the IRT Lexington Avenue Line, beneath Centre Street. It stretches between a point just south of Duane Street, to the north, and Park Row, to the south. The 4 and 6 trains stop here at all times; the 5 train stops here at all times except late nights; and the <6> train stops here during weekdays in the peak direction. The 5 train always makes express stops, and the 6 and <6> trains always make local stops; the 4 train makes express stops during the day and local stops at night. The next station to the north is Canal Street for local trains and 14th Street–Union Square for express trains. The next station to the south for 4 and 5 trains is Fulton Street. The station is the southern terminus for 6 and <6> trains, which turn via the City Hall Loop to head back uptown. When the subway opened, the next local stop to the north was Worth Street, and the next local stop to the south was City Hall; both of these stations were closed in the mid-20th century.

The Brooklyn Bridge–City Hall station contains four tracks, two island platforms, and two unused side platforms. Departing passengers are asked to watch the gap upon leaving the train at this station. From each island platform, one elevator and one stair lead to the station's southern overpass, two stairs lead to the northern overpass, and one stair leads to the north-end underpass. The island platforms allow for cross-platform interchanges between local and express trains heading in the same direction. Terminating trains use the outer tracks while through trains use the inner tracks. The station is approximately 537 feet (164 m) long and 85 feet (26 m) wide. The island platforms were originally 295 feet (90 m) long but were lengthened to about 523 feet (159 m) during the 1962 renovation. The northbound platform ranges from 18 to 21 feet (5.5 to 6.4 m) wide, while the southbound platform ranges from 16 to 20 feet (4.9 to 6.1 m) wide. Platform extensions are at both ends of the original platforms. The ones at the south end are closed off, but contain gap fillers and original mosaic tiles. The 1962 platform extensions are at the north end; it was deemed easier to lengthen the express platform northward, as the curves at the south end were extremely difficult to reconstruct.

There are two unused side platforms, one beside either local track. A combination of island and side platforms was also used at 14th Street–Union Square on the IRT Lexington Avenue Line and 96th Street on the IRT Broadway–Seventh Avenue Line. These side platforms were built to accommodate extra passenger volume and were built to the five-car length of the original IRT local trains. When trains were lengthened, the side platforms were deemed obsolete, and they were closed and walled off in 1962. The side platforms house electrical equipment and are blocked off with metal grates. A staircase from the western side of the mezzanine leads to the original western side platform. A sliding grate was installed on the bottom of the deck leading to the eastern side platform, which was used to prevent access to that platform when it was not in service.

=== Design ===
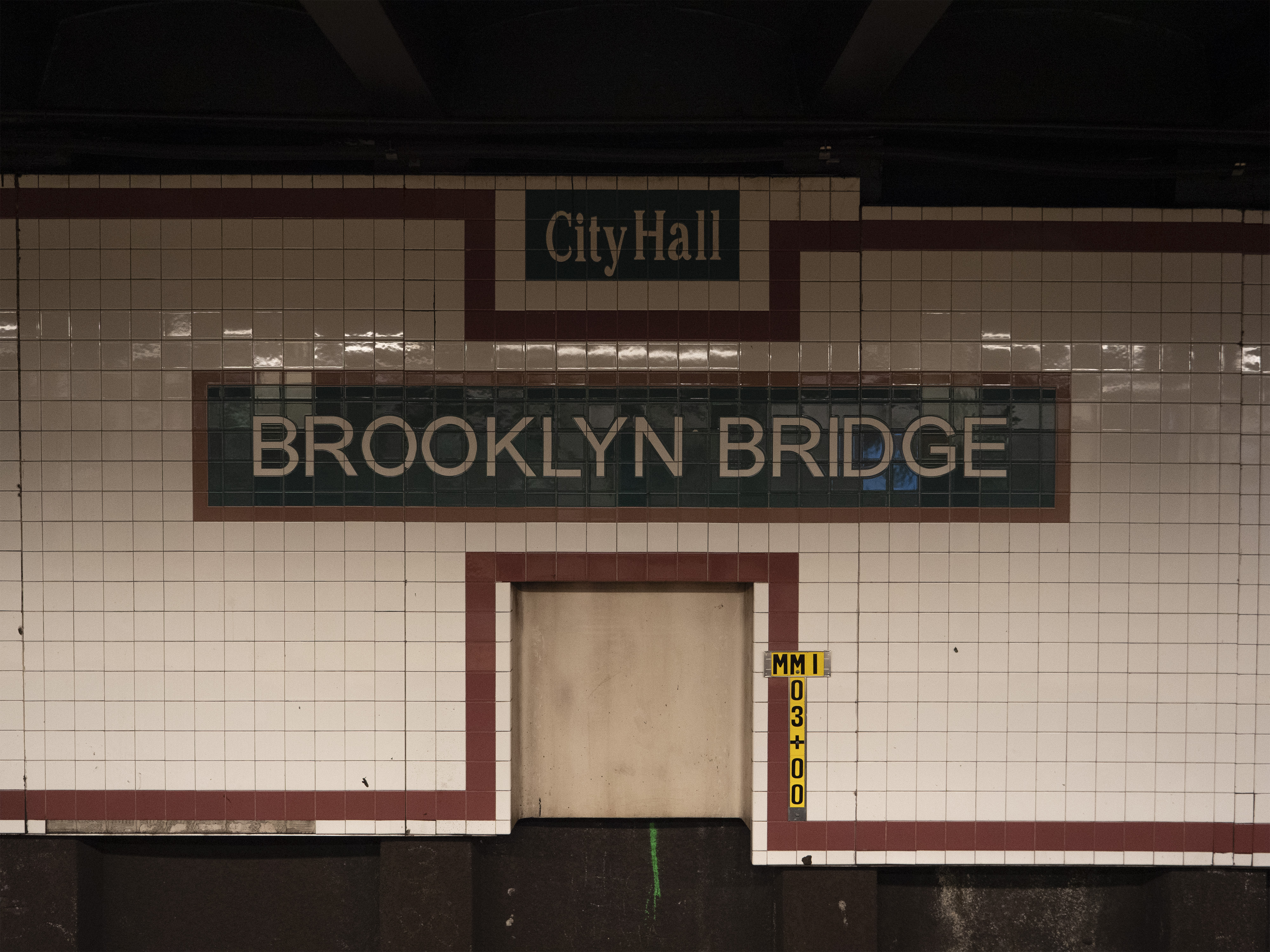
Name mosaic, platform level

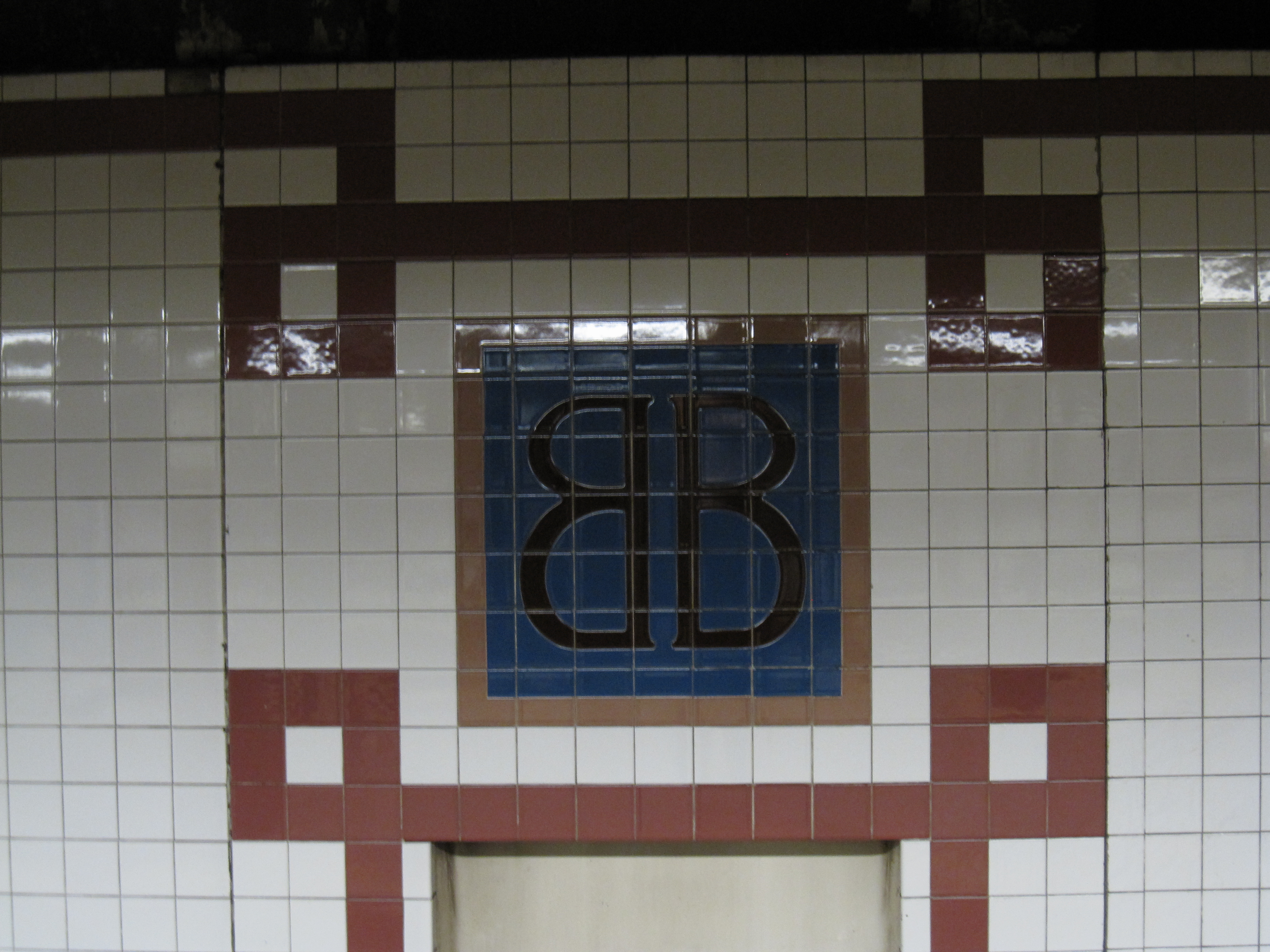
Abbreviation mosaic with back-to-back "B"s, platform level

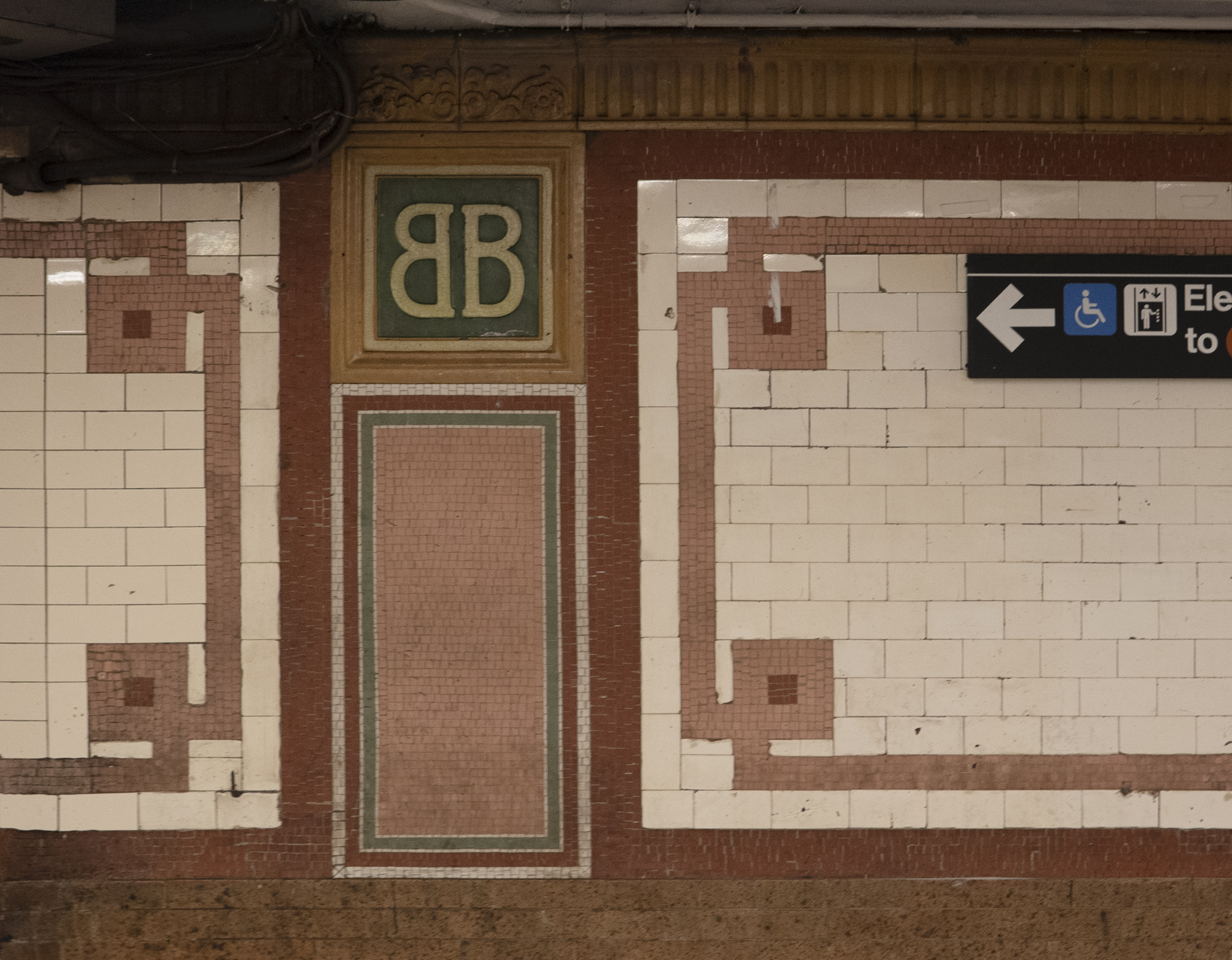
Original abbreviation mosaic with back-to-back "B"s, mezzanine

As with other stations built as part of the original IRT, the station was constructed using a cut-and-cover method. The tunnel is covered by a U-shaped trough that contains utility pipes and wires. This trough contains a foundation of concrete no less than 4 inches (100 mm) thick. Each platform consists of 3-inch-thick (76 mm) concrete slabs, beneath which are drainage basins. The platforms contain I-beam columns spaced every 15 feet (4.6 m). Additional columns between the tracks, spaced every 5 feet (1.5 m), support the jack-arched concrete station roofs. There is a 1-inch (25 mm) gap between the trough wall and the platform walls, which are made of 4-inch (100 mm)-thick brick covered over by a tiled finish.

The westernmost side platform retains ten faience plaques of eagles, made by the Grueby Faience Company, which are not visible to the public. The easternmost side platform also has eagle faience plaques and mosaic tablets, also not visible to the public. These plaques and tablets were in the original design, but they had been concealed behind a wall of beige tiles by the late 20th century. The walls adjacent to the tracks are decorated with modern white tiles, surrounded near the top and bottom by red tile bands. The bands wrap around alcoves that are placed at regular intervals on the walls. The spaces above the alcoves contain black-on-green plaques with back-to-back "B"s, which alternate with white-on-green tablets with the words brooklyn bridge in Arial font. Smaller white-on-green plaques with the words "City Hall" are above the brooklyn bridge tablets. The back-to-back "B"s, and the white walls with red tile bands, are also used in the design of the mezzanine. However, the wall of the eastern corridor retains some original design, with brick wainscoting, marble pilasters, and original cream-on-olive plaques with back-to-back "B"s. The mosaic tiles at all original IRT stations were manufactured by the American Encaustic Tile Company, which subcontracted the installations at each station.

As part of the MTA Arts & Design program, Mark Gibian created a sculpture for the station, titled Cable Crossing, in 1996. The sculpture consists of numerous cables in the fare control area of the IRT mezzanine, a reference to the nearby Brooklyn Bridge. Some of the cables are placed under a glass skylight; this part of the artwork measures 11 inches (280 mm) thick and 28.42 by 13.33 feet (8.66 by 4.06 m) across. Additional cables are installed on a triptych next to the turnstiles, separating the portions of the mezzanine that are inside and outside of fare control. In creating the sculpture, Gibian said he wanted it to represent "the controlled power of the subway and its network of metal and concrete that undergirds the city".

=== Track layout ===
In New York City Subway chaining, the south end of the station is milepost 0 for the IRT East Side chain; all distances on the line are measured from this point. Just north of the station are crossovers that allow trains to switch between the local and express tracks, which allow Lexington Avenue local trains to continue south via the express tracks if necessary (rather than using the City Hall loop).

South of the station, the downtown local track splits into three tracks. The westernmost track loops around to the northbound local track through the City Hall station. The other two are layup tracks parallel to the downtown express track. Until 1963, they merged into the downtown express track north of Fulton Street. Since then, they have ended at bumper blocks a little north of Fulton Street and are occasionally used for train storage.

== Ridership ==
As a major hub for the IRT and BMT, the Brooklyn Bridge and Chambers Street complex was the subway system's busiest station when it was built. The opening of the IRT station relieved congestion at Park Row Terminal and the City Hall station, two nearby elevated stations. The Brooklyn Bridge station served 18 million passengers a year during the 1910s, amounting to about 50,000 passengers a day. When the Chambers Street station opened, it also suffered from overcrowding. The Brooklyn Bridge/Chambers Street complex was surpassed as the network's busiest station by the Times Square complex in 1923. Even so, the complex recorded nearly 30 million annual passengers in the mid-1920s, while the nearby elevated stations counted another 20 million.

Comparatively few passengers transferred at the Brooklyn Bridge/Chambers Street station, in part because it was easier for BMT passengers to transfer to the IRT at the Canal Street station. By 1930, the Brooklyn Bridge station had 16 million passengers, compared to 12 million at the Chambers Street station. The high ridership at the complex contributed to the closure of the IRT's City Hall Loop in 1945, when the Brooklyn Bridge station still had 14 million annual passengers. By contrast, ridership at the Chambers Street station declined significantly as development in Manhattan moved further northward. The number of passengers entering the Brooklyn Bridge/Chambers Street station declined to about 7.2 million in 1963 and remained almost unchanged in 1973.

By 2011, the Brooklyn Bridge–City Hall/Chambers Street station was the 29th-busiest in the system; at the time, an average of 36,350 riders entered the station every weekday. In 2019, the station had 9,065,146 boardings, making it the 32nd most-used station in the 423-station system. This amounted to an average of 30,961 passengers per weekday. Due to the COVID-19 pandemic in New York City, ridership dropped drastically in 2020, with 2,710,023 passengers entering the station that year. The station had 3,147,136 passengers in 2021, and in 2023, ridership increased to 5,881,022.

== See also ==
- National Register of Historic Places listings in Manhattan below 14th Street
