= Worth Street station =

New York City Subway station in Manhattan (closed 1962)

Worth Street
- Former New York City Subway station
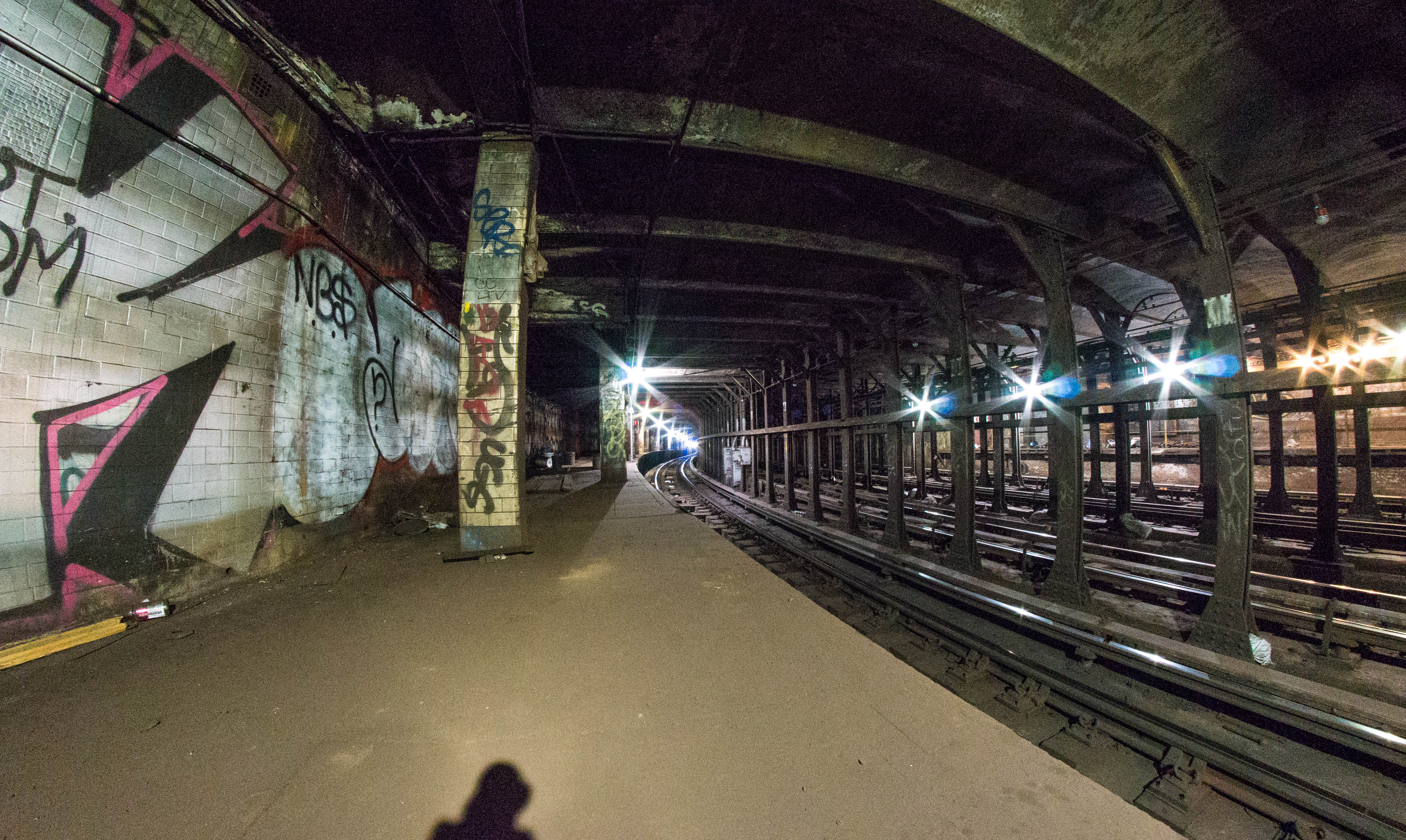
- Platform of the Worth Street station

Station statistics
- Address: Lafayette Street & Worth Street; New York, NY
- Borough: Manhattan
- Locale: Civic Center
- Coordinates: 40.7155°N 74.003°W
- Division: A (IRT)
- Line: IRT Lexington Avenue Line
- Services: None (abandoned)
- Structure: Underground
- Platforms: 2 side platforms
- Tracks: 4

Other information
- Opened: October 27, 1904; 121 years ago
- Closed: September 1, 1962; 64 years ago

Station succession
- Next north: Canal Street
- Next south: Brooklyn Bridge–City Hall
Location
Location within New York City Subway
Location within New York City
Location within New York
Track layout
Street map

The Worth Street station was a local station on the IRT Lexington Avenue Line of the New York City Subway. It is located at Lafayette Street and Worth Street, in Civic Center, Manhattan.

The Worth Street station was constructed for the Interborough Rapid Transit Company (IRT) as part of the city's first subway line, which was approved in 1900. Construction of the line segment that includes the Worth Street station started on July 10 of the same year. The station opened on October 27, 1904, as one of the original 28 stations of the New York City Subway. The southbound platform was lengthened in the late 1940s. The station was closed on September 1, 1962, as a result of a platform lengthening project at Brooklyn Bridge–City Hall.

The Worth Street station contains two abandoned side platforms and four tracks. The station was built with tile and mosaic decorations. Many of these decorations have been covered with graffiti.

== History ==
=== Construction and opening ===
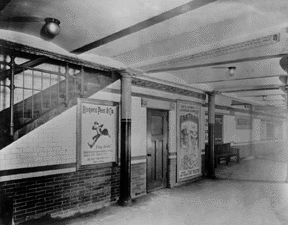
Worth Street when it was completed

Planning for a subway line in New York City dates to 1864. However, development of what would become the city's first subway line did not start until 1894, when the New York State Legislature passed the Rapid Transit Act. The subway plans were drawn up by a team of engineers led by William Barclay Parsons, the Rapid Transit Commission's chief engineer. It called for a subway line from New York City Hall in lower Manhattan to the Upper West Side, where two branches would lead north into the Bronx. A plan was formally adopted in 1897, and all legal conflicts over the route alignment were resolved near the end of 1899. The Rapid Transit Construction Company, organized by John B. McDonald and funded by August Belmont Jr., signed the initial Contract 1 with the Rapid Transit Commission in February 1900, in which it would construct the subway and maintain a 50-year operating lease from the opening of the line. In 1901, the firm of Heins & LaFarge was hired to design the underground stations. Belmont incorporated the Interborough Rapid Transit Company (IRT) in April 1902 to operate the subway.

The Worth Street station was constructed as part of the route segment from Chambers Street to Great Jones Street. Construction on this section of the line began on July 10, 1900, and was awarded to Degnon-McLean Contracting Company. By late 1903, the subway was nearly complete, but the IRT Powerhouse and the system's electrical substations were still under construction, delaying the system's opening. The Worth Street station opened on October 27, 1904, as one of the original 28 stations of the New York City Subway from City Hall to 145th Street on the Broadway–Seventh Avenue Line.

The first collision in the history of the New York City Subway system occurred at the station on January 11, 1905. On that date, the motorman of a southbound Lenox Avenue train did not obey a caution signal at the Spring Street station, which indicated that there was a train ahead between Canal Street and Worth Street, and collided into a Broadway train that was stopped at Worth Street, waiting for a signal to clear. The accident shattered the glass in the rear car of the Broadway train, and the first two cars of the Lenox Avenue train. Six people were hurt by falling glass. The accident could have been averted if the local tracks had had automatic tripping devices, which were present on the express tracks. The installation of these devices on the local tracks was considered to be impractical due to the high frequency of local service. The accident only resulted in a ten-minute delay in service, and after it was determined no people were killed, the trains proceeded in regular service.

=== Service changes and station renovations ===
After the first subway line was completed in 1908, the station was served by local trains along both the West Side (now the Broadway–Seventh Avenue Line to Van Cortlandt Park–242nd Street) and East Side (now the Lenox Avenue Line). West Side local trains had their southern terminus at City Hall during rush hours and South Ferry at other times, and had their northern terminus at 242nd Street. East Side local trains ran from City Hall to Lenox Avenue (145th Street).

On March 20, 1906, the IRT tested a vacuum cleaner connected to a portable wagon plant to clean the station. It found that it was very successful at removing dust from the station's tiling and woodwork, and at removing greasy dirt from girders.

To address overcrowding, in 1909, the New York Public Service Commission proposed lengthening the platforms at stations along the original IRT subway. As part of a modification to the IRT's construction contracts made on January 18, 1910, the company was to lengthen station platforms to accommodate ten-car express and six-car local trains. In addition to $1.5 million (equivalent to $51.8 million in 2025) spent on platform lengthening, $500,000 (equivalent to $17.3 million in 2025) was spent on building additional entrances and exits. It was anticipated that these improvements would increase capacity by 25 percent. The northbound platform of the Worth Street station was extended about 10 feet (3.0 m) northward into the "electric manhole", a passageway leading to the equipment closet. The southbound platform was extended 15 feet (4.6 m) into the "manholes" in either direction. Six-car local trains began operating in October 1910. The Lexington Avenue Line opened north of Grand Central–42nd Street in 1918, and the original line was divided into an H-shaped system. All local trains were sent via the Lexington Avenue Line, running along the Pelham Line in the Bronx.

In December 1922, the Transit Commission approved a $3 million project to lengthen platforms at 14 local stations along the original IRT line, including Worth Street and seven other stations on the Lexington Avenue Line. Platform lengths at these stations would be increased from 225 to 436 feet (69 to 133 m). The commission postponed the platform-lengthening project in September 1923, at which point the cost had risen to $5.6 million.

The city government took over the IRT's operations on June 12, 1940. The downtown platform was lengthened in 1948 by the New York City Board of Transportation, providing for the full length of a ten-car, 514-foot-long (157 m) train. The work was done only on the downtown side to save costs, and that platform was chosen for lengthening since it was the main unloading side in the business district.

=== Closure ===
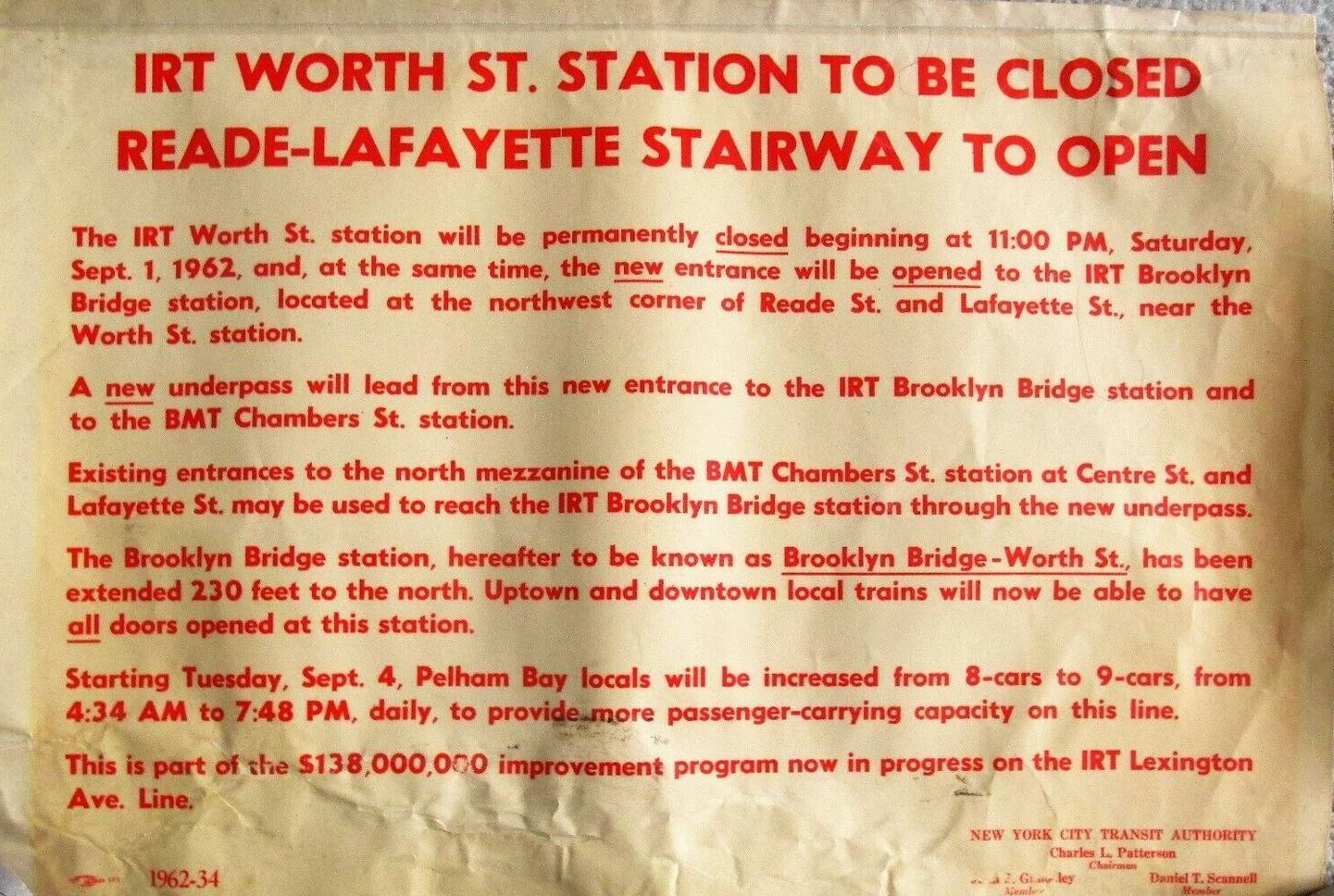
Poster announcing the closure of the station

On January 3, 1957, the New York City Transit Authority announced that this station would be closed within two years as part of a plan to improve the Brooklyn Bridge–City Hall station. As part of the project, the platforms at Brooklyn Bridge would be lengthened to accommodate ten-car trains, and the curved platform at Brooklyn Bridge would be eliminated. In order to achieve both of these goals, the platforms would be extended 250 feet (76 m) to the north. The Worth Street station would be closed as it would only be 600 feet (180 m) feet away from the platforms at Brooklyn Bridge. If the station were retained, service on the line would be slowed down, and there was no suitable signal system that could operate with such a short distance. The project would cost $4.4 million and was projected to take two years.

The station was closed on September 1, 1962, with the completion of work at Brooklyn Bridge. While the opening of new entrance at the northwest corner of Reade Street and Lafayette Street was also scheduled for that date, it ended up opening a week later. After the Worth Street station's closure, Brooklyn Bridge–City Hall was renamed Brooklyn Bridge–Worth Street. This name lasted until at least 1984, though has since fallen out of use.

== Station layout ==
Like other local stations, Worth Street has four tracks and two abandoned side platforms. The two local tracks, which formerly served the station, are used by the 6 train at all times, <6> trains during weekdays in the peak direction, and the 4 train during late nights. The two express tracks are used by the 4 and 5 trains during daytime hours. The platforms were originally 200 feet (61 m) long, like at other local stations on the original IRT. The southbound platform later became 520 feet (160 m) long. The platforms were curved significantly. The curves made it impossible for all doors on trains to open at the station, when it was in use, and many accidents occurred at the large gaps between trains and the platforms. Wide fare control areas were located at the southern end of the platforms.

As with other stations built as part of the original IRT, the station was constructed using a cut-and-cover method. The tunnel is covered by a U-shaped trough that contains utility pipes and wires. This trough contains a foundation of concrete no less than 4 inches (100 mm) thick. Each former platform consists of 3-inch-thick (7.6 cm) concrete slabs, beneath which are drainage basins. The former platforms contain glazed tile columns spaced every 15 feet (4.6 m). Alternating platform columns had tiles reading "WORTH". Additional columns between the tracks, spaced every 5 feet (1.5 m), support the jack-arched concrete station roofs. Alternating columns between the local and express tracks had black on white signs reading "Worth." There is a 1-inch (25 mm) gap between the trough wall and the platform walls, which are made of 4-inch (100 mm)-thick brick covered over by a tiled finish.

The decorative scheme consisted of blue/green tile tablets, buff tile bands, a green terracotta cornice, and buff terracotta plaques. The mosaic tiles at all original IRT stations were manufactured by the American Encaustic Tile Company, which subcontracted the installations at each station. The decorative work was performed by tile contractor Manhattan Glass Tile Company and terracotta contractor Atlantic Terra Cotta Company. The station walls had shields with the white letter "W". The station's walls and columns have been heavily covered with graffiti.

The station lies beneath the sidewalk on the west side of Foley Square. When the Federal Plaza Building was in the planning stages, it was found that, because of the existence of the station, the building could not extend out to Foley Square. As a result, that structure is set far back from the street, well beyond the station. The building's plaza and fountain lie directly above the station.

== See also ==
- 18th Street station (IRT Lexington Avenue Line)
- 91st Street station (IRT Broadway–Seventh Avenue Line)
