= Broadway–Lafayette Street/Bleecker Street station =

New York City Subway station in Manhattan

Broadway–Lafayette Street/ Bleecker Street
- New York City Subway station complex
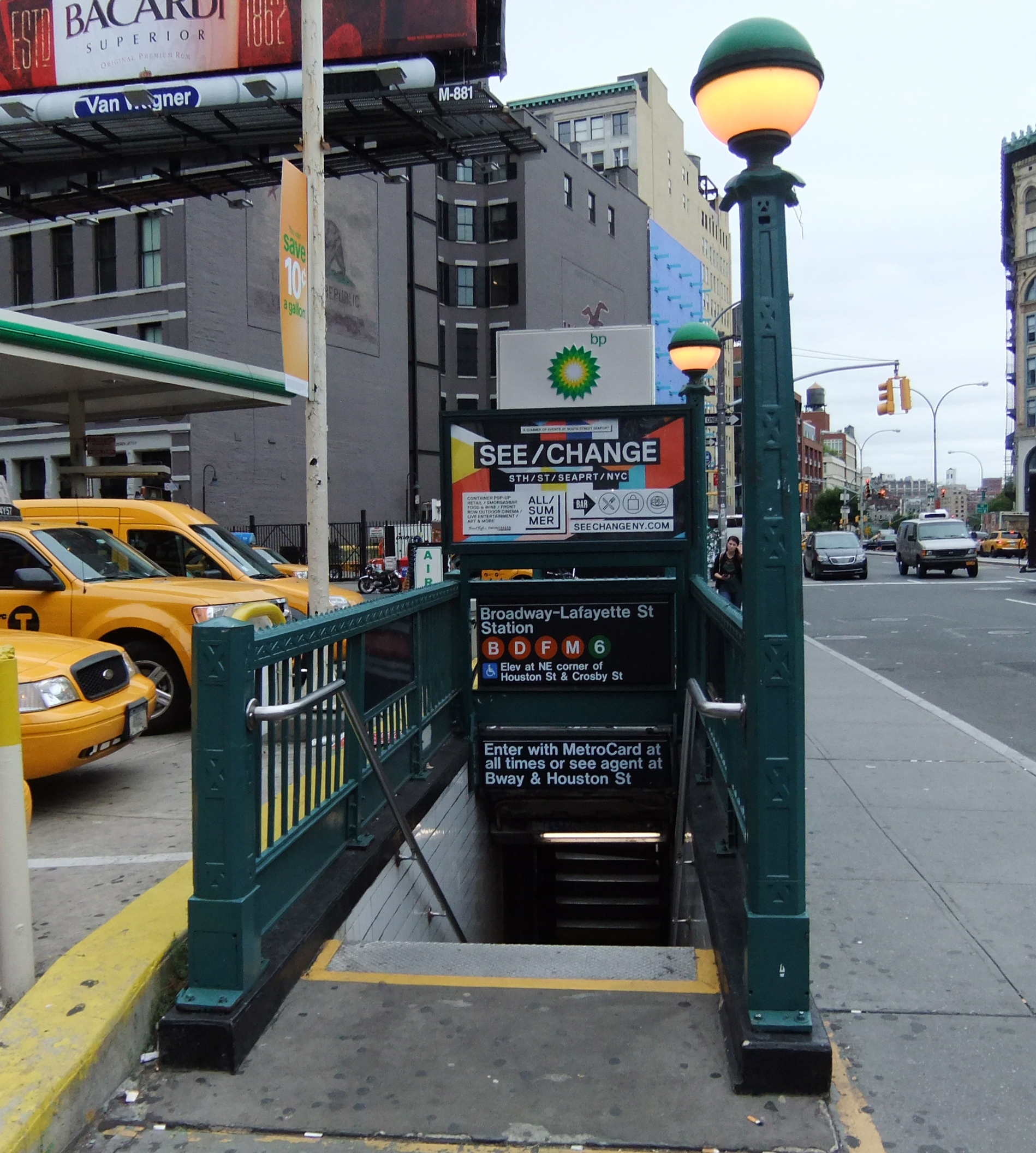
- One of the two street stairs along the south side of East Houston Street between Broadway and Crosby Street

Station statistics
- Address: Houston Street & Lafayette Street; New York, New York
- Borough: Manhattan
- Locale: NoHo, SoHo, Greenwich Village
- Coordinates: 40°43′33″N 73°59′41″W
- Division: A (IRT), B (IND)
- Line: IND Sixth Avenue Line; IRT Lexington Avenue Line
- Services: 4 (late nights); 6 (all times) <6> (weekdays until 8:45 p.m., peak direction); B (weekdays during the day); D (all times); F (all times) <F> (two rush hour trains, peak direction); M (weekdays during the day)
- Transit: NYCT Bus: M1, M21, M55, SIM1, SIM1C, SIM3C, SIM4C, SIM7, SIM9, SIM33, SIM33C, SIM34

Other information
- Opened: May 19, 1957; 69 years ago (IND–southbound IRT); September 25, 2012; 14 years ago (IND–northbound IRT)
- Accessible: Yes

Traffic
- 2025: 10,773,380 ▲8.4%
- Rank: 21 out of 423
Location
Location within New York City Subway
Location within New York City
Location within New York
Street map
Station service legend
Symbol	Description
Stops all times	Stops all times
Stops all times except late nights	Stops all times except late nights
Stops late nights only	Stops late nights only
Stops rush hours in the peak direction only	Stops rush hours in the peak direction only
Stops weekdays during the day	Stops weekdays during the day

The Broadway–Lafayette Street/Bleecker Street station is a New York City Subway station complex in the NoHo neighborhood of Manhattan on the IRT Lexington Avenue Line and the IND Sixth Avenue Line. It is served by the 6, D, and F trains at all times; the B and M trains on weekdays during the day; the 4 train during late nights; the <6> train during weekdays in the peak direction; and the <F> train during rush hours in the peak direction.

The complex comprises two stations, Bleecker Street and Broadway–Lafayette Street. The Bleecker Street station was built for the Interborough Rapid Transit Company (IRT), and was a local station on the city's first subway line, which was approved in 1900. The station opened on October 27, 1904, as one of the original 28 stations of the New York City Subway. The Broadway–Lafayette Street station was built as an express station for the Independent Subway System (IND) and opened on January 1, 1936.

The Bleecker Street station has two side platforms and four tracks; express trains use the inner two tracks to bypass the station. The Broadway–Lafayette Street station has two island platforms and four tracks. The transfer between the downtown IRT platform and the IND platform has been within fare control since May 19, 1957, and the corresponding free transfer from the uptown IRT platform to the rest of the station opened on September 25, 2012. The station complex contains elevators, which make it compliant with the Americans with Disabilities Act of 1990. The original portion of the Bleecker Street station's interior is a New York City designated landmark and listed on the National Register of Historic Places.

== History ==
=== IRT Lexington Avenue Line ===
==== Construction and opening ====
Planning for a subway line in New York City dates to 1864. However, development of what would become the city's first subway line did not start until 1894, when the New York State Legislature passed the Rapid Transit Act. The subway plans were drawn up by a team of engineers led by William Barclay Parsons, the Rapid Transit Commission's chief engineer. It called for a subway line from New York City Hall in lower Manhattan to the Upper West Side, where two branches would lead north into the Bronx. A plan was formally adopted in 1897, and all legal conflicts over the route alignment were resolved near the end of 1899. The Rapid Transit Construction Company, organized by John B. McDonald and funded by August Belmont Jr., signed the initial Contract 1 with the Rapid Transit Commission in February 1900, in which it would construct the subway and maintain a 50-year operating lease from the opening of the line. In 1901, the firm of Heins & LaFarge was hired to design the underground stations. Belmont incorporated the Interborough Rapid Transit Company (IRT) in April 1902 to operate the subway.

The Bleecker Street station was constructed as part of the route segment from Chambers Street to Great Jones Street. Construction on this section of the line began on July 10, 1900, and was awarded to Degnon-McLean Contracting Company. In the vicinity of the Bleecker Street station, the subway was to run under Lafayette Street, a new thoroughfare constructed between 1897 and 1905. This involved widening, connecting, and renaming two formerly unconnected streets: Elm Street, which ran south of Houston Street, and Lafayette Place, which ran north of Great Jones Street to an intersection with Astor Place. The southward extension of Lafayette Street and the construction of the subway required the demolition or underpinning of several buildings in the street's path. This resulted in the creation of narrow land lots on either side of Lafayette Street between Houston and Great Jones Streets, an area that included the Bleecker Street station's site. Even after the subway was completed, many of the narrow lots on Lafayette Street remained undeveloped for decades.

During the station's construction in 1903, a portion of the ceiling collapsed, reportedly because of poor workmanship. By late 1903, the subway was nearly complete, but the IRT Powerhouse and the system's electrical substations were still under construction, delaying the system's opening. Except for the collapsed section of the ceiling, the station itself was finished by January 1904. The Bleecker Street station opened on October 27, 1904, as one of the original 28 stations of the New York City Subway from City Hall to 145th Street on the Broadway–Seventh Avenue Line. The opening of the first subway line, and particularly the Bleecker Street station, helped contribute to more development in the East Village, which at the time was already densely populated.

==== 1900s to 1930s ====
Shortly after the station opened, IRT workers allowed advertisers to place more than 40 advertisements on the walls, even though the Rapid Transit Commission had banned the IRT from displaying ads in stations. The IRT proposed modifying the ads so they harmonized with the station's architecture, but the Municipal Art Society wanted the ads to be taken down because they overlapped with the name tablets on the walls. Legal disputes over the advertisements continued until 1907, when a New York Supreme Court judge ruled that the IRT could display advertising at stations.

To address overcrowding, in 1909, the New York Public Service Commission proposed lengthening the platforms at stations along the original IRT subway. As part of a modification to the IRT's construction contracts made on January 18, 1910, the company was to lengthen station platforms to accommodate ten-car express and six-car local trains. In addition to $1.5 million (equivalent to $51.8 million in 2025) spent on platform lengthening, $500,000 (equivalent to $17.3 million in 2025) was spent on building additional entrances and exits. It was anticipated that these improvements would increase capacity by 25 percent. The Bleecker Street station's northbound platform was extended north by 30 feet (9.1 m), while the southbound platform was extended south by 25 feet (7.6 m). Six-car local trains began operating in October 1910.

In December 1922, the Transit Commission approved a $3 million project to lengthen platforms at 14 local stations along the original IRT line, including Bleecker Street and seven other stations on the Lexington Avenue Line. Platform lengths at these stations would be increased from 225 to 436 feet (69 to 133 m). The commission postponed the platform-lengthening project in September 1923, at which point the cost had risen to $5.6 million. The commission again considered lengthening the IRT platforms at Bleecker Street in December 1927. At the end of the month, the Transit Commission requested that the IRT create plans to lengthen the platforms at Bleecker Street and three other Lexington Avenue Line stations to 480 feet (150 m). The northbound platform at Bleecker Street needed to be lengthened by 251 feet (77 m), while the southbound platform needed to be lengthened 255 feet (78 m); both platforms could be extended to either the north or south. The federal government placed an injunction against the commission's platform-lengthening decree, which remained in place for over a year. By 1929, the New York City Board of Transportation had not yet drawn up plans for the Bleecker Street station.

==== 1940s to 2000s ====
The city government took over the IRT's operations on June 12, 1940. The New York City Board of Transportation issued a $1.97 million contract in early 1947 to extend the southbound IRT platforms at Bleecker Street and Spring Street to fit ten-car trains. The work was finished the next year.

In late 1959, contracts were awarded to extend the platforms at Bowling Green, Wall Street, Fulton Street, Canal Street, Spring Street, Bleecker Street, Astor Place, Grand Central–42nd Street, 86th Street, and 125th Street to 525 feet (160 m). In April 1960, work began on a $3,509,000 project (equivalent to $38.2 million in 2025) to lengthen platforms at seven IRT Lexington Avenue Line stations to accommodate ten-car trains. The northbound platforms at Canal Street, Spring Street, Bleecker Street, and Astor Place were lengthened from 225 to 525 feet (69 to 160 m); the platform extensions at these stations opened on February 19, 1962.

In 1979, the New York City Landmarks Preservation Commission designated the space within the boundaries of the original Bleecker Street station, excluding expansions made after 1904, as a city landmark. The station was designated along with eleven others on the original IRT. The IRT station was renovated in the late 1980s, but the renovation was delayed by one year because the project had to be redesigned to conform to landmark regulations. High entry-exit turnstiles were added at the Bleecker Street entrance to the southbound platform in 1998. The previous turnstiles at that entrance, which had dated from the 1930s, often malfunctioned and did not allow passengers to enter. The Bleecker Street station's original interiors were listed on the National Register of Historic Places in 2004.

=== IND Sixth Avenue Line ===
==== Construction and opening ====
New York City mayor John Francis Hylan's original plans for the Independent Subway System (IND), proposed in 1922, included building over 100 miles (160 km) of new lines and taking over nearly 100 miles (160 km) of existing lines, which would compete with the IRT and the Brooklyn–Manhattan Transit Corporation (BMT), the two major subway operators of the time. The IND Sixth Avenue Line was designed to replace the elevated IRT Sixth Avenue Line. The first portion of the line to be constructed was then known as the Houston–Essex Street Line, which ran under Houston, Essex, and Rutgers Streets. The contract for the line was awarded to Corson Construction in January 1929, and construction of this section officially started in May 1929.

In 1930, the New York City Board of Transportation (BOT) identified the locations of 104 stations to be built in the IND system. Under this plan, there would have been an express station under Houston Street between Broadway and Lafayette Street. The same year, as part of the Broadway–Lafayette Street station's construction, the Emigrant Industrial Savings Bank gave the city permission to build and operate an entrance to the station within the bank's building at the northwest corner of Houston Street and Broadway. The BOT awarded a $371.113 contract in July 1932 for the installation of finishes at the Broadway–Lafayette Street station and three others along the Houston–Essex Streets Line. In early 1934, the BOT began looking to rent out a vacant lot at the intersection of Lafayette and Houston Streets, which had been cleared for the construction of the subway. That July, the BOT solicited bids for the installation of signals and switches on the Houston–Essex Street Line; the contract had been scheduled for January 1933 but was delayed eighteen months because the city did not have enough money.

The Broadway–Lafayette Street station opened on January 1, 1936, as one of the first four stations on the Houston–Essex Street Line, the first part of the Sixth Avenue Line. At the time of the station's opening, some of the columns had not been finished. The two local tracks split from a junction with the Eighth Avenue Line south of West Fourth Street–Washington Square, running east under Houston Street and south under Essex Street to a temporary terminal at East Broadway.

==== 1940s to 1990s ====
By the early 1990s, many homeless people were sheltered within the Broadway–Lafayette Street station and the tunnels near it. Newsday wrote in 1992: "This one subway station has enough hidden corners, secret passages, dead-end mezzanines and staircases to nowhere to accommodate half the homeless population of New York." The high homeless population at the Broadway–Lafayette Street station, and at the adjacent Second Avenue station, was attributed to their proximity to the rundown Bowery neighborhood. The Metropolitan Transportation Authority (MTA), which operated the subway system, removed several benches from the station in 1990 to dissuade homeless people from staying there. The benches were reinstalled after homeless advocates objected. The MTA also removed two of the station's high entry-exit turnstiles in 1992 to increase passenger flow. In April 1993, the New York State Legislature agreed to give the MTA $9.6 billion for capital improvements. Some of the funds would be used to renovate nearly one hundred New York City Subway stations, including Broadway–Lafayette Street.

=== Consolidation into single complex ===
==== Southbound transfer ====
A free transfer passageway from the southbound IRT platform to the IND platform opened on May 19, 1957, after the IRT station's platforms had been lengthened to fit ten-car trains. This one-way transfer was purely coincidental and was not intended in the original construction. The construction of a connection from the northbound platform would have required more extensive construction, including knocking down support walls and digging a tunnel. The northbound platform was extended two car lengths to the north because it was easier to do and cost less. As a result, a free transfer was not available to the northbound platform. Passengers had to exit the IND station, walk one block north to Bleecker Street, and pay an additional fare.

For several decades, the Bleecker Street and Broadway–Lafayette Street stations were the only place in the system where a free transfer was possible only in one direction. As a result, riders heading to or from the northbound IRT had to transfer at other stations, such as the Atlantic Avenue–Pacific Street station and the Jay Street–Lawrence Street station in Brooklyn. Most passengers transferring between the IND and the uptown IRT platform continued to pay an additional fare, except for holders of unlimited-ride MetroCards, after that option was introduced in the 1990s. According to transit historian Clifton Hood, the lack of a northbound transfer was a "pretty late holdover" from the era prior to the unification of the city's three subway systems in 1940.

==== Northbound transfer ====
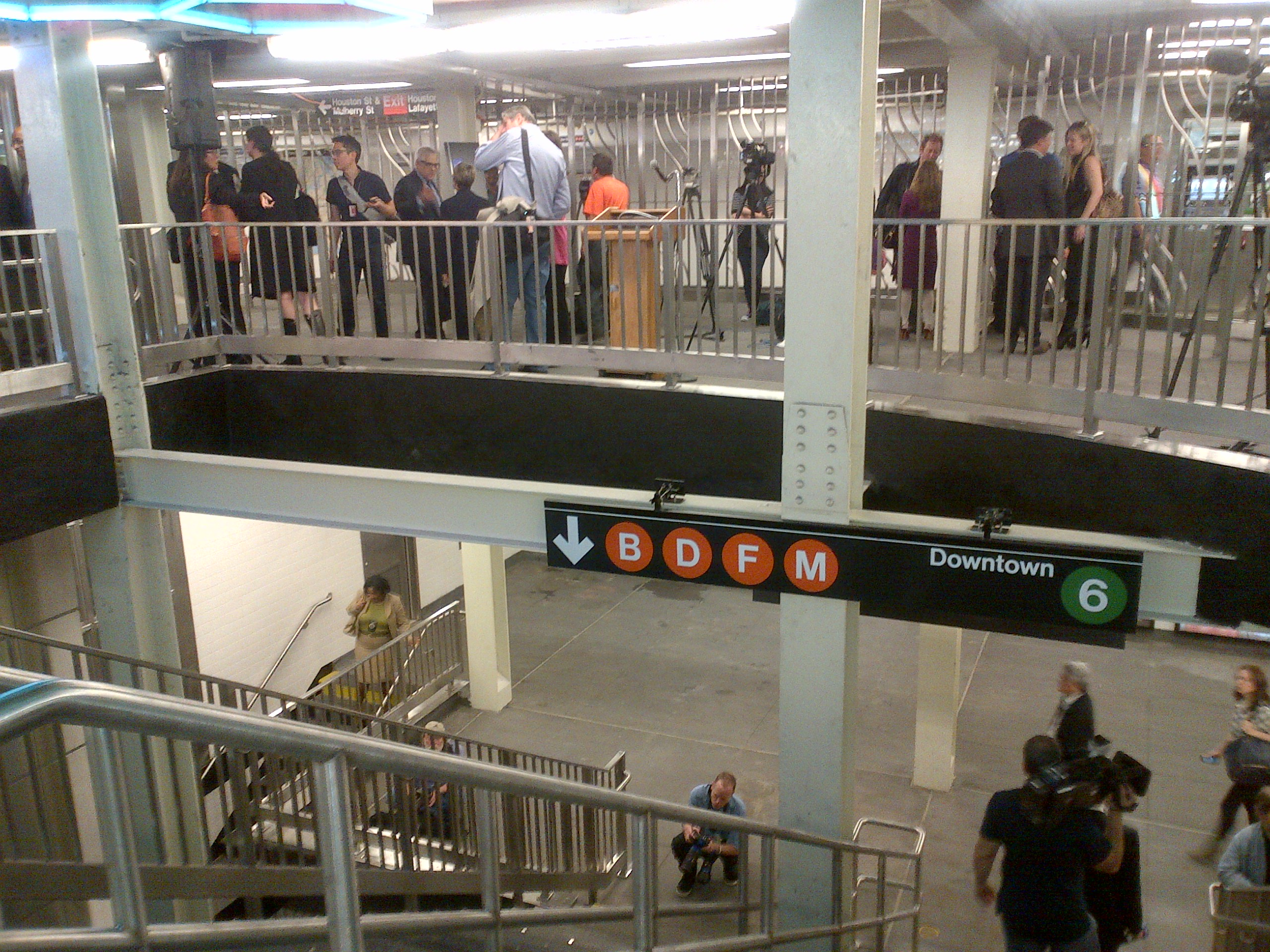
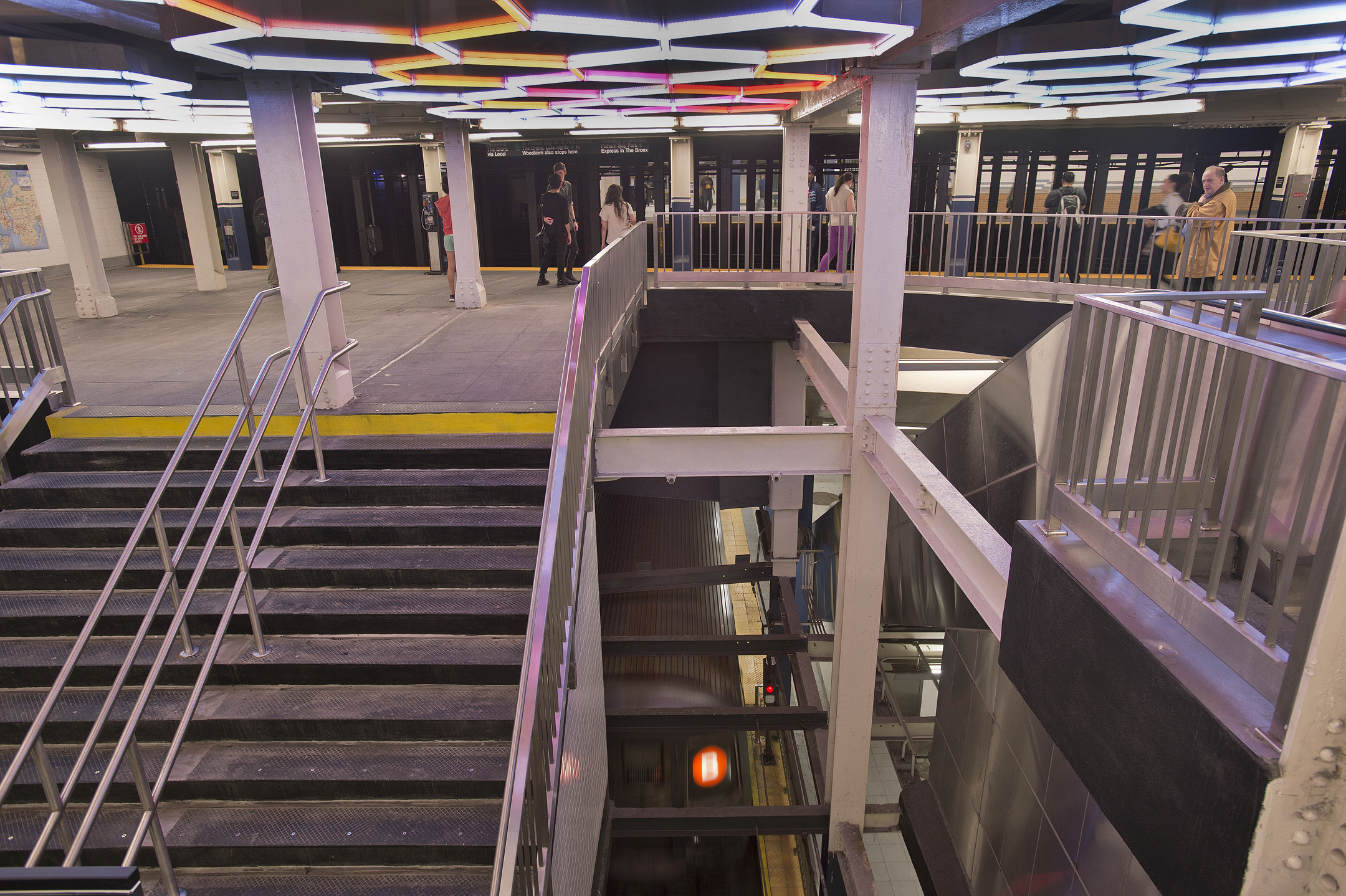
The transfer to the northbound IRT platform; the IND platforms are below

A transfer between the IND platforms and the uptown IRT platform had been planned since 1989, when the project was included in the MTA's third capital program. Construction on the transfer would have started in 1992 pending the approval of the program by the State Legislature. The MTA estimated that 15,000 daily passengers would use the free transfer. The MTA contemplated providing a free transfer between the IND and northbound IRT platforms during the late 1990s. This would have alleviated congestion caused by the closure of the Manhattan Bridge's northern pair of subway tracks, which resulted in numerous service changes at the IND station. By 1998, this transfer was no longer being planned.

Further progress on the IND/IRT transfer stalled until 2005, when the MTA announced that it would renovate the complex in its 2005–2009 capital program. The project was to cost $50 million, including $9.2 million for the IRT platforms' renovation, $8.9 million for ADA-accessible elevators, and $31.9 million for a free transfer to the uptown IRT platform. An escalator connected the uptown platform of the Broadway-Lafayette Street station with a new transfer mezzanine that connected riders to the uptown platform of the Bleecker Street station. In addition, elevators were installed to connect the various platforms of the IND station, and those of Bleecker Street. The transfer contained new elevators and escalators to the IND station below. The street-level elevator accesses the southbound IRT platform directly, while four other elevators in the station connect each IND platform with each IRT platform.

On March 26, 2012, the uptown platform was shifted south to the newly constructed extension, and the 1950s northern extension closed at the same time. At the time, the MTA stated that the transfer to the uptown Bleecker Street platform would be completed at the end of June. The uptown transfer did not fully open until September 25, 2012. The overall cost of the rehabilitation project had climbed to $127 million. The MTA estimated that the free transfer would benefit 30,000 riders daily; by then, the complex had 11.6 million passengers annually. The New York Daily News wrote: "Thus will be completed the grand project, begun 72 years ago under Mayor Fiorello LaGuardia, of unifying the subways, the great unifier of New York."

=== Service history ===
==== IRT station ====
After the first subway line was completed in 1908, the station was served by local trains along both the West Side (now the Broadway–Seventh Avenue Line to Van Cortlandt Park–242nd Street) and East Side (now the Lenox Avenue Line). West Side local trains had their southern terminus at City Hall during rush hours and South Ferry at other times, and had their northern terminus at 242nd Street. East Side local trains ran from City Hall to Lenox Avenue (145th Street). The Lexington Avenue Line opened north of Grand Central–42nd Street in 1918, and the original line was divided into an H-shaped system. All local trains were sent via the Lexington Avenue Line, running along the Pelham Line in the Bronx. The IRT routes were given numbered designations in 1948 with the introduction of "R-type" rolling stock, which contained rollsigns with numbered designations for each service. The Lexington Avenue–Pelham local became known as the 6.

==== IND station ====
When the IND station opened, it was served by E local trains via the Eighth Avenue Line to its southern terminus, Church Avenue in Brooklyn. There was no express service at the Broadway–Lafayette Street station, since the tracks ended abruptly at West Fourth Street–Washington Square to the north and Second Avenue to the east. When further sections of the Sixth Avenue Line opened on December 15, 1940, the F train began running local on the Sixth Avenue Line to Brooklyn, while the E train's southern terminus was truncated to the Broadway–Lafayette Street station. The CC Eighth Avenue local service, which only ran during rush hours, began terminating at Broadway–Lafayette Street on weekdays in 1949. Weekday CC service returned to its previous terminal at Hudson Terminal in 1954.

On November 26, 1967, the first part of the Chrystie Street Connection opened, connecting the IND station's express tracks south of the Broadway–Lafayette Street station to the Grand Street station and the northern pair of tracks on the Manhattan Bridge. The express tracks started to be used by the B and D trains. The portion of the Chrystie Street Connection connecting the IND station's local tracks with the Williamsburg Bridge opened on July 1, 1968, and was used by the KK train until that route was discontinued in 1976.

When the Manhattan Bridge's north tracks were closed for repairs between 1986 and 1988, the Sixth Avenue Shuttle stopped at the station, running from 57th Street to Grand Street. The Q train started running along the Sixth Avenue Line's express tracks in 1988 and continued to operate on the line until 2001. The Grand Street Shuttle operated from Broadway–Lafayette Street to Grand Street during 1995, and again between July 2001 and 2004, when the Manhattan Bridge's north tracks were again closed. The V train, which used the Sixth Avenue Line's local tracks, began serving the station in December 2001. The V train was discontinued in 2010 and replaced by the M train, which began using the Williamsburg Bridge connection east of the station.

== Station layout ==
A passageway connects the downtown IRT platform under Lafayette Street and the mezzanine at Broadway. There is a lower mezzanine for the IND underneath the IRT platforms and above the IND platforms.

=== Art ===
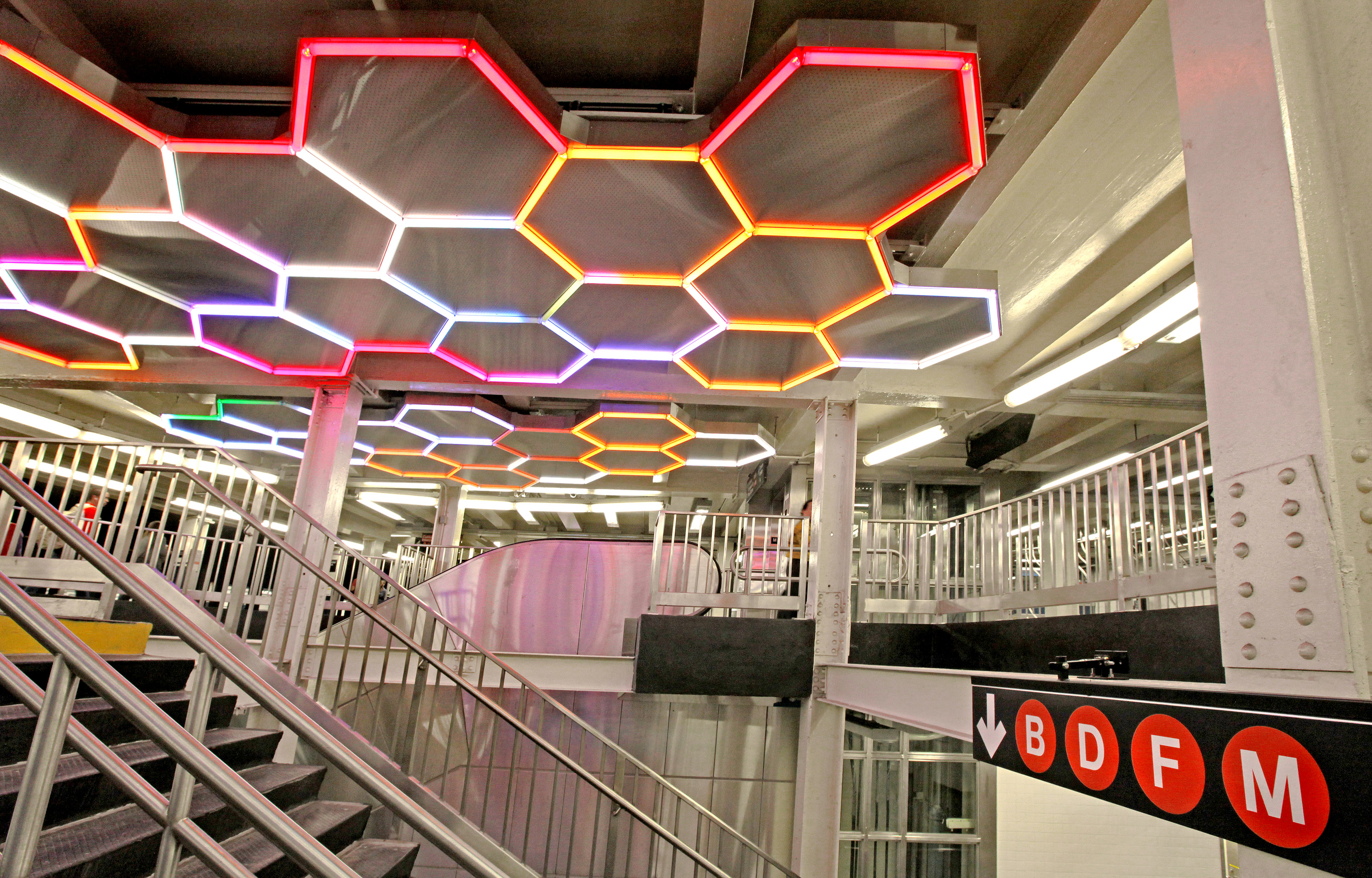
The Hive artwork by Leo Villareal

The 1998 artwork in the IND station is called Signal by Mel Chin. It features stainless steel and glass sculptures with lights on the lower mezzanine and ceramic tiles on the walls of the platforms and mezzanines. Along the mezzanine, there are conical shapes at the bases of several columns, which were meant to depict campfires. The work was created in collaboration with Peter Jemison, a Seneca Native American. Jemison created a mosaic depicting figures from the Six Nations of the Haudenosanee confederacy.

As part of the MTA Arts & Design program, Leo Villareal created a light installation called Hive in 2012. It is located at the newest section of the uptown IRT platform in the mezzanine providing the transfer to the IND station. The work consists of hexagonal lights that can change color. The shapes used in the installation was inspired by shapes created by mathematician John Horton Conway. According to Sandra Bloodworth of MTA Arts & Design, the artwork was intended to help passengers navigate the complex; she stated in 2016 that the installation "really resonates with the activity of the station, the people waiting on the platform, this ever-changing lighting artwork".

=== Exits ===
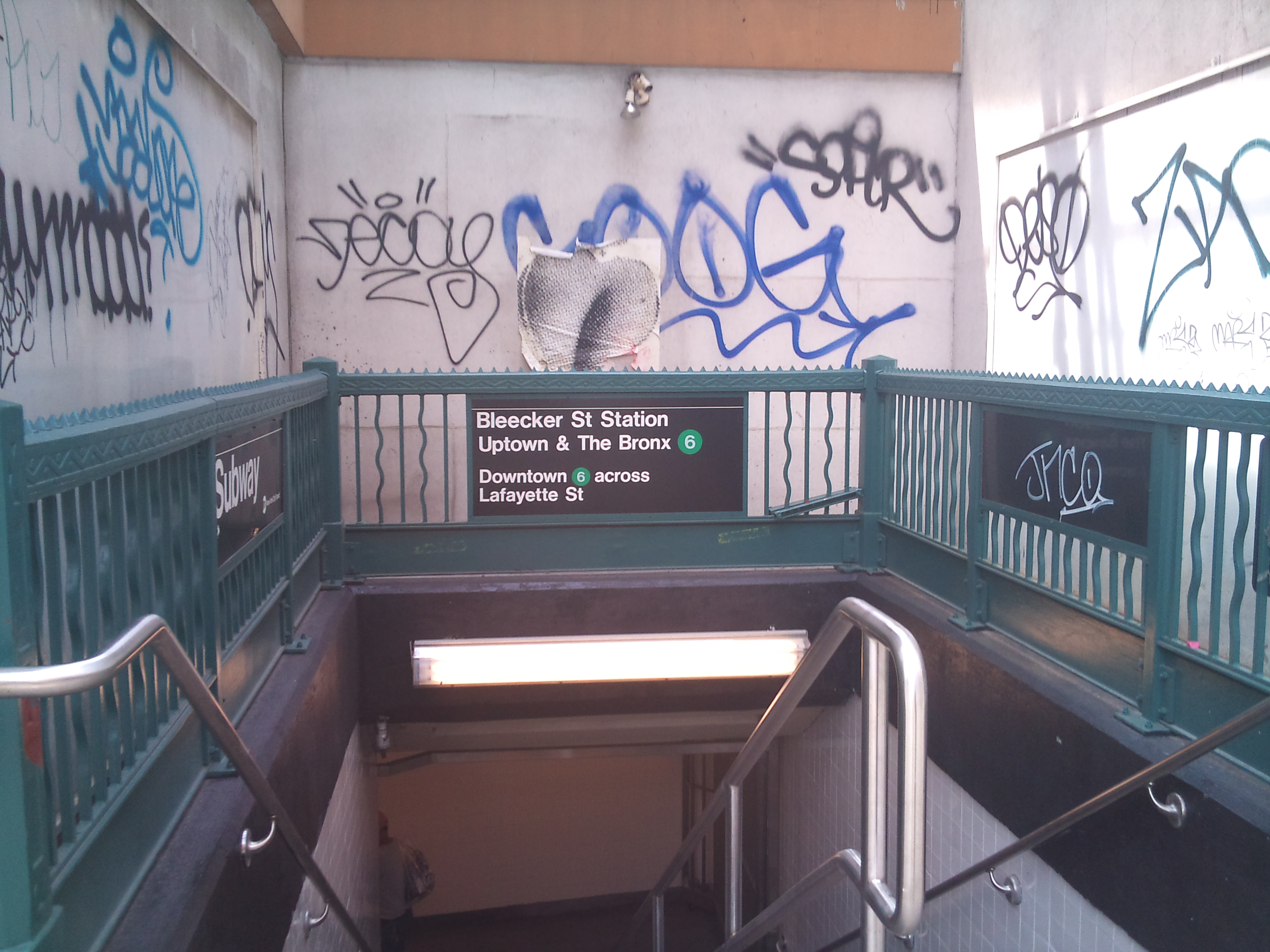
An entrance to the northbound IRT platform in 2010, before the opening of the free transfer

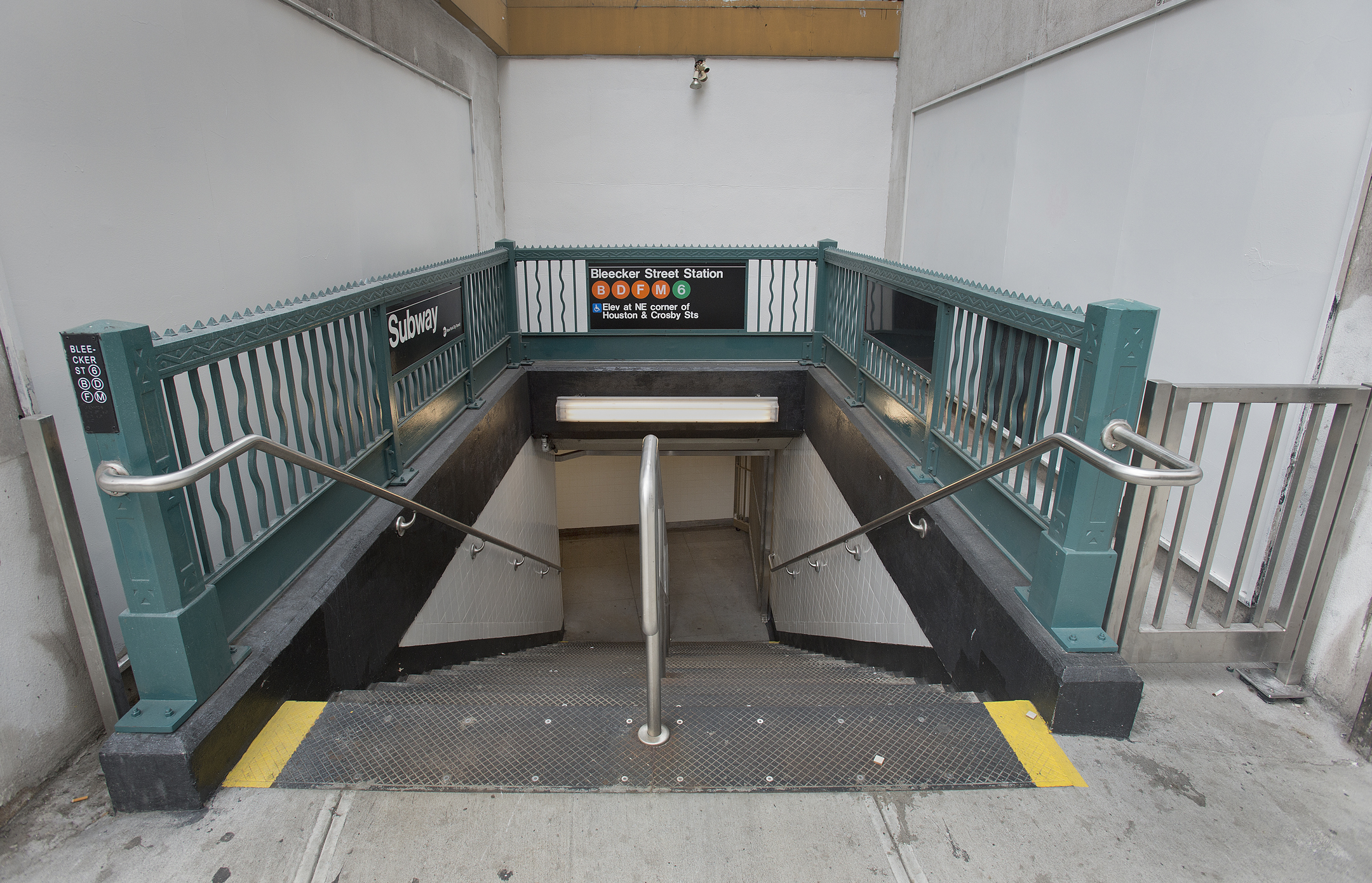
The same entrance after the opening of the free transfer

The station has a total of 12 staircase entrances and one elevator entrance. They are clustered in three locations: the intersection of Broadway and Houston Street, the intersection of Lafayette and Houston Streets, and the intersection of Lafayette and Bleecker Streets, The exits at Houston Street primarily serve the IND platforms while the exits at Lafayette Street primarily serve the IRT platforms. The northbound IRT platform's exits are on the eastern side of Lafayette Street while the southbound platform's exits are on the western side.

There are two stairs at Broadway and Houston Street, one at either eastern corner. The southeastern one is built inside a building. It leads to the full-time entrance to the IND station, above the center of that station, which contains a turnstile bank and token booth. There are closed staircases from the extreme western ends of both platforms that lead to a western mezzanine with exits to the west side of Broadway and Houston Street.

The upper IND mezzanine has two fare control areas that are shared with the southbound IRT platform. A set of turnstiles on the south side leads to two staircases at the southwest corner of Lafayette and Houston Streets. Another set of turnstiles on the north side leads to a stair and an elevator on the northwest corner of Lafayette and Houston Streets. The extreme east end of the IND station contains stairs and escalators to the eastern mezzanine, which is shared with the northbound IRT platform. This mezzanine contains two stairs, one to each eastern corner of Houston and Lafayette Streets.

There are five stairs near Lafayette and Bleecker Streets. One stair each goes to the northwestern and southwestern corners of Lafayette and Bleecker Streets, and serve the southbound IRT platform. One stair each goes to the northeastern, southwestern, and southeastern corners of Mulberry and Bleecker Streets, and serve the northbound IRT platform.

== IRT Lexington Avenue Line platforms ==
Bleecker Street
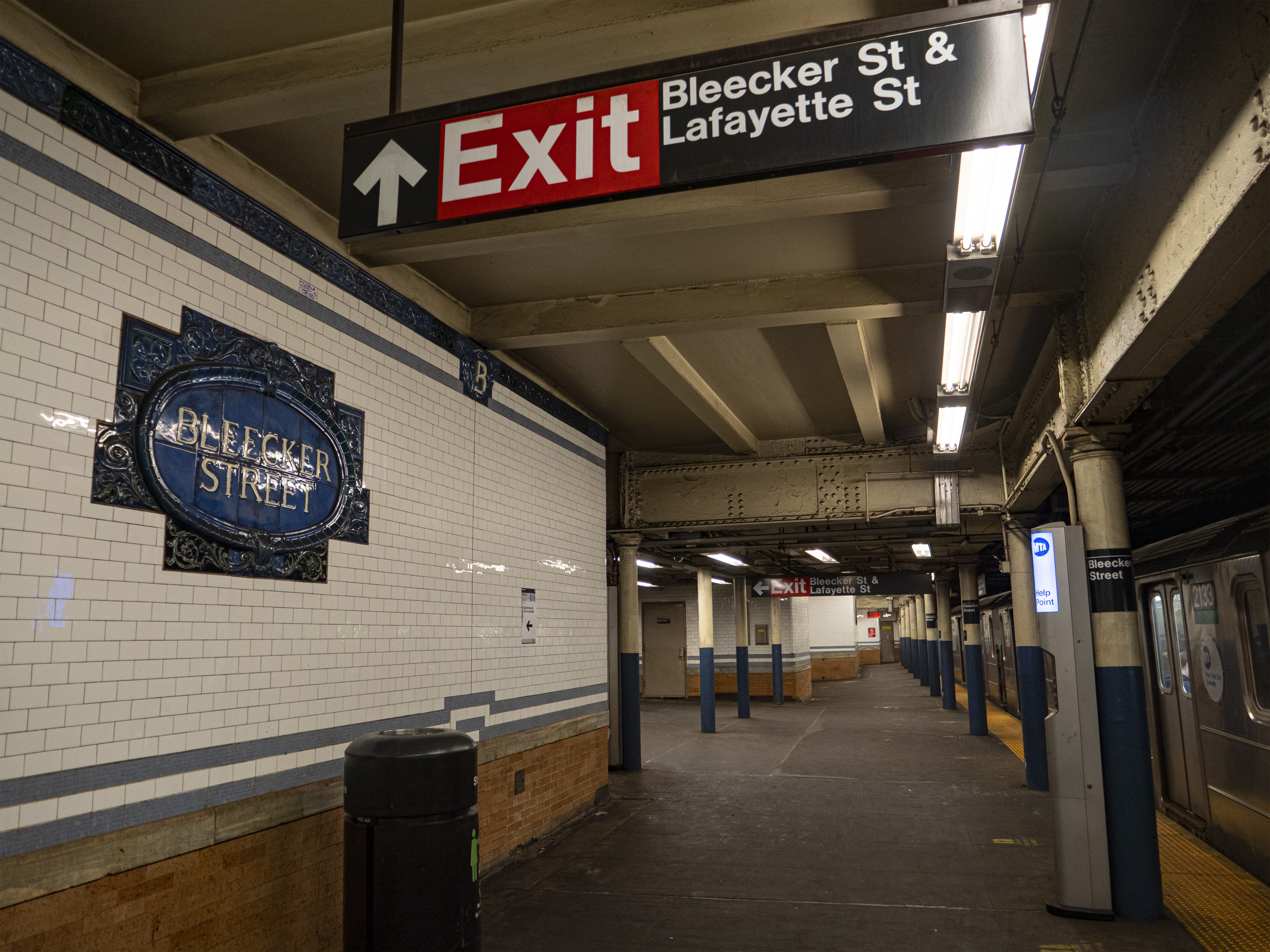
- View of southbound platform, with an R62A 6 train arriving at the station

Station statistics
- Division: A (IRT)
- Line: IRT Lexington Avenue Line
- Services: 4 (late nights); 6 (all times) <6> (weekdays until 8:45 p.m., peak direction)
- Structure: Underground
- Platforms: 2 side platforms
- Tracks: 4

Other information
- Opened: October 27, 1904; 122 years ago
- Accessible: Yes
Services
Preceding station	New York City Subway	Following station
Astor Place 4 6 <6> toward Pelham Bay Park	Local	Spring Street 4 6 <6> toward Brooklyn Bridge–City Hall
does not stop here
Track layout
Station service legend
Symbol	Description
Stops all times	Stops all times
Stops all times except late nights	Stops all times except late nights
Stops late nights only	Stops late nights only
Stops rush hours in the peak direction only	Stops rush hours in the peak direction only
- Bleecker Street Subway Station (IRT)
- U.S. National Register of Historic Places
- New York State Register of Historic Places
- New York City Landmark
- MPS: New York City Subway System MPS
- NRHP reference No.: 04001012
- NYSRHP No.: 06101.015016
- NYCL No.: 1096

Significant dates
- Added to NRHP: September 17, 2004
- Designated NYSRHP: July 20, 2004
- Designated NYCL: October 23, 1979

The Bleecker Street station is a local station on the IRT Lexington Avenue Line with four tracks and two side platforms. The 6 stops here at all times, rush-hour and midday <6> trains stop here in the peak direction; and the 4 stops here during late nights. The two express tracks are used by the 4 and 5 trains during daytime hours. The station is between Astor Place to the north and Spring Street to the south. The platforms were originally 200 feet (61 m) long, like at other local stations on the original IRT, but as a result of the 1959 platform extensions, became 525 feet (160 m) long. The platform extensions were originally at the front ends of the original platforms: the southbound platform was extended southward and the northbound platform was extended northward. After the 2012 renovation, the northbound platform was extended to the south, and the northern extension of that platform was closed. Fixed platform barriers, which are intended to prevent commuters falling to the tracks, are positioned near the platform edges.

=== Design ===
As with other stations built as part of the original IRT, the station was constructed using a cut-and-cover method. The tunnel is covered by a U-shaped trough that contains utility pipes and wires. This trough contains a foundation of concrete no less than 4 inches (100 mm) thick. Each platform consists of 3-inch-thick (7.6 cm) concrete slabs, beneath which are drainage basins. The original platforms contain circular, cast-iron Tuscan-style columns spaced every 15 feet (4.6 m), while the platform extensions contain I-beam columns. Additional columns between the tracks, spaced every 5 feet (1.5 m), support the jack-arched concrete station roofs. The cast-iron columns were originally painted yellow. The ceiling height varies based on whether there are utilities in the ceiling; the areas without utilities is about 15 feet (4.6 m) above platform level. There is a 1-inch (25 mm) gap between the trough wall and the platform walls, which are made of 4-inch (100 mm)-thick brick covered over by a tiled finish.

The fare control areas are at platform level. The crossunder between the platforms is via the IND station. The walls along the platforms near the fare control areas consist of a brick wainscoting on the lowest part of the wall, with bronze air vents along the wainscoting, and white glass tiles above. Bands of blue mosaic tiles run above the wainscoting. A cornice with foliate motifs runs above each wall. Faience plaques containing the letter "B" are placed at 15-foot (4.6 m) intervals. The walls flare outward slightly near the original entrances at Bleecker Street, where there are large oval tablets with the white letters "Bleecker Street" on a blue frame. There were originally four such tablets on each platform, or eight total. The mosaic tiles at all original IRT stations were manufactured by the American Encaustic Tile Company, which subcontracted the installations at each station. The decorative work was performed by faience contractor Grueby Faience Company.

The ceilings of the original platforms and fare control areas contain plaster molding. Originally, the ceiling was painted white and yellow. Each platform also had three ticket windows, placed between the stairways leading to the street. The northbound platform contains doorways that formerly led to men's and women's restrooms, with corresponding marble lintels.

The northern platform extension of the northbound platform, now walled off, had green tiles and a darker green trim line with "BLEECKER ST" written on it in black sans serif font at regular intervals. These tiles were installed during the late 1950s renovation. The platform extension of the southbound platform had similar tiles, which were removed in the 2012 extension.

=== Gallery ===
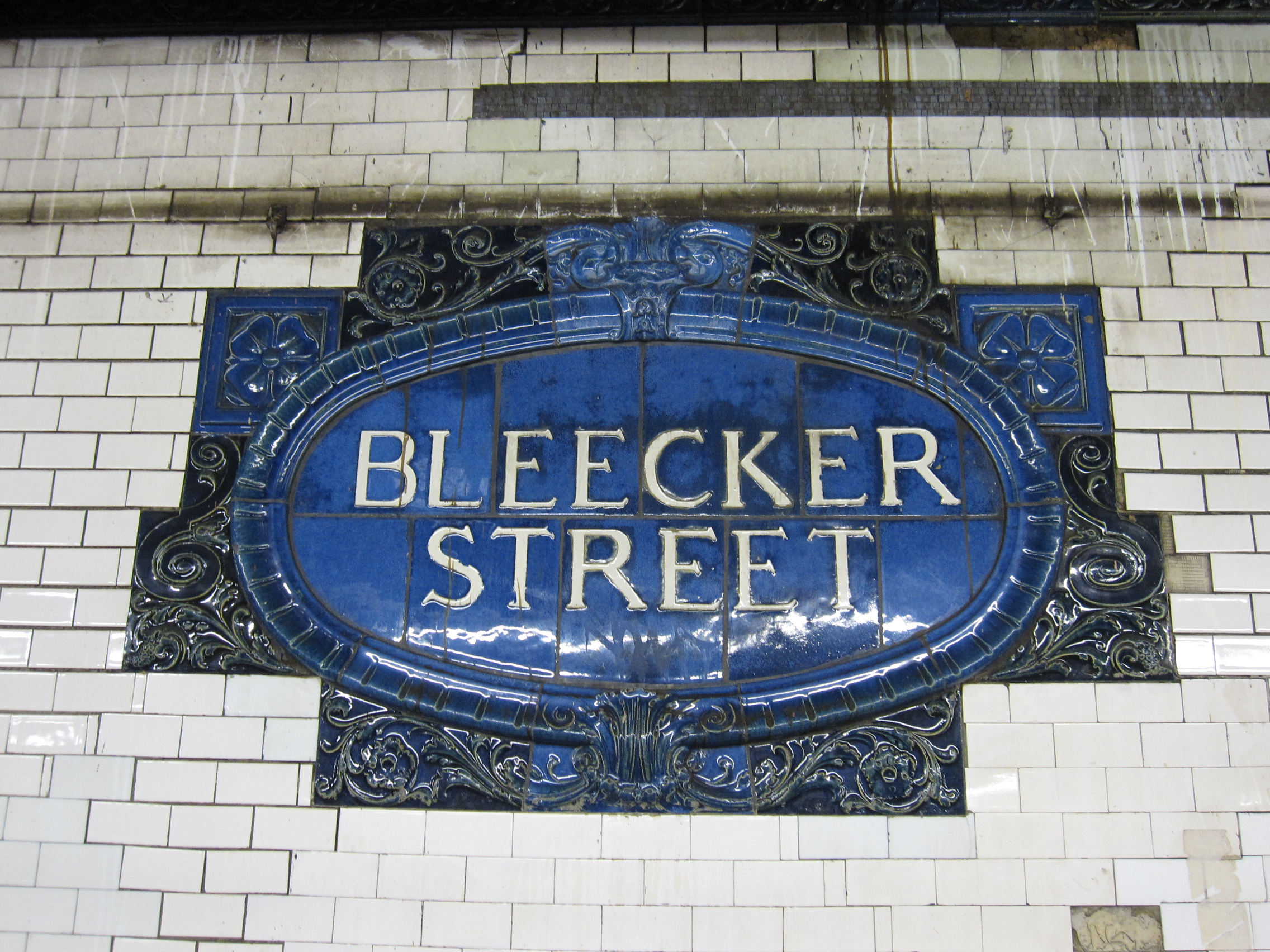
Faience name tablet, Heins & LaFarge/Grueby Faience Company, from 1904

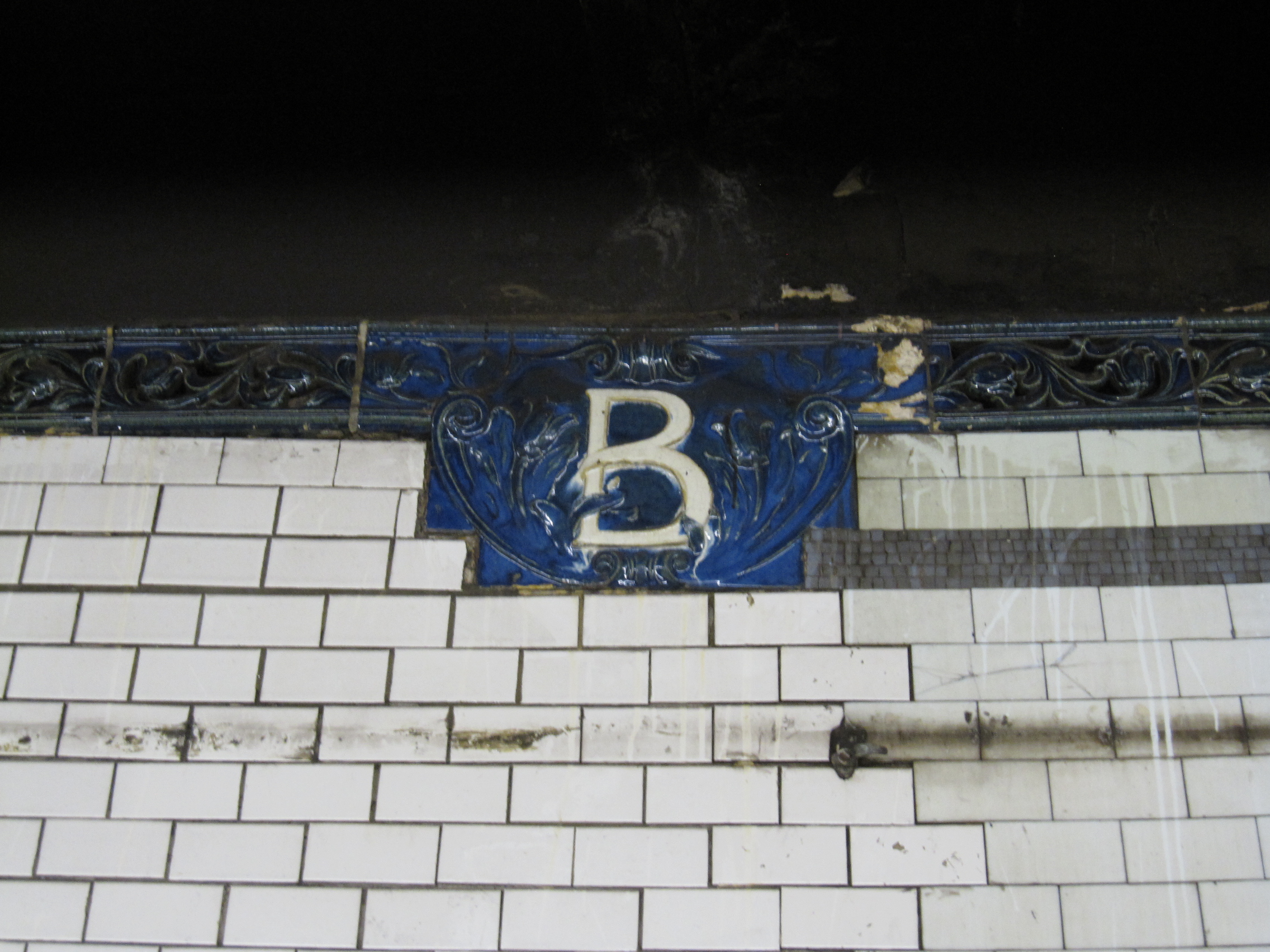
Original cartouche

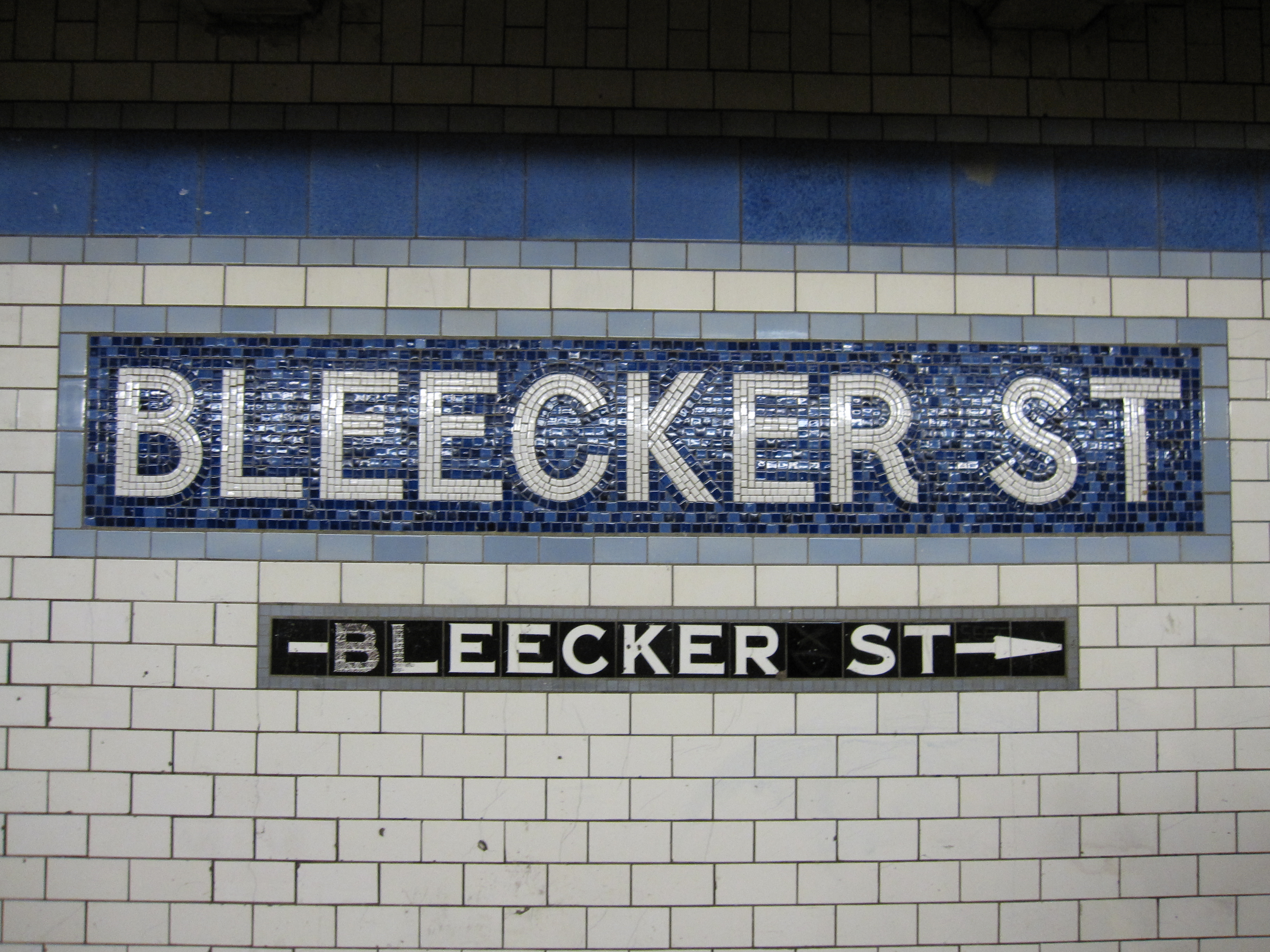
Pre-renovation Mosaic station tablets by Vickers

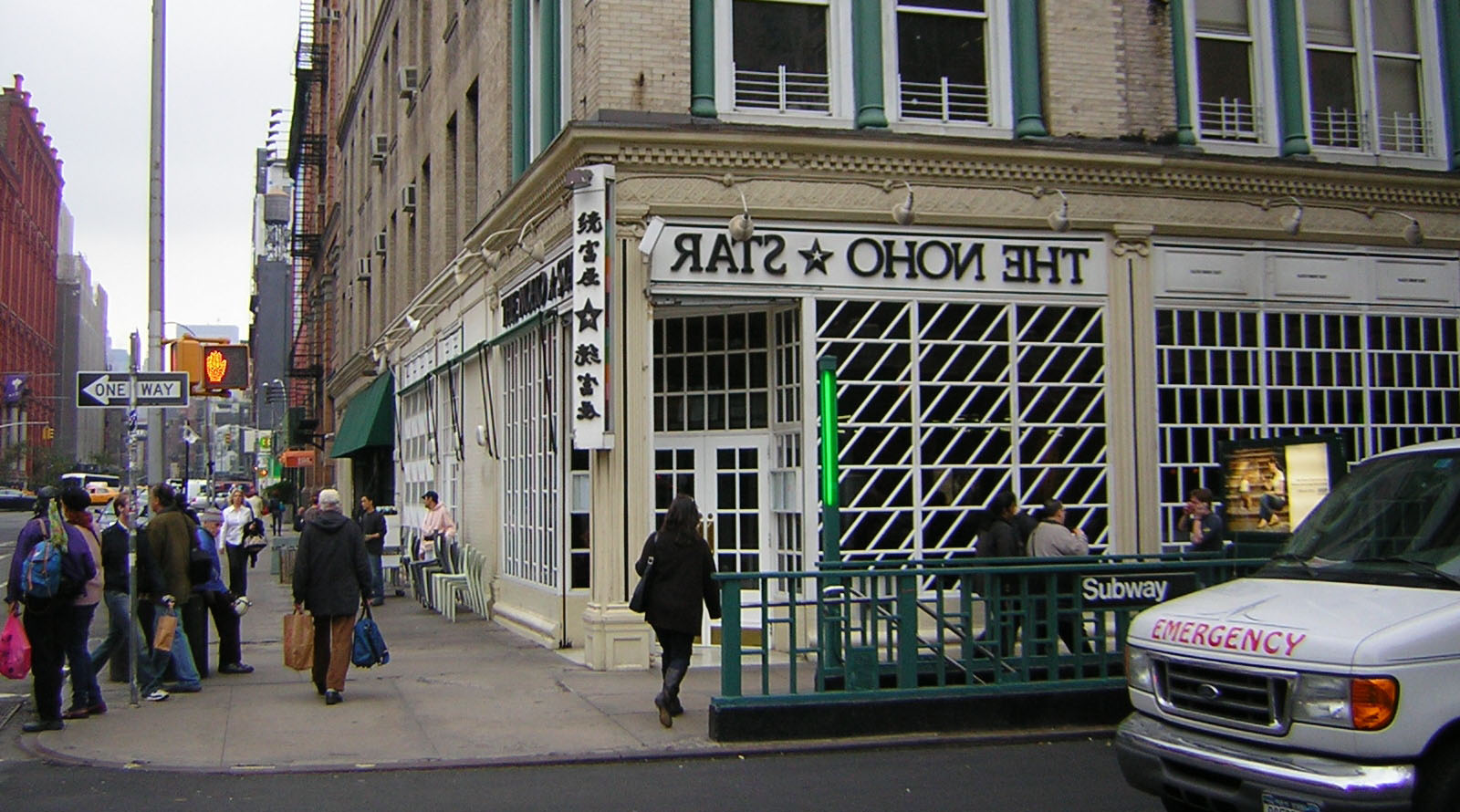
Southbound stairway at street

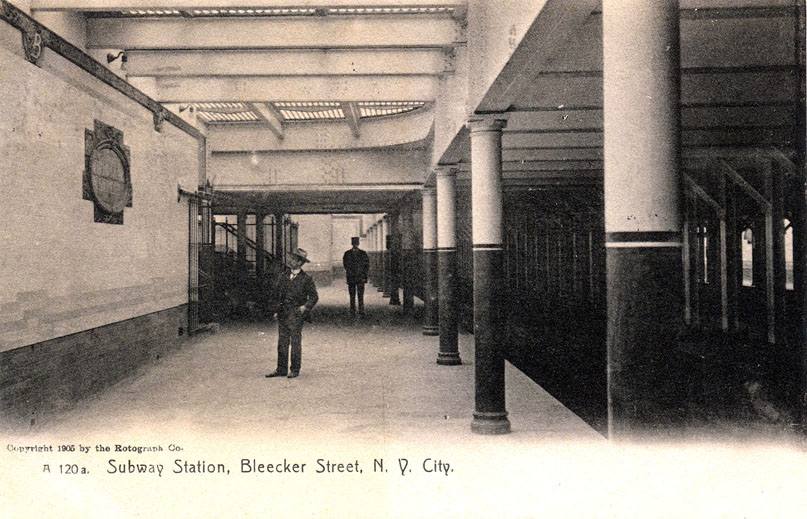
The station used to have skylights to let in natural light (1905)

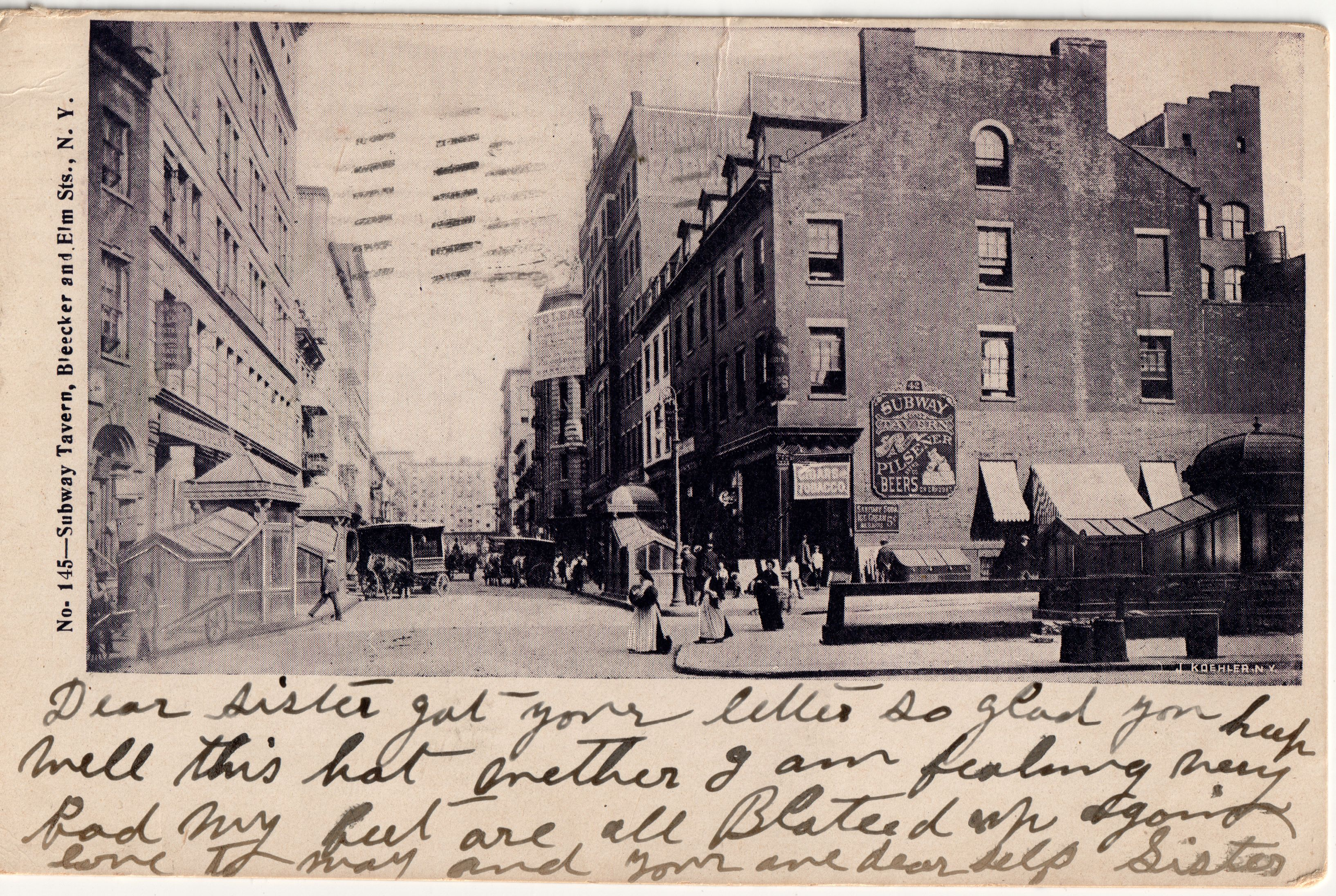
Entrance around 1907 with nearby Subway Tavern

== IND Sixth Avenue Line platforms ==
Broadway–Lafayette Street
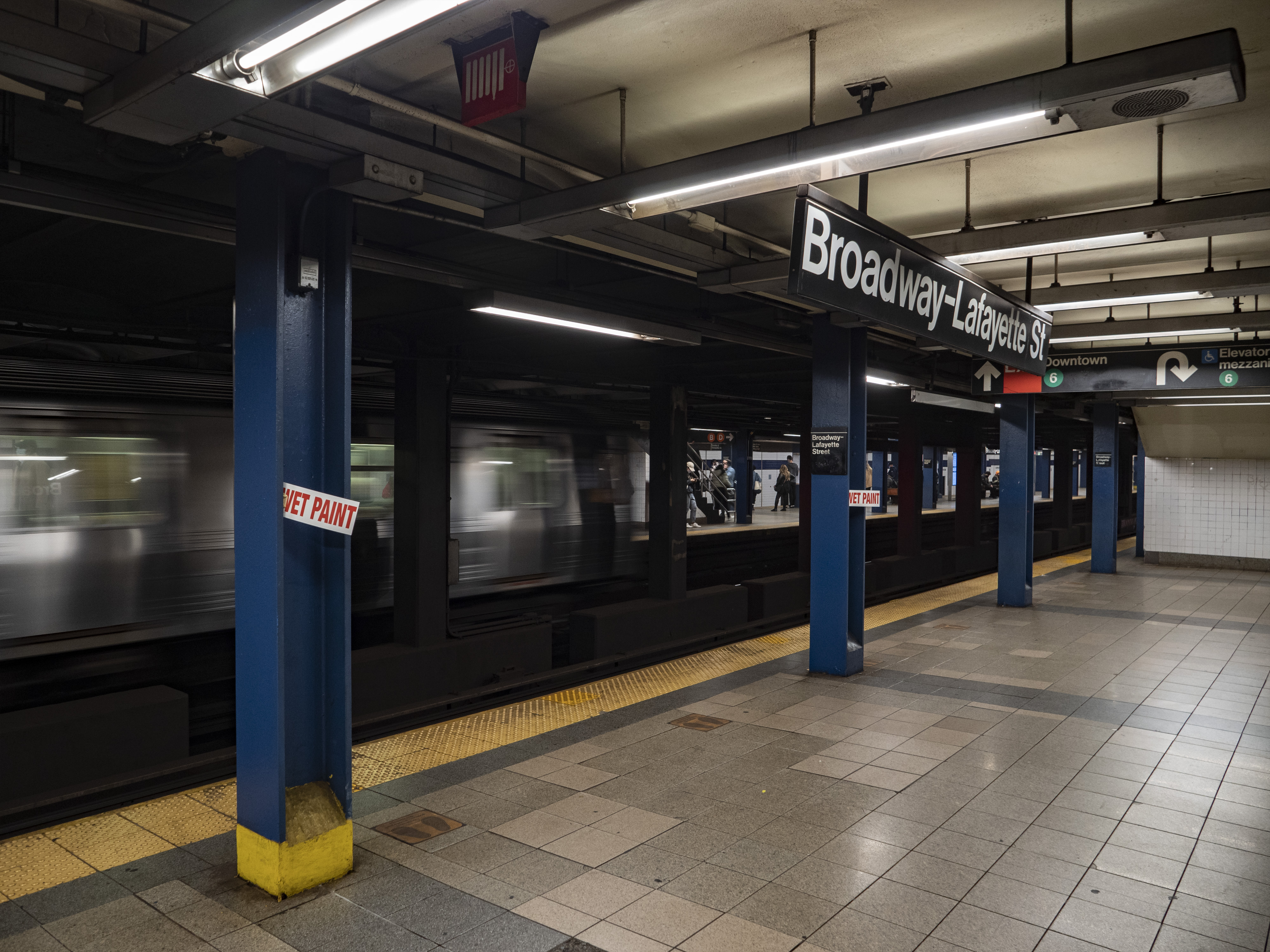
- R68A B train leaving the southbound platform

Station statistics
- Division: B (IND)
- Line: IND Sixth Avenue Line
- Services: B (weekdays during the day); D (all times); F (all times) <F> (two rush hour trains, peak direction); M (weekdays during the day)
- Structure: Underground
- Platforms: 2 island platforms cross-platform interchange
- Tracks: 4

Other information
- Opened: January 1, 1936; 90 years ago
- Accessible: Yes
Services
Preceding station	New York City Subway	Following station
West Fourth Street–Washington Square B D F <F> M via 47th–50th Streets–Rockefeller Center	Express	Grand Street B D services split
West Fourth Street–Washington Square B D F <F> M via 47th–50th Streets–Rockefeller Center	Local	Second Avenue F <F> toward Coney Island–Stillwell Avenue
West Fourth Street–Washington Square B D F <F> M via 47th–50th Streets–Rockefeller Center	Local	Essex Street M toward Middle Village–Metropolitan Avenue
Track layout
Station service legend
Symbol	Description
Stops all times	Stops all times
Stops all times except late nights	Stops all times except late nights
Stops weekdays during the day	Stops weekdays during the day
Stops rush hours in the peak direction only (limited service)	Stops rush hours in the peak direction only (limited service)

The Broadway–Lafayette Street station on the IND Sixth Avenue Line is an express station, located on East Houston Street between Broadway and Lafayette Street in Manhattan. It has four tracks and two island platforms. The D and F stop here at all times, while the B and M stop here only on weekdays during the day. The B and D run on the inner express tracks and the F and M run on the outer local tracks. The next stop to the west (railroad north) is West Fourth Street–Washington Square for all service, while the next stop to the east (railroad south) is Second Avenue for F trains, Essex Street for M trains, and Grand Street for B and D trains.

The centers of both platforms have three staircases that go up to a mezzanine, where wide staircases on either side go up to the station's three fare control areas.

=== Design ===
When the station opened, the walls adjacent to the tracks had white tiles with a blue tile band. The tile band was part of a color-coded tile system used throughout the IND. The tile colors were designed to facilitate navigation for travelers going away from Lower Manhattan. Because the next station to the north, West Fourth Street–Washington Square, is an express station, the adjacent stations to the north and south both used different tile colors.

Both outer track walls have been renovated with a blue trim line on a black border and small "BROADWAY" tile captions beneath in white lettering on a black background. Blue I-beam columns run along either side of both platforms at regular intervals with alternating ones having the standard black station name plate and white lettering.

=== Track layout ===
West (railroad north) of this station, there are crossovers between the two northbound tracks and a single one between the express tracks. The line turns north along Sixth Avenue and goes through a complex set of switches and crossovers with the IND Eighth Avenue Line before arriving at West Fourth Street–Washington Square.

East (railroad south) of this station, there used to be a storage track between the two northbound tracks as well as a diamond crossover between the two southbound tracks prior to the construction of the Chrystie Street Connection; the two express tracks continued to Second Avenue and ended at bumper blocks east of that station. In 1957, construction of the Chrystie Street connection began; the storage track became the new northbound track for present-day M trains from Essex Street, the diamond crossover between the southbound tracks were removed, and the express tracks were diverted to Grand Street. A new southbound connection was established for present-day M trains to Essex Street. The Chrystie Street connection with the new track configurations opened in November 1967. Presently, B and D trains turn south down Chrystie Street with a stop at Grand Street before crossing the Manhattan Bridge into Brooklyn. F trains continue directly east with a stop at Second Avenue, turn south on Essex Street with two more stops at Delancey Street and East Broadway, before passing under the East River through the Rutgers Street Tunnel into Brooklyn. M trains use a connection that leads to Essex Street on the BMT Nassau Street Line before crossing the Williamsburg Bridge into Brooklyn.

== See also ==
- List of New York City Designated Landmarks in Manhattan below 14th Street
- National Register of Historic Places listings in Manhattan below 14th Street
