= Spring Street station (IRT Lexington Avenue Line) =

New York City Subway station in Manhattan

Spring Street
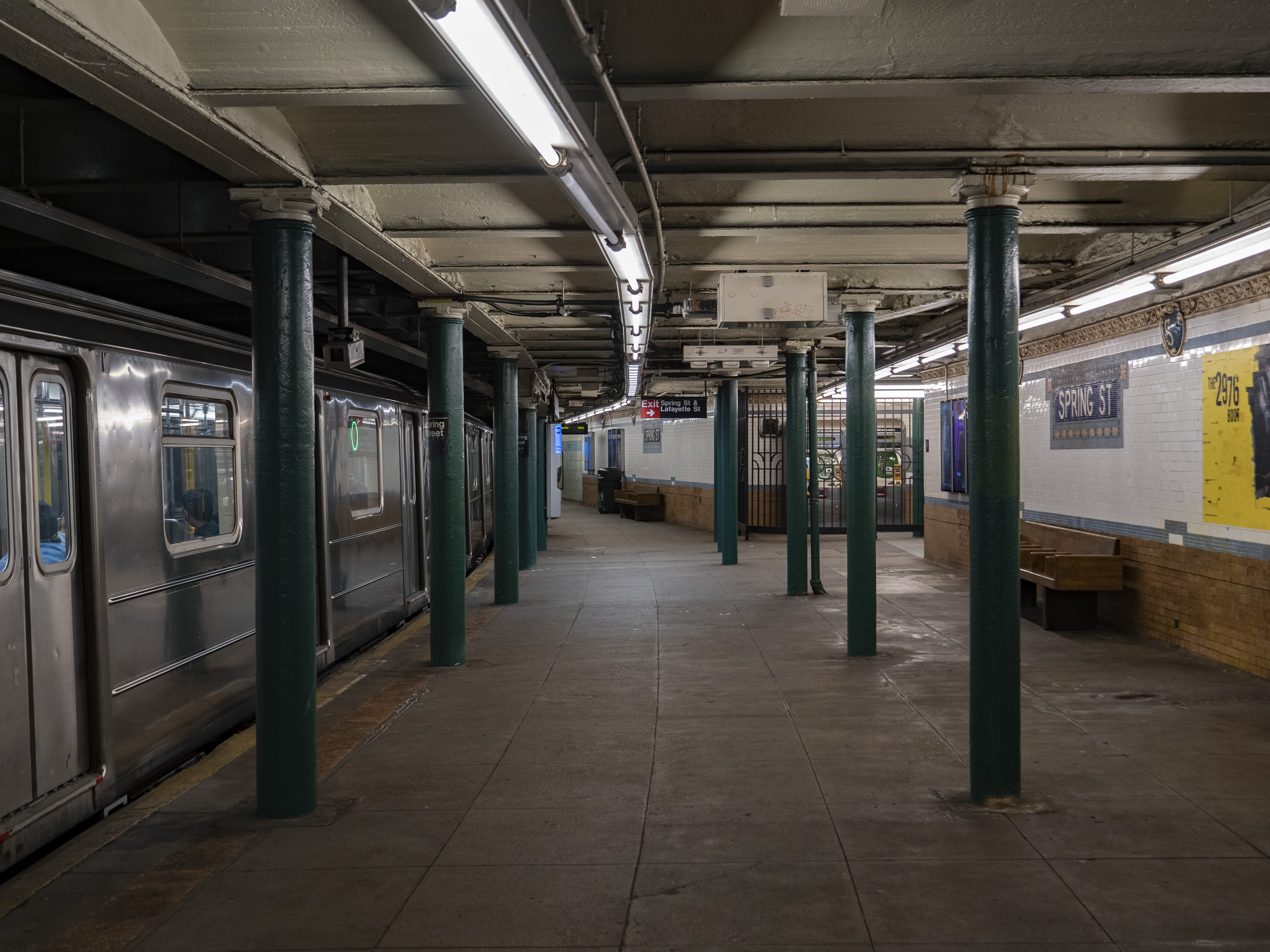
- A northbound R62A 6 train at the station

Station statistics
- Address: Spring Street & Lafayette Street; New York, New York
- Borough: Manhattan
- Locale: Little Italy, SoHo
- Coordinates: 40°43′20″N 73°59′50″W
- Division: A (IRT)
- Line: IRT Lexington Avenue Line
- Services: 4 (late nights); 6 (all times) <6> (weekdays until 8:45 p.m., peak direction)
- Structure: Underground
- Platforms: 2 side platforms
- Tracks: 4

Other information
- Opened: October 27, 1904; 122 years ago

Traffic
- 2025: 3,330,280 ▲4%
- Rank: 111 out of 423
Services
Preceding station	New York City Subway	Following station
Bleecker Street 4 6 <6> toward Pelham Bay Park	Local	Canal Street 4 6 <6> toward Brooklyn Bridge–City Hall
does not stop here
Location
Location within New York City Subway
Location within New York City
Location within New York
Track layout
Street map
Station service legend
Symbol	Description
Stops all times	Stops all times
Stops late nights only	Stops late nights only
Stops rush hours in the peak direction only	Stops rush hours in the peak direction only

The Spring Street station is a local station on the IRT Lexington Avenue Line of the New York City Subway. Located at the intersection of Lafayette Street and Spring Street in SoHo and Little Italy, Manhattan, it is served by 6 trains at all times, <6> trains during weekdays in the peak direction, and 4 trains during late night hours.

The Spring Street station was constructed for the Interborough Rapid Transit Company (IRT) as part of the city's first subway line, which was approved in 1900. Construction of the line segment that includes the Spring Street station started on September 12 of the same year. The station opened on October 27, 1904, as one of the original 28 stations of the New York City Subway. The station's platforms were lengthened in the late 1950s.

The Spring Street station contains two side platforms and four tracks; express trains use the inner two tracks to bypass the station. The station was built with tile and mosaic decorations, which are continued along the platform extensions. The station contains exits to Spring Street at the center of each platform. The platforms are not connected to each other within fare control.

== History ==
=== Construction and opening ===
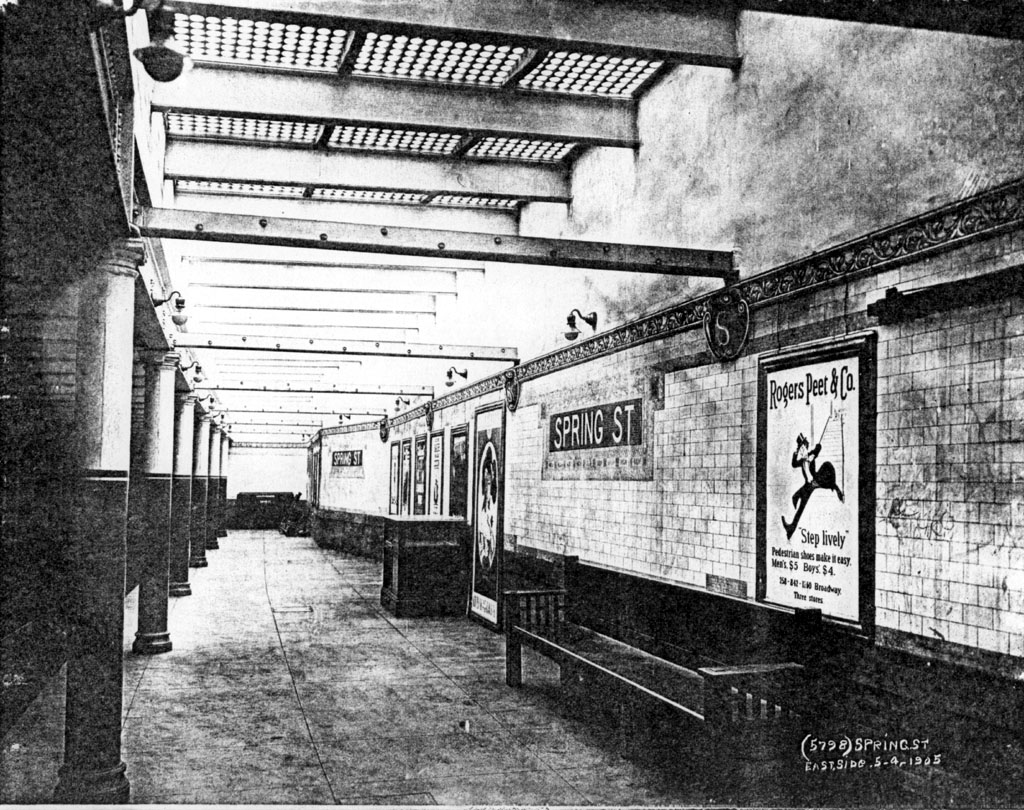
A 1905 photo of the station's original glass ceilings, which let in natural light

Planning for a subway line in New York City dates to 1864. However, development of what would become the city's first subway line did not start until 1894, when the New York State Legislature authorized the Rapid Transit Act. The subway plans were drawn up by a team of engineers led by William Barclay Parsons, the Rapid Transit Commission's chief engineer. It called for a subway line from New York City Hall in lower Manhattan to the Upper West Side, where two branches would lead north into the Bronx. A plan was formally adopted in 1897, and legal challenges were resolved near the end of 1899. The Rapid Transit Construction Company, organized by John B. McDonald and funded by August Belmont Jr., signed Contract 1 with the Rapid Transit Commission in February 1900, in which it would construct the subway and maintain a 50-year operating lease from the opening of the line. In 1901, the firm of Heins & LaFarge was hired to design the underground stations. Belmont incorporated the Interborough Rapid Transit Company (IRT) in April 1902 to operate the subway.

The Spring Street station was constructed as part of the IRT's original line, particularly the section from Chambers Street to Great Jones Street. Construction on this section of the line began on July 10, 1900, and was awarded to Degnon-McLean Contracting Company. Two days after construction began, the contract was modified to widen the subway at Spring Street to allow for the construction of 600 feet (183 m) of a fifth track. By early 1902, the adjacent tunnel had been completed, and the buildings on either side of Lafayette Street (then known as Elm Street) were being underpinned in anticipation of the construction of the subway station itself. The stretch of Elm Street north of Spring Street was being repaved by that September, after the tunnel was completed. The Rapid Transit Commission had yet to pay McDonald for his work by January 1903, in part because sewage lines on the west side of Elm Street had not been completed.

By late 1903, the subway was nearly complete, but the IRT Powerhouse and the system's electrical substations were still under construction, delaying the system's opening. The Spring Street station opened on October 27, 1904, as one of the original 28 stations of the New York City Subway from City Hall to 145th Street on the Broadway–Seventh Avenue Line.

=== Service changes and station renovations ===
==== 1900s to 1930s ====
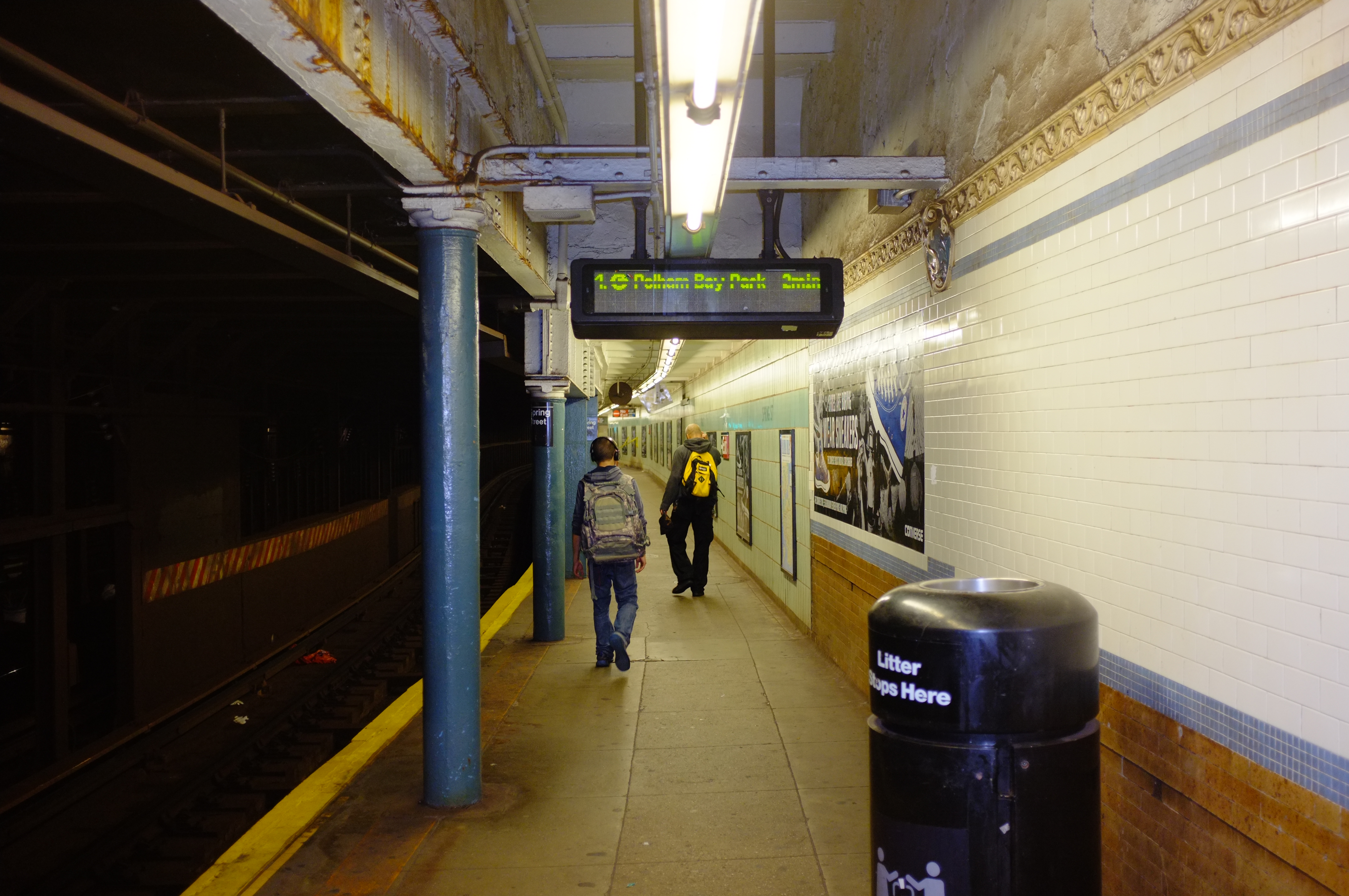
View of the transition between the original platform section and the platform extension

After the initial system was completed in 1908, the station was served by local trains along both the West Side (now the Broadway–Seventh Avenue Line to Van Cortlandt Park–242nd Street) and East Side (now the Lenox Avenue Line). West Side local trains had their southern terminus at City Hall during rush hours and South Ferry at other times, and had their northern terminus at 242nd Street. East Side local trains ran from City Hall to Lenox Avenue (145th Street).

In 1909, to address overcrowding, the New York Public Service Commission proposed lengthening the platforms at stations along the original IRT subway. As part of a modification to the IRT's construction contracts made on January 18, 1910, the company was to lengthen station platforms to accommodate ten-car express and six-car local trains. In addition to $1.5 million (equivalent to $51.8 million in 2025) spent on platform lengthening, $500,000 (equivalent to $17.3 million in 2025) was spent on building additional entrances and exits. It was anticipated that these improvements would increase capacity by 25 percent. Platforms at local stations, such as the Spring Street station, were lengthened by between 20 and 30 feet (6.1 and 9.1 m). The northbound platform was extended to the south. Six-car local trains began operating in October 1910. The Lexington Avenue Line opened north of Grand Central–42nd Street in 1918, and the original line was divided into an H-shaped system. All local trains were sent via the Lexington Avenue Line, running along the Pelham Line in the Bronx.

In December 1922, the Transit Commission approved a $3 million project to lengthen platforms at 14 local stations along the original IRT line, including Spring Street and seven other stations on the Lexington Avenue Line. Platform lengths at these stations would be increased from 225 to 436 feet (69 to 133 m). The commission postponed the platform-lengthening project in September 1923, at which point the cost had risen to $5.6 million. The commission again considered lengthening the IRT platforms at Spring Street in December 1927. At the end of the month, the Transit Commission requested that the IRT create plans to lengthen the platforms at Bleecker Street and three other Lexington Avenue Line stations to 480 feet (150 m). The New York City Board of Transportation drew up plans for the project, but the federal government placed an injunction against the commission's platform-lengthening decree, which remained in place for over a year. The commission approved the plans in mid-1929; the Spring Street station's southbound platform was to be extended 251 feet (77 m) to the south, while the northbound platform was to be extended 258 feet (79 m) south. The IRT refused, claiming that the city government was responsible for the work, and obtained a federal injunction to prevent the commission from forcing the IRT to lengthen the platforms. In late 1930, the commission requested that the New York Supreme Court force the IRT to lengthen platforms at the Canal Street and Spring Street stations.

==== 1940s to present ====
The city government took over the IRT's operations on June 12, 1940. In late 1959, contracts were awarded to extend the platforms at Bowling Green, Wall Street, Fulton Street, Canal Street, Spring Street, Bleecker Street, Astor Place, Grand Central–42nd Street, 86th Street, and 125th Street to 525 feet (160 m). In April 1960, work began on a $3,509,000 project (equivalent to $38.2 million in 2025) to lengthen platforms at seven of these stations to accommodate ten-car trains. The northbound platforms at Canal Street, Spring Street, Bleecker Street, and Astor Place were lengthened from 225 to 525 feet (69 to 160 m); the platform extensions at these stations opened on February 19, 1962.

The station was renovated in the late 1980s. After a mosaic panel fell off the wall during 1988, the renovation was temporarily halted.

== Station layout ==
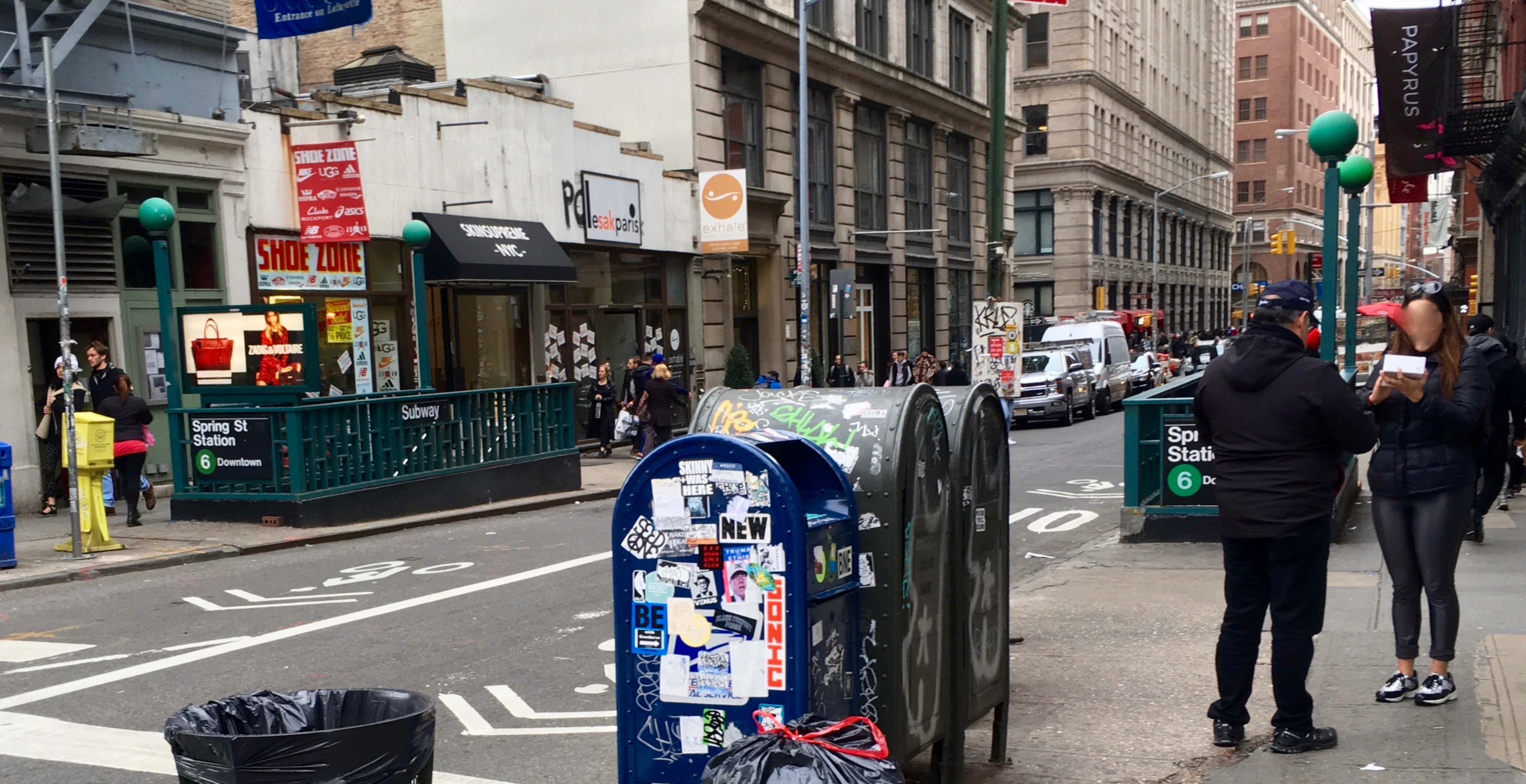
Stairs to downtown platform

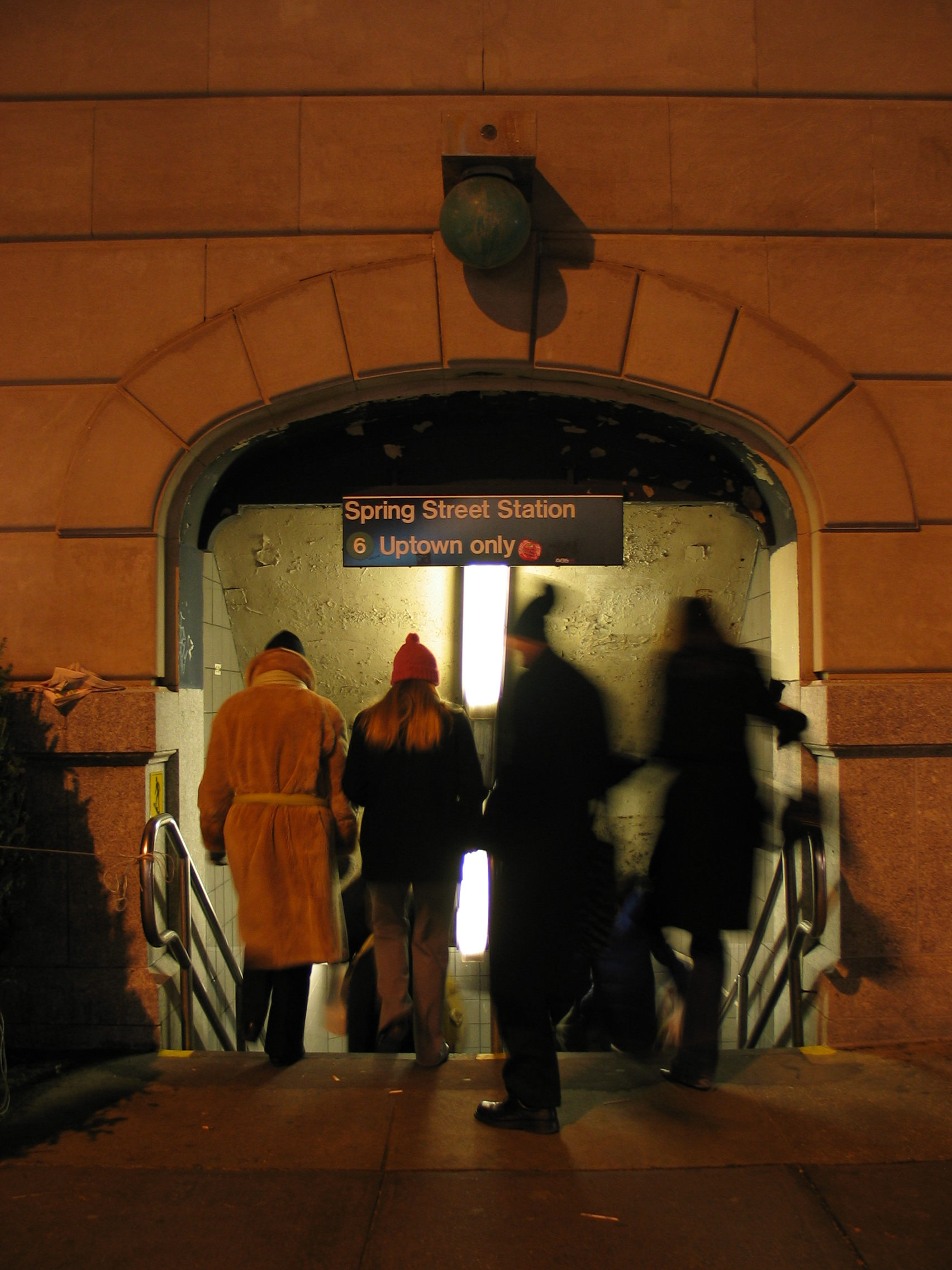
View of an entrance to the uptown platform.

Like other local stations, Spring Street has four tracks and two side platforms. The 6 stops here at all times, rush-hour and midday <6> trains stop here in the peak direction; and the 4 stops here during late nights. The two express tracks are used by the 4 and 5 trains during daytime hours. The station is between Bleecker Street to the north and Canal Street to the south. The platforms were originally 200 feet (61 m) long, like at other local stations on the original IRT, but as a result of the 1959 platform extensions, became 525 feet (160 m) long. The platform extensions are at the front ends of the original platforms: the southbound platform was extended southward and the northbound platform was extended northward. This resulted in the two platforms being offset from each other. Both platforms are slightly curved. Fixed platform barriers, which are intended to prevent commuters falling to the tracks, are positioned near the platform edges.

Spring Street had a fifth center track at the time of its opening. The track was intended as a storage siding and was 600 feet (183 m) long. This track did not last long; it was reportedly disconnected and removed in 1906, only two years after the subway opened. The trackway is now used as the location of a mechanical room.

=== Design ===
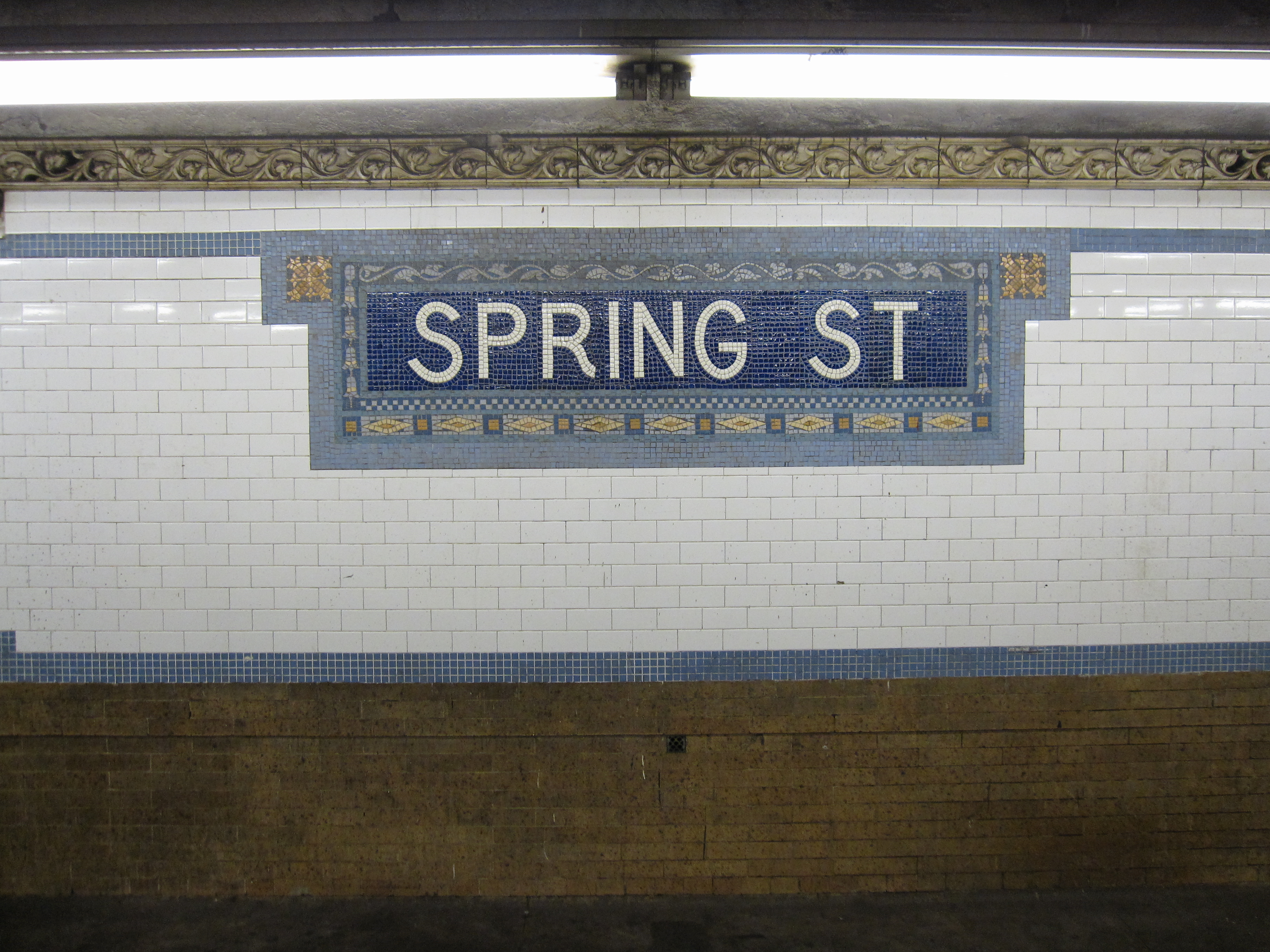
Original name tablet mosaic, by Heins & LaFarge / Manhattan Glass Tile Company

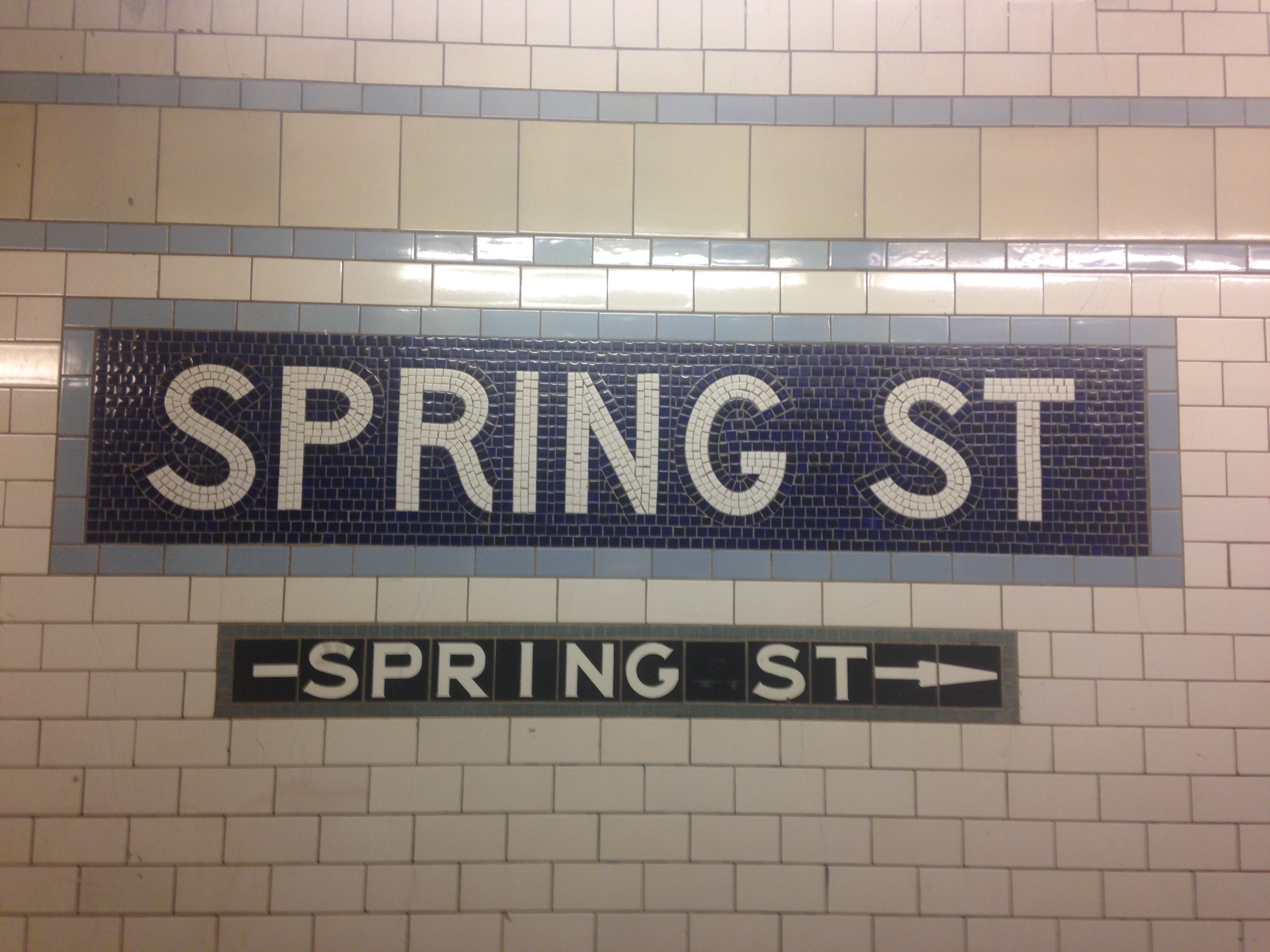
Additional mosaic on the downtown platform extension

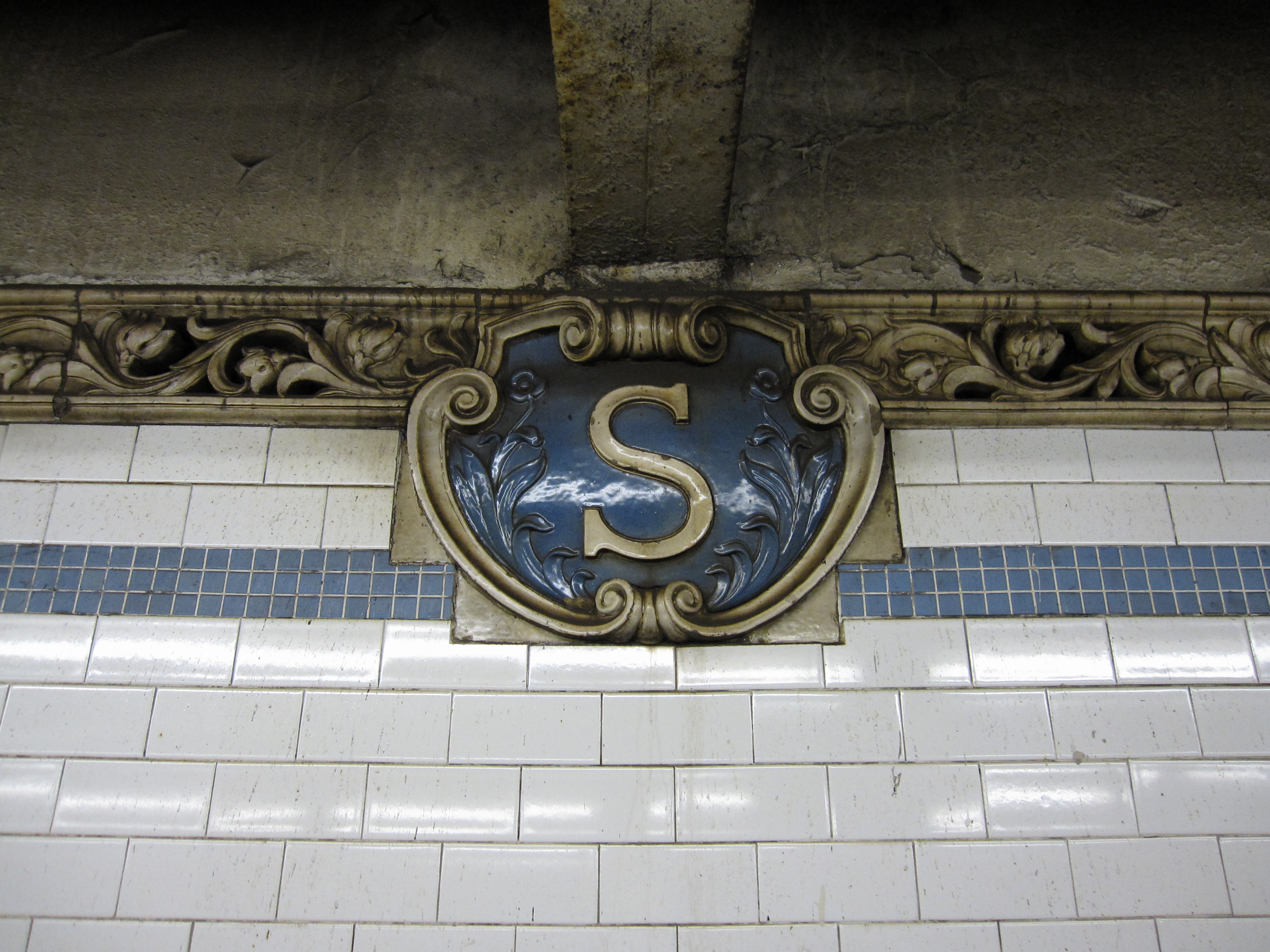
Small "S" cartouches, Atlantic Terra Cotta Company (1904)

As with other stations built as part of the original IRT, the tunnel is covered by a U-shaped trough that contains utility pipes and wires. This trough contains a foundation of concrete no less than 4 inches (100 mm) thick. Each platform consists of 3-inch-thick (7.6 cm) concrete slabs, beneath which are drainage basins. The original platforms contain circular, cast-iron Doric-style columns spaced every 15 feet (4.6 m), while the platform extensions contain I-beam columns. Additional columns between the tracks, spaced every 5 feet (1.5 m), support the jack-arched concrete station roofs. There is a 1-inch (25 mm) gap between the trough wall and the platform walls, which are made of 4-inch (100 mm)-thick brick covered over by a tiled finish.

The original decorative scheme consists of blue tile station-name tablets, light blue tile bands, a white terracotta cornice, and light blue terracotta plaques. The mosaic tiles at all original IRT stations were manufactured by the American Encaustic Tile Company, which subcontracted the installations at each station. The decorative work was performed by tile contractor Manhattan Glass Tile Company and terracotta contractor Atlantic Terra Cotta Company. The ceilings of the original platforms and fare control areas contain plaster molding. The station has small "S" cartouches with two poppies from 1904, made by Atlantic Terra Cotta, and large mosaic tablets by Heins & LaFarge, also from 1904. Other small "S" and "Spring St" mosaics are newer.

Where the platforms have been extended, the walls have green tiles and a darker green trim line with "SPRING ST" written on it in black sans serif font at regular intervals.

=== Exits ===
Spring Street has four entrances, two to each platform. The northbound entrances are at either eastern corner of Lafayette and Spring Streets, while the southbound entrances are at either western corner of the same intersection. The entrance to the southwestern corner is located within the building line at 225 Lafayette Street, a 12-story building built in 1925 for the East River Savings Bank.

== In popular culture ==
This station is featured in the 2008 film Cloverfield. The scene was not filmed there, however. The station is featured in the season 3 episode, "Lo-Fi", in the television show Criminal Minds.
