= Second Avenue station =

New York City Subway station in Manhattan

2 Avenue
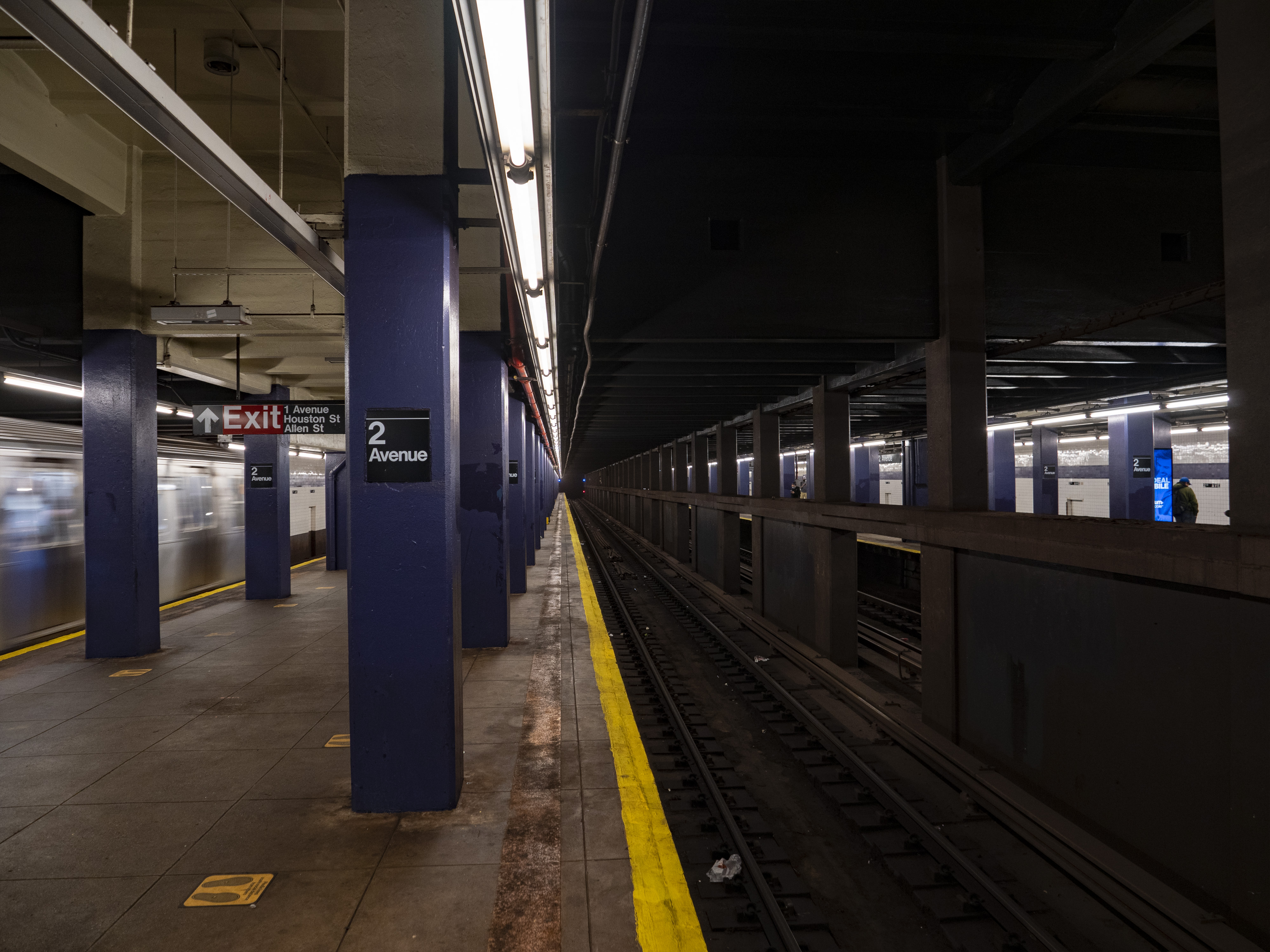
- View from northbound platform

Station statistics
- Address: East Houston Street & Second Avenue; New York, New York
- Borough: Manhattan
- Locale: East Village, Lower East Side
- Coordinates: 40.723616°N 73.991117°W
- Division: B (IND)
- Line: IND Sixth Avenue Line
- Services: F (all times) <F> (two rush hour trains, peak direction)
- Transit: NYCT Bus: M15, M15 SBS, M21
- Structure: Underground
- Platforms: 2 island platforms cross-platform interchange
- Tracks: 4 (2 in regular service)

Other information
- Opened: January 1, 1936; 90 years ago
- Accessible: No; planned
- Former/other names: Lower East Side–Second Avenue

Traffic
- 2025: 4,548,544 ▲7.3%
- Rank: 67 out of 423
Services
Preceding station	New York City Subway	Following station
Broadway–Lafayette Street F <F> toward Jamaica–179th Street	Local	Delancey Street F <F> toward Coney Island–Stillwell Avenue
Location
Location within New York City Subway
Location within New York City
Location within New York
Track layout
Street map
Station service legend
Symbol	Description
Stops all times	Stops all times
Stops rush hours in the peak direction only (limited service)	Stops rush hours in the peak direction only (limited service)

The Second Avenue station is a station on the IND Sixth Avenue Line of the New York City Subway, located at the intersection of Second Avenue and Houston Street on the border between the East Village and the Lower East Side, in Manhattan. It is served by the F train at all times and the <F> train during rush hours in the peak direction.

== History ==
The station opened on January 1, 1936, as part of the portion of the Sixth Avenue Line between West Fourth Street–Washington Square and East Broadway. Upon opening, E trains, which ran from Jackson Heights, Queens to Hudson Terminal, were shifted to the new line to East Broadway. Two express tracks were built from West Fourth Street, under Houston Street, until Essex Street-Avenue A, with the express tracks effectively terminating at the Second Avenue station since there were no stops east of there. The tracks were intended to travel under the East River and connect with the never-built IND Worth Street Line in Williamsburg, Brooklyn.

From December 2001 to June 2010, this station was known on transit maps and announced on digital announcements as the Lower East Side–Second Avenue station, when it served as the southern terminal for V trains. A limited number of rush-hour M trains from Queens terminated here between July 2017 and April 2018 during a reconstruction project on the BMT Myrtle Avenue Line (replicating the former V service).

In 2019, the MTA announced that this station would become ADA-accessible as part of the agency's 2020–2024 Capital Program. In 2026, as part of a pilot program to install vending machines across the New York City Subway system, a vending machine was installed within one of the station's unused retail spaces.

== Station layout ==
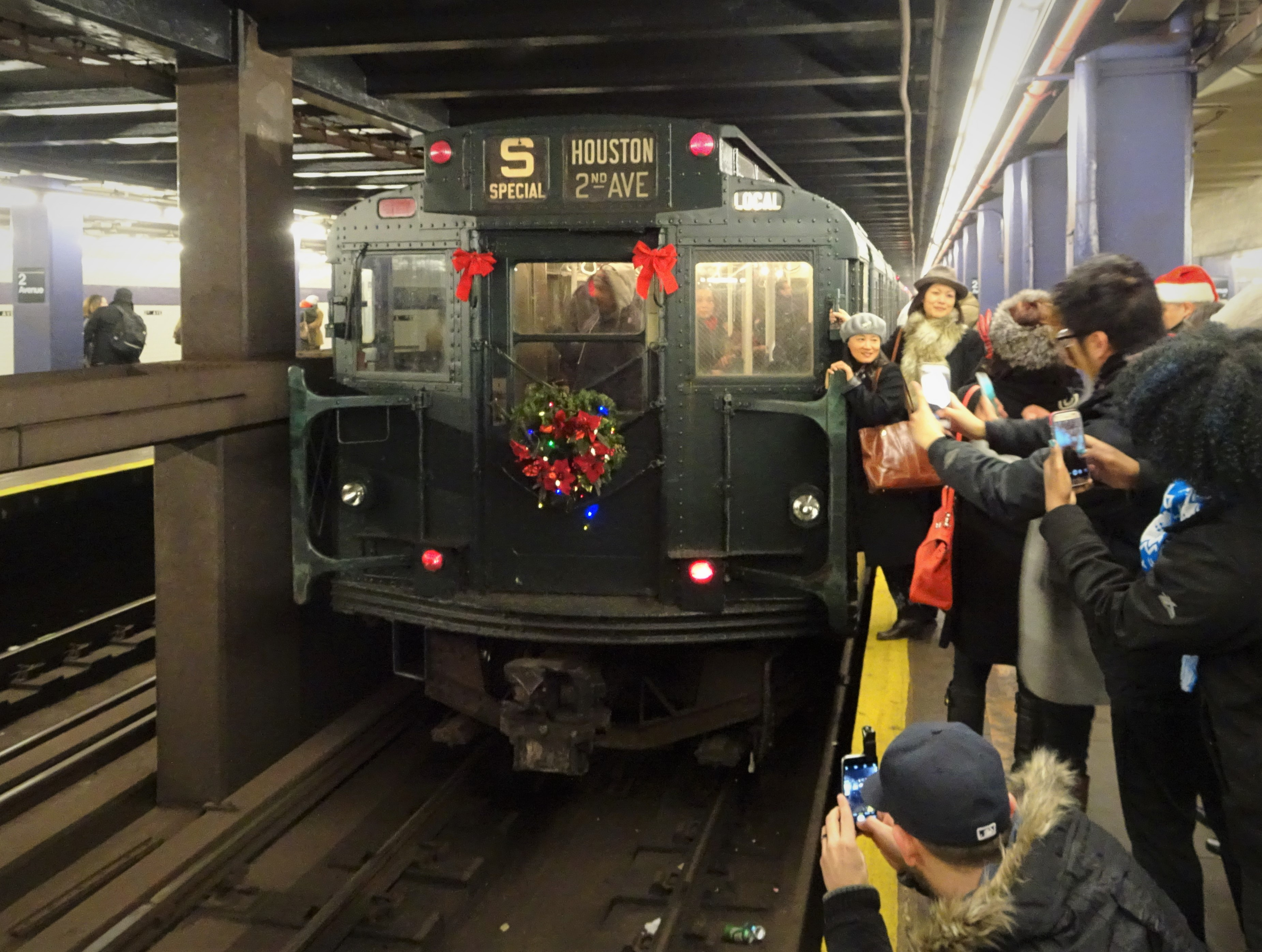
The subway's holiday train at the station

Second Avenue has two island platforms and four tracks. F trains serve the station at all times and run on the outer tracks, while the inner tracks are used only for reroutes and special events. The station is between Broadway–Lafayette Street to the west (railroad north) and Delancey Street to the east (railroad south).

When the station opened, all four Sixth Avenue tracks ran continuously from West Fourth Street through Second Avenue. During the construction of the Chrystie Street Connection in the 1950s and 1960s, the center express tracks at Broadway–Lafayette Street were severed from the tracks at Second Avenue and rerouted to the Chrystie Street subway, running through Grand Street station to the north side of the Manhattan Bridge.

West (railroad north) of the station, the inner tracks are connected by a diamond crossover before merging with the outer local tracks; this allows the station to be used as a terminal for southbound trains. East (railroad south) of the station, the express tracks end at bumper blocks, while the local tracks continue along Houston Street before curving south into Essex Street and continuing through the Delancey Street station.

The trackside walls have a medium Parma violet trim line with a slightly darker border, and small tile captions reading "2ND AVE" in white on black run below it at regular intervals. The platform columns are concrete and painted indigo, and there are especially large columns with built-in benches at the centers of the platforms. Despite the station's name, the exit and mezzanine at Second Avenue is only open part-time. The full-time booth is located at the First Avenue mezzanine. The station previously had a full-length mezzanine. However, most of the mezzanine was closed, and the closed areas currently hold offices while the rest are used for storage space.

=== Exits ===
All entrances/exits are single-wide street stairs serving both platforms via the two mezzanine areas. The western mezzanine has two exits leading to the northwest corner of Houston Street and Second Avenue and the southwest corner of Houston Street and Chrystie Street. The eastern mezzanine has two exits leading to the northwest corner of Houston Street and First Avenue and the southwest corner of Houston Street and Allen Street. The closed mezzanine area had an exit to the median of Houston Street near Forsyth Street.

== Provisions for other lines ==
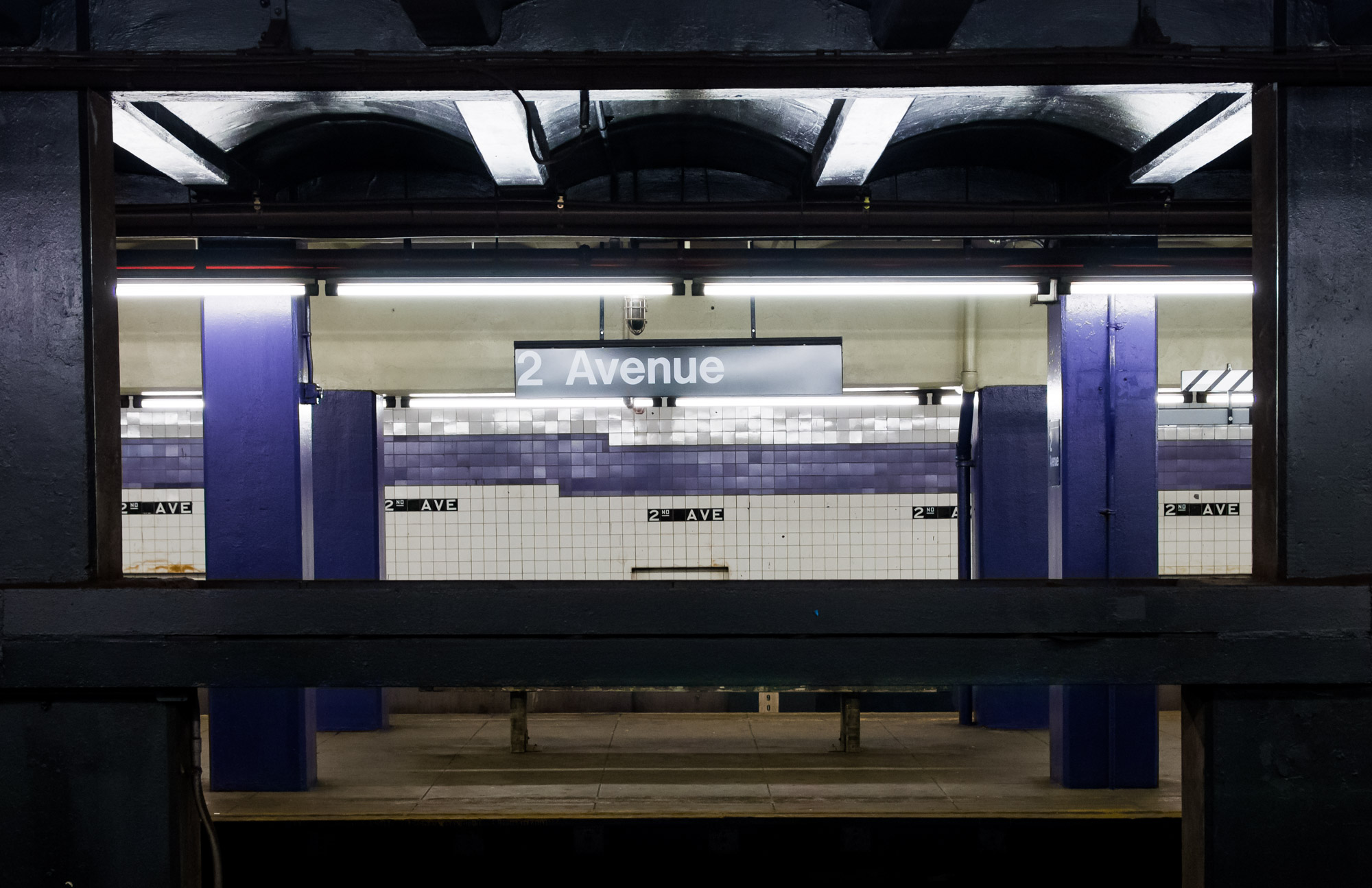
View across the platforms

=== First Avenue Subway mezzanine ===
There is another, unfinished mezzanine on the east side of First Avenue. This second mezzanine is accessible only through now-blocked passages past the east end of the platforms. This mezzanine was built to address a subway down First Avenue, if one were to be built.

=== Express tracks ===
East of the station, the center tracks continue disused along Houston, but rise to an upper level and stub-end near Avenue A at bumper blocks. Near the end, these tail tracks begin to separate to create a provision for a center track which only extends about 10 or 15 feet and stops at the bulkhead at the end of the tunnel. It was planned that these tracks would continue under the East River to the South Fourth Street Line, part of a never-built system expansion. These tracks east of the station were previously used for train storage but became an oft-frequented spot for the homeless due to its location near local missions and soup kitchens. The area was cleared out in 1990, and corrugated metal walls with bumper blocks were installed just past the east end of the platforms to seal the tunnels.

=== Second Avenue Subway service ===
As part of the 1929 IND Second System, the unbuilt plans for the Second Avenue Subway called for the new line to run directly above the existing Second Avenue station. Room was left for the anticipated four-track right-of-way above the Sixth Avenue trackways and directly east of the entrance at Second Avenue; on the west end of the platforms, the ceiling drops. Above this lower ceiling is an empty space that can fit either four trackways, two side platforms, and one island platform (similar to 34th Street–Penn Station on the IND Eighth Avenue Line) or two trackways and two side platforms. The trackways can be made out from the ceiling pattern from the active platforms. The mezzanine at Second Avenue, possibly intended as temporary, has doors that lead to the unused track space. Crew rooms were built on most of the space prior to the introduction of the V.

As part of the 21st-century construction of the Second Avenue Subway, a new Houston Street station will instead be built below the existing one, with a free transfer between them. The decision to use a deeper alignment under Chrystie Street was made to simplify construction and lessen impact to the community. (Note: See the Grand Street article for more information) Second Avenue service would be tentatively provided by the T train once Phase 3 of construction is complete. When this happens, the station would become a terminal station for southbound service. There will be a double crossover north of the station. However, Phase 4 of construction would extend the line south, below Houston Street, in the direction of Hanover Square.

In addition to the current entrances, the Second Avenue Subway station will utilize a new entrance to be constructed at Second Avenue and Third Street. In accordance with the Americans with Disabilities Act of 1990, the Second Avenue Subway platform will be wheelchair-accessible; however, it is unknown if the Sixth Avenue Line platforms will also become accessible.
