= Yorktown Heights station =

Yorktown Heights
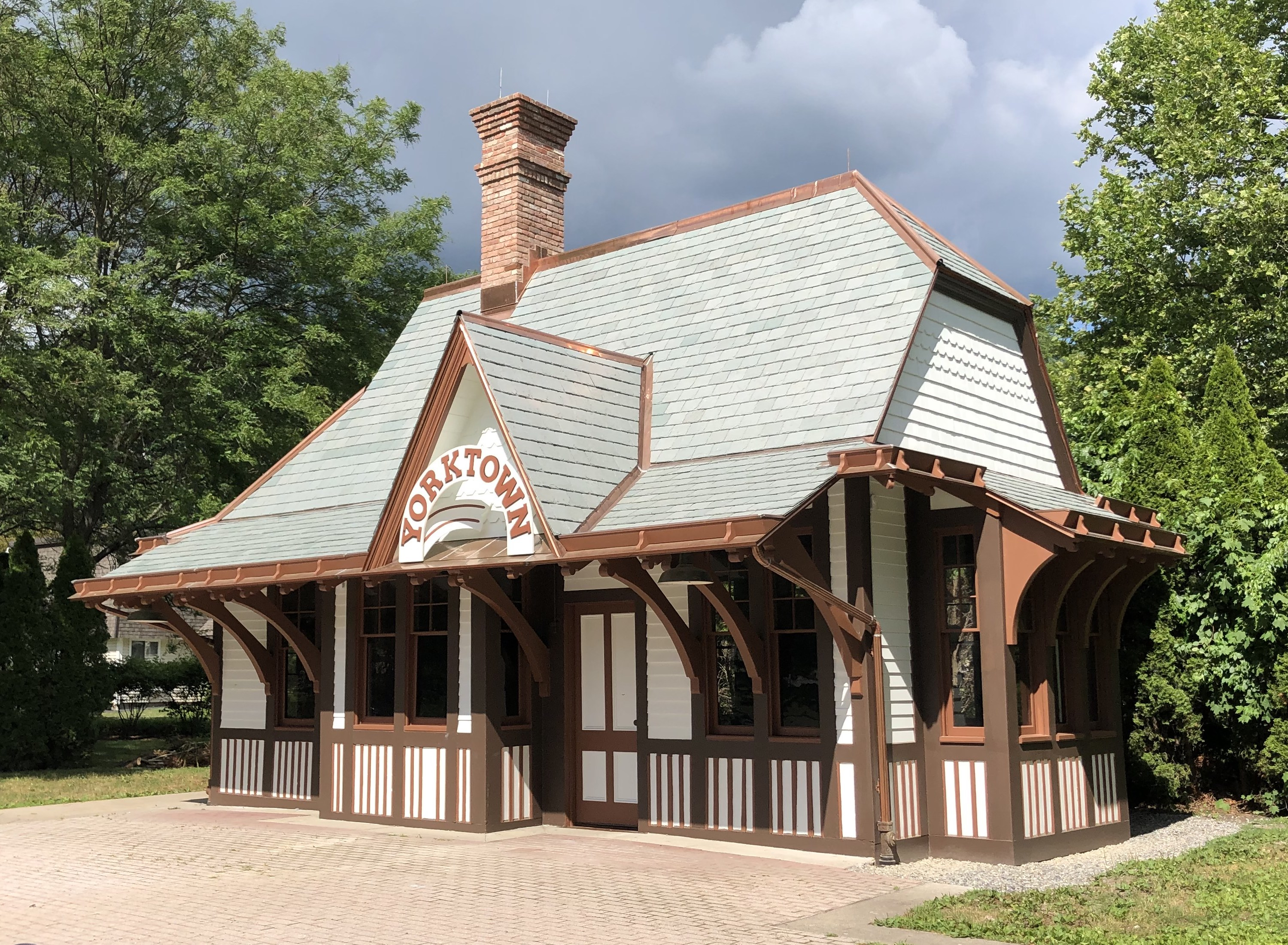
- South and west elevations with entrance after historic restoration in 2020

General information
- Location: Commerce Street, Yorktown Heights, New York
- Coordinates: 41°16′17.5″N 73°46′47″W
- Platforms: 1 side
- Tracks: 2

History
- Opened: 1877
- Closed: May 29, 1958

Former services
Preceding station	New York Central Railroad	Following station
Amawalk toward Brewster	Putnam Division	Croton Heights toward Sedgwick Avenue

U.S. National Register of Historic Places
- Designated: March 19, 1981
- Reference no.: 81000419
Location

Yorktown Heights station is a former railroad station on the Putnam Line in Yorktown Heights, New York, United States. It is a wooden building located on Commerce Street at the intersection of Underhill Avenue in Railroad Park.

The station was originally built in 1877 by the New York, Westchester and Putnam Railway along a line originally installed by the New York and Boston Railroad that is today a rail trail. It is one of the only three left in Westchester County, and one of only two in that scale and style. In 1981, it was listed on the National Register of Historic Places as Yorktown Heights Railroad Station, the only property listed in the town.

== Building ==
The station is located in a small park in the center of Yorktown. The railroad's right-of-way, now the North County Trailway, runs just to its south. It is paved in pink stone, with a connection to the base of the station.

The building itself is a small one-story frame structure. It is sided in board and batten on the lower half of its facades and clapboard above. A combination of vertical dividers between sections and a horizontal course over the water table give it a half-timber effect. The roof, with deep bracketed overhangs, is both gabled and hipped, covered in slate shingles.

Bays project on the west and south. The windows, currently, have plain wood surrounds. A brick chimney rises on the north (rear).

Inside the building is divided into two spaces, a waiting room (including the ticket office) on the south and baggage room in the north. The former has floor-to-ceiling oak paneling, oak floors, benches, with deep brackets on the ticket room cornice as well as the shelf at the window. A double Dutch door leads to the baggage room, where a bathroom has been created by partitioning.

== History ==
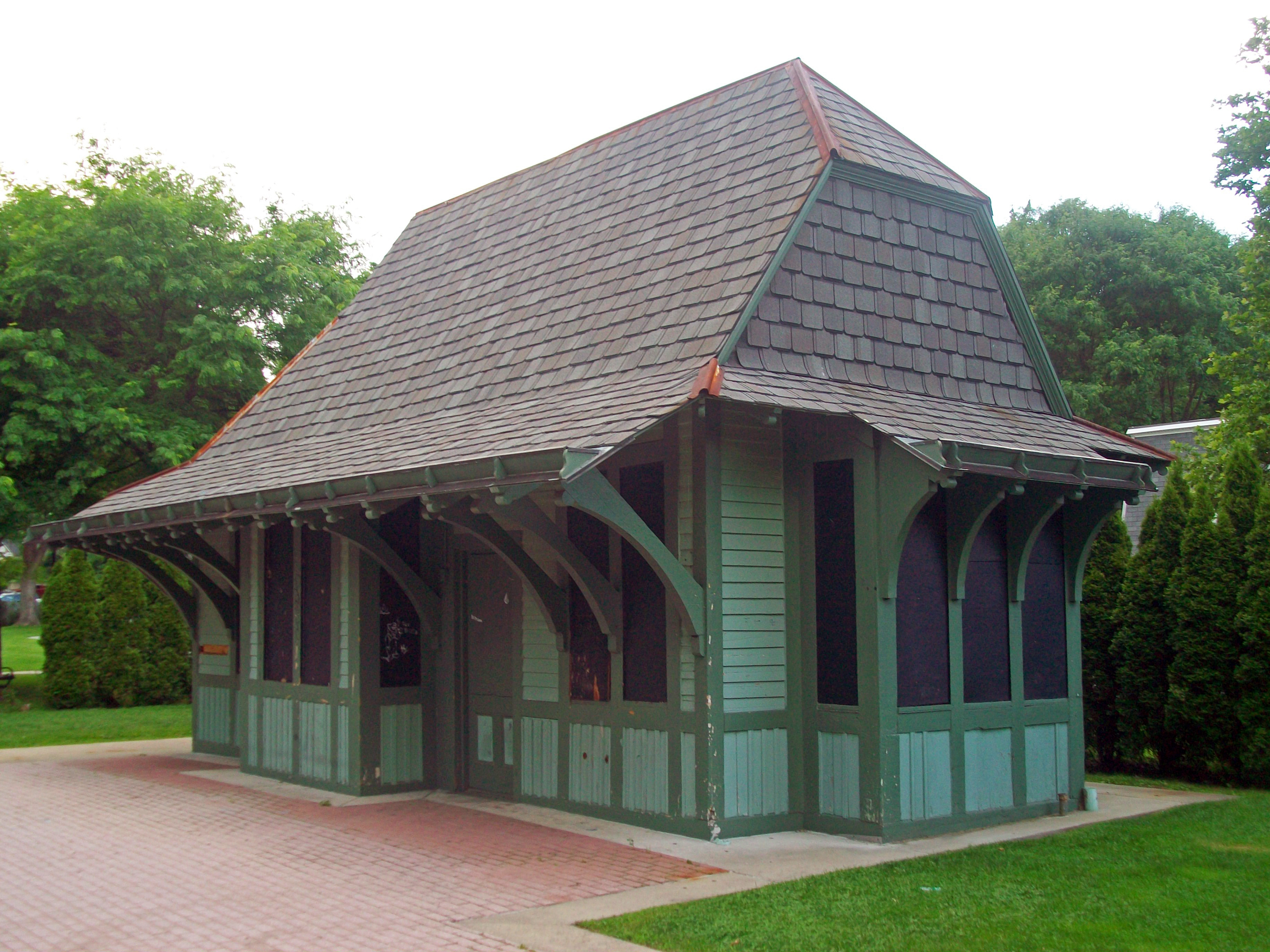
The station in 2009

Two prominent citizens of Yorktown, Edward Underhill and Charles Whitney, brought what was then the New York and Boston Railroad to the town in 1872. The station and a store were built five years later. By the 1880s the railroad station was the center of town, surrounded by five stores, a school, a hotel, two locksmiths, a wheelwright and two churches. The line and the station were later acquired by New York Central Railroad in 1894 when it took over the Old Put. In 1902 it acquired land and built a coach yard, an engine service facility. It was a site of the connection to the Mohansic Branch to Mohansic State Hospital, now the site of Franklin D. Roosevelt State Park, until 1917.

The station was closed in 1958, a year before passenger service was abandoned along the Putnam Line. Freight service was abandoned in 1962 between East Falls and Mahopac. The town bought the station in 1966 as part of its urban renewal efforts. Initially the plan was to relocate it for use as a bus station, but in 1975 that was changed. It remained on site and was restored with the intent of using it as a museum and office of the local Chamber of Commerce. In 2020, historic restoration work funded by a federal grant through the New York State Department of Transportation was completed for the entire interior and exterior of the building. The town intends to use the former station as a visitor’s center for patrons of the North County Rail Trail.

== See also ==
- National Register of Historic Places listings in northern Westchester County, New York
