= University Heights station =

Metro-North Railroad station in the Bronx, New York

University Heights
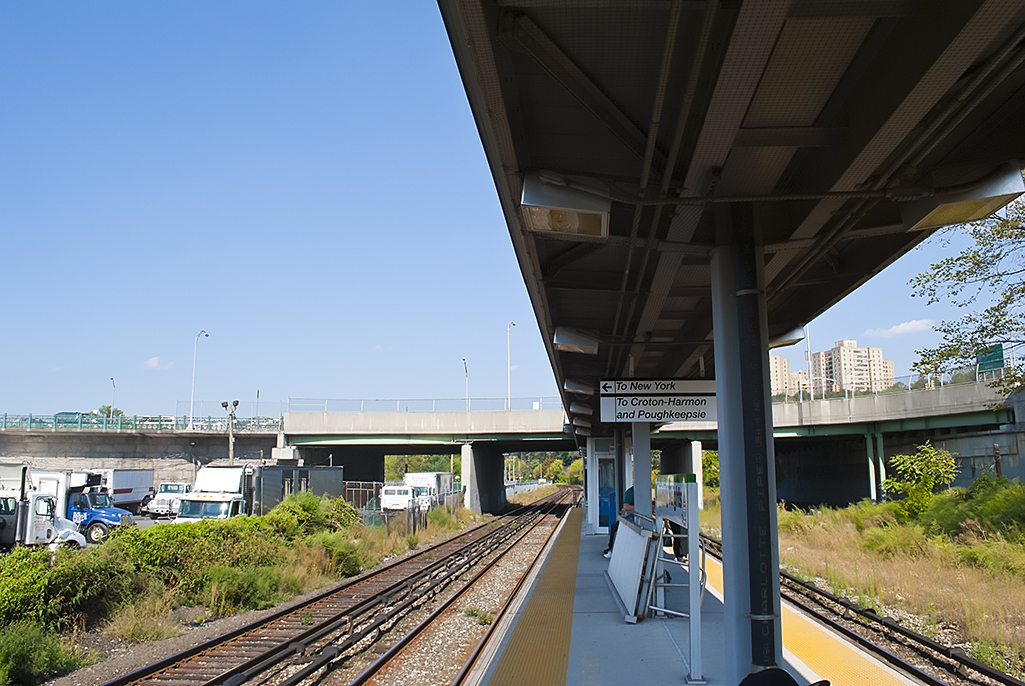
- The University Heights Metro-North station

General information
- Location: West Fordham Road & Major Deegan Expressway, University Heights, Bronx, New York
- Coordinates: 40.8614°N 73.9147°W
- Owner: Metro-North Railroad
- Line: Hudson Line
- Platforms: 1 island platform
- Tracks: 3
- Connections: New York City Bus: Bx12, Bx12 SBS

Construction
- Accessible: yes

Other information
- Fare zone: 2

History
- Electrified: 700V (DC) third rail

Passengers
- 2006: 5,720 0%

Services
Preceding station	Metro-North Railroad	Following station
Marble Hill toward Croton–Harmon	Hudson Line	Morris Heights toward Grand Central

Former services
Preceding station	New York Central Railroad	Following station
Fordham Heights toward Peekskill	Hudson Division	Morris Heights toward New York
Fordham Heights toward Brewster	Putnam Division	Morris Heights toward Sedgwick Avenue
Location

University Heights station (also known as the University Heights–West 207th Street station) is a commuter rail stop on the Metro-North Railroad's Hudson Line, serving the University Heights neighborhood of the Bronx, New York City.

The station stands between the Harlem River and the Major Deegan Expressway. Access to the platform is via a staircase from the pedestrian walkway on the south side of University Heights Bridge. It is also near the Roberto Clemente State Park.

== History ==
The station has operated since the days of the Spuyten Duyvil and Port Morris Railroad as well as the New York and Putnam Railroad late in the 19th century, though not in its present form. It was originally located north of the former 180th Street (now Osbourne Place), while a nearby Fordham Heights station was located at West Fordham Road. The two stations were merged at some point before the 1920s; demolition of the Fordham Heights Station was being planned as early as 1906. North of Fordham Road, the former NY&P branched off to the northeast on its way to Brewster.

Throughout much of the 20th century, University Heights station contained a station house over the tracks along the south side of West Fordham Road. Passenger service on the Putnam Division ended on June 1, 1958, but continued along the Hudson Division. As with many New York Central Railroad (NYCRR) stations in the Bronx, the station became a Penn Central station upon the merger between NYCRR and Pennsylvania Railroad in 1968. Penn Central continued commuter service and began tearing the station house down in 1975, before being taken over by Conrail in 1976, which turned the station over to Metro-North Railroad in 1983.

== Station layout ==
The station has one 4-car-long high-level island platform accessible by stairway or elevator from West Fordham Road.
