= Graham station (New York Central Railroad) =

Railroad station

Graham

General information
- Location: Graham Hills, Mount Pleasant, New York
- Coordinates: 41.125154°N 73.811239°W

History
- Opened: 1931

Former services
Preceding station	New York Central Railroad	Following station
Briarcliff Manor toward Brewster	Putnam Division	Eastview toward Sedgwick Avenue
Location

The Graham station was a railroad station on the New York Central Railroad's Putnam Division in the former hamlet of Graham Hills, in Mount Pleasant, New York. The Putnam Line ended passenger service in 1962; the line was abandoned and now serves as the North County Trailway rail trail.

The station was named after its location in the former hamlet of Graham Hills. The hamlet was named for Dr. Isaac Gilbert Graham, an army surgeon who served in the Revolutionary War and settled in the area around 1785.

The station was created in 1931 due to a rerouting of Putnam Division tracks. John D. Rockefeller Jr. wanted his property at Kykuit to be quieter and more pleasant, so he moved the tracks ¾ of a mile east at his expense; the task included purchase and destruction of the nearby hamlet of Eastview. The new segment was constructed from April 1930 to March 1931. It was intended to have a large waiting room, bathrooms, and an express and telegraph office, though only an open-air shelter was constructed.
