= Morris Heights station =

Metro-North Railroad station in the Bronx, New York

Morris Heights
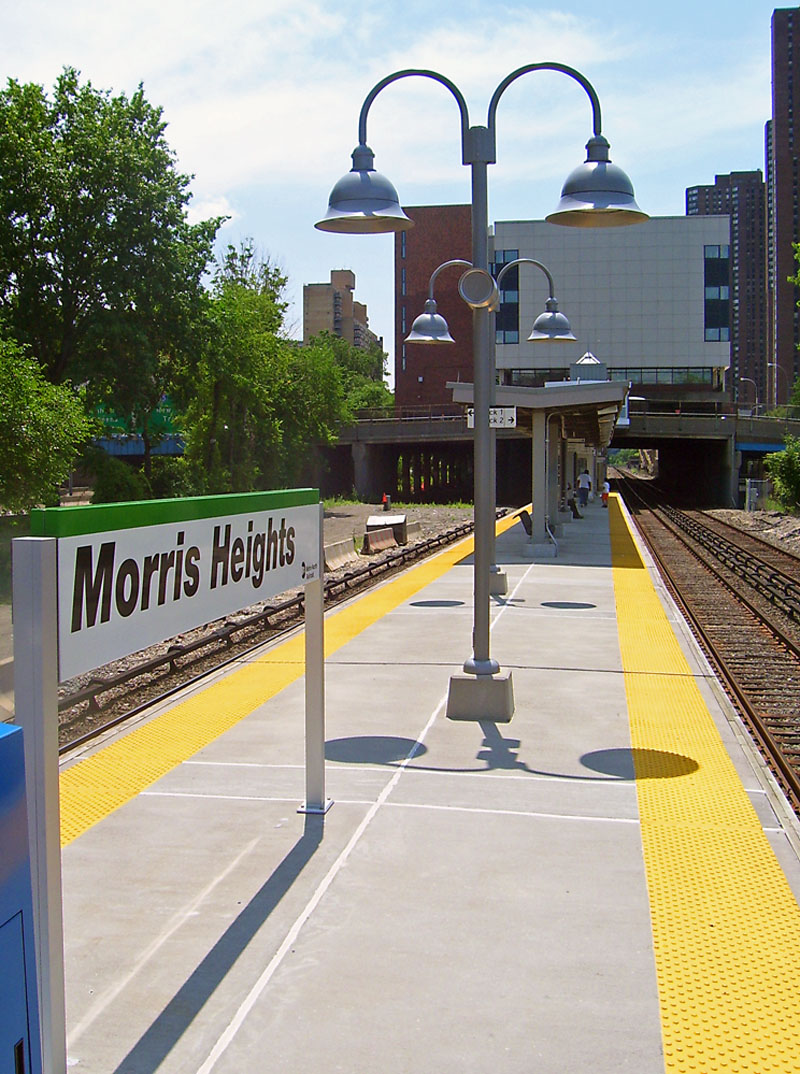
- The Morris Heights Metro-North station

General information
- Location: 229 West Tremont Avenue; Morris Heights, Bronx, New York
- Coordinates: 40.8540°N 73.9199°W
- Line: Hudson Line
- Platforms: 1 island platform
- Tracks: 3
- Connections: New York City Bus: Bx18A, Bx18B, Bx40, Bx42

Construction
- Accessible: yes

Other information
- Fare zone: 2

History
- Former names: Morris Dock

Passengers
- 2006: 6,760 0%

Services
Preceding station	Metro-North Railroad	Following station
University Heights toward Poughkeepsie	Hudson Line	Yankees–East 153rd Street toward Grand Central

Former services
Preceding station	New York Central Railroad	Following station
University Heights toward Peekskill	Hudson Division	High Bridge toward New York
University Heights toward Brewster	Putnam Division	High Bridge toward Sedgwick Avenue
Location

Morris Heights station (also known as Morris Heights–West 177th Street station) is a commuter rail stop on the Metro-North Railroad's Hudson Line, serving the Morris Heights neighborhood of the Bronx, New York City.

The station is located in the narrow strip of land between the Major Deegan Expressway and the Harlem River, next to Roberto Clemente State Park. It is also located across from the Dr. Roland N. Patterson School complex, which was built over the tracks between the bridges for Harlem River Park Drive and West Tremont Avenue.

== History ==
The station has operated since the days of the Spuyten Duyvil and Port Morris Railroad as well as the New York and Putnam Railroad late in the 19th century, though not in its present form. The station was previously named "Morris Docks" until the 1890s because it served the docks of the Harlem River waterfront which included Gas Engine & Power Company & Charles L. Seabury Company, a shipbuilding firm located on Mathewson Road along the west side of the tracks. Founded in 1896 by the merger of the formerly separate Gas Engine & Power Company & Charles L. Seabury Company, the firm operated along Morris Heights' waterfront until it moved to City Island following World War II.

Throughout much of the 20th century, Morris Heights station contained a station house over the tracks along the north side of West Tremont Avenue. Passenger service on the Putnam Division ended on June 1, 1958, but continued along the Hudson Division. As with many New York Central Railroad (NYCRR) stations in the Bronx, the station became a Penn Central station upon the merger between NYCRR and Pennsylvania Railroad in 1968. The 1970 bankruptcy of Penn Central forced it to turn service over to "MTA Central." During this time, the former Morris Heights waterfront was replaced by the Harlem River State Park, which was renamed in honor of former Pittsburg Pirates legend Roberto Clemente. MTA rebuilt Morris Heights as well many of the stations along the Hudson Line in the mid-1970's in New York City as part of a mass reconstruction project. Penn Central continued freight service until it was taken over by Conrail in 1976. Later in the decade, the Dr. Roland N. Patterson School complex was built over the tracks Harlem River Park Drive and West Tremont Avenue. Conrail and MTA turned the station over to Metro-North Railroad in 1983.

== Station layout ==
The station has one narrow, four-car-long high-level island platform accessible from West Tremont Avenue (West 177th Street).
