= Old Southeast Town Hall =

- U.S. National Register of Historic Places
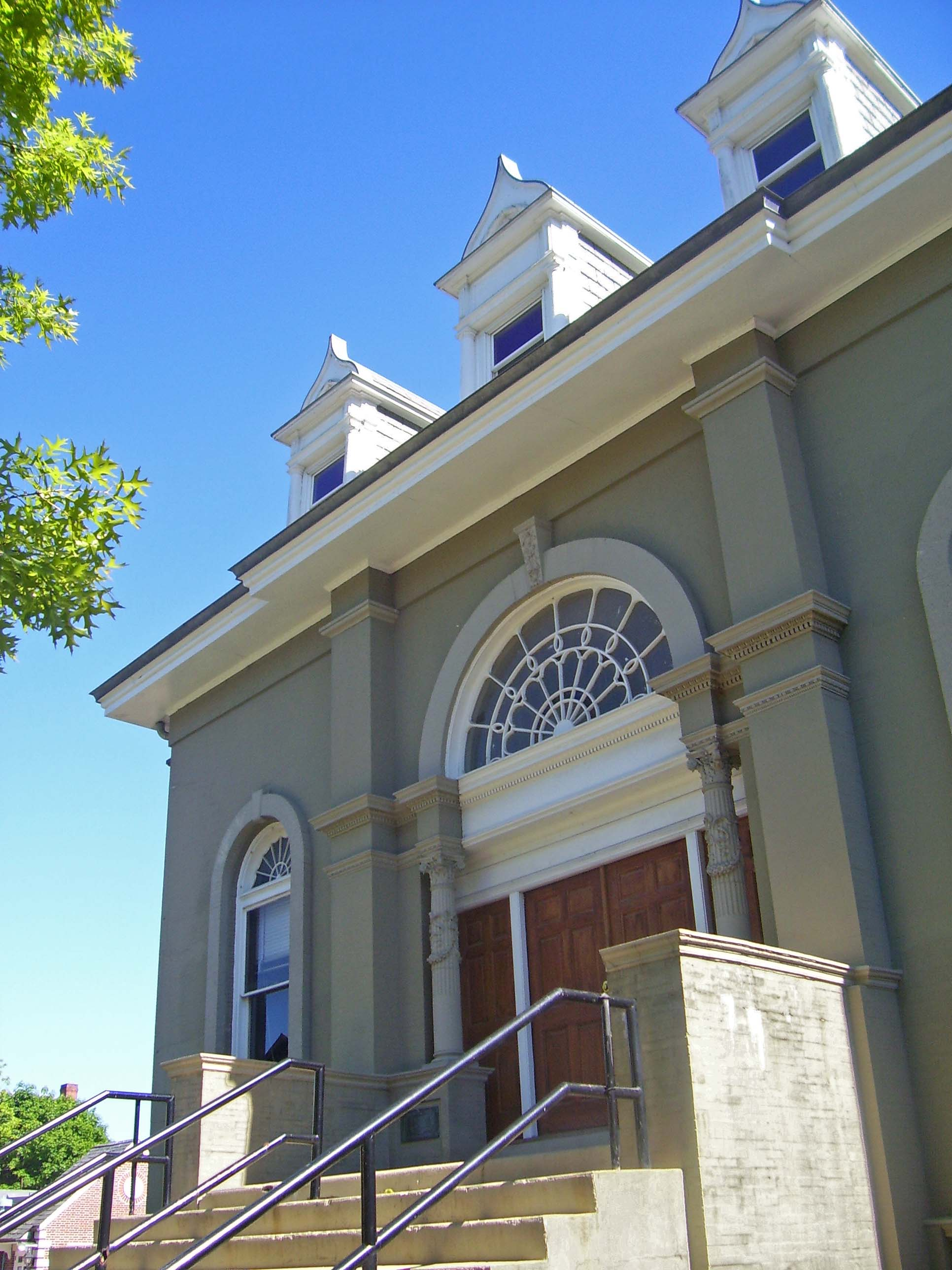
- Front (north) elevation, 2008
- Location: Brewster, NY
- Nearest city: Danbury, CT
- Coordinates: 41°23′28″N 73°37′02″W
- Area: less than one acre
- Built: 1896
- Architect: Child & DeGoll
- Architectural style: Colonial Revival
- NRHP reference No.: 79001619
- Added to NRHP: July 24, 1979

The Old Southeast Town Hall is located on Main Street (US 6) in Brewster, New York, United States. Built in 1896, it served as the main office of the Town of Southeast, which surrounds and includes Brewster. In 1964, the town's clerk and supervisor moved to the recently closed First National Bank of Brewster's building down the street (since then, they have moved to new offices on NY 22 north of the village).

Some town offices are still in the building, which also today houses the Southeast Museum. In 1979, it was added to the National Register of Historic Places in recognition of its early yet mature Colonial Revival architecture.

== Building ==
The former town hall is a three-story, three-bay rectangular structure of brick (now faced with putty-colored stucco) in common bond. The front facade has a distinctive, elaborate main entrance with a two-story portico framed by pilasters which go all the way to the roofline. The entrance itself, now behind modern storm doors, has four paneled wooden doors with a neoclassical surround with engaged columns, full entablature and large fanlight. On either side of the portico are sash windows, similarly trimmed, supported by aprons atop smaller side entrances on the first story.

The hip roof is pierced on the front by three dormer windows whose pointed crests reflect the Moorish Revival trend of the earlier 19th century. Four corbeled chimneys rise from the top.

Window placement on the other four sides is irregular. The east side still has its original wrought iron fire escape. An additional entrance, to the building's basement, is found on the south side. On the west side, a small jail wing of similar material, built shortly after the completion of the town hall, is the building's only addition.

On the inside, the ground level is of stripped maple with sheet-iron walls and ceiling supported by two rows of cast iron columns. A large metal vault is located under the main stairs, which lead to the auditorium. That takes up two stories leading up to an exposed wooden truss ceiling. The three dormers provide light to the balcony level behind them.

== History ==
Brewster and the area around it grew substantially in the years after the Civil War due to the construction of the New York and Harlem Railroad in 1848. The New York Central Railroad acquired the line in 1864. including within Brewster. In response to this, a Second Empire-style town hall was built on the site in 1869. It burned down on February 23, 1880, when a fire swept the entire south side of Main Street. A replacement was built in 1882, only to meet the same fate in 1893.

Mindful of these two disasters, the current building was designed by the New York City firm of Child & DeGoll to be as fireproof as possible, using less combustible materials like iron and brick. It opened in 1896. Four years later, in 1900, the jail wing was added to the west. That has been the only significant addition or alteration to the building.

The town government remained there until, in 1964, more space became necessary. The town clerk and town supervisor's office were moved to the recently closed First National Bank of Brewster building down the street, near the train station. The Southeast Museum had been established a year earlier, and moved into the vacated theater space on the upper level of the Old Town Hall on July 6, 1963. The Southeast Museum continues to occupy the building to this day, although on the middle level, which originally housed the dancing room, jury room and clerk's room.

In 1977, prior to the building being listed on the Register, extensive renovations were done to bring it back to its original appearance, jointly sponsored by the village of Brewster and the Southeast Museum. Supervising architect Richard Bergmann of New Canaan, Connecticut, relied on the original drawings to guide the restoration. The auditorium's stage was extended 10 feet (3 m) to accommodate the needs of contemporary theatrical productions, and the basement was remodeled to serve as offices for some minor town offices and community organizations, and town court. No other changes were made at that time.

The town's master plan update in 2002 recommended that it take measures to bring the building up to code and otherwise improve it. The town court, especially, was overcrowded. This led to the construction of the current town hall in the mid-2000s and the town's final retreat from its old town hall.
