= French Hill =

French Hill may refer to:

- French Hill (politician) (born 1956), American representative from Arkansas
- French Hill (settlement), in northern East Jerusalem
  - French Hill Depot, Green Line (Jerusalem Light Rail)
- French Hill, Donald J. Trump State Park, New York State

== See also ==
- Category:Hills of France
