= Highbridge Facility =

Railroad maintenance facility in the Bronx, New York

Highbridge
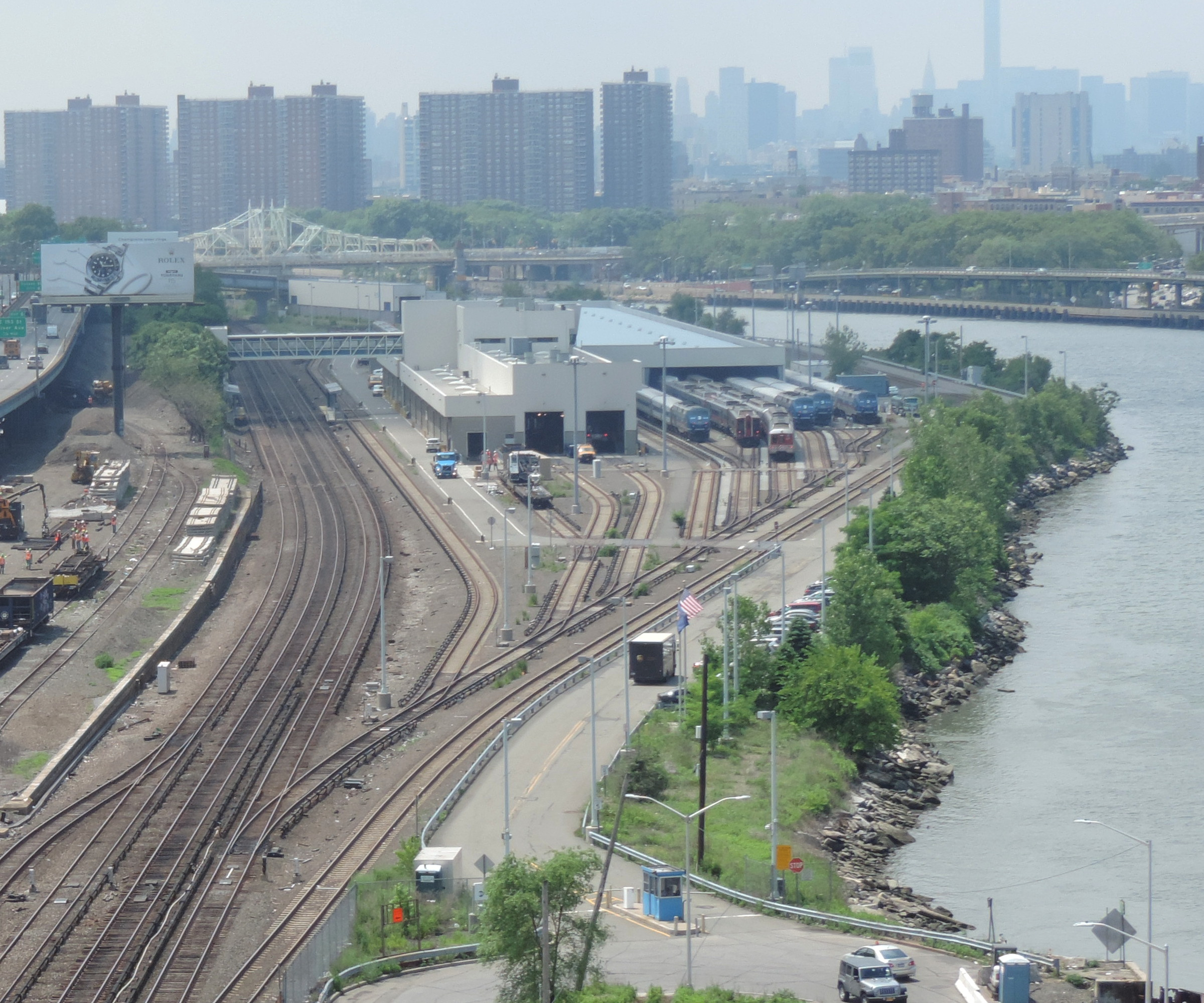
- Highbridge Metro-North Facility, as seen from its namesake

General information
- Location: Depot Place and Exterior Drive; Bronx, New York
- Coordinates: 40°50′17.5″N 73°55′53″W
- Line: Hudson Line
- Platforms: 1 side platform (employees only)
- Tracks: 3 mainline plus 11 yard

History
- Opened: 1871
- Closed: 1973
- Rebuilt: December 2003 (employees only)
- Electrified: 700V (DC) third rail

Former services
Preceding station	New York Central Railroad	Following station
Morris Heights toward Peekskill	Hudson Division	138th Street toward New York
Morris Heights toward Brewster	Putnam Division	Sedgwick Avenue Terminus
Morris Heights toward Brewster	Putnam Division	155th Street (before 1918) Terminus
Location

The Highbridge Facility, also simply known as Highbridge or High Bridge, is a maintenance facility for the Metro-North Railroad in the Highbridge section of the Bronx, New York City, United States. It is the third stop along the Hudson Line north of Grand Central Terminal, and is for Metro-North employees only, though this stop also formerly served commuter rail passengers and was called High Bridge station.

The station is located south of the High Bridge off Depot Place and Exterior Drive, and is accessible from Sedgwick Avenue by way of a viaduct that carries Depot Place over the Major Deegan Expressway, the Hudson Line, and Exterior Drive.

== History and use ==
High Bridge station opened in 1871 when the Spuyten Duyvil and Port Morris Railroad, then owned by the New York Central and Hudson River Railroad, was extended through the West Bronx and along the Harlem River to connect with the Hudson River Railroad. The segment north of Mott Haven Junction became part of the Hudson Division. With the opening of the line, most passenger trains were rerouted into the new Grand Central Depot via that line along the northeast bank of the Harlem River and the New York and Harlem Rail Road, which was also part of the New York Central system. The station served as a transfer point for the Putnam Division of the NYC until service ended on that line in 1958, and the station also served as a change point where electric locomotives were swapped for steam.

The NYCRR's long-distance passenger trains, including the Wolverine, 20th Century Limited, and Lake Shore Limited, picked up their dining cars at High Bridge after leaving Grand Central Terminal, but High Bridge was not an official stop for those trains. The NYCRR also operated a passenger car washing facility on site. High Bridge also had a tractor trailer/freight yard where trucks would load their trailers on to flat cars for "piggyback" service. At one time, the NYCRR also operated transfer bridges that moved freight cars onto barges when the railroad owned its own fleet of tugboats and car floats.

Photographs indicate that trains utilized the Highbridge Station up until at least the 1960s. The passenger station closed due to low ridership in 1973 when the Metropolitan Transportation Authority (MTA) installed high-level platforms at stations in the Bronx. The MTA later demolished the station structure.

Highbridge's freight yard now serves as a maintenance facility for the Metro-North Railroad. In 1998, it was connected to the Oak Point Link via a low viaduct along the east bank of the Harlem River leading to the Harlem River Yards and Oak Point Yard, both of which are freight yards originally owned by the New York, New Haven and Hartford Railroad.

== In popular culture ==
A scene in the movie Funny Girl shows Barbra Streisand riding one of the NYCRR tugs.

== Platform and track configuration ==
1	■ Hudson Line	Passing track
2	■ Hudson Line	Passing track
4	■ Hudson Line	Passing track, no platform here
