= Anderson–Jerome Avenues station =

New York City Subway station in The Bronx (closed 1958)

Anderson–Jerome Avs.
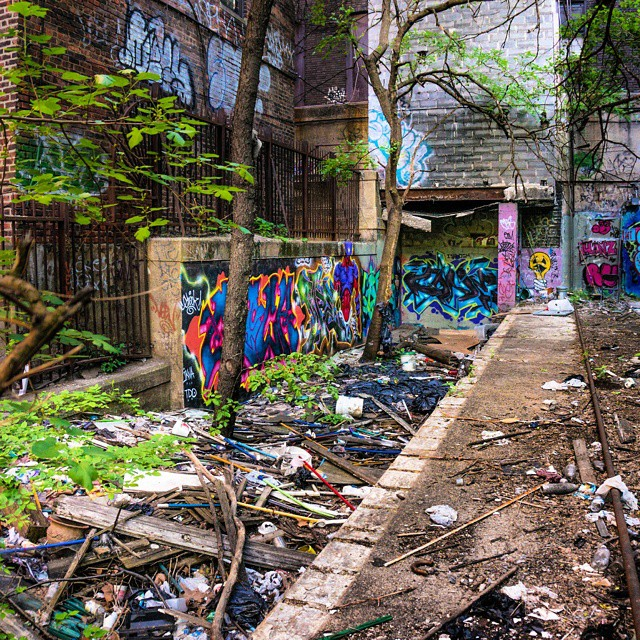
- Platform of the Anderson–Jerome Avenues station

General information
- Location: Highbridge, The Bronx
- Coordinates: 40°49′51″N 73°55′38″W
- System: Former Manhattan Railway elevated station
- Operator: Interborough Rapid Transit Company; City of New York (after 1940)
- Line: IRT Ninth Avenue Line
- Platforms: 1 island platform
- Tracks: 2

History
- Opened: July 1, 1918; 108 years ago
- Closed: August 31, 1958; 68 years ago

Former services
Preceding station	Interborough Rapid Transit	Following station
167th Street toward Burnside Avenue	Ninth Avenue Express	Sedgwick Avenue toward Rector Street
Track layout
Location

The Anderson–Jerome Avenues station was an elevated and partially underground station on the Bronx extension of the IRT Ninth Avenue Line in Highbridge, Bronx, New York City.

== History ==
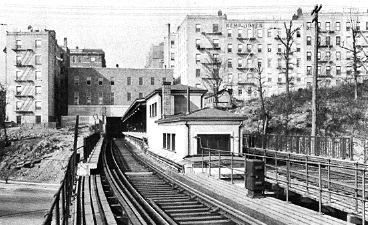
The station in 1918

The station was opened on July 1, 1918, on an extension serving the purpose of connecting the IRT Ninth Avenue Line with the IRT Jerome Avenue Line. Despite the main line's closure in 1940, this station and two others remained open as part of the Polo Grounds Shuttle for baseball fans traveling to the Polo Grounds, but this remaining segment closed on August 31, 1958, after the Giants moved to San Francisco. Although there was discussion to merge this segment with the IRT Lenox Avenue Line, the tunnel from Sedgwick Avenue to Anderson–Jerome Avenues was built to NYC Elevated Railway standards. Those standards specified the clearance between the tracks and the sides of the tunnel only allowed for the "El" type open third rail instead of the covered third rail in use on the IRT Subway. The standard distance from the center of the track to the center of the El type open third rail-head is a few inches shorter than the distance to the subway type covered third rail-head. This incompatibility prevented the line from being used in the future by standard IRT Subway equipment, and brought about the line's demise instead of being linked to the IRT Jerome Avenue Line at 167th Street in the Bronx and the IRT Lenox Avenue Line at Harlem–148th Street in Manhattan, which had been proposed by the New York City Board of Transportation in 1940.

== Description ==
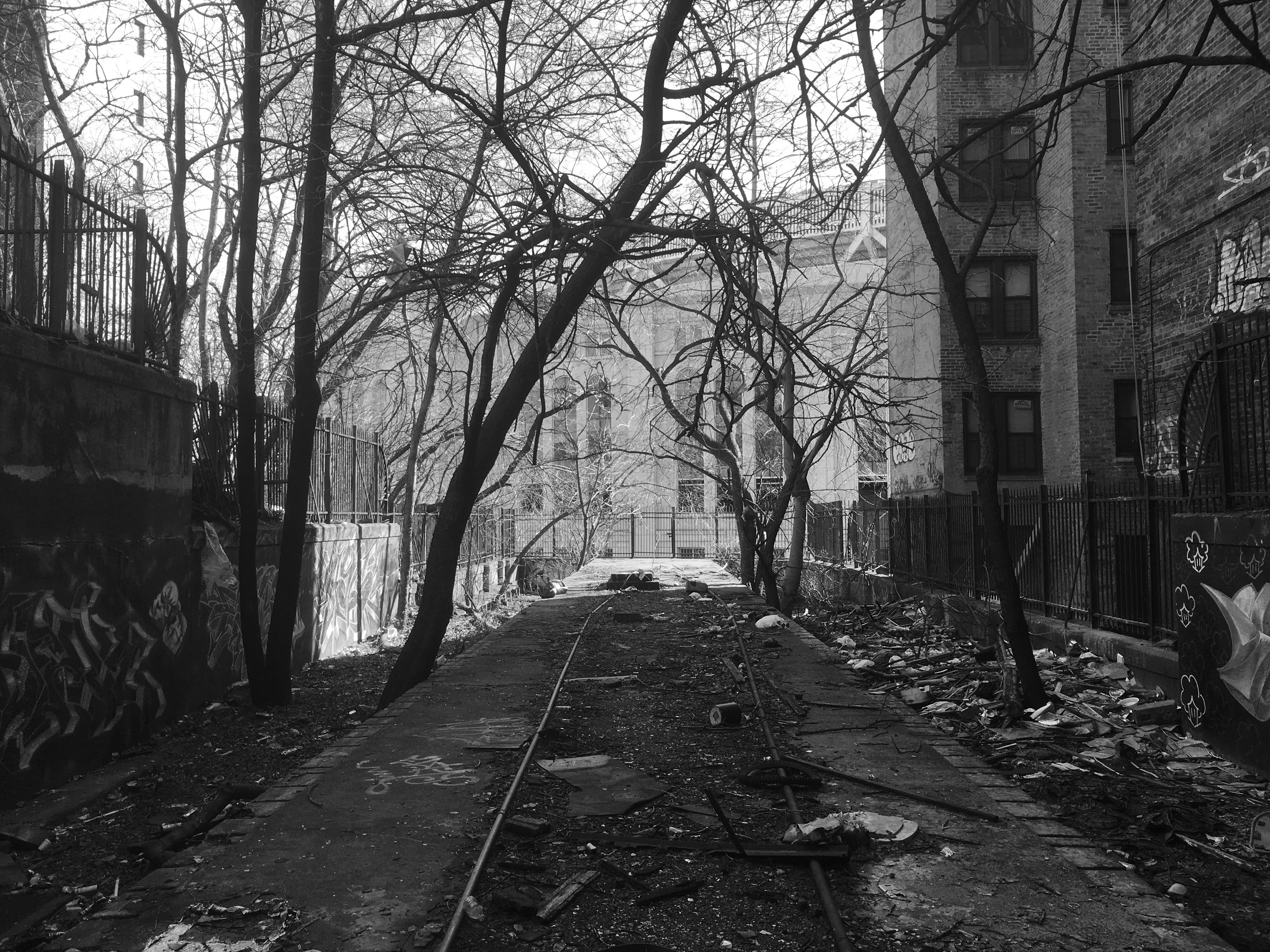
The station in February 2018

The reinforced concrete station structure extended from the end of the tunnel from the Sedgwick Avenue station over Jerome Avenue. The tunnel emerges from the basement of an apartment building on Anderson Avenue. A portion of the island platform is in the tunnel. The station had entrances at each end of the structure on each side of Jerome Avenue and Anderson Avenue. A grate where the main staircase used to go up toward the platform still exists. The entire structure was on a private right-of-way. The tunnel is still intact to this day, but is sealed off.

The structure east of the station was a two track steel structure north of 162nd Street that curved north to ramp up to the IRT Jerome Avenue Line elevated structure on River Avenue. The ramp was integrated with the Jerome Avenue Line structure and a stub of the curve remains, pointing toward the new Yankee Stadium. North of the curve stub, the lower track structures gradually ramp up to the meet the Jerome Avenue mainline from 164th Street and 166th Street; the ramps structures are located between the outer Jerome Avenue local tracks and inner express track. An IRT electric substation is north of the curve stub.

Although the station is no longer accessible, the site is home to many pieces of graffiti. Trash also litters the station and trees are sprouting where the tracks formerly lay. This station used to be accessible, although the route is not intended for use, through the Sedgwick Avenue station. A footbridge connects with an abandoned park, where the tunnel used to be open to urban explorers. Today, however, the entrance is boarded up, and fences are placed with the intention to deter intruders. The building atop which the station sits is still visible at the intersection of East 162nd Street and Jerome Avenue.

== See also ==
- List of closed New York City Subway stations
