= New York and Putnam Railroad =

Former rail line in New York

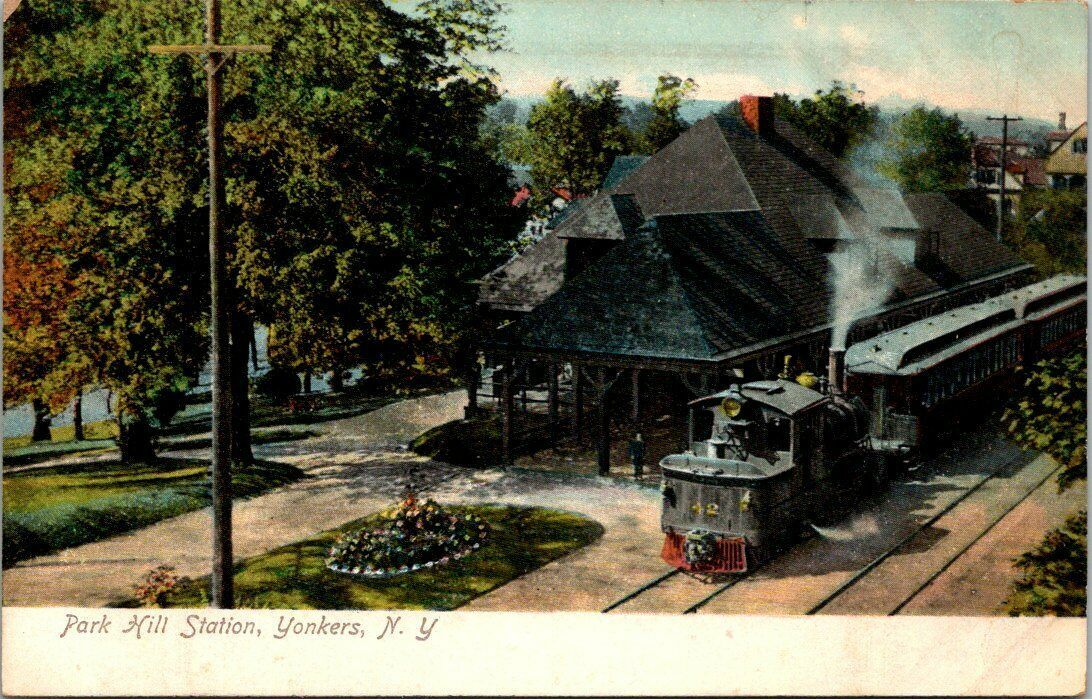
- Postcard of Park Hill station, circa 1907-1915

Overview
- Reporting mark: NYP
- Locale: Manhattan, The Bronx, and Westchester and Putnam Counties, New York
- Dates of operation: 1881; 145 years ago – 1958; 68 years ago
- Successor: New York Central Railroad

Technical
- Track gauge: 4 ft 8 1/2 in (1,435 mm) standard gauge

The New York and Putnam Railroad, nicknamed the Old Put, was a railroad line that opened in 1881 between the Bronx and Brewster in New York State. In 1894, it was acquired by the New York Central system along with the nearby Hudson River Railroad and New York and Harlem Railroad. Starting in 1958, the railroad began to be incrementally abandoned. Today most of its former roadbed has been converted to rail trails.

== History ==
=== Early years, charter ===
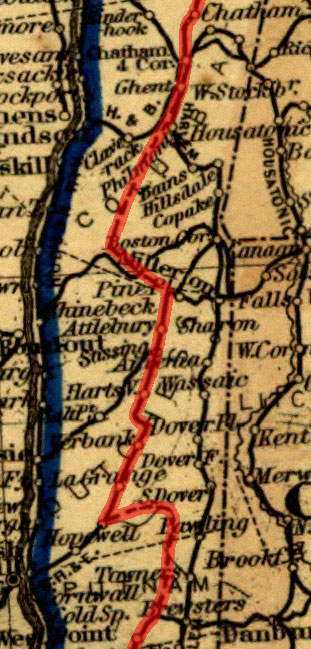
The planned New York, Boston & Montreal Railway route between the New York & Putnam Railroad and the Harlem Extension Railroad

The New York & Boston Railroad (NY&B) was chartered on May 21, 1869 to build a line from Highbridge on the Harlem River in New York northeast to Brewster. At Brewster connections were to be provided to the New York & Harlem Railroad for travel north to Albany, and to the Boston, Hartford & Erie Railroad to Boston. The railway would see several name changes and reorganizations before construction commenced.

The New York, Boston & Northern Railway (NYB&N) was formed on November 18, 1872, as a consolidation of the NY&B with two companies to the north — the Putnam & Dutchess Railroad (P&D) and Dutchess & Columbia Railroad (D&C). The P&D was a plan for a line to split from the New York and Boston at Carmel to a point midway along the D&C. The D&C opened in 1871, running from the Hudson River to the Connecticut border. The Clove Branch Railroad was to serve as a short connection between the two parts of the planned line.

The New York, Boston & Montreal Railway was organized on January 21, 1873, as a renaming of the NYB&N. It continued north to Chatham on what is now the defunct section of the Harlem Line and then used the Harlem Extension Railroad into Vermont. The Panic of 1873 caused the cancellation of the leases and mergers on December 1 of that year. Construction on the P&D and D&C stopped; D&C later became part of the Central New England Railway, the Harlem Extension became a part of the Rutland Railroad, and the Clove Branch Railroad was abandoned in 1898.

The New York, Westchester & Putnam Railway was formed on July 3, 1877, as a reorganization, and was leased to the New York City & Northern Railroad (NYC&N), formed on March 1, 1878. Between East View and Pocantico Hills, the NYC&N built a segment leading to a perilous 80-foot-high trestle over a marsh-filled valley. Because of the dangers of crossing the bridge, which often required that trains slow down to a crawl, the line was rerouted west around that valley in 1881. The bridge was torn down in 1883, and the valley became the Tarrytown Reservoir. The line finally opened under the original plan, ending at Brewster, in April 1881. That year, the New York & New England Railroad opened to the north, using some of the grade built for the P&D and D&C. The West Side & Yonkers Railway was leased to the NYC&N on May 1, 1880, extending the line south across the Harlem River to the northern terminal of the Ninth Avenue Elevated at 155th Street. It was merged into the NYC&N by 1887. In the 1910s, the Interborough Rapid Transit Company (IRT) of the New York City Subway purchased the bridge across the Harlem River to move its elevated lines north into the Bronx, cutting the NYP back to Sedgwick Avenue. The Yonkers Rapid Transit Railway was opened in 1888 as a branch from the NYP at Van Cortlandt northwest to Yonkers. It was merged into NYP by 1887.

=== Reorganization and decline ===
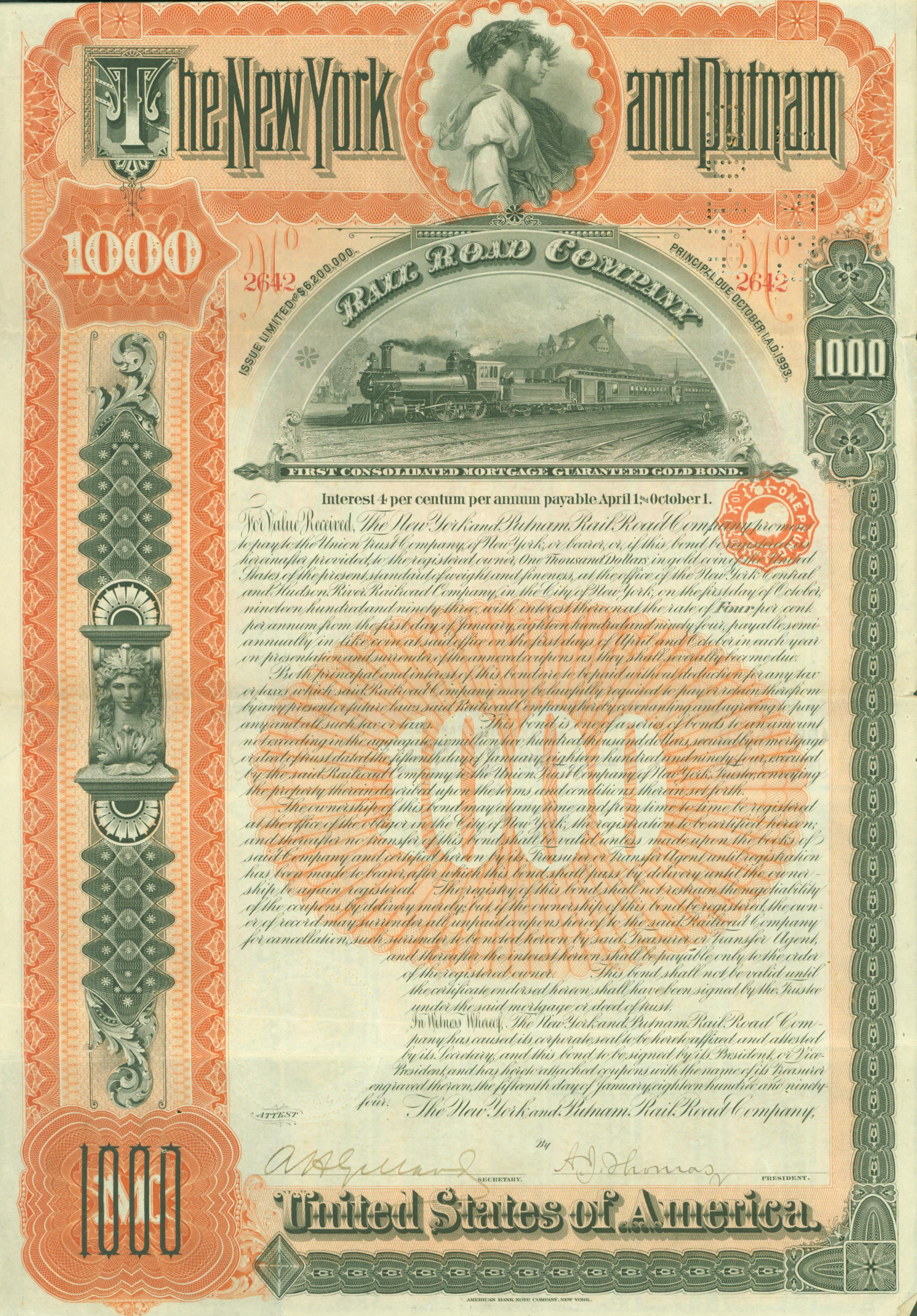
Gold Bond of the New York and Putnam Rail Road Company, issued 15. January 1894

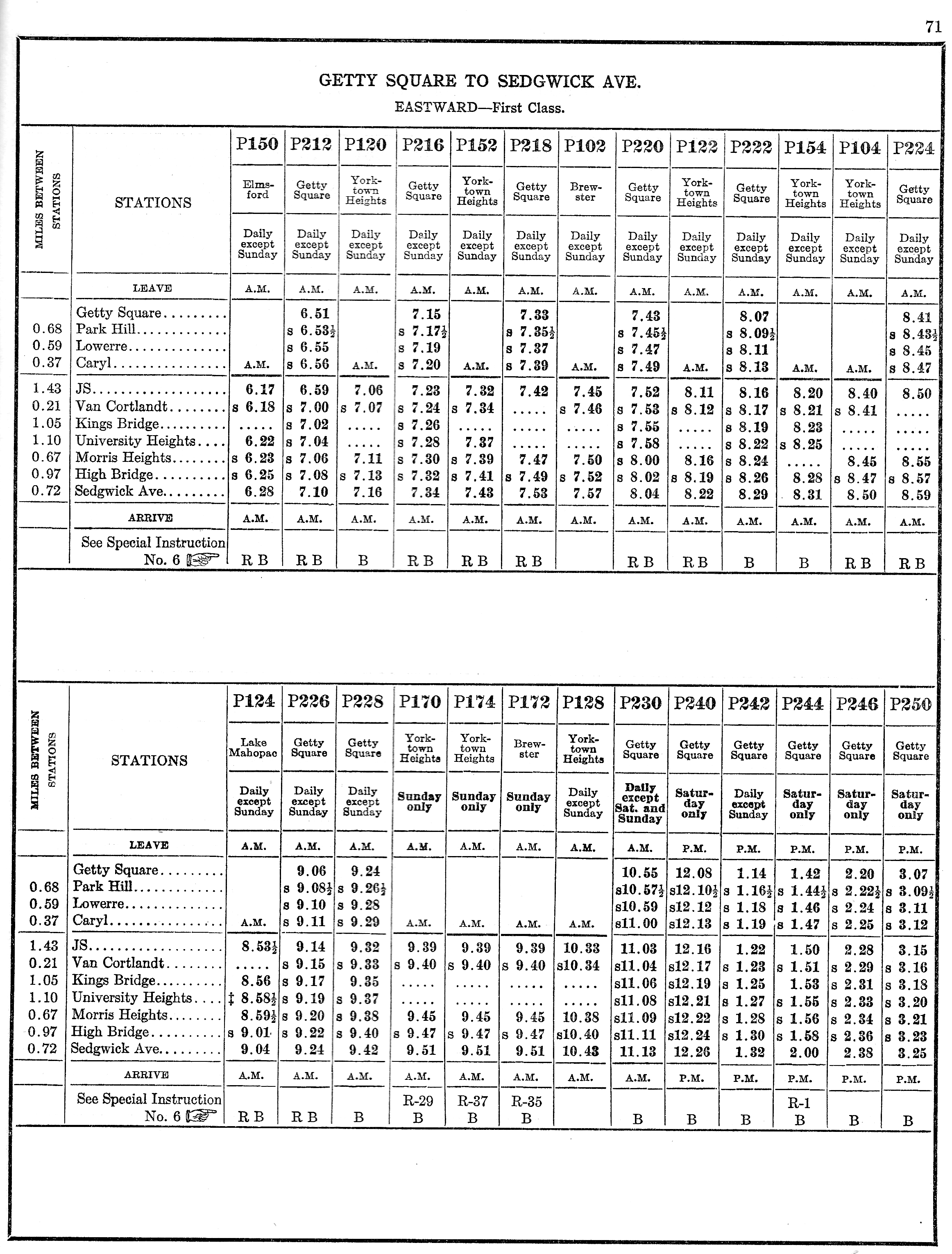
New York Central's Putnam Division, Getty Square branch Southbound (Eastbound) electric schedules from Employee Timetable No. 55 effective 1942-06-07 showing service operated before abandonment on June 30, 1943. Tracks were torn-out in December, 1944, after a legal battle.

The company went into receivership by 1887 and was reorganized as the New York & Northern Railway. By 1894 it was reorganized as the New York & Putnam Rail Road Company (NY&P) by J. P. Morgan, who in turn leased the railroad to the New York Central & Hudson River Railroad (NYC&HR). The line eventually became the Putnam Division of the New York Central Railroad (NYC) by 1913. The line lacked a direct connection to NYC's flagship station, Grand Central Terminal (GCT), which hurt ridership throughout its existence. Workweek commuters and weekend tourists were forced to transfer at Highbridge to reach GCT. The Sedgwick Avenue-Van Cortlandt section and the Yonkers Branch were electrified in 1926.

Several short branches were eliminated after the 1920s. The Mohansic Branch near Yorktown Heights, originally built to serve a mental institution that was canceled by the Government of New York State, went first. In 1929, John D. Rockefeller Jr. had the tracks removed from his Pocantico Hills property, eliminating four stations while creating one. The nearby village of East View was obliterated to build the new line. The Getty Square Branch was abandoned on June 30, 1943. Despite a legal battle by Yonkers residents which reached the United States Supreme Court to save it, the line was scrapped in December 1944.

Besides the regular Sedgwick Avenue–Brewster service, service also operated from Golden's Bridge on the Harlem Division via a connecting branch to Lake Mahopac, and then over the Putnam Division to Brewster, where it returned to the Harlem Division. Trains taking this route were said to go "around the horn".

=== End of service ===
The Putnam Division lacked a second track, electrification, commuter parking and direct service to GCT, all of which the parallel Harlem and Hudson Divisions had, resulting in declining patronage. In 1956, the New York Central asked for permission to discontinue service on the line. On May 14, 1957, the Public Service Commission allowed a 15 percent increase in fares, but required that service be run on the Putnam Division on a limited basis. On March 12, 1958, the Public Service Commission authorized the NYC to end passenger service on the Putnam on June 1, 1958. At the time, the line had less than 500 daily riders, and discontinuing the line was expected to save $400,000 annually. The last trains ran on May 29, 1958, as there was no weekend service on the line. Service "around the horn" via the Harlem Division's Lake Mahopac Branch continued until April 2, 1959. Until 1962, when NYC's West Shore Railroad was upgraded, the Putnam served oversize freight trains, due to the lack of tunnels on the line. Tracks between East View and Lake Mahopac began to be removed in 1962.

The NYC merged with long-time rival Pennsylvania Railroad to form Penn Central (PC) in 1968. Freight service on the northern part of the Putnam ended in March 1970. The southern end of the line remained in service until the closing of the A&P warehouse in Elmsford, in 1975. The decrease in traffic from Stauffer Chemical cut back the line to Chauncey by 1977. Conrail took over the bankrupt PC in April 1976, but had no plans for increasing business. The last customer was the Stella D'Oro bakery in the Bronx, which stopped using the railroad in 1989, after which Conrail wanted to sell the right-of-way to the city and Westchester to reduce its tax bill.

In 1991, the Regional Plan Association proposed extending the line and connecting it with the IRT Broadway–Seventh Avenue Line (1 train) of the New York City Subway.

== Legacy ==
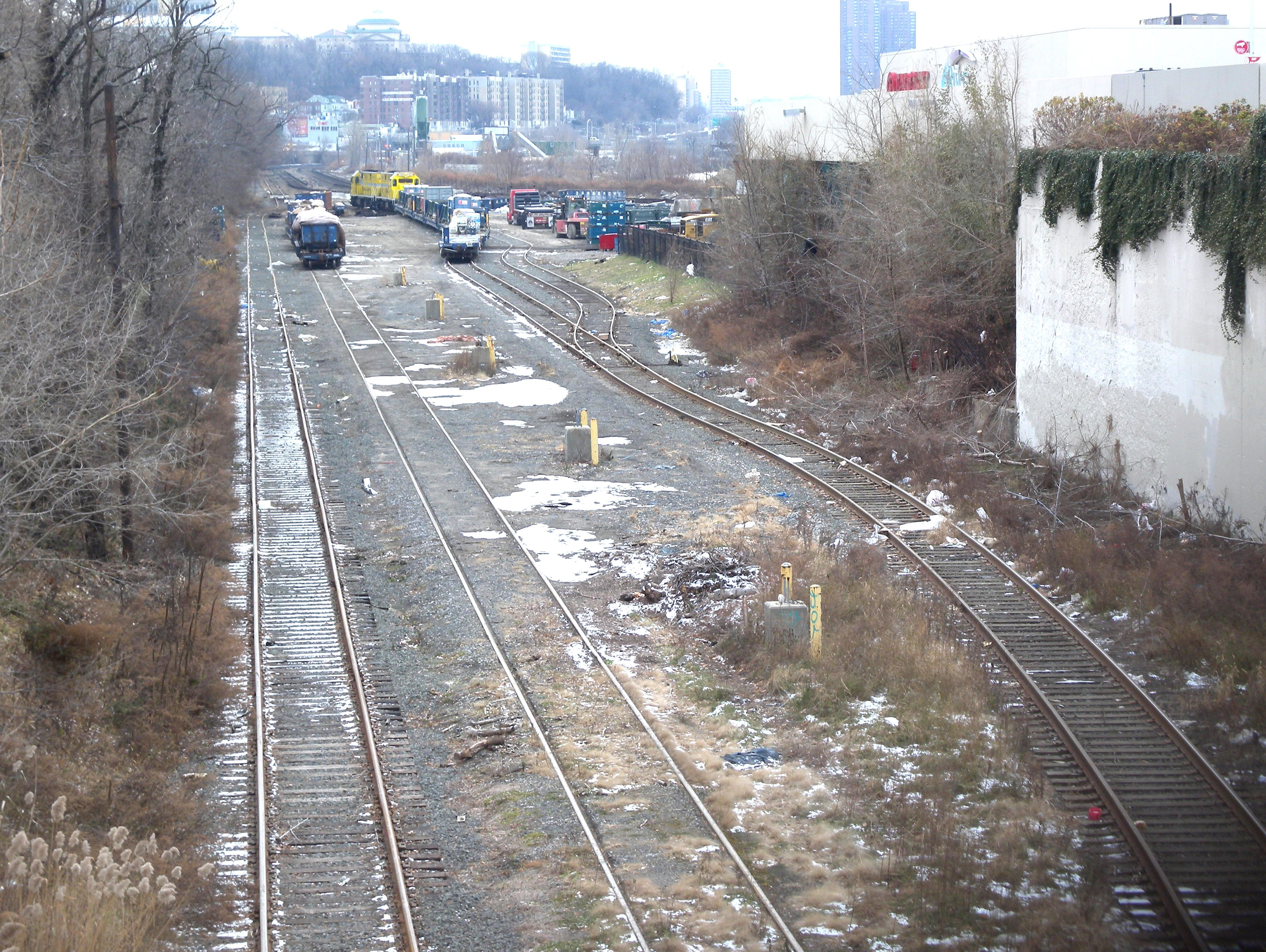
Marble Hill stub in Manhattan

The Metro-North Railroad uses the remaining stub near Marble Hill station to store maintenance-of-way and contractors' trains, and for material delivery in the vicinity of West 225th Street. The roadbed north of the former Van Cortlandt station has been converted into the Putnam Greenway, South County Trailway, North County Trailway, and Putnam County Trailway rail trails.

=== Remaining stations ===
A pseudo replica of the former Bryn Mawr Park station at the former Palmer Road grade crossing is in use as a grocery. The station in Briarcliff Manor was purchased by the village in 1959 and converted into the Briarcliff Manor Public Library. The station in Millwood remained until 2012, but it was torn down in May 2012 due to structural instability. The station in Elmsford serves as a restaurant. The Yorktown Heights station had its exterior restored and is the centerpiece of the town park. The station in Lake Mahopac has been an American Legion Hall since 1965. The freight house in Baldwin Place and the station in Tilly Foster remain but are on private property. Skeletal remnants of the Van Cortlandt station remain in Van Cortlandt Park.

=== Getty Square Branch ===
The Getty Square Branch still shows evidence of its existence, with vestiges of the railroad and stations, and neighborhoods exhibiting characteristics of transit-oriented development. Getty Square station, originally a head house and train shed, was replaced by an office building, which still stands and is ornamented on its exterior and in its lobby with images of locomotives. The 3.4-mile-long (5.5 km) right-of-way is part of the trail system in Van Cortlandt Park, including the bridge that carried the branch over the Henry Hudson Parkway. Old railroad ties can be found along the right-of-way. The right-of-way within New York City ends at a parking garage for an apartment building in Yonkers. To the north of the apartment building, another parking lot was built. The bridge over the adjacent street was walled-in where the ROW used to pass underneath.

Abutments of the former branch can be found at School Street across from Herriott Street, McLean Avenue near South Broadway, and the former Lowerre Station on Lawrence Street at Western Avenue. The former Caryl Station on Caryl Avenue between Saratoga and Van Cortlandt Park Avenues, with the tunnel into Van Cortlandt Park walled-off by cinder blocks, is now the Caryl parking lot and playground. A lot of the intrusions on the branch were from the expansion of outside storage from adjacent industries, which broke up the right-of-way in many places, especially in Yonkers.

Private homes that once served the branch include the termini houses of the Park Hill station's adjacent funicular, on Undercliff at Park Hill Terrace, and on Alta Avenue north of Overcliff, and the home of the railroad's president, also on Alta Avenue. North from the Yonkers-New York City boundary, the path of the route generally follows the path of the Saw Mill River Parkway until it reaches East Irvington.

== Image gallery ==
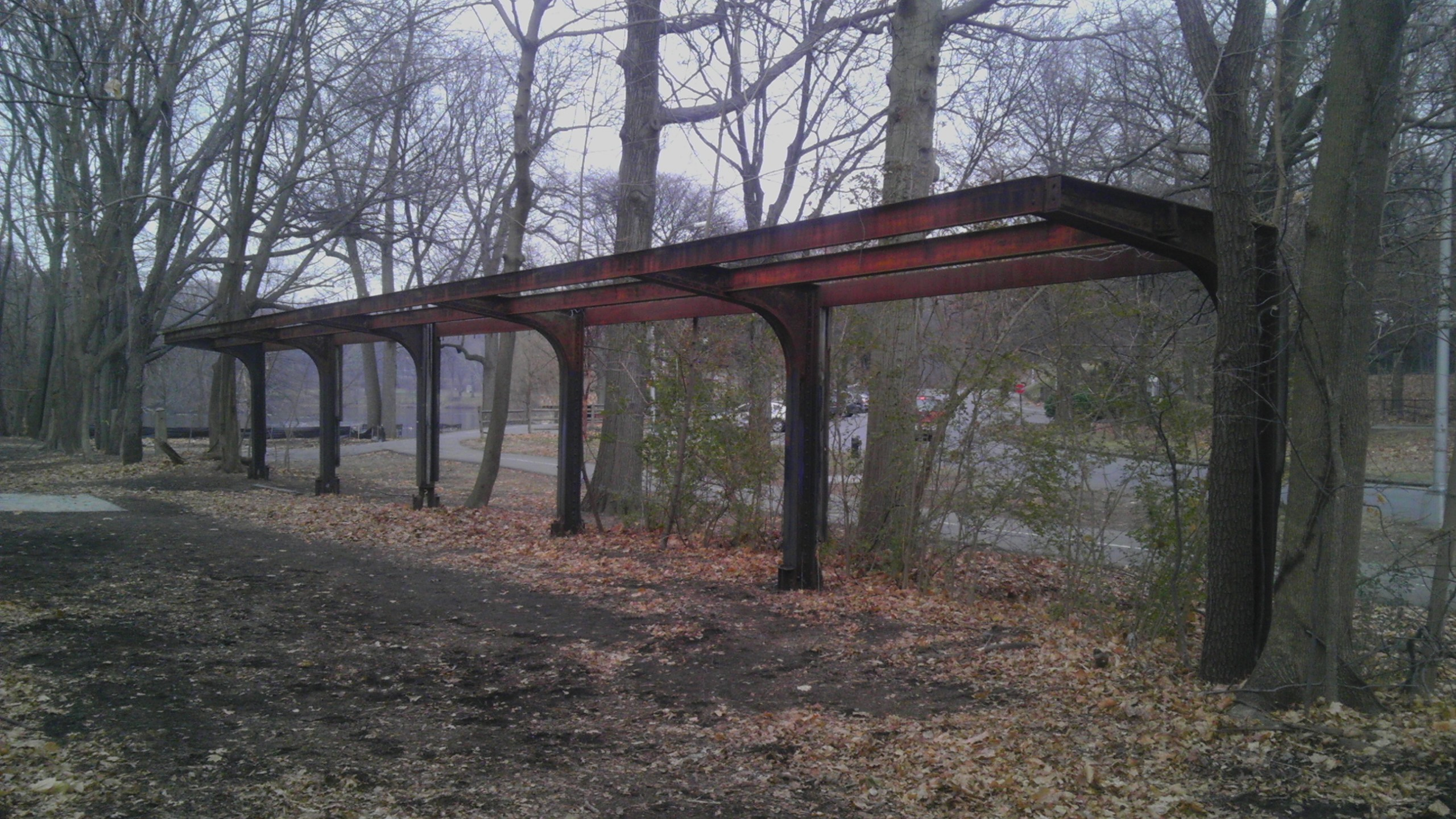
Skeletal remains of Van Cortlandt station in Van Cortlandt Park

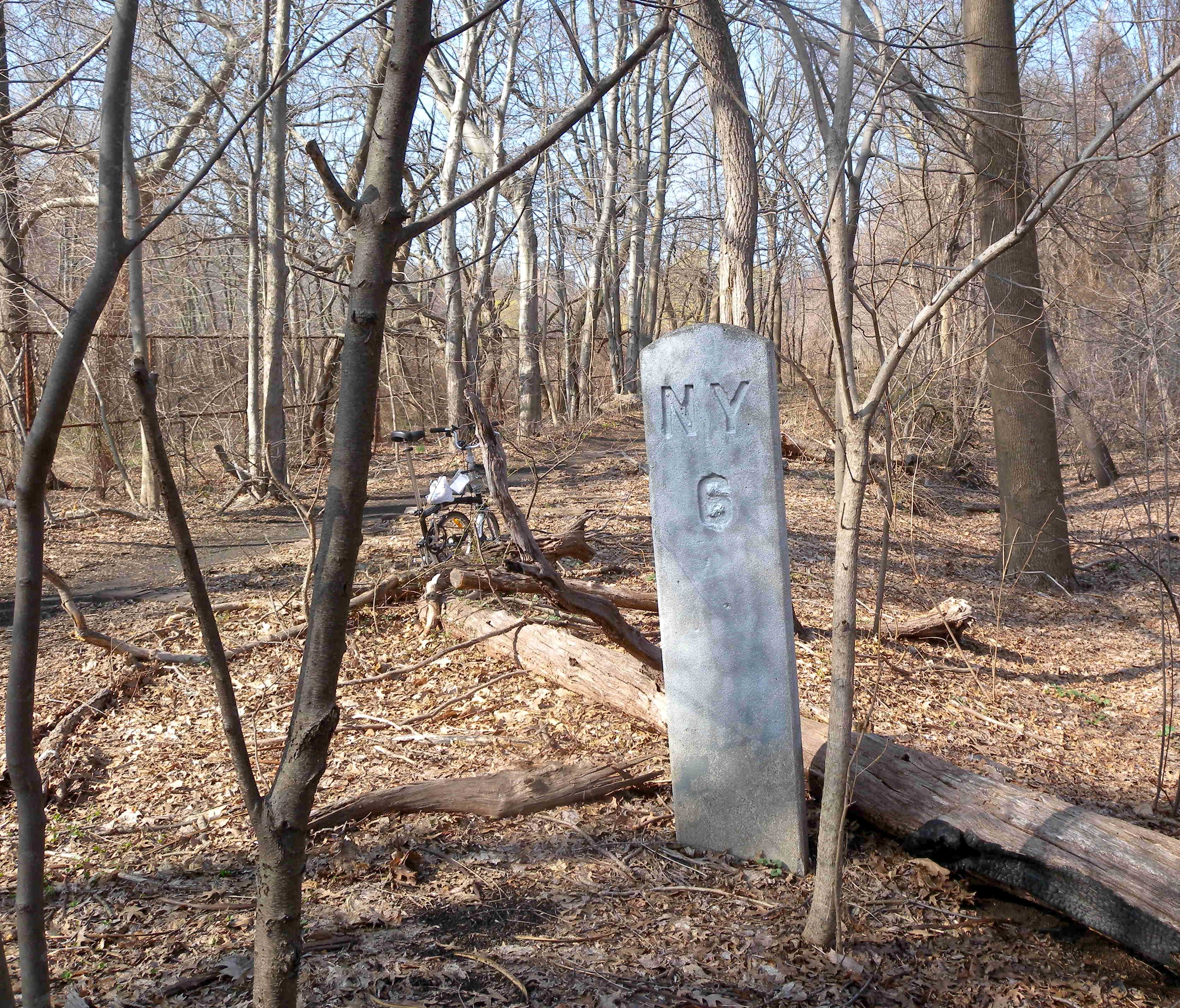
Milepost 6 located in Van Cortlandt Park; former railbed on left

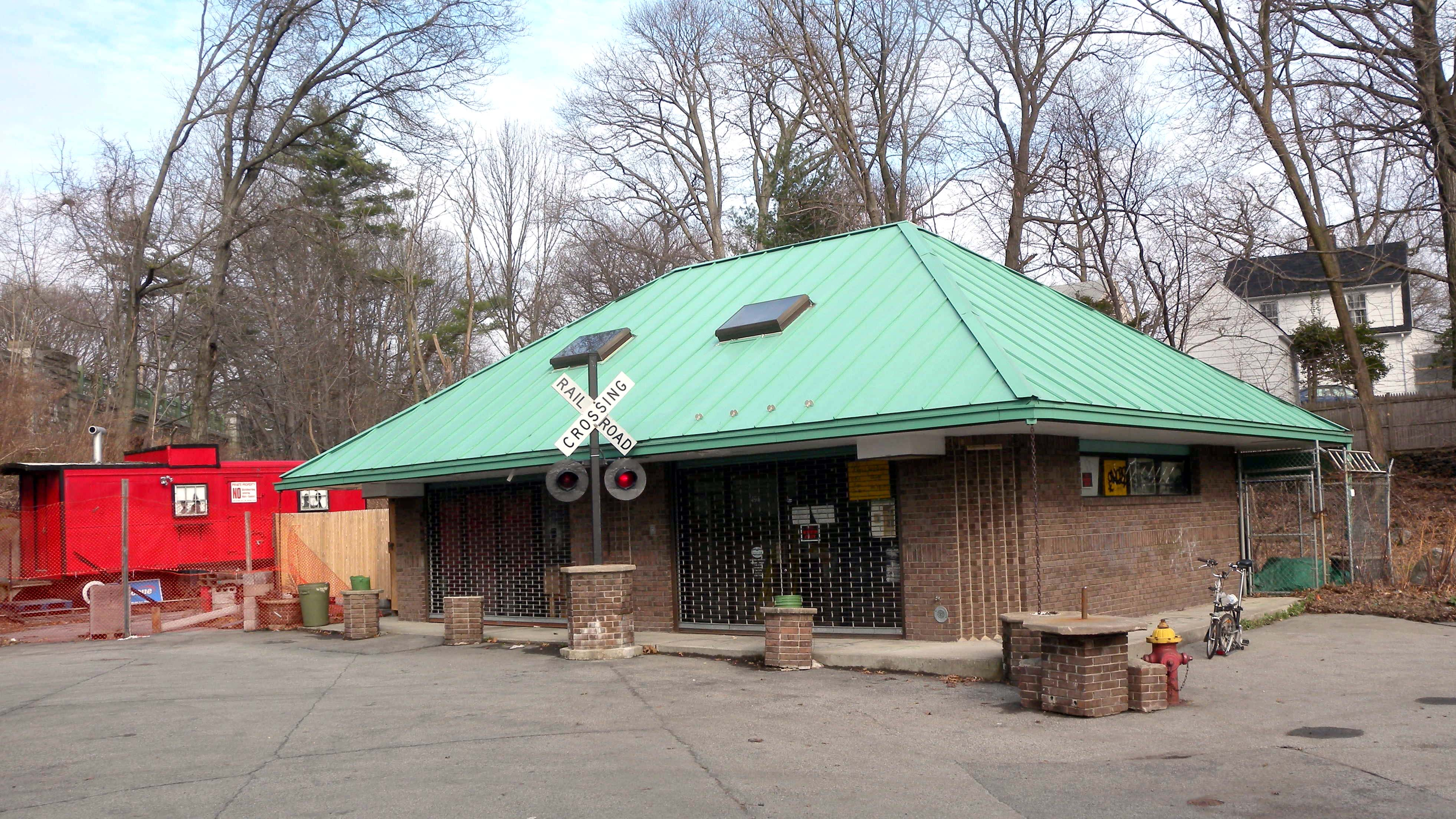
Bryn Mawr Park station replica in 2007

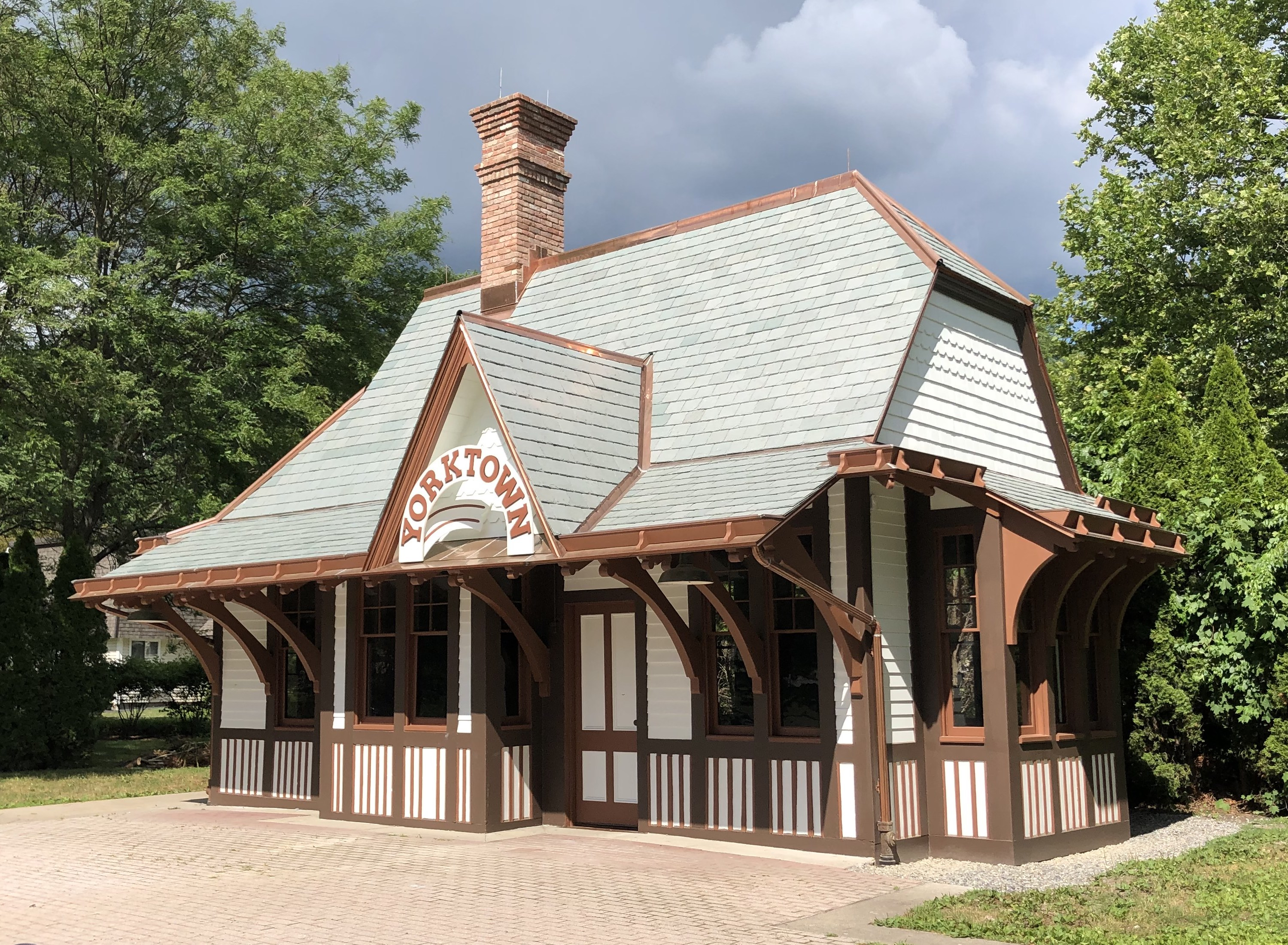
Yorktown Heights station, listed on National Register of Historic Places

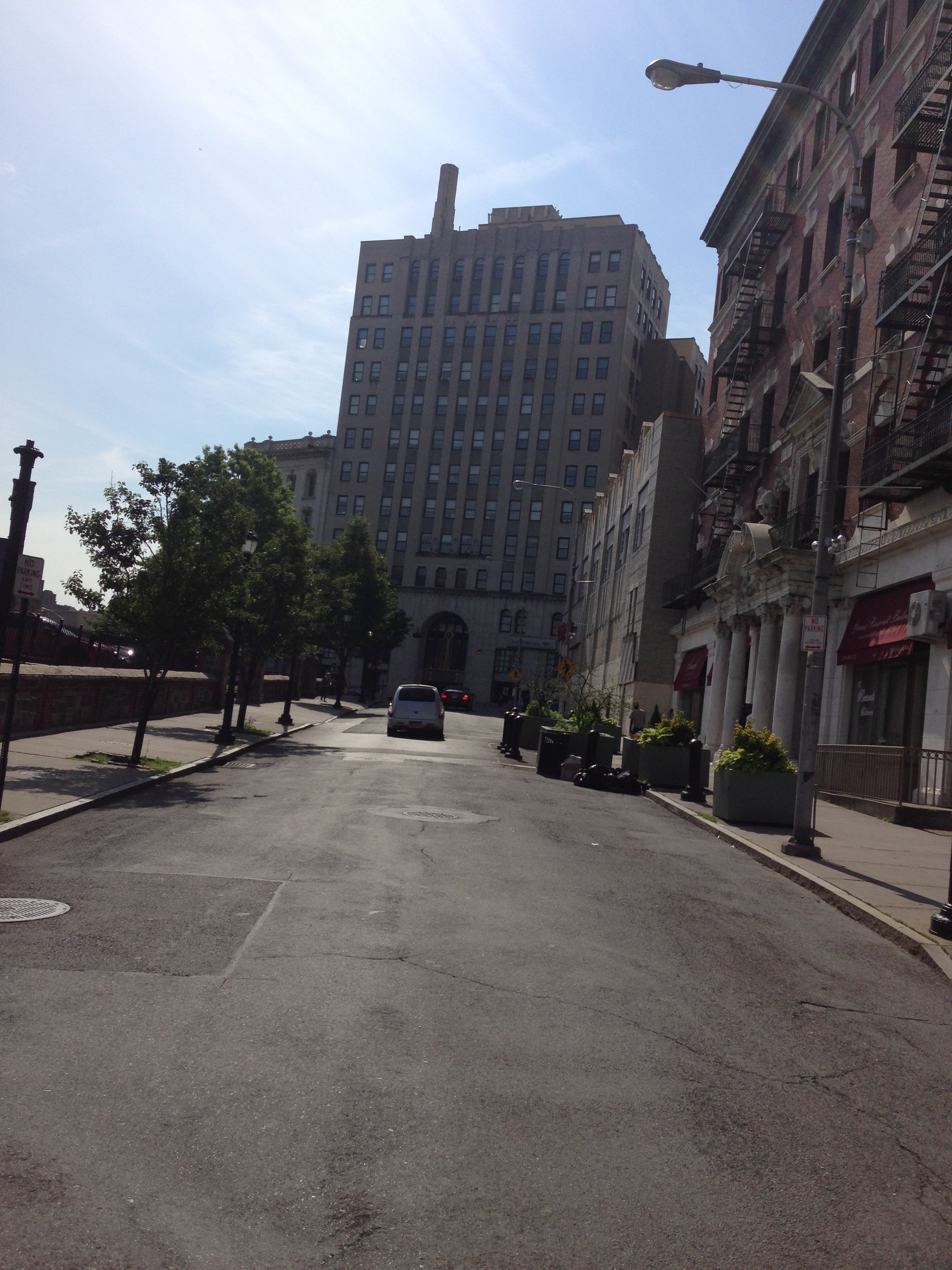
Getty Square Terminus Station Building, 20 South Broadway, Yonkers, NY

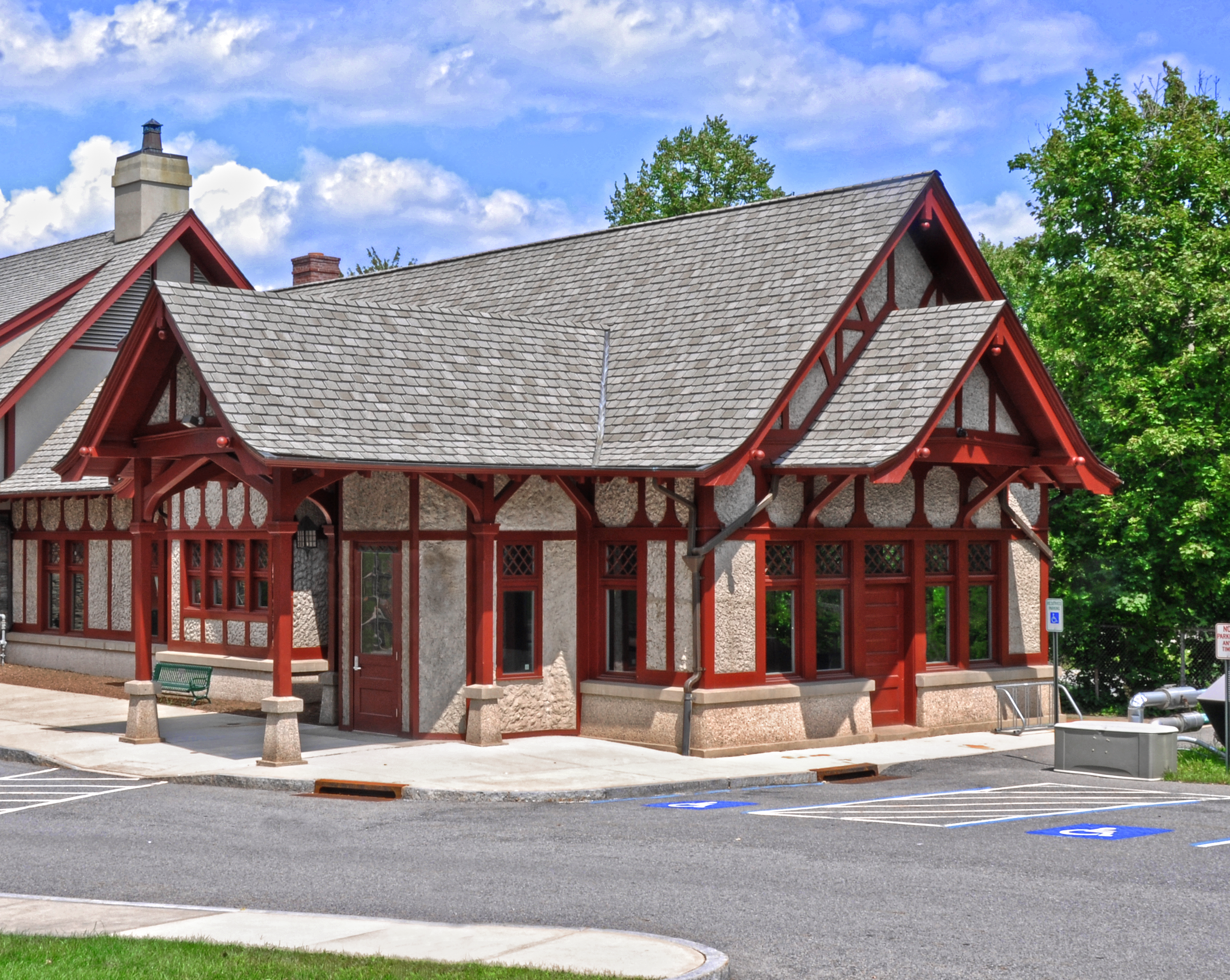
The Briarcliff Manor station, now part of the village library

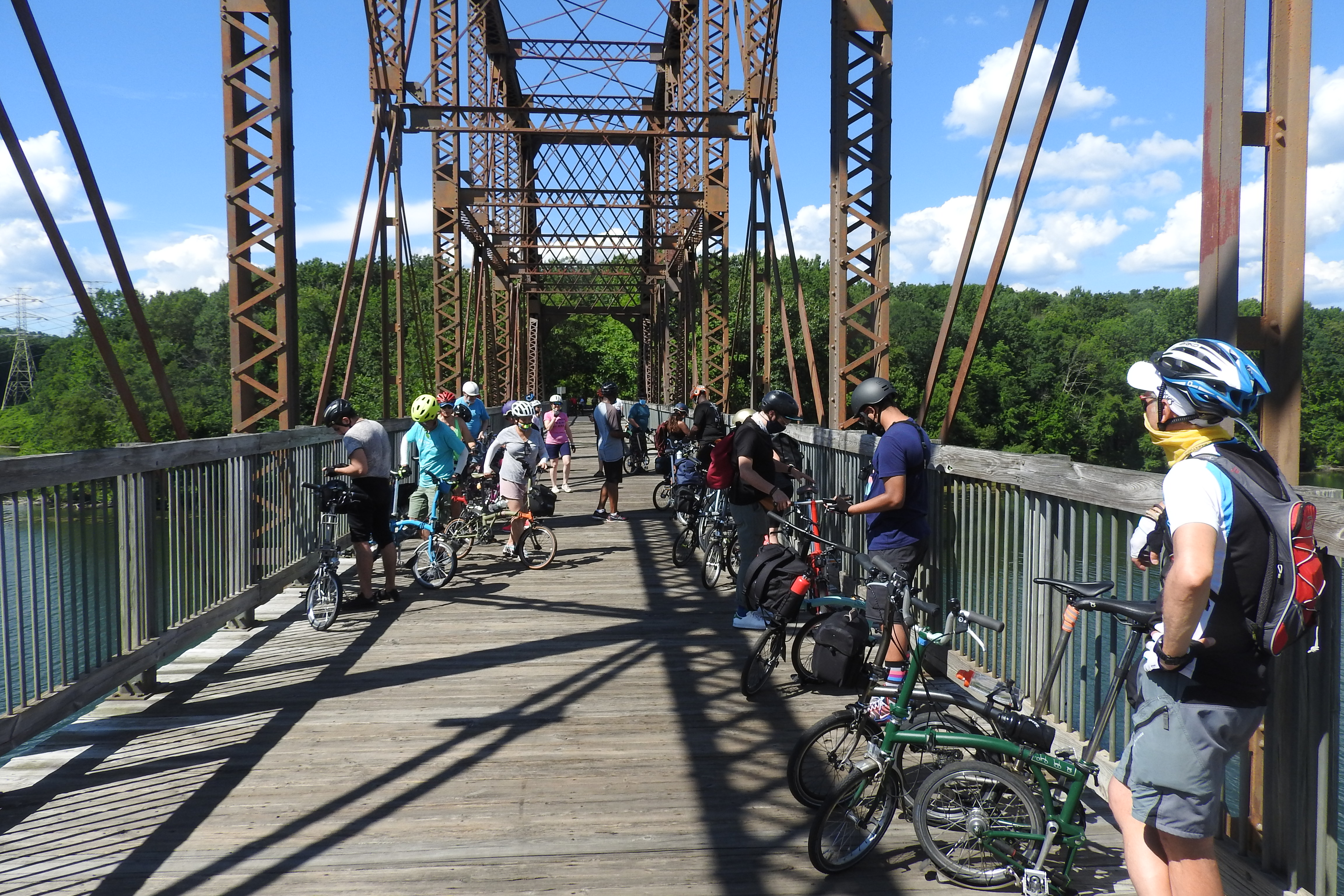
Bridge over New Croton Reservoir

== Station listing ==
Map of the New York and Putnam with sections labelled by the first companies to operate the line

=== Main Line ===
NOTE: Stations along pre-1918 Manhattan terminus and pre-1931 Tarrytown Heights alignment are shaded in darker gray.

Locality	Milepost	Station	Lat/long	Notes/Connections
Manhattan		155th Street Terminal		Original terminal from 1881 to 1918.
Putnam Bridge across the Harlem River; taken over by IRT Ninth Avenue Line in 1918
The Bronx	0.0	Sedgwick Avenue	40°49′53.12″N 73°55′56.15″W	NYC Transit: Connected to former IRT Ninth Avenue Line station and West Side/High Line
The Bronx		Highbridge	40°50′17.5″N 73°55′53″W	Now the Highbridge Maintenance Facility.
The Bronx		Morris Heights	40°51′14.4″N 73°55′11.64″W	
The Bronx		University Heights	40°51′41.04″N 73°54′52.92″W	
The Bronx		Fordham Heights		Merged with University Heights Station in early 20th Century
The Bronx	Hudson & Putnam Lines split			
The Bronx		Kings Bridge		Somewhere between 225th Street and 231st Street; Not to be confused with the Spuyten Duyvil and Port Morris Railroad station of the same name.
The Bronx	4.82	Van Cortlandt	40°53′20.7″N 73°53′36.9″W	Inside Van Cortlandt Park
Junction with electrified Getty Square Branch
Westchester	6.52	Lincoln		at McLean Avenue
Westchester	8.09	Dunwoodie		At Yonkers Avenue east of Dunwoodie Golf Course
Westchester	9.44	Bryn Mawr Park	40°56.6905′0″N 73°51.4825′0″W	Replaced in 1995 by Palmer/Bryn Mawr Market
Westchester	10.50	Nepperham		
Westchester	11.92	Gray Oaks		
Westchester	12.01	Nepera Park		
Westchester	13.02	Mount Hope		
Westchester	13.86	Chauncey		
Westchester	14.72	Ardsley		Off NY 9A between Saw Mill River Parkway and New York State Thruway.
Westchester		Woodlands		Small wooden platform and opened shelter with canopy along Woodlands Lake.
Westchester	16.60	Worthington		Current day bike path does not pass the station location. Station looked similar to Crafts station.
Westchester	18.14	Elmsford	41°03′16″N 73°49′14″W	Currently a restaurant
Westchester		Beaver Hill		Wooden shelter designed as a flag stop for former Fairview Golf Club
Westchester	Original alignment from short-lived 80-foot high Eastview Trestle segment began here (1880–1881).			
Westchester	20.41	Eastview	41°04′50″N 73°49′45″W	Original pre-1929 relocation line began here.
Westchester		Tarrytown Heights		Built March 1882; First station along Tarrytown Heights alignment west of East View station and original NY&P alignment
Westchester		Tower Hill		Built November 26, 1881; Second station on former alignment west of Tarrytown Reservoir existed here until 1931
Westchester		Pocantico Hills		Built November 26, 1881; Third station along former alignment near Rockefeller Estate and Tarrytown Reservoir existed here until 1931
Westchester	Original alignment from short-lived 80-foot high Eastview Trestle segment ended here (1880–1881).			
Westchester		Whitsons		Fourth station along previous alignment. Replaced in 1931 by Graham station on new alignment
Westchester	23.92	Graham		Created by 1931 relocation, Original pre-1929 alignment ended just north of here. Open shelter that was proposed for major expansion which never occurred.
Westchester	27.04	Briarcliff Manor	41°08′48″N 73°49′28″W	Currently the Briarcliff Manor Public Library.
Westchester	30.44	Millwood	41°11′24.3126″N 73°47′48.9942″W	
Westchester	32.52	Kitchawan		Station agent eliminated in 1958
Westchester	33.57	Croton Lake		
Westchester	35.04	Croton Heights		
Westchester	36.76	Yorktown Heights	41°16′17.5″N 73°46′47″W	At Railroad Park on the National Register of Historic Places. Originally contained a coach yard and an engine service facility.
Westchester	Connection to Mohansic Branch			
Westchester	37.94	Amawalk	41.2864°N 73.7703°W	Amawalk's station agent was eliminated on February 8, 1935.
Westchester	39.96	Granite Springs		
Putnam	42.25	Baldwin Place	41.34535°N 73.75453°W	
Putnam	Connection to Mahopac Mines Branch			
Putnam	44.38	Lake Mahopac	41.371440°N 73.734583°W	Currently an American Legion Hall
Putnam	Connection to Lake Mahopac Branch and NYC's Harlem Division			
Putnam	45.13	Mahopac	41.3787°N 73.7241°W	
Putnam	47.20	Crafts		
Putnam	49.58	Carmel		Southern terminus of unbuilt Putnam & Dutchess Railroad.
Putnam	51.84	Tilly Foster		Originally built for the Tilly Foster Mine, which closed in 1897. Station continued to operate.
Putnam	53.82	Putnam Junction		Not a station, connection with Harlem Division and Brewster Yard; included bridge to Beacon Line (a.k.a. CNE Highland Division) until 1907.
Putnam		Brewster	41°23′40.92″N 73°37′11.28″W	
Line continues along NYC's Harlem Division

=== Branches ===
==== Getty Square Branch ====
Locality	Milepost	Station	Lat/long	Notes/Connections
The Bronx	0.0	Van Cortlandt	40°53′28.185″N 73°53′31.649″W	Beginning of Getty Square Branch
The Bronx	Putnam & Getty Square Branches split			
The Bronx		Mosholu		Abandoned 1926
Yonkers		Caryl		North of Caryl Avenue Bridge, which still exists today.
Yonkers		Lowerre		South of Lawrence Street between Western and Van Cortlandt Park Avenues.
Yonkers	3.0	Park Hill		Connected to former Park Hill Incline funicular railroad
Yonkers	3.2	Getty Square		
Line abandoned in 1943

==== Mohansic Branch ====
Locality	Milepost	Station	Lat/long	Notes/Connections
Westchester	0.0	Yorktown Heights	41°16′17.5″N 73°46′47″W	
Westchester	Putnam Line & Mohansic Branch split			
Westchester		Mohansic State Hospital	N.A.	Never built. Branch was abandoned when the hospital project was cancelled before station was constructed.
Line abandoned in 1917

==== Mahopac Mines Branch ====
Locality	Milepost	Station	Lat/long	Notes/Connections
Putnam	0.0	Baldwin Place	41.34535°N 73.75453°W	
Putnam	Putnam & Mahopac Mines Lines split			
Putnam		Mahopac Falls	41.3708°N 73.7621°W	
Putnam	4.0	Mahopac Mines	41.3974°N 73.7584°W	Seldom used by customers. Also had a turn table and water tower.
Line abandoned in 1931

==== Lake Mahopac Branch ====
Locality	Milepost	Station	Lat/long	Notes/Connections
Putnam	0.0	Lake Mahopac	41.371440°N 73.734583°W	Putnam Division connection
Putnam	0.40	XC		Unmanned junction where the Lake Mahopac Branch crossed the Putnam Division.
Westchester	3.00	Shenorock	41.3361°N 73.7367°W	Flag stop, 9/10 mile west of Lincolndale.
Westchester	3.91	Lincolndale	41.323715°N 73.719014°W	Stone station building.
Westchester	7.22	Golden's Bridge	41.294491°N 73.677568°W	Harlem Division connection
Line abandoned in 1959

== See also ==
- New York Central Railroad
