= Putnam Bridge (New York City) =

Railroad bridge (1881–1958)

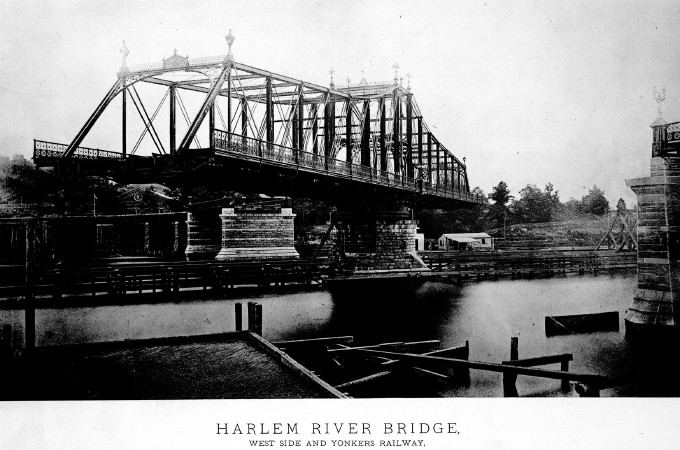
- Coordinates: 40°49′56″N 73°56′04″W
- Carries: Putnam Division (1881–1918); 9th Avenue El (1918–1940); Polo Grounds Shuttle (1940–1958)
- Crosses: Harlem River
- Locale: Manhattan and the Bronx, New York City

Characteristics
- Design: Swing bridge
- Total length: 1,004.4 feet (306.1 m)
- Width: 40 feet (12.19 m) including walkways
- Longest span: 297 ft 8 3/8 in (90.74 m)
- Clearance below: 28 feet (8.53 m)

History
- Opened: May 1, 1881
- Closed: August 31, 1958

Location
- Interactive map of Putnam Bridge

The Putnam Bridge was a swing bridge that spanned the Harlem River and the adjacent tracks of the New York Central Railroad in New York City. The bridge connected Harlem in Manhattan to Concourse, near the current location of Yankee Stadium, in the Bronx. It carried two tracks of the New York and Putnam Railroad, and later the 9th Avenue elevated line of the Interborough Rapid Transit Company (IRT), as well as two pedestrian walkways outside the superstructure.

The bridge opened to rail and pedestrian traffic on May 1, 1881, and operated until all rail service was discontinued on August 31, 1958. The bridge's extreme narrowness of 26 feet (7.9 m) between the centers of the trusses, combined with the proximity of the Macombs Dam Bridge, made it impractical and unnecessary to convert to a roadway bridge, and it was removed in 1960.

== Design ==
As with the other Harlem River swing bridges, the bridge was designed by Chief Engineer Alfred Pancoast Boller; the contractors were Clarke, Reeves & Co., and Smith, Ripley & Co. The bridge's total length was 1,004.4 feet (306.1 m), comprising a main span of 300 feet (91 m) (the largest double-track draw span in the world at the time of construction), two identical deck truss side spans of 100 feet (30 m) each, and four approach spans on either side. When closed, the bridge provided 28 feet (8.5 m) of vertical clearance, and when opened, two shipping channels of 124 feet (38 m) and 123 feet (37 m) in the east and west channels respectively.

== Construction ==
The Putnam Bridge was built by the New York City & Northern Railroad, a predecessor of the NY&P, and operated by its subsidiary, the West Side & Yonkers Railway (not to be confused with the West Side & Yonkers Patent Railway, the original operator of the 9th Avenue line). The location for the bridge was formally approved by the Board of Parks Commissioners on January 7, 1880. Construction was authorized by the Board of Rapid Transit Commissioners on February 18, 1880, was underway by April of that year, and completed April 28, 1881; train service began running on the following Sunday, May 1. Construction was disrupted by an accident on November 26, 1880, when a truss that was being moved into position flipped over unexpectedly, knocked a second truss loose, and caused both to fall through the scaffolding, killing one laborer and injuring four others, but otherwise proceeded without notable incident.

== Service ==
The NY&P and its successor, the New York Central Railroad's Putnam Division, continued to run trains over the bridge until January 6, 1918, at which time service was cut back to a new terminal at Sedgwick Avenue, on the Hudson Division's right of way in the Bronx, and the northward-curving structure connecting the east end of the bridge to the Hudson Division was demolished. The IRT, which by then had taken over operation of the 9th Avenue El from the Manhattan Railway Company, reconfigured the 155th Street terminal to allow elevated trains direct access to the bridge, and on the Bronx side of the river constructed a new right-of-way, partially elevated and partially in tunnel, eastward from the bridge to a connection with the new Jerome Avenue elevated line at 162nd Street. Through service over this new line to the 167th Street station was inaugurated July 1 of that year, and extended to the northern terminus at Woodlawn by January 2, 1919.

Train service on the 9th Avenue El south of 155th Street was discontinued June 12, 1940, on the occasion of the City of New York assuming operation of the IRT; nevertheless, the segment crossing the bridge continued to be operated between 155th Street in Manhattan and 167th Street in the Bronx, as a shuttle serving the Polo Grounds. However, the New York Giants baseball team was moved from the Polo Grounds to San Francisco after the 1957 season, and the Putnam Division ceased running passenger service on May 29, 1958. These two events reduced ridership to the extent that it was no longer economically feasible to continue running the shuttle, and it was discontinued August 31, 1958. The bridge's extreme narrowness of 26 feet (7.9 m) between the centers of the trusses, combined with the presence of the Macombs Dam Bridge only a few hundred feet to the south, made it impractical and unnecessary to convert to a roadway bridge, and it was removed in 1960.
