= 167th Street station (IRT Jerome Avenue Line) =

New York City Subway station in the Bronx

167 Street
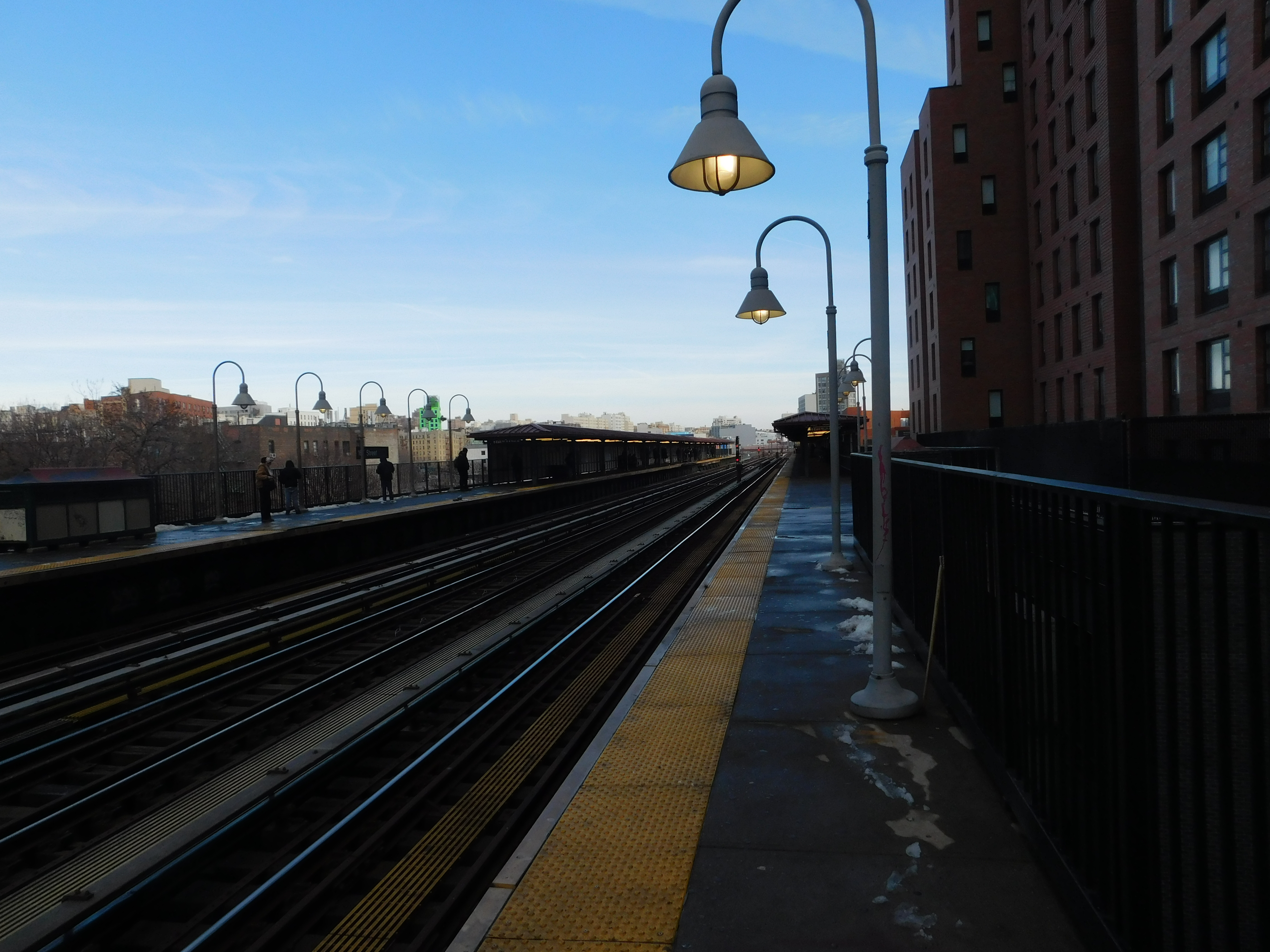
- 167th Street station facing northbound in January 2025

Station statistics
- Address: East 167th Street and River Avenue; Bronx, New York
- Borough: The Bronx
- Locale: Concourse, Highbridge
- Coordinates: 40.835665°N 73.921337°W
- Division: A (IRT)
- Line: IRT Jerome Avenue Line; IRT Ninth Avenue Line (formerly)
- Services: 4 (all times)
- Transit: NYCT Bus: Bx35
- Structure: Elevated
- Platforms: 2 side platforms
- Tracks: 3 (2 in regular service)

Other information
- Opened: June 2, 1917 (109 years ago)

Traffic
- 2025: 1,943,962 ▲12.3%
- Rank: 183 out of 423
Services
Preceding station	New York City Subway	Following station
170th Street 4 toward Woodlawn	4 (New York City Subway service)	161st Street–Yankee Stadium 4 toward Crown Heights–Utica Avenue
Burnside Avenue 4 limited	4 (New York City Subway service)	161st Street–Yankee Stadium 4 toward Crown Heights–Utica Avenue
Non-revenue services and lines
Preceding station	New York City Subway	Following station
	no service	Anderson–Jerome Avenues demolished
Location
Location within New York City Subway
Location within New York City
Location within New York
Track layout
Street map
Station service legend
Symbol	Description
Stops all times	Stops all times

The 167th Street station is a local station on the IRT Jerome Avenue Line of the New York City Subway. Located at the intersection of 167th Street and River Avenue in the Concourse and Highbridge neighborhoods of the Bronx, it is served by the 4 train at all times. This station was constructed by the Interborough Rapid Transit Company as part of the Dual Contracts and opened in 1917.

== History ==
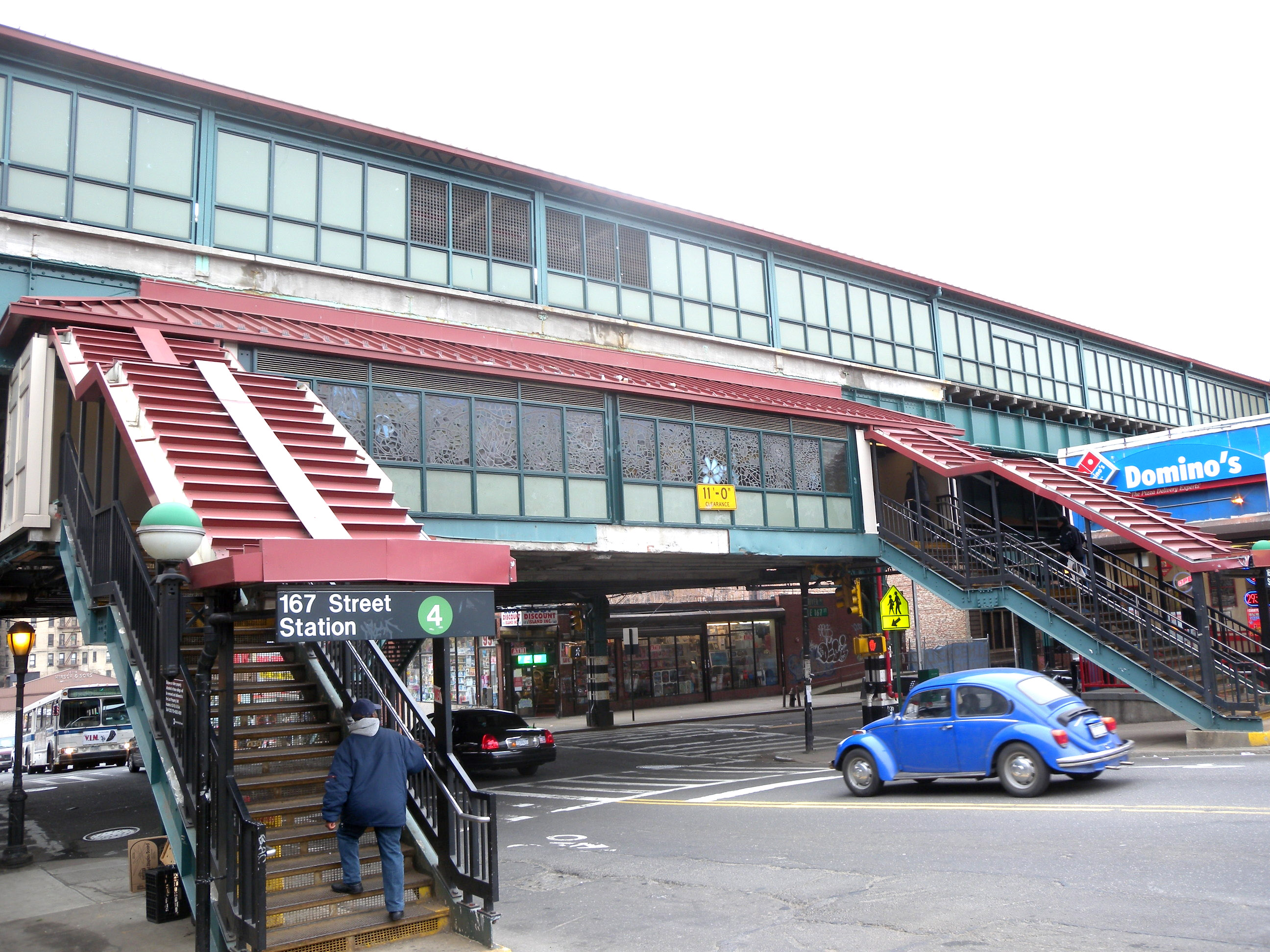
Eastern street stairs

The Dual Contracts, which were signed on March 19, 1913, were contracts for the construction and/or rehabilitation and operation of rapid transit lines in the City of New York. The contracts were "dual" in that they were signed between the city and two separate private companies (the Interborough Rapid Transit Company and the Brooklyn Rapid Transit Company), all working together to make the construction of the Dual Contracts possible. The Dual Contracts promised the construction of several lines in the Bronx. As part of Contract 3, the IRT agreed to build an elevated line along Jerome Avenue in the Bronx.

167th Street station opened as part of the initial section of the line to Kingsbridge Road on June 2, 1917. Service was initially operated as a shuttle between Kingsbridge Road and 149th Street.

On July 1, 1918, trains on the Ninth Avenue Elevated began stopping here, as they were extended from 155th Street, entering the Bronx via the Putnam Bridge, a now-demolished swing bridge immediately north of the Macombs Dam Bridge, to connect with the Jerome Avenue line between 161st Street and 167th Street.

Through service to the IRT Lexington Avenue Line began on July 17, 1918. The line was completed with a final extension to Woodlawn on April 15, 1918. This section was initially served by shuttle service, with passengers transferring at this station. The construction of the line encouraged development along Jerome Avenue, and led to the growth of the surrounding communities.

A new high exit turnstile entrance from the southern end of the northbound platform opened on October 6, 1931.

The city government took over the IRT's operations on June 12, 1940. Also in 1940, the New York City Board of Transportation proposed that the IRT Ninth Avenue Line should be connected to the IRT Lenox Avenue Line near the current Harlem–148th Street station. However, the tunnel from Sedgwick Avenue to Anderson–Jerome Avenues was built to elevated-railway standards, whose "open" third rails were shorter than the subway's "covered" third rails, as the "open" rails did not have any protective covers on top. This incompatibility prevented the connection from being built. Another issue was that the Ninth Avenue Line could not carry subway cars, it was only strong enough to carry the lighter elevated cars.

From 1940 to 1958, 167th Street served as a terminal for the last remnant of the Ninth Avenue El operating from 155th Street (Polo Grounds) to 167th Street. On reaching 167th Street, trains would switch to the center track, change direction, and return to 155th Street on the downtown track. Service was eventually reduced to a single two-car train operating in both directions on the uptown track. In 1958, service was discontinued after the New York Giants left for San Francisco. From the southern end of the station, the ramps leading to the Ninth Avenue line structure can still be seen. These ramps end south of the southwest corner of River Avenue and 164th Street, between Gate 8 and the 164th Street parking garage at Yankee Stadium.

This station was rehabilitated in 2004.

== Station layout ==
This elevated station has three tracks with two side platforms. The 4 stops here at all times.

This station has old-style signs that have been painted over and covered up with new-style signs. It also features new fare control railings as a crossunder.

=== Exits ===
Fare control is situated in the mezzanine under the tracks. Outside of the fare control area, exit stairs go to all corners of River Avenue and 167th Street.
