= First National Bank of Brewster =

Historic commercial building in New York, United States

- U.S. National Register of Historic Places
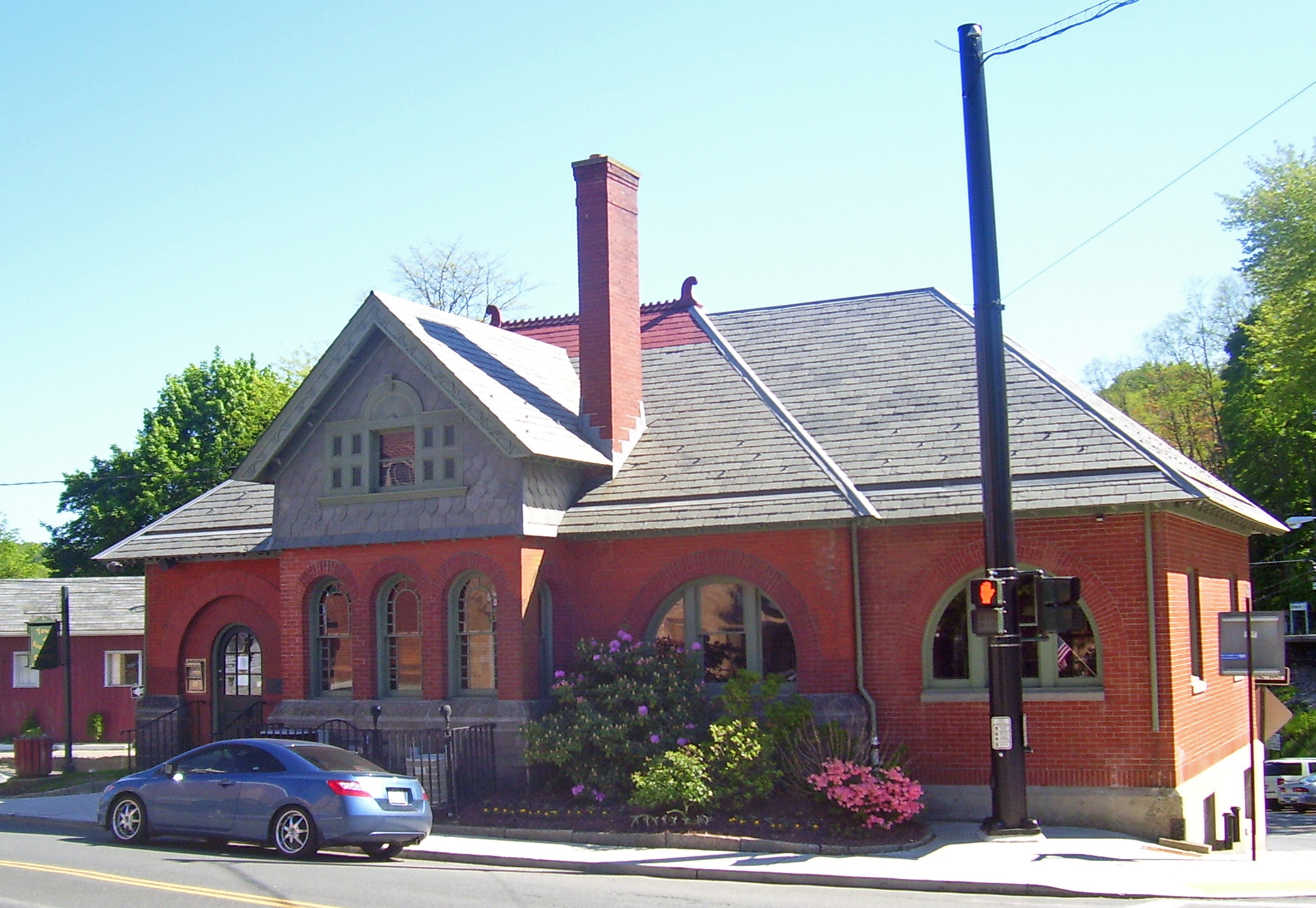
- Front (northeast) elevation and northwest profile, 2008
- Location: Brewster, NY
- Nearest city: Danbury, CT
- Coordinates: 41°23′40″N 73°37′09″W
- Area: less than one acre
- Built: 1886
- Architectural style: Queen Anne
- NRHP reference No.: 87002277
- Added to NRHP: January 7, 1988

The First National Bank of Brewster building, later Southeast Town Hall, is located on Main Street (US 6) next to the train station in Brewster, New York, United States. It is a brick Queen Anne-style building constructed in 1886 currently used as offices for the Town of Southeast, of which Brewster is part.

The bank itself closed in 1964. The building was added to the National Register of Historic Places in 1988 in recognition of its intact style and its place in the village's history.

== Building ==
The rectangular one-story brick building rises from a granite foundation to a hipped roof covered with slate tiles and a decorative ridge cap. The main block's fenestration consists of double-mullioned semicircular windows.

A small wing on the north facade has hexagonal slate shingles and a Palladian window on its gable face; a chimney rises from its roof. It is complemented by a similarly-faced cross-gable on the south side with louvered oculus. The slope of the irregular triangle the building sits on allows for a basement entrance on this side. A small addition on the west side is sympathetic to the original building.

The walls are done in unpainted panelling and the ceilings in unpainted tongue-in-groove. What was the main banking area has a cathedral ceiling and six-branch brass chandelier.

== History ==
The First National Bank was incorporated in 1875 following rapid post-Civil War growth of the village of Brewster and its neighboring areas. It grew successful enough that by 1886 it could afford the current building, whose Queen Anne stylings also incorporate the rounded windows of the also-popular Richardsonian Romanesque style. The bank was purposely located next to the rail depot, the source of much of the prosperity it had helped to finance.

The building was never substantially altered for much of the bank's occupancy, save the addition on the west in 1950. When it closed in 1964, the Town of Southeast, in which Brewster is located, was quick to move in from the old Town Hall down the street. The supervisor and town clerk worked there until the construction of the current Town Hall on NY 22, north of the village. The building, parking, planning and code-enforcement departments are still housed in the old bank.
