= Franklin D. Roosevelt State Park =

State park in Westchester County, New York

- Location within New York
- Type: State park
- Location: 2957 Crompond Road; Yorktown Heights, New York
- Nearest city: Yorktown Heights, New York
- Coordinates: 41°16′59″N 73°48′32″W
- Area: 960 acres (3.9 km^{2})
- Created: 1957
- Operator: New York State Office of Parks, Recreation and Historic Preservation
- Visitors: 490,546 (in 2014)
- Open: All year
- Website: Franklin D. Roosevelt State Park

Franklin D. Roosevelt State Park is a 960-acre (3.9 km^{2}) state park in Westchester County, New York. Formerly known as Mohansic (State) Park, it is situated in Yorktown, approximately 40 miles (64 km) from New York City. It was created in 1922 on the former site of the Mohansic State Hospital and contains two bodies of water: Mohansic Lake and Crom Pond.

== History ==
The state first acquired the park land between 1909 and 1922. The land south of Crom Pond and Mohansic Lake was acquired in 1908 for the New York State Training School for Boys. North of Crom Pond and Mohansic Lake was acquired in 1909 by the State Hospital Commission. There was concern that having a hospital so close to the New Croton Reservoir would pollute the watershed. This helped Westchester County acquire the entire park in 1922.

In 1923, Westchester County grew over 20,000 specimens of pine, spruce and evergreen trees on the park grounds for transplantation to other Westchester parks. During the Great Depression, a Civilian Conservation Corps camp was placed in the park, several buildings from which remain today. New York State acquired the property in 1957. It was renamed Franklin D. Roosevelt State Park in 1982.

== Facilities ==
Franklin D. Roosevelt State Park prominently features a large swimming pool with the capacity to hold 3,500 bathers at one time. The park also offers biking, a boat launch and rentals, disc golf, fishing, ice skating, picnic tables and pavilions, a playground and playing fields, recreation programs, trails for hiking, jogging, snowmobiling and cross-country skiing, and a food concession. Fishing and boating is available on both Crom Pond and Mohansic Lake.

== See also ==
- Donald J. Trump State Park
- List of New York state parks
