= Donald J. Trump State Park =

State park in New York, United States

Donald J Trump State Park French Hill
- Location within New York Location within the United States
- Type: State park (undeveloped)
- Location: Westchester and Putnam counties, New York
- Coordinates: 41°15′47″N 73°48′11″W
- Area: 436 acres (1.76 km^{2})
- Created: 2006
- Operator: New York State Office of Parks, Recreation and Historic Preservation
- Open: Yes

Donald J. Trump State Park is a 436-acre (1.8 km^{2}) state park in the towns of Yorktown and Putnam Valley in Westchester and Putnam counties, New York.

The park consists of property that was donated to New York State in 2006 by the real estate developer Donald Trump. Maintenance of the park was halted in 2010 due to budget constraints, and the park today is a "passive park". Most of the buildings have been demolished; only a few foundations and the existing tennis court remain. Since 2015, there have been several calls to rename the park.

== History ==
Trump purchased the property in 1998 with plans to build a $10 million private golf course. Totalling $2.5 million, it was purchased in two sections: Indian Hill for $1.75 million and French Hill for $750,000. The land contained significant wetlands, and development faced strict environmental restrictions and permitting requirements. He donated it in 2006 after he was unable to gain town approvals to develop the property. At that time, Trump claimed the parcel was worth $100 million. He used the donation as a tax write-off. In the press release announcing the donation, Governor George Pataki praised the gift, and Trump said, "I have always loved the City and State of New York and this is my way of trying to give something back. I hope that these 436 acres of property will turn into one of the most beautiful parks anywhere in the world."

New York State announced the park's closure due to budget cuts in February 2010. It was questioned whether the closure was necessary since the operating budget for the park was only $2,500 a year and it was maintained by workers from the nearby Franklin D. Roosevelt State Park. Although Trump threatened to somehow revoke his donation after the closure was announced, the land remains owned by the state of New York and controlled by its Office of Parks, Recreation and Historic Preservation.

An attempt to convert a portion of the park's French Hill section for use as a dog park in 2010 revealed that at least one of the park's abandoned buildings contained asbestos. By 2012, the planned dog park remained on hold due to difficulties raising funds for fences and asbestos abatement.

The park is not listed at the New York State Office of Parks, Recreation and Historic Preservation park locator, although signs along the nearby Taconic State Parkway direct visitors to Donald J. Trump State Park. During a 2015 visit by The Rachel Maddow Show, there were no signs of any recent upkeep; instead, the publicly accessible land was found to contain crumbling graffiti-covered buildings, empty map kiosks, and weed-choked parking lots.

In 2017, an article on website The A.V. Club framed the park as an "abandoned wasteland", with "muddy fields, overgrown tennis courts, and dilapidated buildings" and a swimming pool in disrepair.

Park access improvements including an asphalt driveway, gravel parking lot, entrance gates, wood fencing, and native tree and shrub plantings were noticed in 2020.

== Geography ==
The park is divided into two sections, the 282-acre (1.1 km^{2}) Indian Hill parcel in northern Jefferson Valley (part of the Town of Yorktown in Westchester County) and Putnam Valley (Putnam County), and the 154-acre (0.6 km^{2}) French Hill parcel in southern Yorktown Heights, fully within the town of Yorktown. The parkland features a mix of continuous forest, open meadows, and several large wetlands. The Indian Hill section was formerly farmland but the farm houses and other buildings were all demolished by 2004. The headwaters of two streams, French Hill Brook and Dogwood Creek, originate in the French Hill section of the park.

== Proposals to rename ==
In late 2015, State Senator Daniel Squadron introduced an "Anything but Trump Act" to change the park's name. Several suggestions for a name change were offered by elected officials. Assemblyman Charles D. Lavine suggested that the park be named for Peter Salem, an African American who served in the American Revolutionary War and is thought by some historians to have been Muslim, while the district's U.S. Representative Sean Patrick Maloney suggested that the park be named after folk singer Pete Seeger. In response, Trump suggested that New York State return the park's land to his ownership. Efforts to rename the park after Pete Seeger continued in early 2016 with a petition by activist group "People for the Pete Seeger State Park" on Change.org.

In September 2017, New York's 25th State Assembly district Representative Nily Rozic, a Democrat, suggested renaming the park in honor of Heather Heyer, who died in a vehicle-ramming attack while protesting the Unite the Right rally in Charlottesville, Virginia. No renaming of the park has been undertaken and the proposal was largely ignored. Rozic, along with New York State Senator Brad Hoylman, reintroduced legislation to rename the park in 2018 but it did not make it out of committee. They again introduced legislation in 2019 to rename the park.

After the 2021 United States Capitol attack, there were renewed attempts to rename the park, and an online petition to rename it after Sojourner Truth (a native of nearby Ulster County) gained over 160,000 signatures. New York Assemblywoman Sandy Galef argued that the state should move forward with changing the park's name, arguing that "Mr. Trump did not sign the appropriate documents with the state, rendering any claim of breach of contract moot." Galef called for the park to be renamed in honor of former New York Republican governor George Pataki, who grew up in the area. Galef wrote, "Monuments, landmarks, and parks can hold a symbolic meaning and in this case a park named for Donald J. Trump can only represent the division he has sought to create in our country over the past four years. This division has no place in our state. Motorists have complained about the Trump signs on the Taconic for years, and we must take a stand." The effort to rename the park failed again in 2021 after not going up for a vote before state lawmakers during the legislative session.

== See also ==
- Franklin D. Roosevelt State Park
- List of New York state parks
- List of things named after Donald Trump
