= Mohansic State Hospital =

Psychiatric hospital in New York, United States

Coordinates: 41.279°N 73.819°W

Mohansic State Hospital (also known as the Mohansic State Insane Asylum, and the Mohansic State Hospital for the Insane) was a hospital which existed near Yorktown Heights in Westchester County, New York.

== History ==
On October 17, 1909, the State Commission in Lunacy purchased 550 acres (2.2 km^{2}) on Lake Mohansic for $135,000, with the intention of building an asylum to accommodate 2,000 (later 6,000) patients to relieve the overcrowding of institutions in New York City. The property was later expanded to 660 acres (270 ha), with an additional 490 acres (2.0 km^{2}) for the New York State Training School for Boys. Dr. Isham G. Harris became superintendent of Mohansic State Hospital in 1910.

In 1911, a spur from the New York and Putnam Railroad was built from Yorktown Heights and across Crom Pond to the site. Construction of the hospital was underway, starting with three "cottages" which housed 165 patients. Strang Cottage was the site of the murder of 19-year-old hospital attendant Charles Wiley, Jr. on July 4, 1913.

In 1916 continued construction on the asylum became the subject of heated debate. Senator Robert F. Wagner cited concerns of pollution to the New Croton Reservoir and the New York City water supply from sewage the asylum would produce, and Senator Henry M. Sage cited the considerable amount the State had already spent developing the property at New York City's request. New York State Governor Charles S. Whitman eventually ordered construction stopped to protect the watershed, and in 1918 he signed a bill which abandoned the hospital project. The funds for Mohansic were re-appropriated for use in construction of an asylum in upstate New York, and the property was converted to a state park in 1918.

The site is currently occupied by Franklin D. Roosevelt State Park.
