= Sedgwick Avenue station =

New York City Subway station in The Bronx (closed 1958)

Sedgwick Avenue
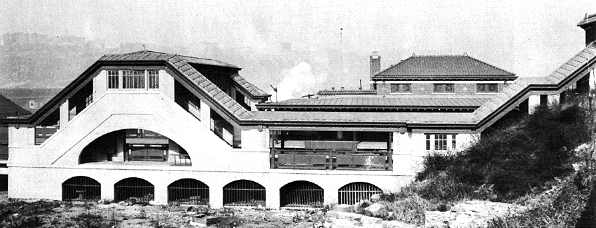
- Sedgwick Avenue station, c. 1918

General information
- Location: Sedgwick Avenue near 161st Street; Bronx, New York; Highbridge, The Bronx
- Coordinates: 40°49′52.8″N 73°55′56.6″W
- Operator: New York Central Railroad (Putnam Division) Interborough Rapid Transit Company; City of New York (after 1940) (Elevated)
- Lines: Putnam Division; Ninth Avenue Line
- Platforms: 2 side platforms (Elevated)
- Tracks: 2 (Elevated)

History
- Opened: July 1, 1918; 108 years ago
- Closed: August 31, 1958; 68 years ago

Former services
Preceding station	New York Central Railroad	Following station
High Bridge toward Brewster	Putnam Division	Terminus
Preceding station	Interborough Rapid Transit	Following station
Anderson–Jerome Avenues toward Burnside Avenue	Ninth Avenue Express	155th Street toward Rector Street
Track layout
Location

The Sedgwick Avenue station was an elevated, ground level and underground station on the Bronx extension of the IRT Ninth Avenue Line in Highbridge, Bronx, New York City.

== History ==
The station was built to connect to the New York & Putnam Railroad (in later decades, the 'Putnam Division') passenger trains that terminated there instead of the former 155th Street terminal and New York Central Railroad Hudson Division trains that stopped at the new (1918) platforms at this location. The station opened on July 1, 1918, and remained in use by the Polo Grounds Shuttle until 1958. The Putnam Division of the New York Central also ended service in 1958.

== Station layout ==
The station was built extending from the tunnel entrance to Jerome Avenue on the side of a cliff on a steel structure spanning the tracks of Metro-North's Hudson Line that connected to the existing Putnam Bridge, which had been built for the New York City and Northern Railroad. The station street entrance and mezzanine was above the tracks on Sedgwick Avenue. The west end of the platforms on the steel structure were constructed of wood. The east end of the concrete platforms extended into the tunnel for about a car length. A connecting passageway and stairways from the west end of the northbound platform led to the platforms on the New York Central Hudson Division tracks to permit transfers to that division's trains. The station site, in 2010, has ruins of the platforms and the track-bed into the tunnel entrance on Sedgwick Avenue. In late 2022, the station was filled in and sealed off as part of the Interstate 87 reconstruction project.

The tunnel from Sedgwick Avenue to Anderson–Jerome Avenues was built to NYC Elevated Railway standards. Those standards specified the clearance between the tracks and the sides of the tunnel only allowed for the "El" type open third rail instead of the covered third rail in use on the IRT Subway. The standard distance from the center of the track to the center of the El type open third rail-head is a few inches shorter than the distance to the subway type covered third rail-head. This incompatibility prevented the line from being used in the future by standard IRT Subway equipment, and brought about the line's demise instead of being linked to the IRT Jerome Avenue Line at 167th Street in the Bronx and the IRT Lenox Avenue Line at Harlem–148th Street in Manhattan, which had been proposed by the New York City Board of Transportation in 1940. A footbridge to West 161st Street remains.

== Gallery ==
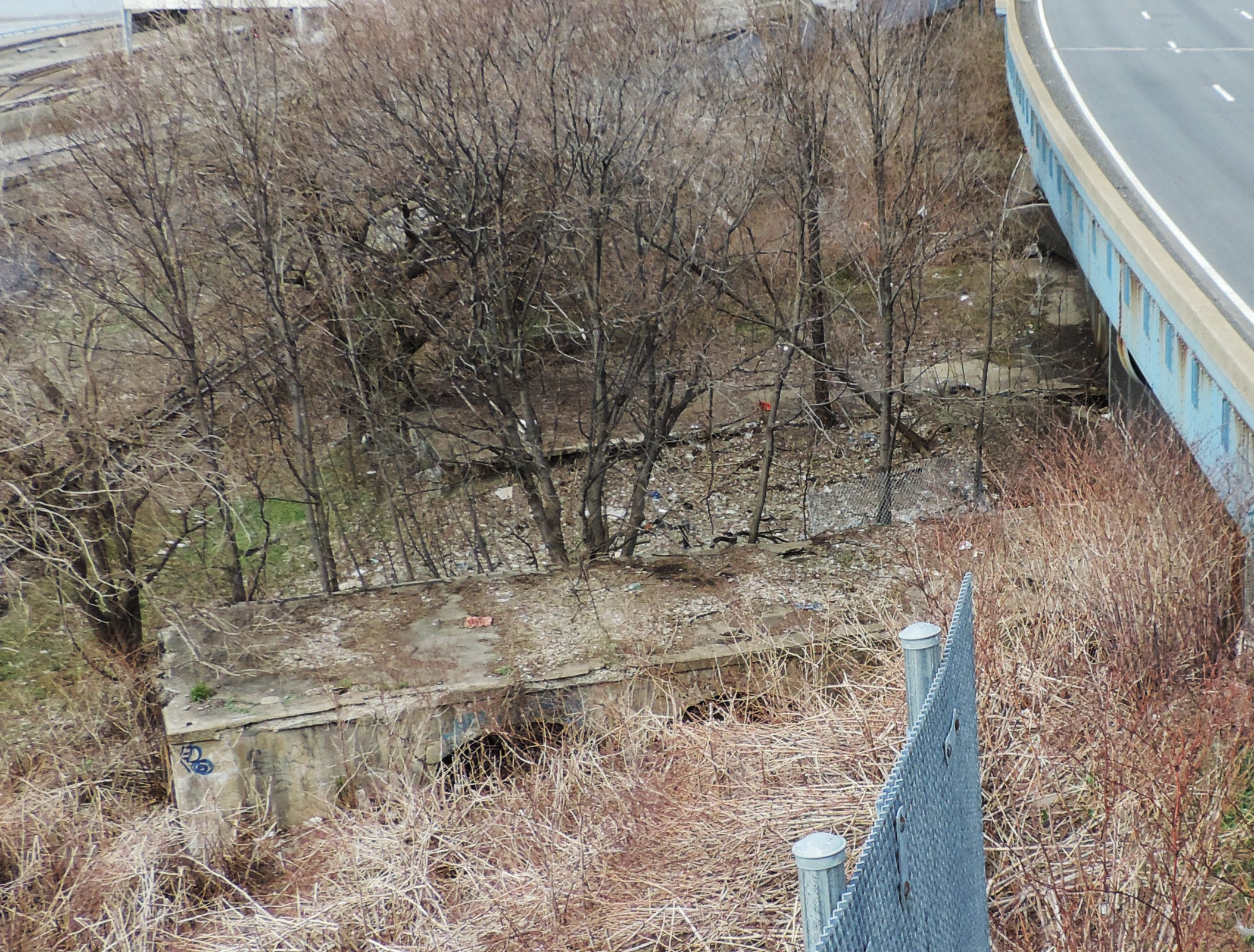
West end of platforms

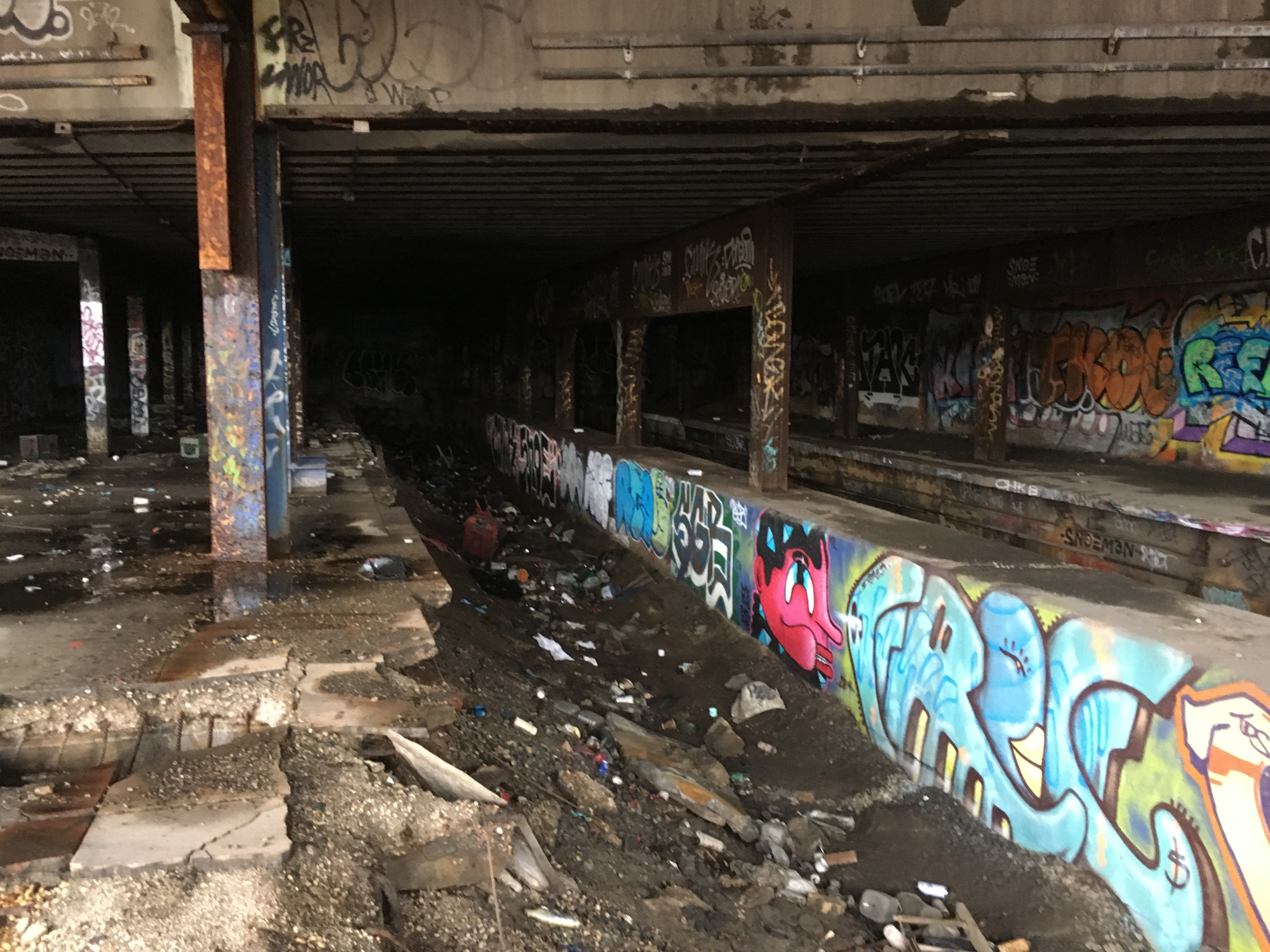
Inside the station
