= Brewster station =

Metro-North Railroad station in New York

Brewster
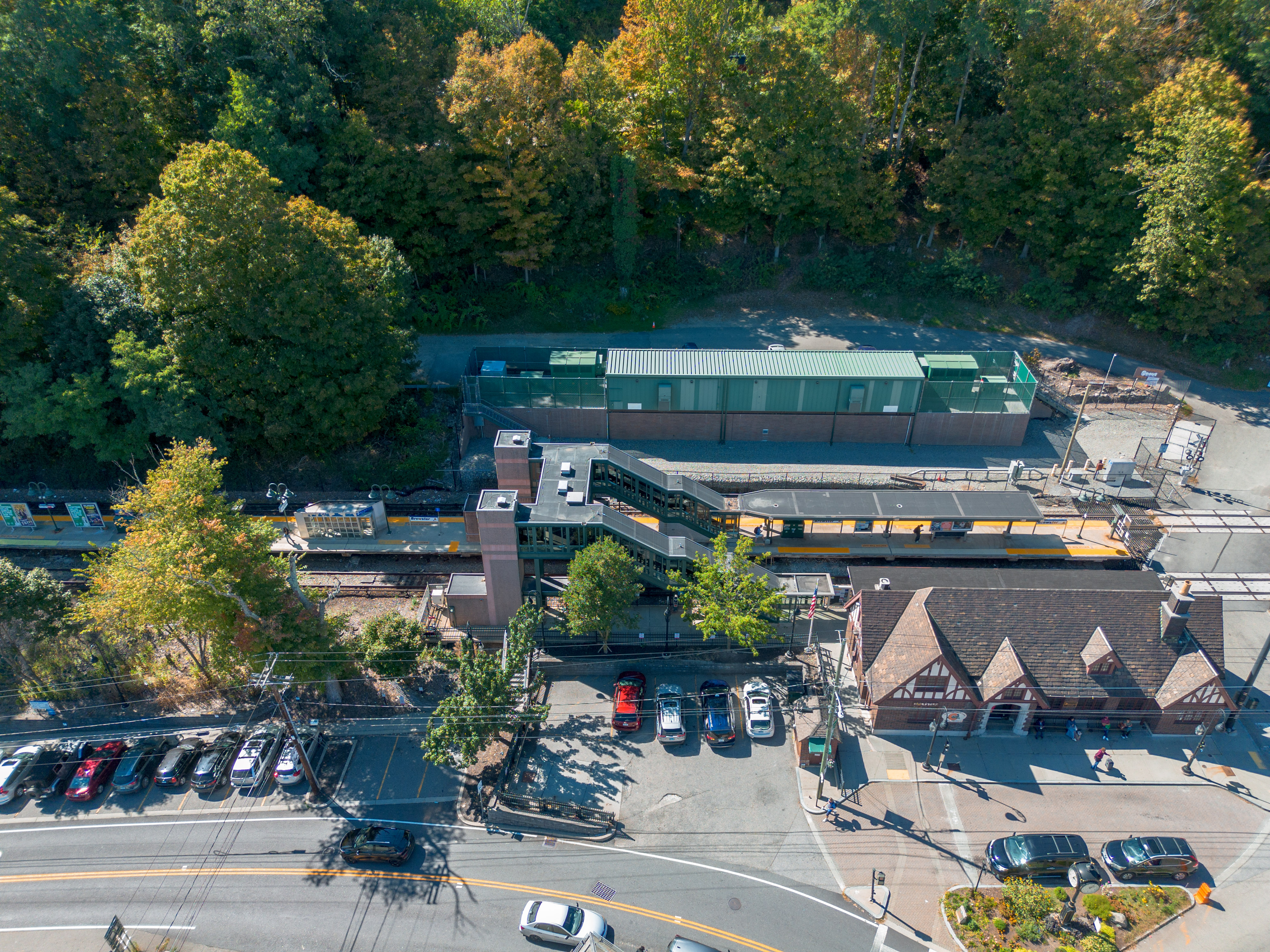
- The station complex in 2025

General information
- Location: 9 Main Street, Brewster, New York
- Coordinates: 41.3947°N 73.6198°W
- Owner: Metro-North
- Line: Harlem Line
- Platforms: 1 island platform
- Tracks: 2
- Connections: Putnam Transit: PART 1 Housatonic Area Regional Transit: 3, Danbury Shuttle

Construction
- Parking: 517 spaces
- Accessible: yes

Other information
- Fare zone: 7

History
- Opened: December 31, 1848
- Rebuilt: August 21, 1931
- Electrified: 1984; 700V (DC) third rail

Passengers
- 2018: 1,174 (Metro-North)
- Rank: 54 of 109

Services
Preceding station	Metro-North Railroad	Following station
Croton Falls toward Grand Central	Harlem Line	Southeast Terminus
Croton Falls toward Grand Central	Harlem Line	Southeast toward Wassaic

Former services
Preceding station	New York Central Railroad	Following station
Croton Falls toward New York	Harlem Division	Dykeman's toward Chatham
Terminus	Putnam Division closed 1958	Tilly Foster toward Sedgwick Avenue
Location

Brewster station is a commuter rail stop on the Metro-North Railroad's Harlem Line, located in Brewster, New York, United States.

A sizable amount of the station's ridership comes from across the Connecticut state line given the quicker trips, shorter headways, and (outside peak hours) lack of a mid-trip transfer to Grand Central as opposed to taking the Danbury Branch of the New Haven Line. Because of this, Housatonic Area Regional Transit (the Greater Danbury-area mass transit provider) has a route and a shuttle connecting Danbury to Brewster station.

== History ==
Railway service in Brewster can be traced as far back as December 31, 1848 when the New York and Harlem Railroad expanded their main line from Croton Falls to Dover Plains stations. Realizing that the NY&H was going to run through the Town of Southeast, Walter and James Brewster constructed passenger and freight stations in 1848, and donated the buildings to the railroad. By 1869 it also served as the terminus of a railroad named the New York and Boston Railroad which eventually became the New York and Putnam Railroad, and by 1881 it was also a terminus for the Boston, Hartford and Erie Railroad which was eventually acquired by the New York and New England Railroad.

On March 7, 1913, the NY&P officially became the Putnam Division trains of the New York Central Railroad and Brewster served as the terminus of that line up until May 28, 1958 when passenger service was discontinued on the Putnam Division main line. After that point, there remained one Harlem Division train which traveled up the Lake Mahopac Branch to the Mahopac railroad station and continued over Putnam tracks and making stops on upper Putnam stations until arriving at Brewster station. This "around the horn" train lasted until April 2, 1959 when all passenger service on the Putnam Division was terminated.

It was one of the stations on the Harlem Line to serve the Berkshire Hills Express and other limited stop trains that went from New York City all the way to Pittsfield, Massachusetts and North Adams, Massachusetts in the Berkshires. Such through trains were replaced by shuttle transfers in 1950.

As with most of the Harlem Line, the merger of New York Central with Pennsylvania Railroad in 1968 transformed the station into a Penn Central Railroad station. Penn Central merged with the New Haven Railroad and its affiliates in 1969 giving them control of all lines in the village. Penn Central's continuous financial despair throughout the 1970s forced them to turn over their commuter service to the Metropolitan Transportation Authority which made it part of Metro-North in 1983.

== Station layout ==
The station itself which dates back to 1931, is located next to downtown Brewster, on US 6. Since parking on the nearby streets is extremely limited, a large parking lot slightly uphill from the station serves commuters. Smaller parking lots are located along eastbound US 6 and on a private road named Ellen Avenue, where it is also notable for having a grade crossing right next to the station, like Katonah. Anti-trespass panels are embedded on the ground and within the tracks between the end of the station platform and the crossing.

The station has one four-car-long high-level island platform serving trains in both directions.
