= The Incident (1967 film) =

1967 film directed by Larry Peerce

- Theatrical release poster with British Columbia censor sticker
- Directed by: Larry Peerce
- Written by: Nicholas E. Baehr
- Produced by: Edward Meadow; Monroe Sachson
- Starring: Victor Arnold; Robert Bannard; Beau Bridges; Ruby Dee; Robert Fields; Jack Gilford; Mike Kellin; Ed McMahon; Gary Merrill; Donna Mills; Tony Musante; Brock Peters; Thelma Ritter; Martin Sheen; Jan Sterling; Diana Van der Vlis
- Cinematography: Gerald Hirschfeld
- Edited by: Armond Lebowitz
- Music by: Charles Fox; Terry Knight
- Production company: Moned Associated
- Distributed by: 20th Century Fox
- Release date: November 5, 1967
- Running time: 107 minutes
- Country: United States
- Language: English
- Budget: $1.1 million
- Box office: $2.1 million

The Incident is a 1967 American neo noir crime-thriller film written by Nicholas E. Baehr, based on his teleplay Ride with Terror (which had been previously adapted as a 1963 television film) and directed by Larry Peerce. The film stars Tony Musante and Martin Sheen (in his first film role) as two street hoods who terrorize 14 passengers sharing a New York City Subway car, played by an ensemble cast that includes Beau Bridges, Ruby Dee, Jack Gilford, Ed McMahon, Gary Merrill, Donna Mills, Brock Peters, Thelma Ritter, Jan Sterling, and Diana Van der Vlis.

The film was made for a budget of $1,050,000.

== Plot ==
On a late Sunday evening in the Bronx, punks Joe Ferrone and Artie Connors are looking for trouble. After giving a hard time to a pool hall owner for closing early, they briefly harass a passing couple, then mug an old man for his eight dollars and beat him into unconsciousness.

Bill Wilks, his wife, Helen, and their sleeping 4-year-old daughter board a southbound 4 train at the Bronx's Mosholu Parkway station at 2:15 AM, after Bill refuses to take a cab to their home in Flushing, Queens, suggesting his wife is a spendthrift. When they enter the last car of the train, which only has one working door, its only other passenger is a sleeping derelict.

At Bedford Park Boulevard–Lehman College, teenage virgin Alice Keenan and her sexually aggressive date Tony Goya, board; at Kingsbridge Road, elderly Jewish couple Bertha and Sam Beckerman, who have been arguing about the responsibilities of the younger generation, board; at Fordham Road, soldiers Pfc. Phillip Carmatti and his Oklahoman friend Pfc. Felix Teflinger, who has a broken arm, board after having dinner with Carmatti's Italian-American parents.

At the Burnside Avenue station, after leaving a cocktail party, middle-aged Muriel Purvis boards with her mousey husband, Harry, whom she resents for earning less money than many of their friends and having no ambition; at 176th Street, out-of-work, recovering alcoholic Douglas McCann, boards, joined by Kenneth Otis, a homosexual who earlier made an unsuccessful attempt at befriending McCann. At Mt. Eden Avenue, angry and racist Arnold Robinson and his long-suffering wife Joan, a black couple, board after attending a charitable event for inner-city youth.

Joe and Artie board at the 170th Street station and proceed to psychologically terrorize, humiliate, and degrade every single adult passenger as the train passes through the next 15 stations. They start with the derelict to whom they attempt to give a hot foot, then move to Douglas, then to Kenneth – a gay man whom they physically prevent from leaving the train, wearing him down psychologically and verbally – and so on.

When the train crosses into Manhattan, the Robinsons' 125th Street station comes up first, but Arnold, enjoying the spectacle of white people tormenting each other, makes Joan stay with him to watch.

At one stop, Joe blocks the doorway to prevent two women from boarding; at 86th Street, he prevents the Beckermans from exiting, then shoves one of the derelict man's shoes into the door to prevent it from opening at further stops.

Throughout the entire train ride, no one has managed to get the upper hand on the two hoods. Joe is finally challenged when he turns his attention to the Wilks' sleeping daughter. Bill and Helen are frantic and appalled that Joe is trying to touch the child. Bill holds her to his chest in a protective grip, with the desperate parents slapping Joe's hands away as he tries to touch her.

Only then does Felix stand up and directly challenge Joe with "Stop! Or I'll put you down!" Joe pulls out his switchblade knife. Felix engages Joe in hand-to-hand combat. Despite his broken arm, and then a stab wound, Felix manages to overpower Joe, using his cast to beat Joe into unconsciousness; subsequently, Artie drops his tough-guy facade and cowers, trying to unjam the one working door and flee. The wounded Felix incapacitates Artie with a knee to the groin, leaving Artie on the floor in agony.

The train soon makes a lengthy stop at the main Grand Central–42nd Street station after Carmatti pulls the emergency brake handle in the car, where Carmatti finally goes over to his injured friend, causing Felix to weakly but disgustedly ask "Where were you, buddy?" Carmatti shouts into the station for the police, who enter the train and, without asking any questions, start to arrest the only black man in the car, Arnold. Passengers cry out, "Not him!" The cops instead pick up and take the bloodied Joe off the train, and a conductor helps the still-moaning Artie off the floor and out. None of them helps the bleeding Felix, who is finally helped off the train by Carmatti.

The other passengers, still frozen in their seats, are stunned. Only when the sleeping drunk rolls over and falls to the floor do the passengers slowly begin to exit the train, stepping over the drunk's unconscious body as they go to the door.

== Cast ==
- Tony Musante as Joe Ferrone
- Martin Sheen as Artie Connors
- Ed McMahon as Bill Wilks
- Diana Van der Vlis as Helen Wilks
- Victor Arnold as Tony Goya
- Donna Mills as Alice Keenan
- Jack Gilford as Sam Beckerman
- Thelma Ritter as Bertha Beckerman
- Beau Bridges as Private First Class Felix Teflinger
- Robert Bannard as Private First Class Phillip Carmatti
- Mike Kellin as Harry Purvis
- Jan Sterling as Muriel Purvis
- Gary Merrill as Douglas McCann
- Robert Fields as Kenneth Otis
- Brock Peters as Arnold Robinson
- Ruby Dee as Joan Robinson
- Don De Leo as Mr. Carmatti
- Nina Hansen as Mrs. Carmatti
- Henry Proach as The Derelict

== Subway locations ==
The New York City Transit Authority denied permission to film on its property, including background shots, but the filmmakers shot them anyway. In order to get the necessary footage, cinematographer Gerald Hirschfeld and his son rode the subway and surreptitiously shot the moving background with a camera hidden in a cardboard box. The outdoor scenes of the train were filmed on and around the Bronx section of the now demolished IRT Third Avenue Line.

Hirschfeld said in an interview that he filmed in black and white in order to get "the most realistic style of photography possible"; test shots were taken in muted color, but they were deemed a distraction from the desired "somber" effect.

All scenes inside the subway car were filmed in a studio mockup of IRT World's Fair Lo-V #5674. The producers contacted St. Louis Car Co. for original blueprints of the car and reproduced it. Lights were mounted along the car exterior and illuminated sequentially to simulate a speed of 30 mph. Subway footage was filmed by concealing the cameras inside bags. Police became suspicious when they heard whirring sounds inside the bags.

== Reception ==
Bosley Crowther wrote, in the New York Times: "An image of the New York cliff-dweller as a timid and cowed creature who hasn't the gumption or audacity to defend himself against the depredations and annoyances of the petty criminals in our midst is inflated to appalling proportions in the melodrama 'The Incident'....No fewer than 15 people...allow themselves to be bullied and maltreated by two drunken hoodlums....And not one of them really rises up and lets these vermin have it until the train is just about passing 59th Street....Climbing aboard at the various stations as the noticeably untended and unpatrolled train makes its way south are a tired and quarreling Jewish couple...a young married couple and their sleeping child...a Bronx soldier and his corn-belt buddy...another married couple...and the Negro racist and his wife. There are also a homosexual...an aging alcoholic on the mend...and a couple of others....Too many times one is reminded by little cliches or big gaucheries that these are only actors, and that anyone could make a break and escape when the doors are opened....Mr. Peerce...is following a pattern that narrows to a single track of menace, which soon becomes monotonous. The only question is who will be the hero. You guess which."

On Rotten Tomatoes, the film holds an approval rating of 88% based on eight reviews, with an average rating of 7.5/10.

=== Awards ===
Círculo de Escritores Cinematográficos (Cinema Writers Circle Awards), Spain, 1970

- The Incident won CEC (Círculo de Escritores Cinematográficos) Award for Best Art & Experimental Film

Mar del Plata Film Festival, Argentina, 1968

- Tony Musante - won Best Actor for his role as Joe Ferrone
- Nicholas E. Baehr - won Best Screenplay
- Larry Peerce - won Critics Grand Prize Award
- Larry Peerce - nominated for Best Film, but did not win

== Box office ==
According to Fox records, the film made $2,075,000.
