= 183rd Street station (IRT Jerome Avenue Line) =

New York City Subway station in the Bronx

183 Street
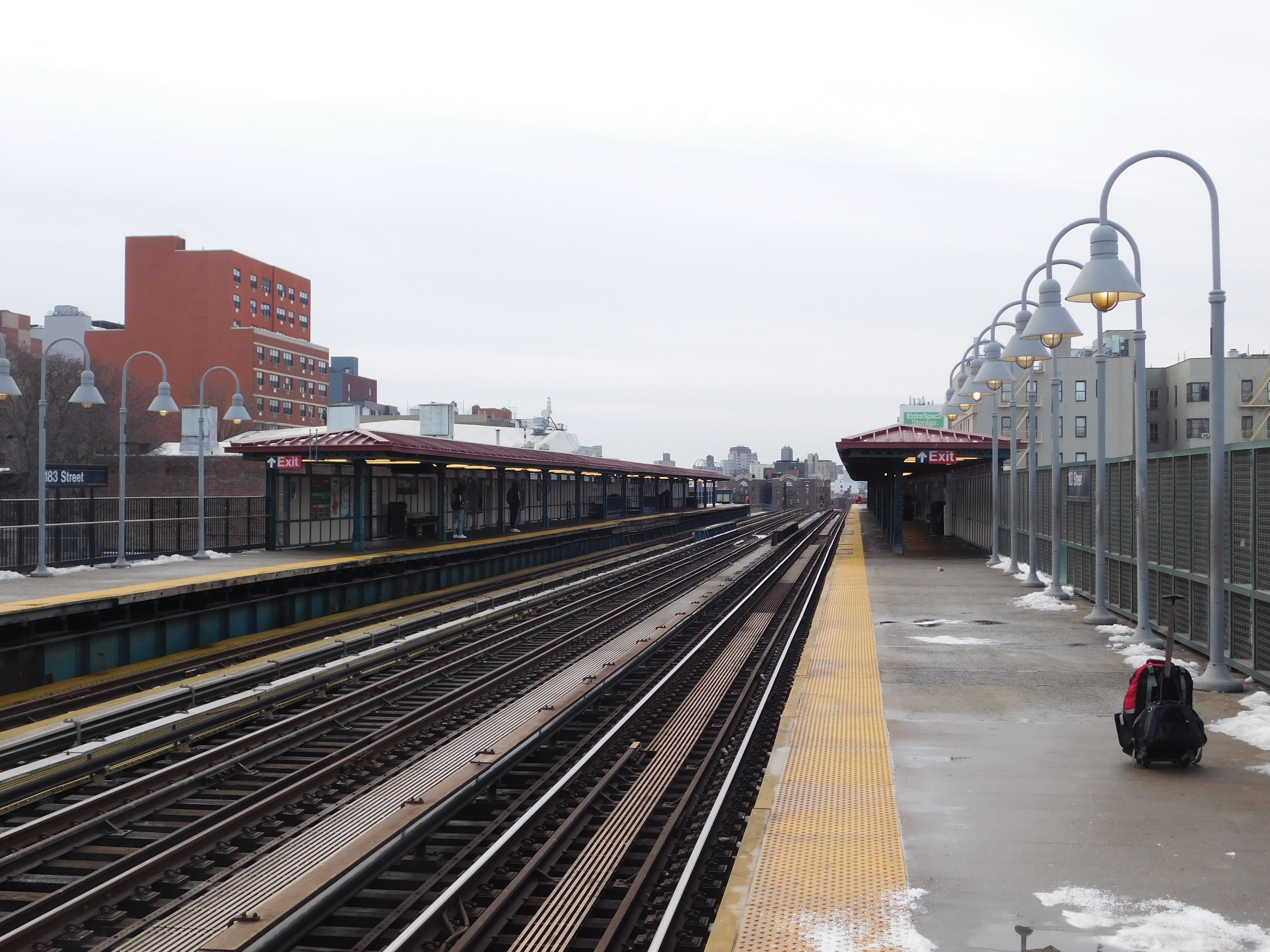
- View from the southbound platform

Station statistics
- Address: 183rd Street and Jerome Avenue; Bronx, New York
- Borough: The Bronx
- Locale: University Heights, Fordham
- Coordinates: 40.858324°N 73.903999°W
- Division: A (IRT)
- Line: IRT Jerome Avenue Line
- Services: 4 (all times)
- Transit: NYCT Bus: Bx32
- Structure: Elevated
- Platforms: 2 side platforms
- Tracks: 3 (2 in regular service)

Other information
- Opened: June 2, 1917 (109 years ago)

Traffic
- 2025: 1,179,964 ▲8.6%
- Rank: 280 out of 423
Services
Preceding station	New York City Subway	Following station
Fordham Road toward Woodlawn	4 (New York City Subway service)	Burnside Avenue toward Crown Heights–Utica Avenue
Location
Location within New York City Subway
Location within New York City
Location within New York
Track layout
Street map
Station service legend
Symbol	Description
Stops all times	Stops all times

The 183rd Street station is a local station on the elevated IRT Jerome Avenue Line of the New York City Subway. Located at the intersection of 183rd Street and Jerome Avenue in the University Heights and Fordham Heights neighborhoods of the Bronx, it is served by the 4 train at all times. This station was constructed by the Interborough Rapid Transit Company as part of the Dual Contracts and opened in 1917.

== History ==
=== Construction and opening ===
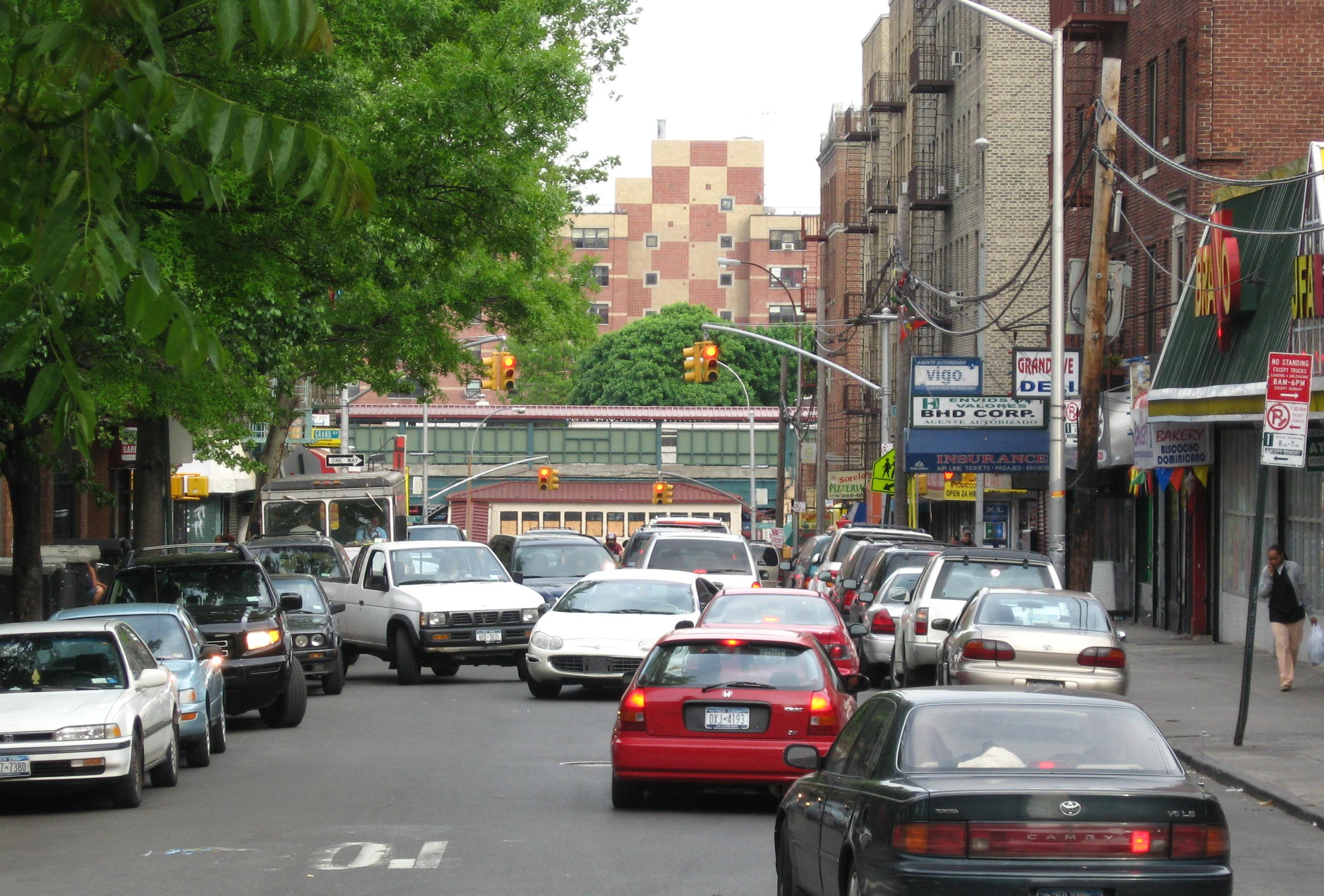
Western side of the station from three blocks away

The Dual Contracts, which were signed on March 19, 1913, were contracts for the construction and/or rehabilitation and operation of rapid transit lines in the City of New York. The contracts were "dual" in that they were signed between the City and two separate private companies (the Interborough Rapid Transit Company and the Brooklyn Rapid Transit Company), all working together to make the construction of the Dual Contracts possible. The Dual Contracts promised the construction of several lines in the Bronx. As part of Contract 3, the IRT agreed to build an elevated line along Jerome Avenue in the Bronx.

183rd Street station opened as part of the initial section of the line to Kingsbridge Road on June 2, 1917. Service was initially operated as a shuttle between Kingsbridge Road and 149th Street. Through service to the IRT Lexington Avenue Line began on July 17, 1918. The line was completed with a final extension to Woodlawn on April 15, 1918. This section was initially served by shuttle service, with passengers transferring at 167th Street. The construction of the line encouraged development along Jerome Avenue, and led to the growth of the surrounding communities. The city government took over the IRT's operations on June 12, 1940.

=== Later years ===
In 1995, as a result of budget crisis, the Metropolitan Transportation Authority considered a package of service reductions, including permanently closing the 183rd Street station, as well as two or three other stations citywide, due to its proximity to other stations.

Beginning on March 5, 2007, 183rd Street and Kingsbridge Road were closed for renovation as part of a $55 million contract to renovate five stops on the IRT Jerome Avenue Line. The other three stops in the contract (Burnside Avenue, Mosholu Parkway, and Bedford Park Boulevard) were already renovated before then. This work was completed in twelve weeks on May 21, about eight weeks ahead of schedule.

== Station layout ==
The station has three tracks and two side platforms. The middle track is generally not used in revenue service. The 4 stops here at all times.

There are old style signs painted over and covered up with new style signs, and a crossunder exists within fare control.

The 2008 artwork here is called Many Trails by Jose Ortiz. It features laminated glass windows in the mezzanine of the western station house, depicting the cultural history of University Heights.

=== Exits ===
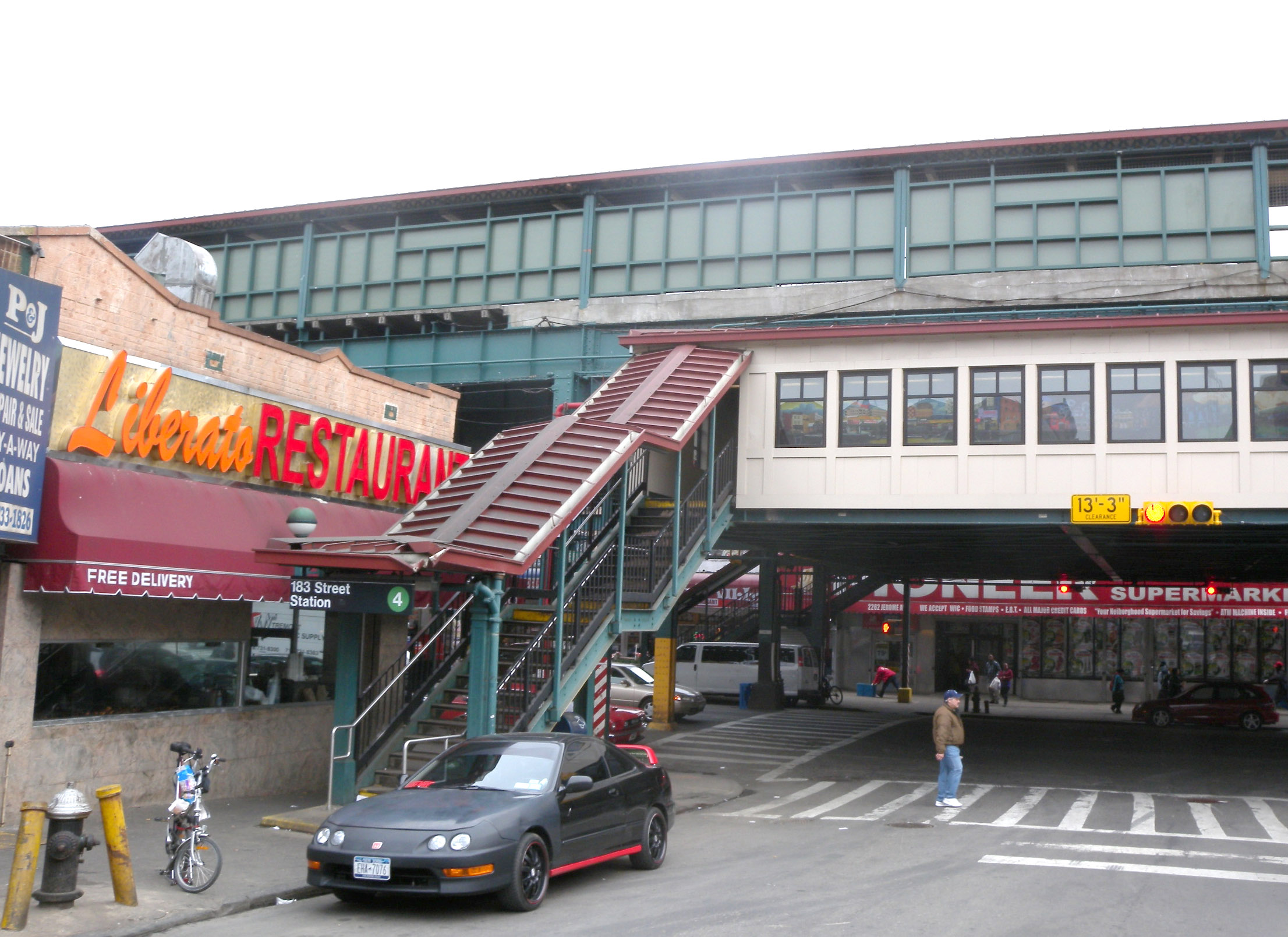
Northwestern street stair

The station has a wooden mezzanine under the tracks. Outside of fare control, exits go to the northwest, southwest, and southeast corner of the staggered intersection of Jerome Avenue and 183rd Street.
