= 138th Street–Grand Concourse station =

New York City Subway station in the Bronx

138 Street–Grand Concourse
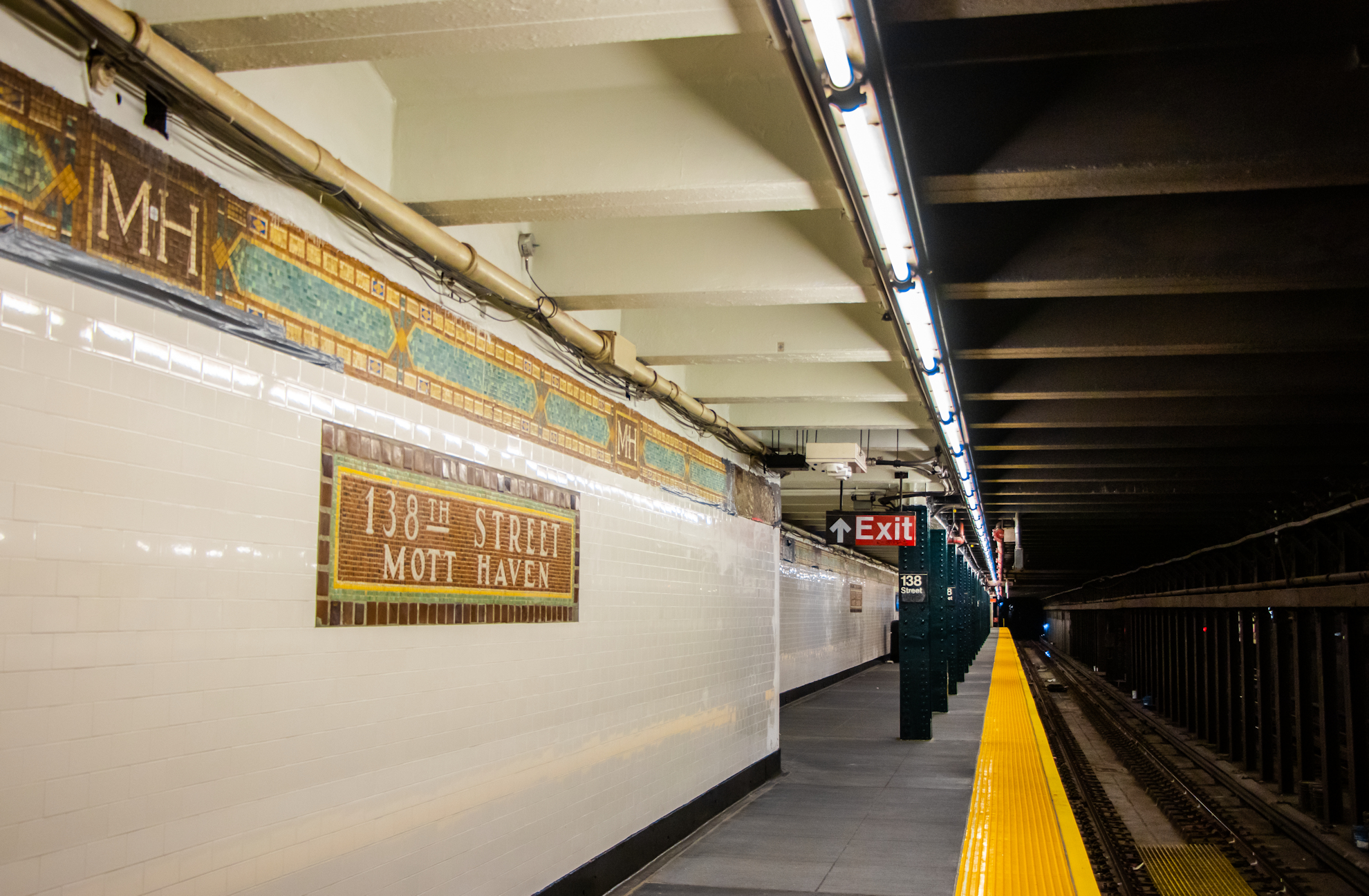
- Northbound station platform

Station statistics
- Address: East 138th Street & Grand Concourse; Bronx, New York
- Borough: The Bronx
- Locale: Mott Haven
- Coordinates: 40.81303°N 73.929963°W
- Division: A (IRT)
- Line: IRT Jerome Avenue Line
- Services: 4 (all except rush hours, peak direction); 5 (all except late nights)
- Transit: NYCT Bus: Bx1, Bx33
- Structure: Underground
- Platforms: 2 side platforms
- Tracks: 3

Other information
- Opened: July 17, 1918; 108 years ago
- Former/other names: Mott Haven Avenue

Traffic
- 2025: 938,201 ▲15.3%
- Rank: 323 out of 423
Services
Preceding station	New York City Subway	Following station
149th Street–Hostos 4 toward Woodlawn	4 (New York City Subway service)	125th Street 4 5 via Franklin Avenue–Medgar Evers College
149th Street–Hostos 5 toward Eastchester–Dyre Avenue	Local	125th Street 4 5 via Franklin Avenue–Medgar Evers College
Location
Location within New York City Subway
Location within New York City
Location within New York
Track layout
Street map
Station service legend
Symbol	Description
Stops all times except late nights	Stops all times except late nights
Stops all times except rush hours in the peak direction	Stops all times except rush hours in the peak direction

The 138th Street–Grand Concourse station, also signed as 138th Street–Mott Haven or simply as Mott Haven on station signage, is a local station on the IRT Jerome Avenue Line of the New York City Subway, located at the T-intersection of East 138th Street and the Grand Concourse in the Mott Haven neighborhood of the Bronx. It is served by the 4 train at all times except during rush hours in the peak direction, and the 5 train at all times except late nights.

== History ==
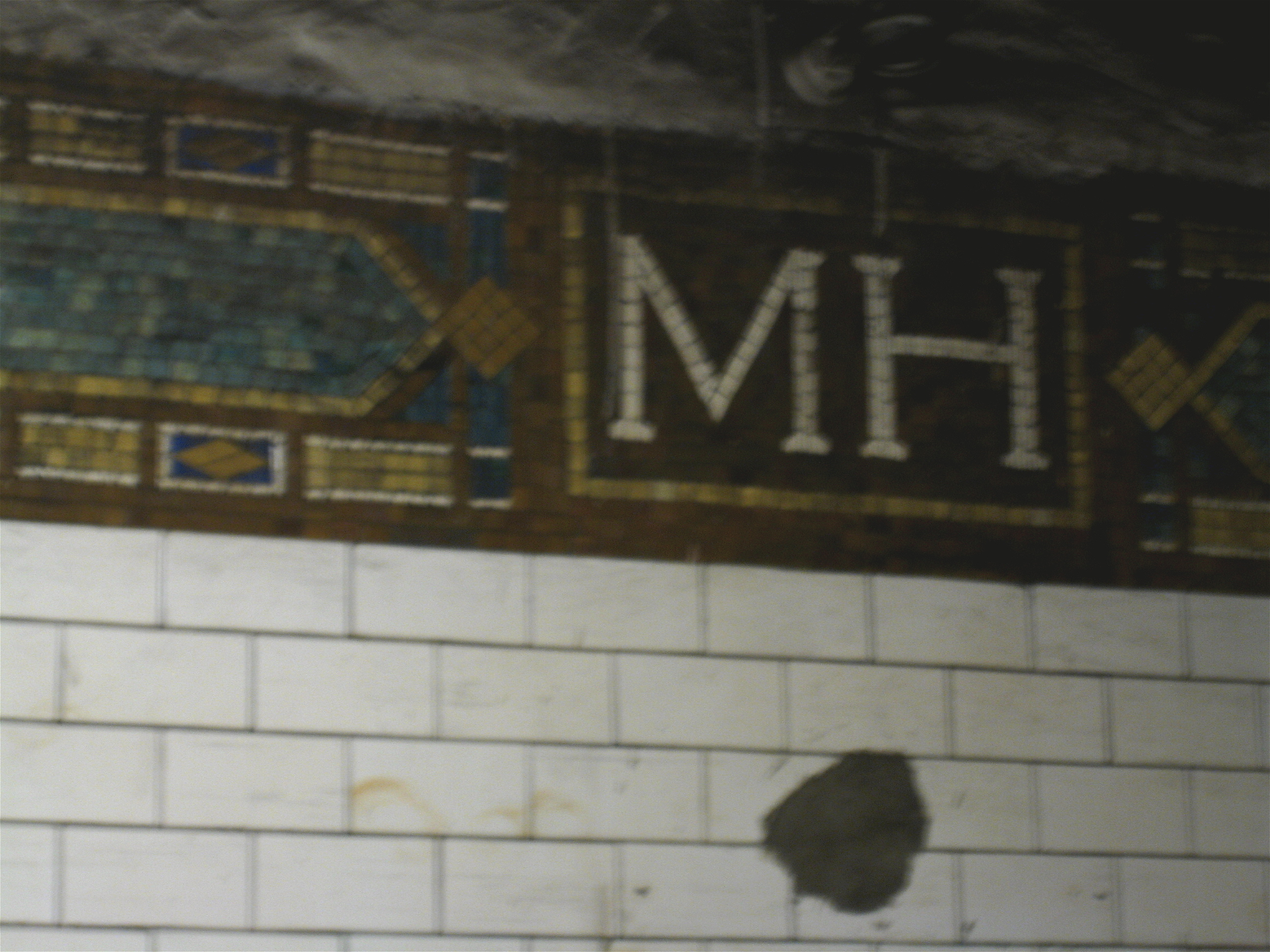
The Mott Haven Avenue "MH" Mosaics along one of the platforms.

The station opened on July 17, 1918, as Mott Haven Avenue station, as a southbound extension of the Jerome Avenue Line into the Upper East Side extension of the IRT Lexington Avenue Line. As such, it is the newest station on the line. The segment north of Kingsbridge Road to Woodlawn opened three months earlier. The city government took over the IRT's operations on June 12, 1940. The station was built with tablets displaying "Mott Haven" and others displaying "138th Street–Mott Haven." The ones with "138th Street" were painted over with text reading "138th Street–Grand Concourse", but all were eventually covered with black plates reading "138 Street" in white Standard (Akzidenz-Grotesk) lettering. During the station's renovation in the late 2010s, most of the tablets were restored.

In 1956, the New York City Transit Authority announced plans to add fluorescent lighting to the station. The fluorescent lights were installed along the edges of the station's platforms.

The walls of both platforms retain their original mosaic trim line with "MH" tablets on it – a relic of the station's former name. The platforms were extended at both ends in the 1950s; the design of these platform extensions are in contrast from the original portions, as they have a blue trim with "138TH ST" in white lettering. Blue i-beam columns run along both platforms at regular intervals with alternating ones having the standard black number plates in white lettering.

Until 1972, the station had a connection to the New York Central Railroad's 138th Street station, which served trains on the railroad's Harlem and Hudson Divisions.

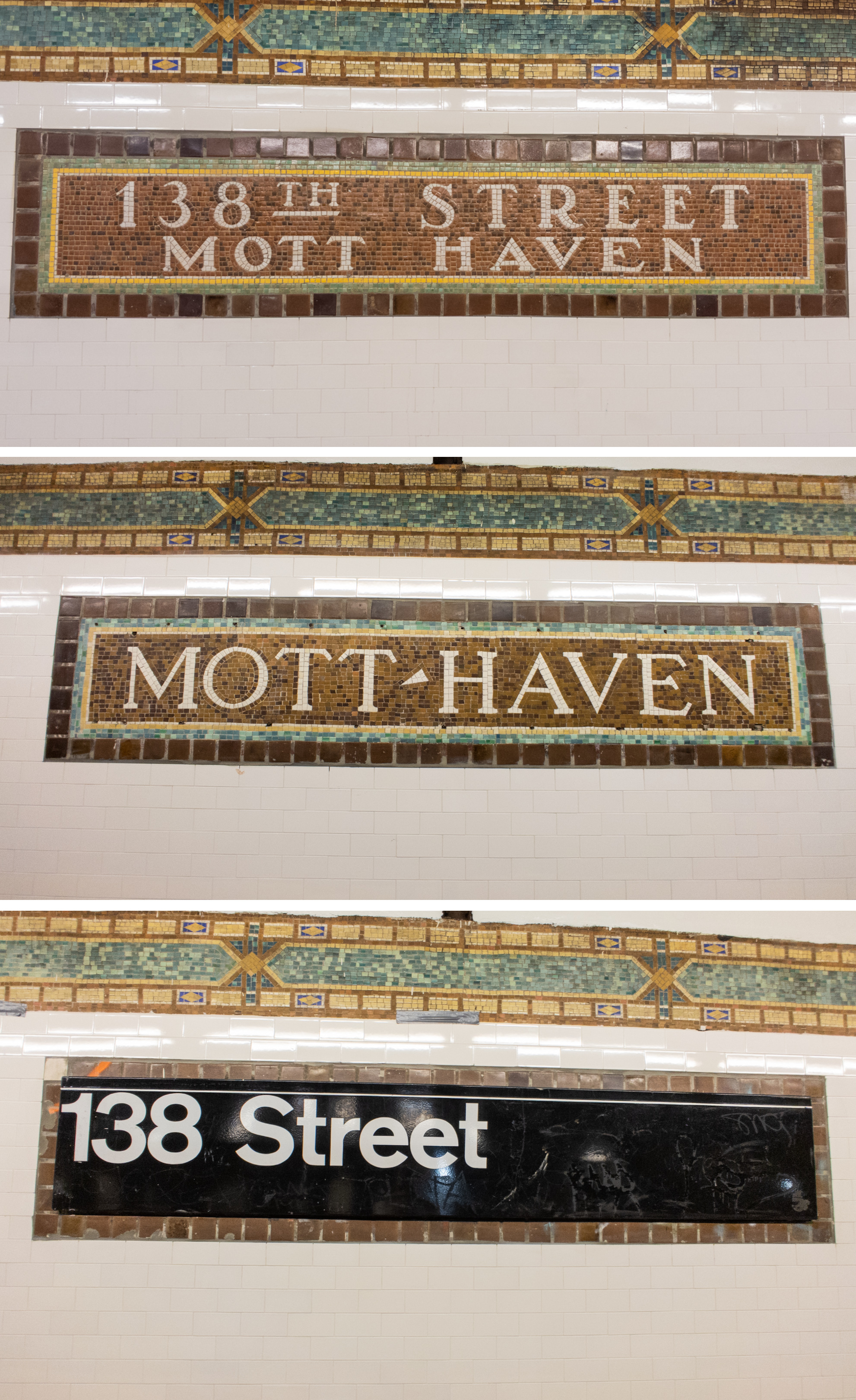
Mosaics and signage at 138th Street–Mott Haven

In 2011, the advocacy group Transportation Alternatives took a poll of subway riders to vote for the smelliest subway station in the system, as part of its "rank the stank" contest. This station was ranked the smelliest of four nominated stations, receiving 35% of the votes.

From November 18, 2019, to March 30, 2020, the northbound platform was temporarily closed for renovations. From April 27, 2020, to July 27, 2020, the southbound platform was temporarily closed for renovations.

== Station layout ==
The 138th Street–Grand Concourse station has two side platforms and three tracks, and is one of only two on the IRT Jerome Avenue Line to be built underground. The 4 train skips this station during rush hours in the peak direction. It is the southernmost station on the IRT Jerome Avenue Line. To the south, the line crosses the Harlem River to the next stop, the 125th Street station in East Harlem, Manhattan. The three tracks merge into two and then merge with the IRT Pelham Line to form the four-track IRT Lexington Avenue Line. To the north, the local tracks split into two: an inner set that continues north to the Jerome Avenue Line's 149th Street–Hostos station, and an outer set that descends to a lower level and makes a sharp turn to merge with the IRT White Plains Road Line directly west of that line's 149th Street–Hostos station. The 5 train uses these tracks during daytime hours.

Both platform walls have their original mosaic trim line with "MH" tablets on it, a relic of Mott Haven Avenue, the former name of the station. At either ends of the platform, where they were extended in the 1950s, the walls have a blue trim with "138TH ST" in white lettering. Blue i-beam columns run along both platforms at regular intervals with alternating ones having the standard black number plates in white lettering.

The station was built with tablets displaying "Mott Haven" and others displaying "138th Street–Mott Haven." The ones with "138th Street" were painted over with text reading "138th Street–Grand Concourse", but all were eventually covered with black plates reading "138 Street" in white Standard (Akzidenz-Grotesk) lettering. During the station's renovation in the late 2010s, most of the tablets were restored.

Until 1972, the station had a connection to the 138th Street station which served both the Harlem and Hudson Divisions of the New York Central Railroad.

=== Exits ===
This station has one mezzanine above the center of the platforms and tracks. Two staircases from each platform go up to a waiting area/crossover, where a turnstile bank provides access to and from the station. Outside fare control, there is a token booth and two staircases going up to the northern corners of East 138th Street and the Grand Concourse. The mezzanine has its original "Uptown Trains" and "Downtown Trains" mosaic tablets and trim line.
