= IRT Jerome Avenue Line =

New York City Subway line

- The 4 train serves the entire IRT Jerome Avenue Line at all times. One station is also served by the 5 train.

Overview
- Owner: City of New York
- Locale: The Bronx, New York City
- Termini: Woodlawn; 138th Street–Grand Concourse
- Stations: 14

Service
- Type: Rapid transit
- System: New York City Subway
- Operator: New York City Transit Authority
- Daily ridership: 150,979 (2023)

History
- Opened: June 12, 1917; 109 years ago
- Last extension: 1918

Technical
- Num of tracks: 2-3
- Character: Underground (South of Yankee Stadium); Elevated (Most of The Bronx)
- Track gauge: 4 ft 8 1/2 in (1,435 mm)
- Electrification: 600V DC third rail
Route map
Express station	Local station

The IRT Jerome Avenue Line, also unofficially known as the IRT Woodlawn Line, is an A Division New York City Subway line mostly along Jerome Avenue in the Bronx. Originally an Interborough Rapid Transit Company-operated route, it was built as part of the Dual Contracts expansion and opened in 1917 and 1918. It is both elevated and underground, with 161st Street–Yankee Stadium being the southernmost elevated station. The line has three tracks from south of the Woodlawn station to the 138th Street–Grand Concourse station. The Woodlawn Line also has a connection to the Jerome Yard, where 4 trains are stored, just north of the Bedford Park Boulevard–Lehman College station.

== Extent and service ==
=== Service patterns ===
The following services use part or all of the IRT Jerome Avenue Line:

Service	Time period	Between	
Service	Time period	Woodlawn 149 St–Hostos	North of 138 St–GC North of 125 St
"4" train	Rush hours	local/express	express peak direction only
"4" train	Other times	local	
"5" train	All except late nights	no service	local
"5" train	Late nights	no service	

The Jerome Avenue Line is served locally by the 4 train at all times, except for the 138th Street–Grand Concourse station, as well as select trains which run express to Burnside Avenue from 149th Street-Hostos. Other than those, the 4 serves 138th Street at all times except rush hours in the peak direction, and the 5 train stops at 138th Street all times except late nights.

During late AM rush and evening rush hours, some northbound trains run express from 167th Street to short turn at Burnside Avenue.

=== Route description ===
Though named for Jerome Avenue, the southernmost portion of the line runs underground beneath the Grand Concourse. North of the 149th Street station around the vicinity of Franz Sigel Park, the line curves to the northwest and emerges from a tunnel under Gerard Avenue north of East 153rd Street, and becomes an elevated line over River Avenue just south of the intersection with East 157th Street. Just north of Yankee Stadium station, the line encounters the skeletal remains of the IRT Ninth Avenue elevated line between Gate Number 8 and the east end of the 164th Street Parking Garage, between the intersections of 162nd and 164th Streets. Almost a block after 167th Street station, the line finally runs over the eponymous road when River Avenue ends at Jerome Avenue across from the intersection of East 169th Street.

The line remains over Jerome Avenue for most of the rest of its journey. The north end of the Mount Eden Avenue station can be seen from the Cross Bronx Expressway. After the northwest entrance of the historic Concourse Yard and then north of 198th Street, the road briefly moves east of the line. North of Bedford Park Boulevard station, Jerome Avenue returns under the line and between the intersections with East 205th Street and West 205th Street, a spur for the Jerome Yard branches off to the northwest as well. The IRT Jerome Avenue Line finally ends at Woodlawn, while Jerome Avenue itself continues north towards the Major Deegan Expressway.

== History ==
=== Planning ===
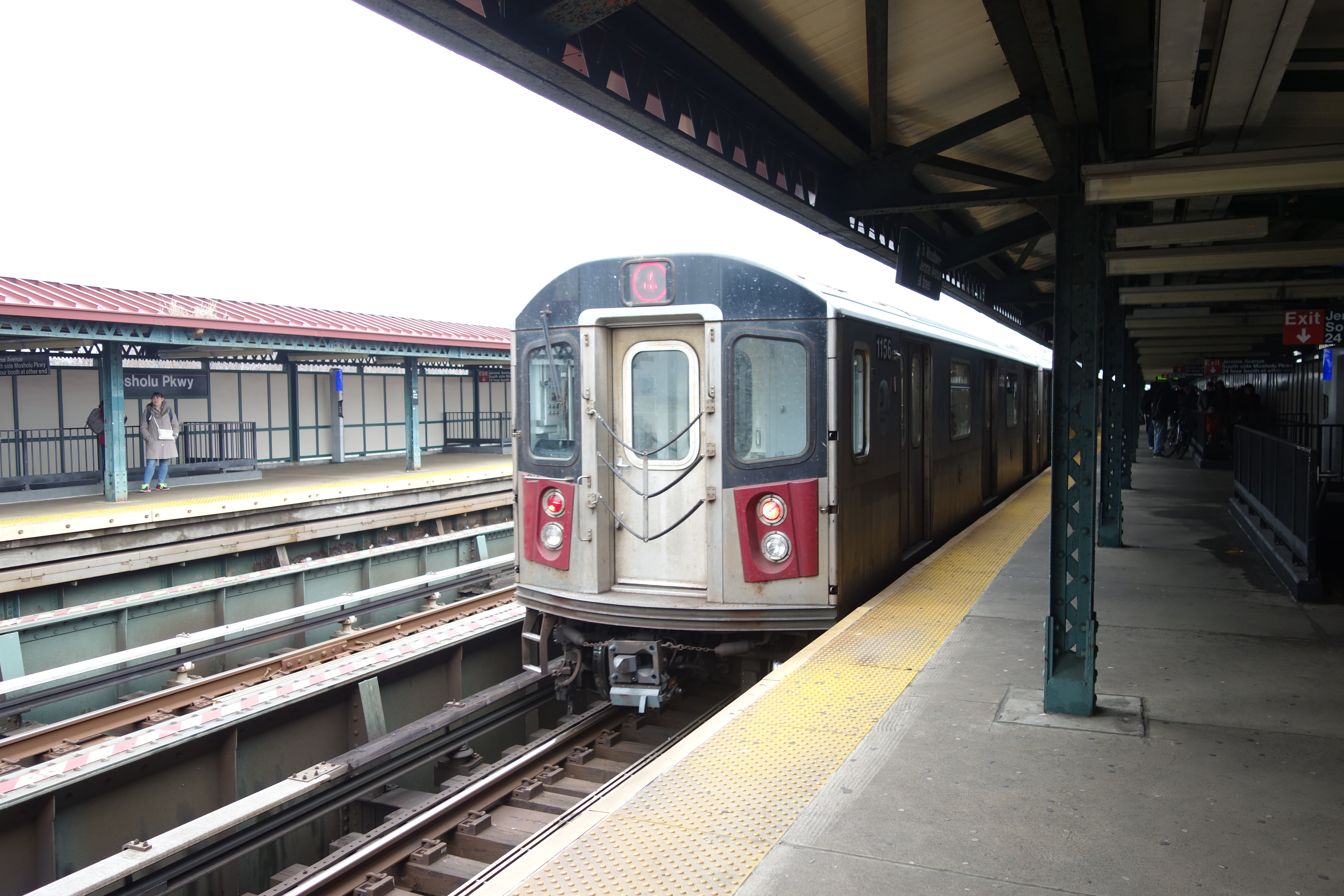
A Woodlawn-bound 4 local train made up of 10 R142 Cars leaves the Mosholu Parkway station before the last stop on the line, Woodlawn.

For more than two decades, there had been calls to provide transit service to the residents of the Western Bronx. When the first subway was being planned, a branch of the line to this area was under consideration, but it was not found to be feasible to build such a connection because of financial reasons. The Board of Rapid Transit Commissioners, on June 1, 1905, adopted three rapid transit routes: Numbers 15, 16, and 17, all with the purpose of serving the underserved western area of the borough. Route 15 would have been a four-track subway under Jerome Avenue, with a connection to the Ninth Avenue Elevated through 162nd Street. Route 16 called for a three-track elevated line along Jerome Avenue, extending from Clarke Place north to Woodlawn Road. Route 17 would have required the construction of a subway line under Gerard Avenue to form the southern connection to the Jerome Avenue Line. Of the three options, Route 15 was approved by the New York City Board of Estimate on July 14, 1905, and by Mayor George McClellan two weeks later.

On June 16, 1908, the proposal to construct a subway under Gerard Avenue was abandoned because of the soil conditions, which made the project too expensive to be constructed at the time. Instead, the Commission adopted Route 23, known as the River Avenue route, which provided for an elevated railroad and subway connecting the Jerome Avenue elevated line with the Lexington Avenue Line. This route was utilized as part of the Jerome Avenue Line. The route was approved by the Board of Estimate on June 26, 1908, and by the Mayor four days later.

=== Construction and opening ===
The Dual Contracts, which were signed on March 19, 1913, were contracts for the construction and/or rehabilitation and operation of rapid transit lines in the City of New York. The contracts were "dual" in that they were signed between the City and two separate private companies (the Interborough Rapid Transit Company and the Brooklyn Rapid Transit Company), all working together to make the construction of the Dual Contracts possible. The Dual Contracts promised the construction of several lines in the Bronx. As part of Contract 3, the IRT agreed to build an elevated line along Jerome Avenue in the Bronx.

The first part of the line opened on June 2, 1917 as a shuttle service between Kingsbridge Road and 149th Street. Only the southbound platform was in use at Kingsbridge Road. This was in advance of through service to the IRT Lexington Avenue Line, which began on July 17, 1918.

The line was extended from Kingsbridge Road to its final terminal of Woodlawn on April 15, 1918. This section was initially served by shuttle service, with passengers transferring at 167th Street. The Jerome Avenue line cost approximately $7 million, with $3 million spent on the elevated section and $4 million spent on the underground section. The construction of the line encouraged development along Jerome Avenue and led to the growth of the surrounding communities.

On July 1, 1918, trains on the Ninth Avenue El were extended from 155th Street, entering the Bronx via the Putnam Bridge, a now-demolished swing bridge immediately north of the Macombs Dam Bridge, to connect with the Jerome Avenue line between 161st Street and 167th Street.

Beginning on July 17, 1918, Ninth Avenue El service was extended to Kingsbridge Road. On January 2, 1919, rush hour Ninth Avenue El express trains began running to Woodlawn. On December 11, 1921, Lexington Avenue–Jerome Avenue subway trains began running north of 167th Street at all times, replacing elevated trains, which ran to Woodlawn during rush hours, but terminated at 167th Street during non-rush hours. Four were killed and 45 injured in a collision between two trains on April 29, 1929, two hundred feet north of 167th Street station.

=== Later changes ===
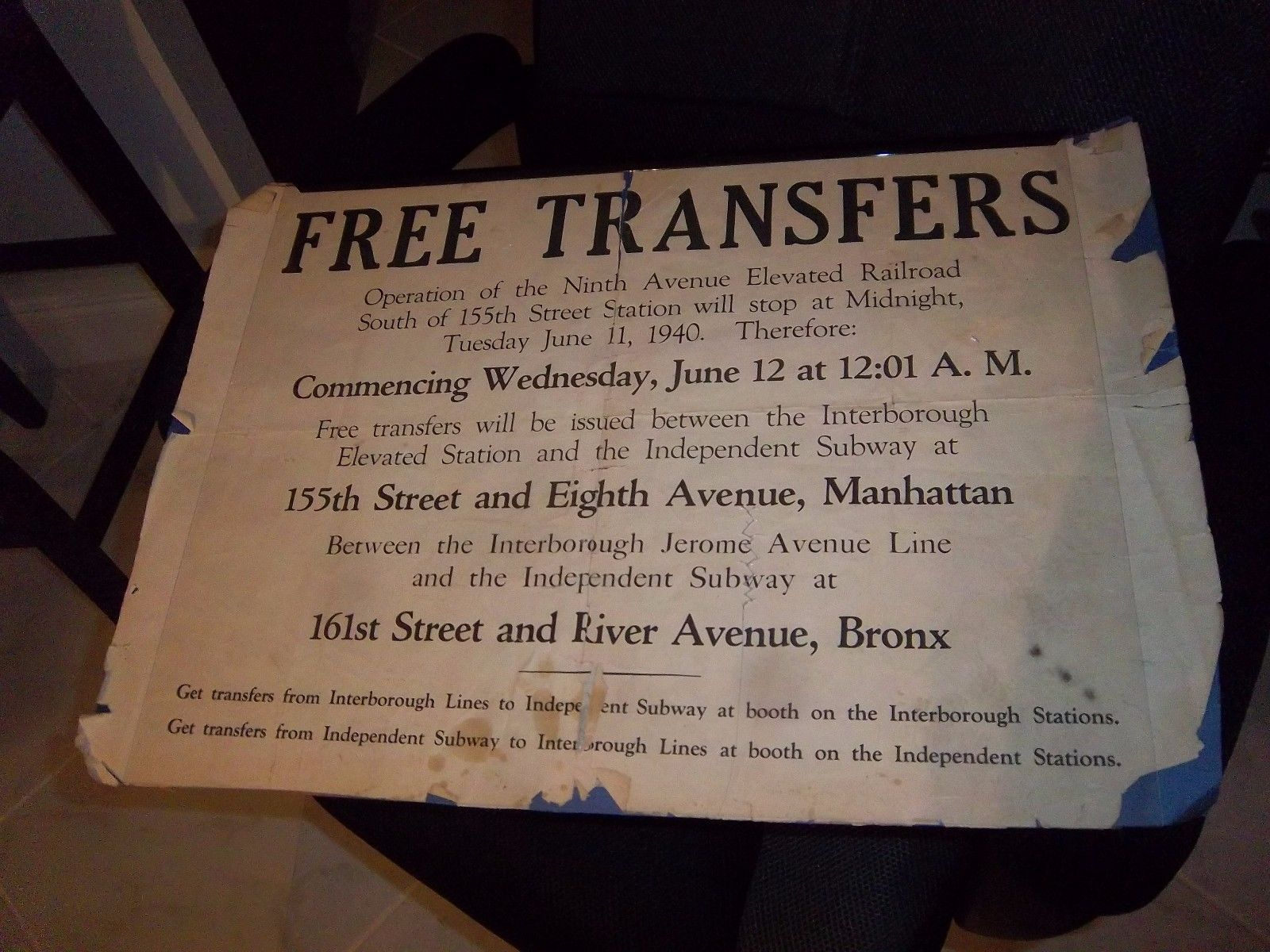
Sign announcing the end of Ninth Avenue El service south of the 155th Street station.

Following the closure of the lower portion of the Ninth Avenue Elevated on June 11, 1940, service from 155th Street to Burnside Avenue in the Bronx was continued as the "Polo Grounds Shuttle," or the 155th Street Shuttle, at all hours. A paper transfer issuance was established between the shuttle and the IND Concourse Line station at 155th Street at the Polo Grounds. IRT composite construction subway cars replaced the wooden elevated cars on the line, but retained the elevated third rail shoes. Dual third rail operation remained in use on the Jerome Avenue Line to the yards at Bedford Park until shuttle service ended in 1958; the structure and the bridge were removed in 1962. The northern terminal of the shuttle was cut back to 167th Street on June 1, 1941. Service ended on August 31, 1958 as a result of the departure of the New York Giants baseball team (moved to San Francisco) and the ending of passenger service on the New York Central's Putnam Division.

In Fiscal Year 1960, work began on the extension of platforms at some stations on the line to 525 feet (160 m) to accommodate ten-car trains. In addition, work to replace wooden platforms at six stations on the line with concrete ones was completed. Replacing the wooden platforms with concrete ones reduced maintenance costs and increased the longevity of the platforms.

In 1986, the New York City Transit Authority launched a study to determine whether to close 79 stations on 11 routes, including the Jerome Avenue Line north of 167th Street, due to low ridership and high repair costs. Numerous figures, including New York City Council member Carol Greitzer, criticized the plans.

On March 27, 2004, Mount Eden Avenue and 167th Street closed for three months to be renovated. On July 5, 2004, Fordham Road, 170th Street, and 176th Street closed for four months so they could be renovated. As part of the project, new canopy roofs, walls, lighting, staircases, floors, token booths, and public address systems would be installed at each station.

In 2006, work began on a $55 million contract to renovate five stops on the line to bring them into a state of good repair. As part of the project, station mezzanines were refurbished, electrical upgrades were completed, platform floors, canopy roofs, and windscreens were replaced. In addition, fluorescent lighting and tactile platform edge strips were installed. Work on the project was completed in phases so as to reduce inconveniences to riders. From June 17, 2006 to October 16, 2006, Bedford Park Boulevard and Burnside Avenue were closed for repairs. From October 30, 2006, to January 2007, the northbound platform at Mosholu Parkway was closed to be renovated. Work on the southbound platform began on August 13, 2007, and was expected to be completed in mid-November 2007. As part of the project, the southern entrance to the station was reopened. From March 5, 2007 to May 21, 2007, Kingsbridge Road and 183rd Street were closed to be renovated. The stations reopened eight weeks ahead of schedule.

As part of a pilot program to evaluate express service on the line, from June 8, 2009 to June 26, 2009, the MTA operated four trains southbound on the express track between 7:15 a.m. and 8:00 a.m.. The trains entered service at Woodlawn, switched to the express track after stopping at Mosholu Parkway, and ran express to 149th Street–Hostos, stopping only at Burnside Avenue. From October 26, 2009, to December 11, 2009, another pilot program to run express service ran, this time adding Bedford Park Boulevard–Lehman College as an additional stop. A fifth train had also been added and trains now ran every 20 minutes from 7:00 a.m. to 8:20 a.m.

== Station listing ==
Station service legend
Stops all times	Stops 24 hours a day
Stops all times except late nights	Stops every day during daytime hours only
Stops all times except rush hours in the peak direction	Stops 24 hours a day, except during weekday rush hours in the peak direction
Stops rush hours only	Stops during weekday rush hours only
Stops rush hours in the peak direction only	Stops during weekday rush hours in the peak direction only
Time period details
Disabled access	Station is compliant with the Americans with Disabilities Act
↑	Station is compliant with the Americans with Disabilities Act in the indicated direction only
↓	Station is compliant with the Americans with Disabilities Act in the indicated direction only
	Elevator access to mezzanine only

Neighborhood (approximate)	Disabled access	Station	Tracks	Services	Opened	Transfers and notes
Bronx
Norwood		Woodlawn		4	April 15, 1918	Terminal
Norwood	Center Express track begins (No regular service to 149th Street–Hostos)					
Norwood	Disabled access	Mosholu Parkway	local	4	April 15, 1918	
connecting tracks to Jerome Yard
Bedford Park		Bedford Park Boulevard–Lehman College	local	4	April 15, 1918	
connecting track to Concourse Yard
Kingsbridge Heights		Kingsbridge Road	local	4	June 2, 1917	
University Heights	Disabled access	Fordham Road	local	4	June 2, 1917	Bx12 Select Bus Service
University Heights		183rd Street	local	4	June 2, 1917	
Morris Heights		Burnside Avenue	all	4	June 2, 1917	Northbound platform closed for renovations and elevator installation until September 2026.
Morris Heights		176th Street	local	4	June 2, 1917	
Highbridge		Mount Eden Avenue	local	4	June 2, 1917	
Highbridge	Disabled access	170th Street	local	4	June 2, 1917	
Highbridge / Concourse		167th Street	local	4	June 2, 1917	
Highbridge / Concourse	Disabled access	161st Street–Yankee Stadium	local	4	June 2, 1917	Bx6 Select Bus Service; B D (IND Concourse Line); Connection to Metro-North Railroad's Hudson Line at Yankees–East 153rd Street
4 service switches to/from center express track
Mott Haven	Disabled access	149th Street–Hostos	all	4	June 2, 1917	2 5 (IRT White Plains Road Line)
Mott Haven	Branch from IRT White Plains Road Line joins (5 )					
Mott Haven		138th Street–Grand Concourse	local	4 5	July 17, 1918	Originally named Mott Haven Avenue
Mott Haven	Center Express track ends					
Continues as IRT Lexington Avenue Line (4 5 )
