= Victor Arnold (American actor) =

American actor

- Arnold as the police Captain in The Protector
- Born: Arnold Ratner; July 1, 1936; Herkimer, New York, United States
- Died: April 13, 2012 (aged 75); Buffalo, New York, United States
- Occupation: Actor
- Years active: 1956–2011

Victor Arnold (born Arnold Ratner; July 1, 1936 – April 13, 2012) was an American actor. He appeared in more than 40 films from 1956 to 2011. He also played roles on various television shows and soap operas, including The Edge of Night and The Best of Everything.

== Select filmography ==
Year	Title	Role	Notes
1967	The Incident	Tony Goya	
1971	Shaft	Charlie	
1973	The Seven Ups	Barilli, a Seven-Up cop	
1979	...And Justice for All	Leo Fauci	
1980	The First Deadly Sin	Officer Kendall	
1981	Wolfen	Roundenbush	
1983	All the Right Moves	Henry the Bartender	
1983	The Returning	Al Lyons	
1985	The Protector	Police Captain	
1986	Agent on Ice	Aldo	
1989	True Blue	Servino, Chief of NYPD	
1994	Hits!	Vinny	
1996	Trees Lounge	Tony Basilio	
2000	Two Family House	Mr. Cicco	
2000	The Yards	Albert Granada	
2011	Loveless	Paul Sr.	final film role
