= Mosholu Parkway station =

New York City Subway station in the Bronx

Mosholu Parkway
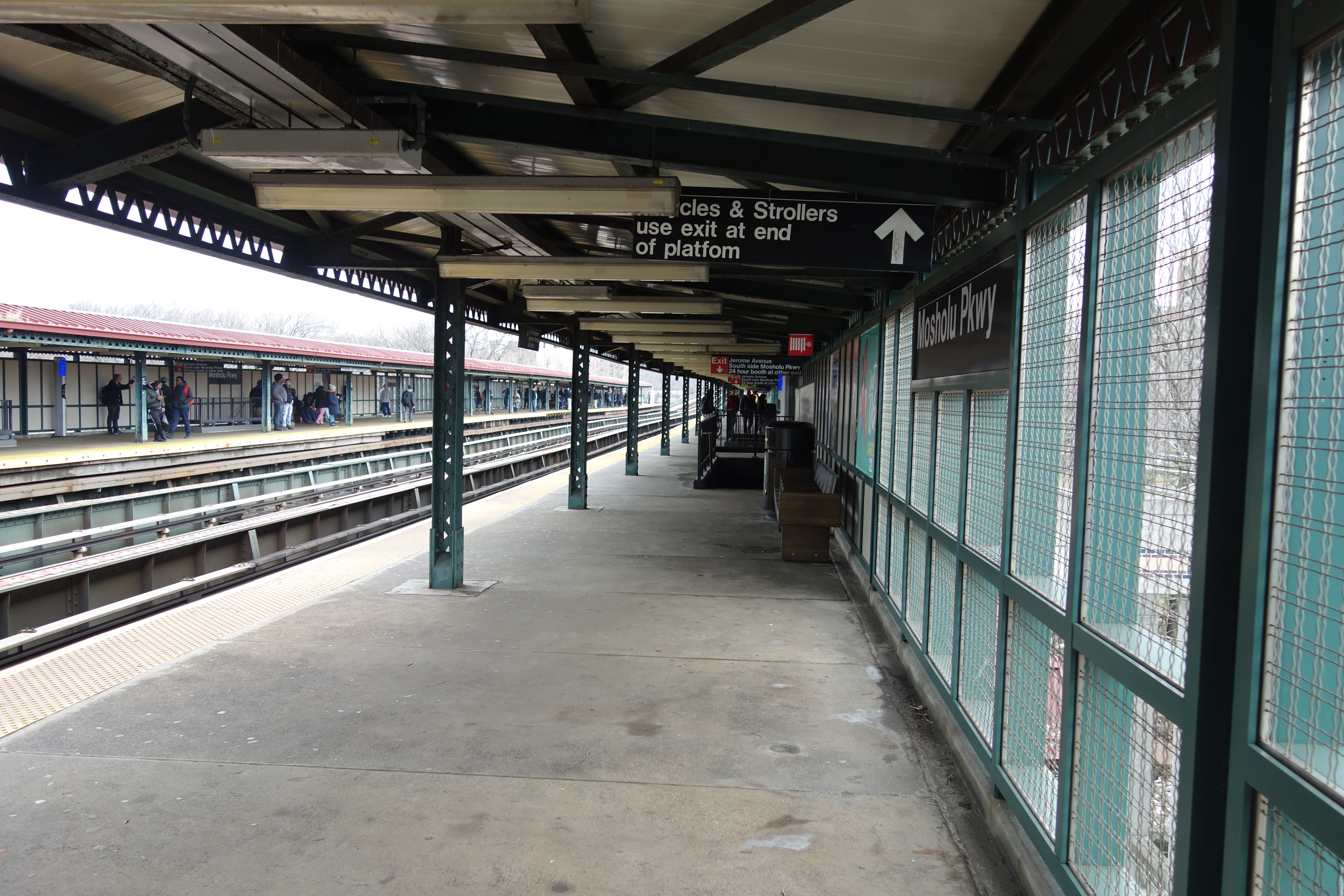
- Woodlawn bound platform view

Station statistics
- Address: Mosholu Parkway & Jerome Avenue; Bronx, New York
- Borough: The Bronx
- Locale: Bedford Park, Norwood, Kingsbridge Heights
- Coordinates: 40.879711°N 73.884687°W
- Division: A (IRT)
- Line: IRT Jerome Avenue Line
- Services: 4 (all times)
- Transit: NYCT Bus: Bx1, Bx2, Bx10, Bx28; Bee-Line Bus: 4, 20, 21
- Structure: Elevated
- Platforms: 2 side platforms
- Tracks: 3 (2 in regular service)

Other information
- Opened: April 15, 1918; 108 years ago
- Accessible: Yes

Traffic
- 2025: 1,465,845 ▲0.5%
- Rank: 231 out of 423
Services
| Preceding station | New York City Subway | Following station |
|---|---|---|
| Woodlawn Terminus | 4 (New York City Subway service) | Bedford Park Boulevard–Lehman College toward Crown Heights–Utica Avenue |
Location
Location within New York City Subway
Location within New York City
Location within New York
Track layout
Street map
Station service legend
| Symbol | Description |
| Stops all times | Stops all times |

The Mosholu Parkway station is a local station on the IRT Jerome Avenue Line of the New York City Subway. Located at the intersection of Mosholu Parkway and Jerome Avenue in the Bedford Park and Norwood neighborhoods of the Bronx, it is served by the 4 train at all times.

This station was constructed by the Interborough Rapid Transit Company as part of the Dual Contracts and opened in 1918. It was renovated between 2006 and 2007, and elevators were installed at the station in the 2020s, making it compliant with the Americans with Disabilities Act of 1990.

== History ==
=== Construction and opening ===
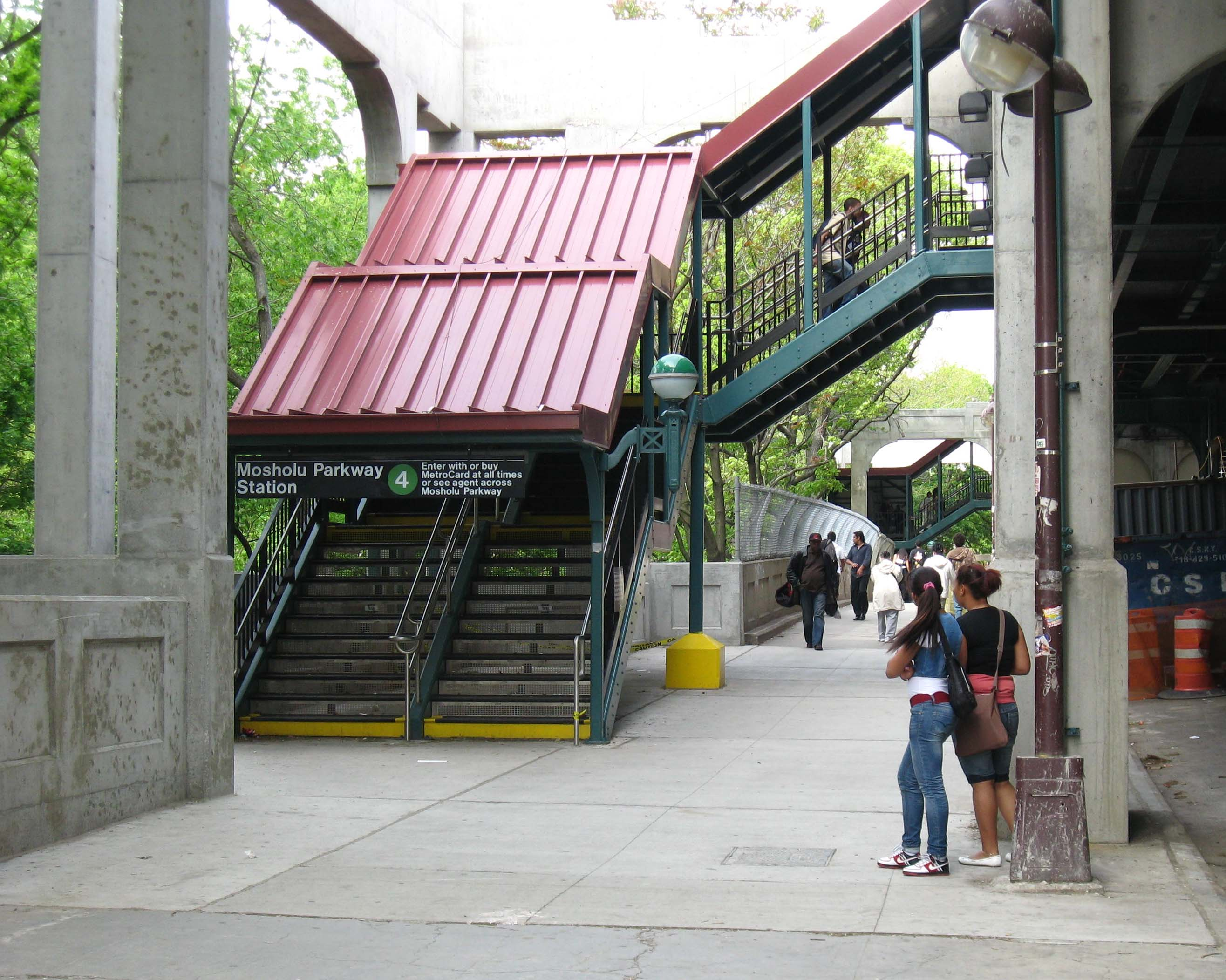
Station entrance pictured in 2008

The Dual Contracts, which were signed on March 19, 1913, were contracts for the construction and/or rehabilitation and operation of rapid transit lines in the City of New York. The contracts were "dual" in that they were signed between the City and two separate private companies (the Interborough Rapid Transit Company and the Brooklyn Rapid Transit Company), all working together to make the construction of the Dual Contracts possible. The Dual Contracts promised the construction of several lines in the Bronx. As part of Contract 3, the IRT agreed to build an elevated line along Jerome Avenue in the Bronx.

The first part of the line opened on June 2, 1917 as a shuttle service between Kingsbridge Road and 149th Street, in advance of through service to the IRT Lexington Avenue Line, which began on July 17, 1918. Mosholu Parkway station opened on April 15, 1918 as part of the final extension of the IRT Jerome Avenue Line from Kingsbridge Road to Woodlawn. This section was initially served by shuttle service, with passengers transferring at 167th Street. The construction of the line encouraged development along Jerome Avenue, and led to the growth of the surrounding communities. The city government took over the IRT's operations on June 12, 1940. On October 23, 1952, a motorman died when his empty train collided with another empty train at the station.

=== Later years ===
In 2006, work began on a $55 million contract to renovate five stops on the line to bring them into a state of good repair. As part of the project, station mezzanines were refurbished, electrical upgrades were completed, and platform floors, canopy roofs, and windscreens were replaced. In addition, fluorescent lighting was installed. Work on the project was completed in phases so as to reduce inconveniences to riders. On October 30, 2006, the northbound platform at Mosholu Parkway closed for three months to be renovated. Work on the southbound platform was to begin in summer 2007. As part of the project, the southern entrance to the station was reopened.

From June 8, 2009 to June 26, 2009, four morning rush-hour trains operated express in the southbound direction in a pilot program by New York City Transit, stopping at Burnside Avenue and 149th Street–Grand Concourse before resuming the normal express route at 125th Street. Although Mosholu Parkway is not designed as an express station, the trains used a switch for the express track south of the station. From October 26, 2009 to December 11, 2009, a second pilot program had five southbound 4 trains running express in the AM rush hour.

In May 2018, New York City Transit Authority President Andy Byford announced his plan subway and bus modernization plan, known as Fast Forward, which included making an additional 50 stations compliant with the Americans with Disabilities Act of 1990 during the 2020–2024 Metropolitan Transportation Authority (MTA) Capital Program to allow most riders to have an accessible station every two or three stops. The draft 2020–2024 Capital Program released in September 2019, included 66 stations that would receive ADA improvements, including Mosholu Parkway. In November 2022, the MTA announced that it would award a $965 million contract for the installation of 21 elevators across eight stations, including Mosholu Parkway which received 2 brand new elevators (1 street-to-mezzanine-to-northbound platform outside fare control and 1 mezzanine-to-southbound platform inside fare control). A joint venture of ASTM and Halmar International constructed the elevators under a public-private partnership, and the elevators were opened in late August 2025.

== Station layout ==
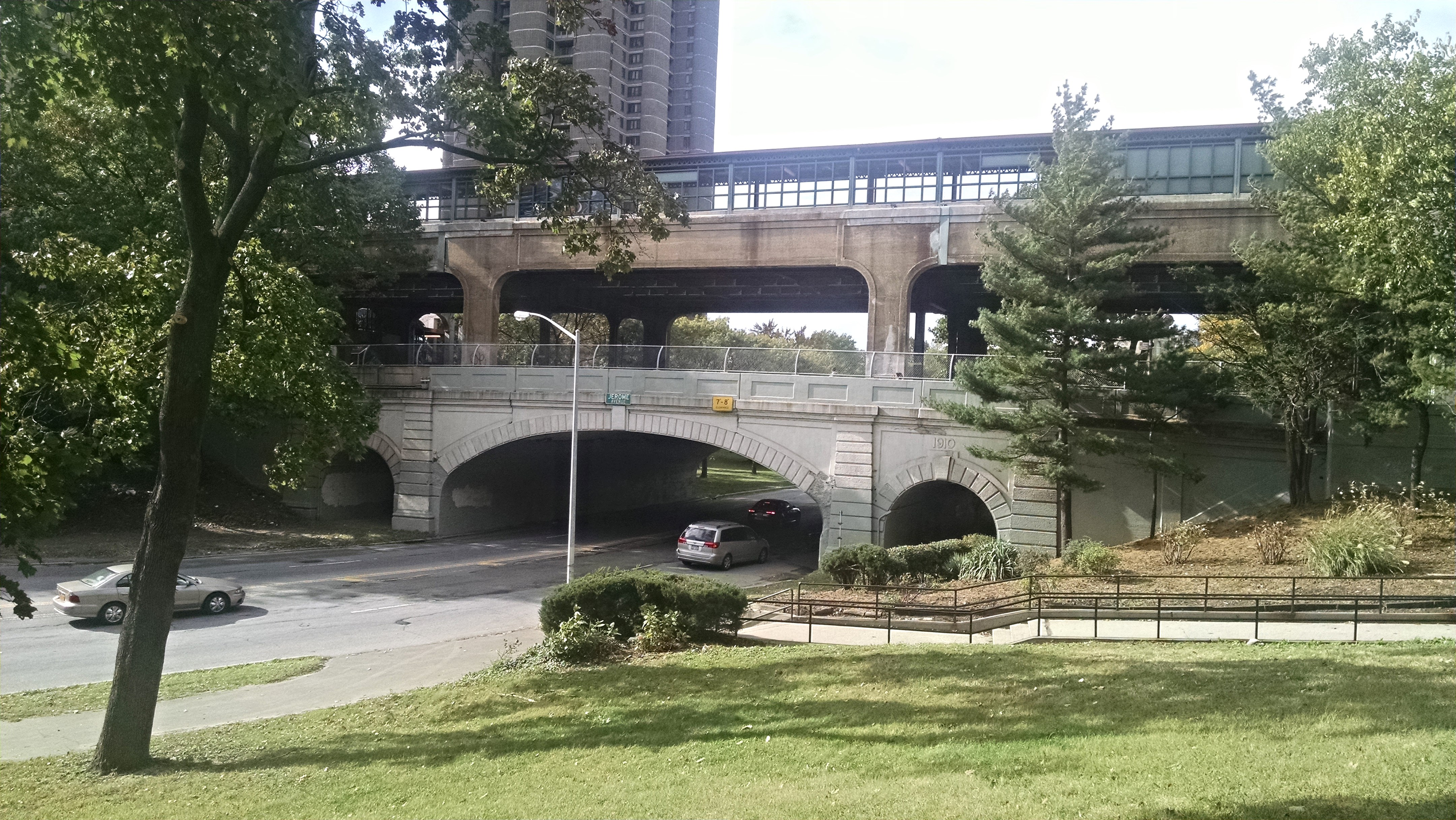
Station seen from Mosholu Parkway

This elevated station has three tracks and two side platforms. The 4 stops here at all times. The middle track, which starts just north of the station, is generally not used in revenue service. South of this station is a track connection from Jerome Yard to all three tracks in the southbound direction only. A renovation removed two mosaics on each platform and opened the portion of the station's walls that span the parkway.

=== Exits ===
The station has two mezzanines located underneath the platforms, on the north and south sides of Mosholu Parkway between its service roadways. The mezzanines are made of brick. Station exits from each mezzanine lead to either side of Jerome Avenue. The southern mezzanine was expanded as part of the 2020s ADA project. There is an elevator connecting the southern mezzanine to the northbound platform and ground level, located outside fare control. Another elevator, connecting the mezzanine to the southbound platform, is inside fare control.
