= Mount Eden Avenue station =

New York City Subway station in the Bronx

Mount Eden Avenue
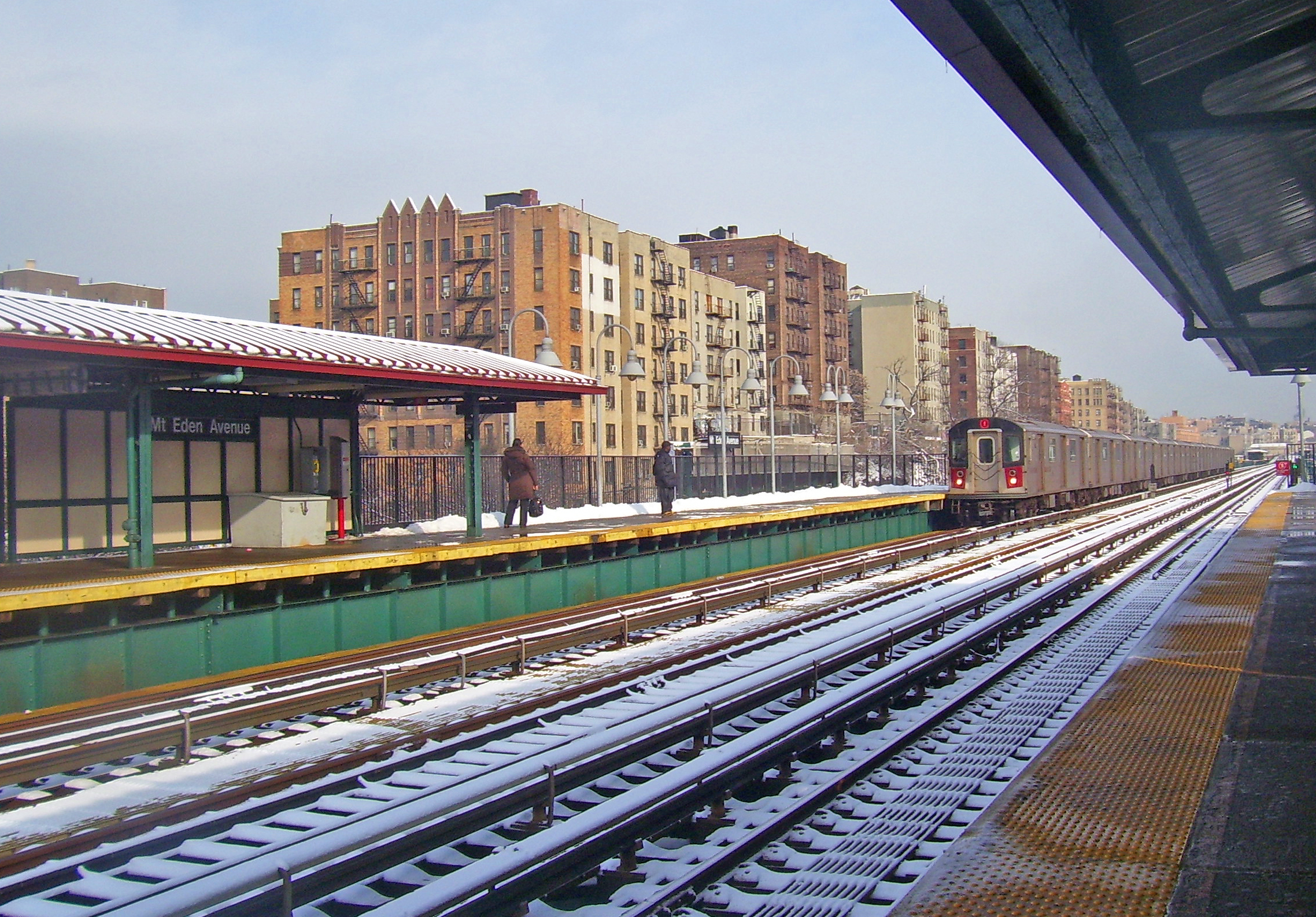
- Southbound R142 4 train arriving

Station statistics
- Address: Mount Eden Avenue & Jerome Avenue; Bronx, New York
- Borough: The Bronx
- Locale: Tremont, Morris Heights
- Coordinates: 40.844268°N 73.914814°W
- Division: A (IRT)
- Line: IRT Jerome Avenue Line
- Services: 4 (all times)
- Structure: Elevated
- Platforms: 2 side platforms
- Tracks: 3

Other information
- Opened: June 2, 1917; 109 years ago

Traffic
- 2025: 996,963 ▲5.6%
- Rank: 312 out of 423
Services
Preceding station	New York City Subway	Following station
176th Street toward Woodlawn	4 (New York City Subway service)	170th Street toward Crown Heights–Utica Avenue
Location
Location within New York City Subway
Location within New York City
Location within New York
Track layout
Street map
Station service legend
Symbol	Description
Stops all times	Stops all times

The Mount Eden Avenue station is a local station on the IRT Jerome Avenue Line of the New York City Subway. Located at the intersection of Mount Eden and Jerome Avenues in the Tremont and Morris Heights neighborhoods of the Bronx, it is served by the 4 train at all times. This station was constructed by the Interborough Rapid Transit Company as part of the Dual Contracts and opened in 1917.

== History ==
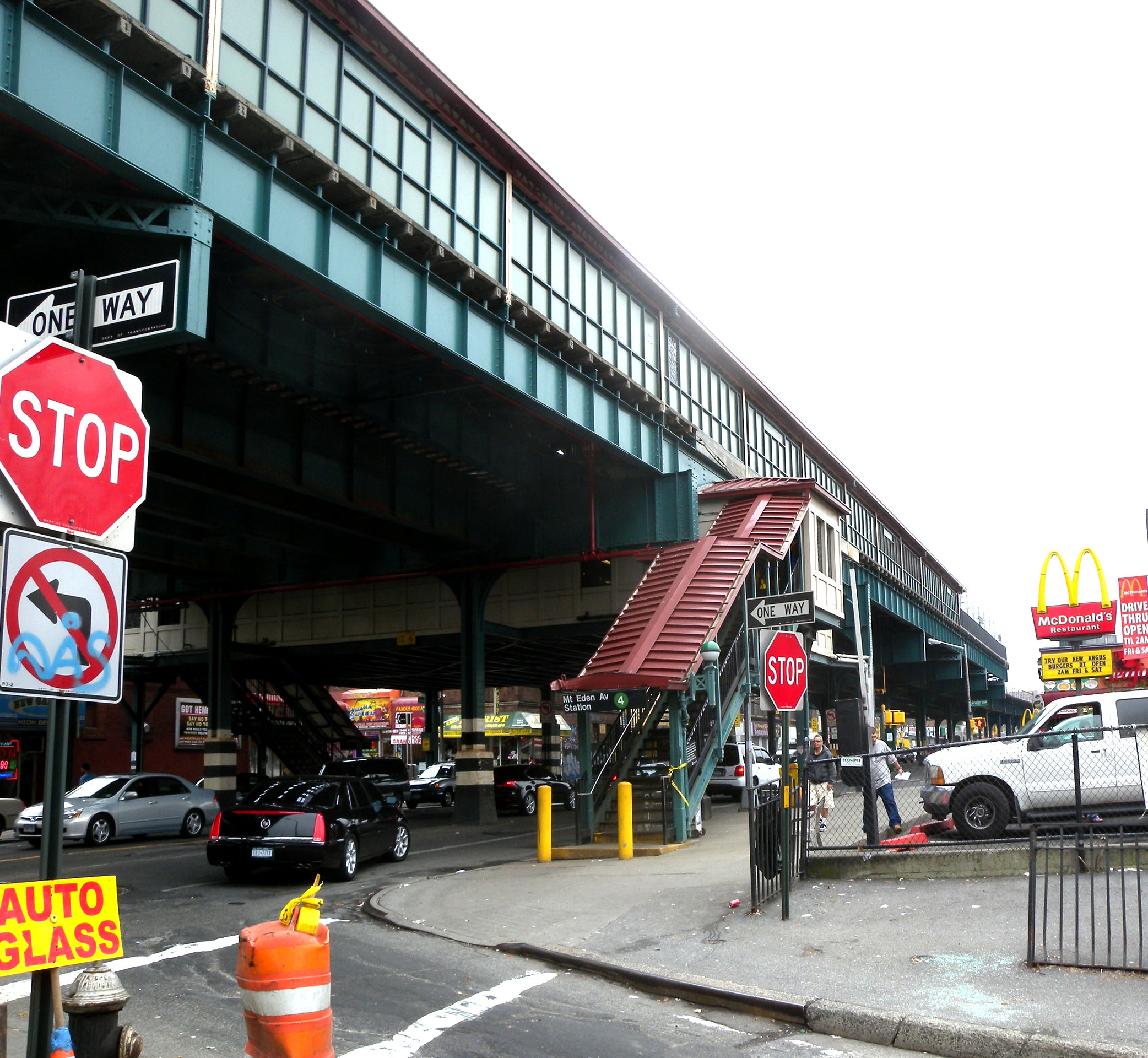
Eastern street stairs

The Dual Contracts, which were signed on March 19, 1913, were contracts for the construction and/or rehabilitation and operation of rapid transit lines in the City of New York. The contracts were "dual" in that they were signed between the City and two separate private companies (the Interborough Rapid Transit Company and the Brooklyn Rapid Transit Company), all working together to make the construction of the Dual Contracts possible. The Dual Contracts promised the construction of several lines in the Bronx. As part of Contract 3, the IRT agreed to build an elevated line along Jerome Avenue in the Bronx.

Mount Eden Avenue station opened as part of the initial section of the line to Kingsbridge Road on June 2, 1917. Service was initially operated as a shuttle between Kingsbridge Road and 149th Street. Through service to the IRT Lexington Avenue Line began on July 17, 1918. The line was completed with a final extension to Woodlawn on April 15, 1918. This section was initially served by shuttle service, with passengers transferring at 167th Street. The construction of the line encouraged development along Jerome Avenue, and led to the growth of the surrounding communities. The city government took over the IRT's operations on June 12, 1940.

This station was rehabilitated in 2004 with new canopies and windscreens.

A shooting occurred at the station on February 12, 2024, killing one person and injuring five.

== Station layout ==
This elevated station has three tracks and two side platforms. The center express track is used by select rush-hour 4 trains. The 4 stops here at all times.

The original IRT-era signs are painted over and covered up with more contemporary Helvetica signs.

The 2006 artwork here is called The Procession of Folk, No. 3 by Amir Bey. It consists of several stained glass windows inset within the windscreens.

=== Exits ===
The station house is directly underneath the platforms and tracks. It has two staircases going up to each platform, a waiting area/crossunder, turnstile bank, token booth, and two street stairs going down to the northern corners of Mount Eden and Jerome Avenues. The eastern staircase faces south while the western one faces north.
