= 176th Street station =

New York City Subway station in the Bronx

176 Street
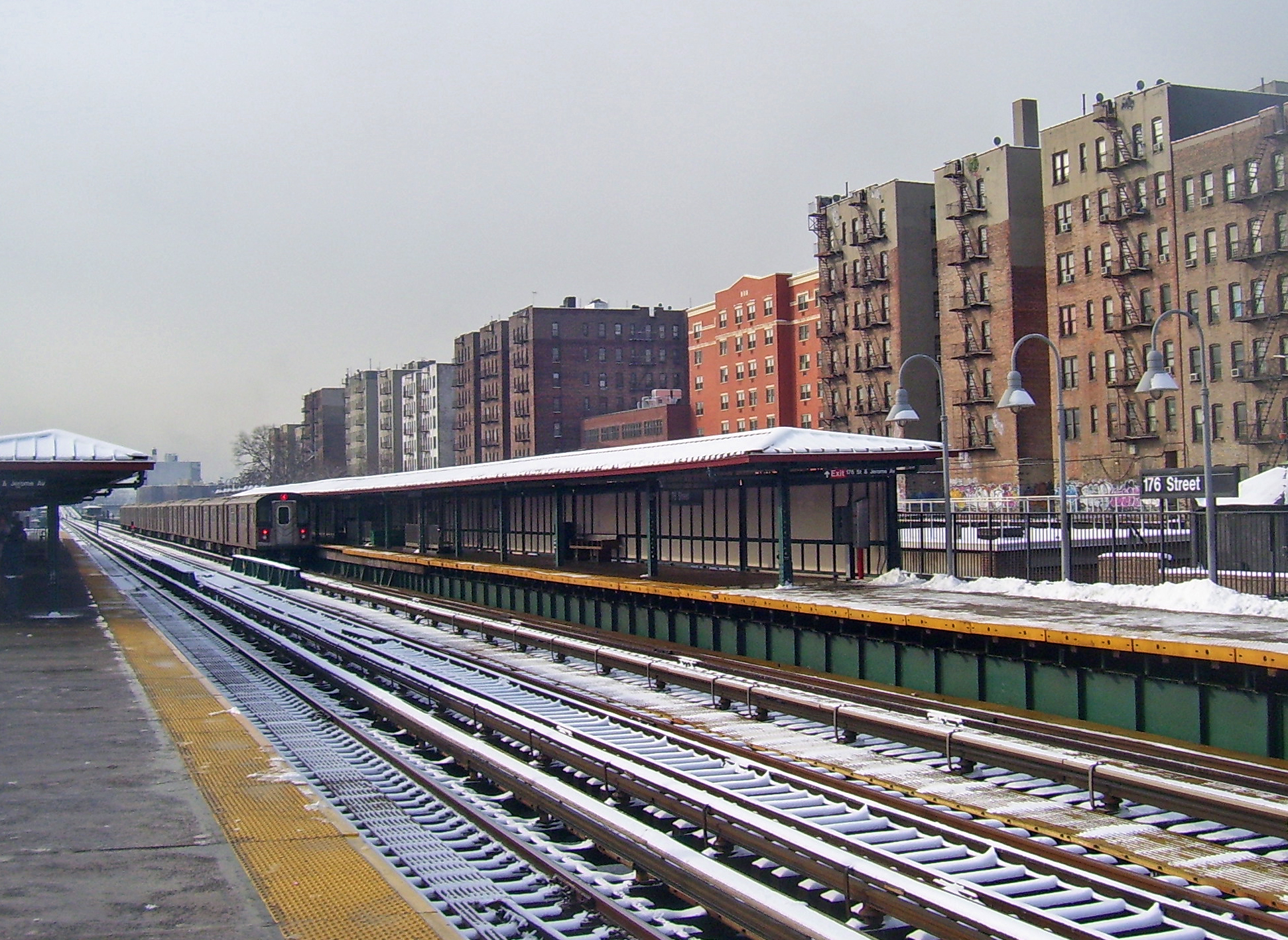
- View south from northbound platform, with southbound R142 4 train leaving

Station statistics
- Address: 176th Street & Jerome Avenue; Bronx, New York
- Borough: The Bronx
- Locale: Morris Heights, Tremont, Mount Hope
- Coordinates: 40.848619°N 73.911767°W
- Division: A (IRT)
- Line: IRT Jerome Avenue Line
- Services: 4 (all times)
- Transit: NYCT Bus: Bx32
- Structure: Elevated
- Platforms: 2 side platforms
- Tracks: 3

Other information
- Opened: June 2, 1917 (109 years ago)

Traffic
- 2025: 1,208,068 ▲14.3%
- Rank: 275 out of 423
Services
Preceding station	New York City Subway	Following station
Burnside Avenue toward Woodlawn	4 (New York City Subway service)	Mount Eden Avenue toward Crown Heights–Utica Avenue
Location
Location within New York City Subway
Location within New York City
Location within New York
Track layout
Street map
Station service legend
Symbol	Description
Stops all times	Stops all times

The 176th Street station is a local station on the IRT Jerome Avenue Line of the New York City Subway. Located at the intersection of 176th Street and Jerome Avenue in the Morris Heights and Tremont neighborhoods of the Bronx, it is served by the 4 train at all times. This station was constructed by the Interborough Rapid Transit Company as part of the Dual Contracts and opened in 1917.

== History ==
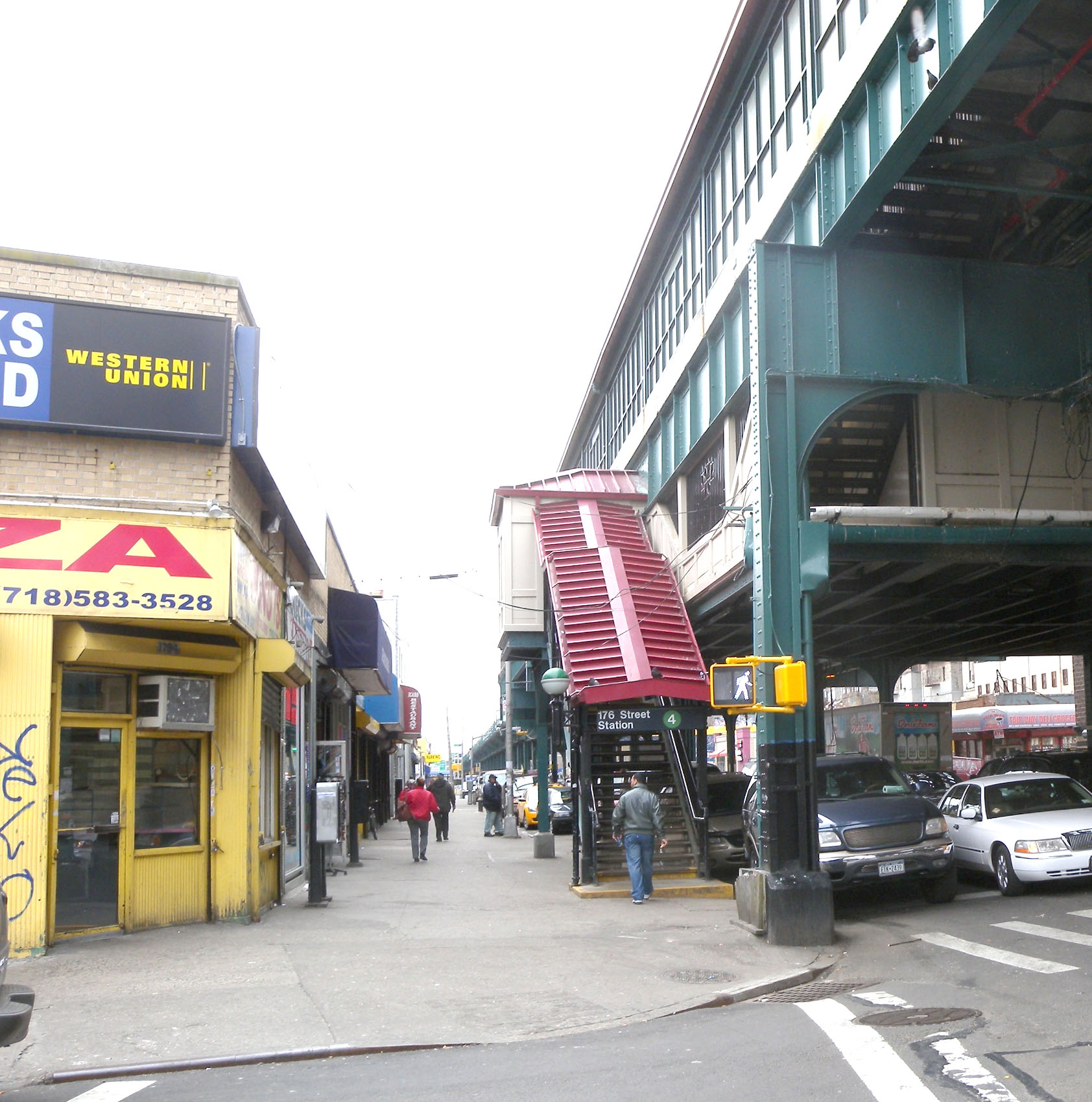
Street stair

The Dual Contracts, which were signed on March 19, 1913, were contracts for the construction and/or rehabilitation and operation of rapid transit lines in the City of New York. The contracts were "dual" in that they were signed between the City and two separate private companies (the Interborough Rapid Transit Company and the Brooklyn Rapid Transit Company), all working together to make the construction of the Dual Contracts possible. The Dual Contracts promised the construction of several lines in the Bronx. As part of Contract 3, the IRT agreed to build an elevated line along Jerome Avenue in the Bronx.

176th Street station opened as part of the initial section of the line to Kingsbridge Road on June 2, 1917. Service was initially operated as a shuttle between Kingsbridge Road and 149th Street. Through service to the IRT Lexington Avenue Line began on July 17, 1918. The line was completed with a final extension to Woodlawn on April 15, 1918. This section was initially served by shuttle service, with passengers transferring at 167th Street. The construction of the line encouraged development along Jerome Avenue, and led to the growth of the surrounding communities. The city government took over the IRT's operations on June 12, 1940.

On July 5, 2004, this station, 170th Street, and Fordham Road closed for four months so they could be renovated. As part of the project, new canopy roofs, walls, lighting, staircases, floors, and a public address system would be installed at each station.

== Station layout ==
This elevated station has three tracks with two side platforms. The 4 stops here at all times.

The station has old style signs painted over and covered up with new style signs, and features new fare control railings as a crossunder.

The 2006 artwork here is called Reaching Out For Each Other by Juan Sánchez. It features stained glass windows on the platform windscreens and station house that each feature a hand as a central element to depict their use as a universal language.

=== Exits ===
The fare control is in a mezzanine below the tracks. Outside fare control, stairs lead to either southwest corner of Jerome Avenue and 176th Street.
