= Bedford Park Boulevard–Lehman College station =

New York City Subway station in the Bronx

Bedford Park Blvd– Lehman College
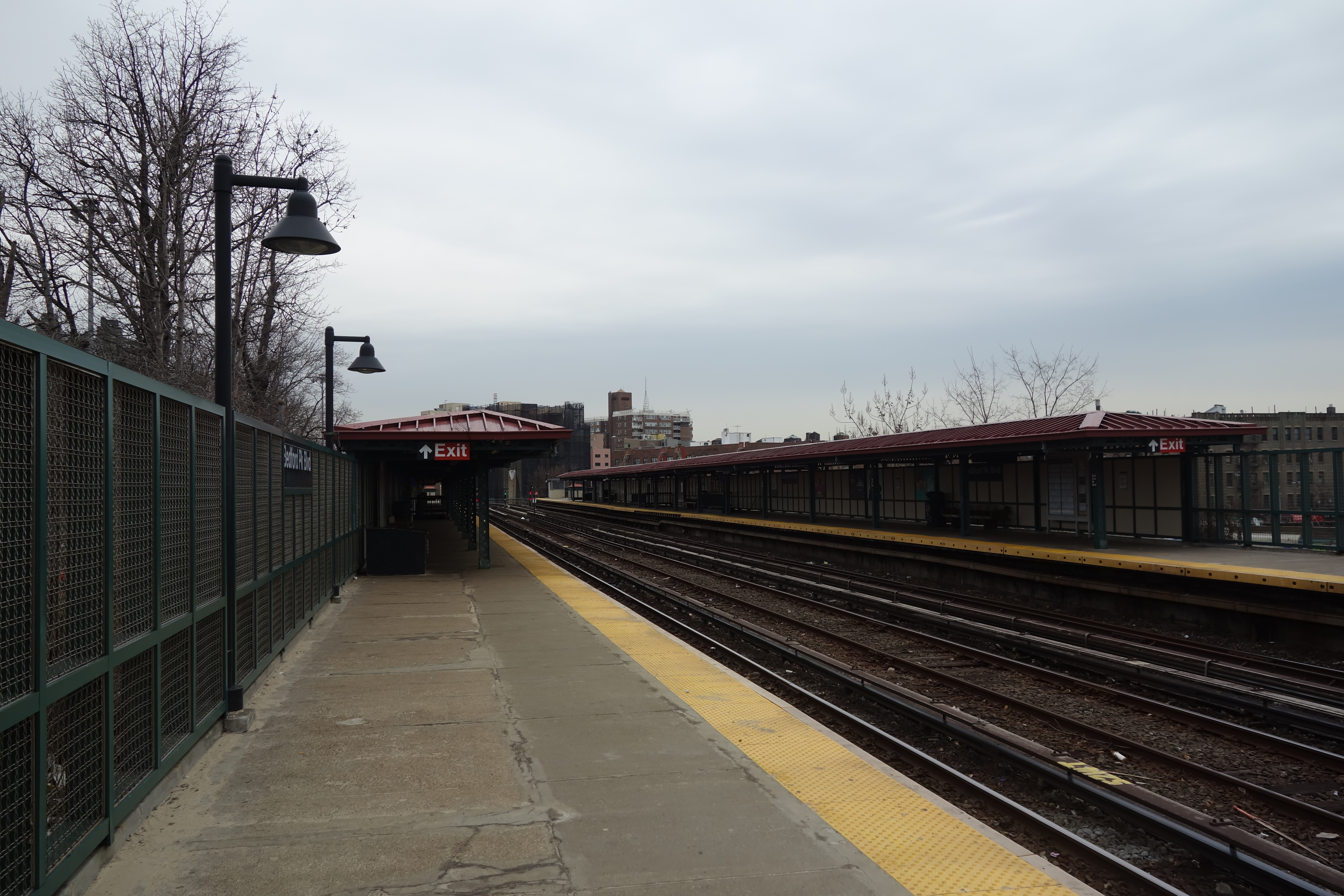
- Platform view looking north

Station statistics
- Address: Bedford Park Boulevard (200th Street) & Jerome Avenue; Bronx, New York
- Borough: The Bronx
- Locale: Bedford Park, Kingsbridge Heights
- Coordinates: 40.873545°N 73.889837°W
- Division: A (IRT)
- Line: IRT Jerome Avenue Line
- Services: 4 (all times)
- Transit: NYCT Bus: Bx10, Bx25, Bx26, Bx28; Bee-Line Bus: 4, 20, 21
- Structure: Elevated
- Platforms: 2 side platforms
- Tracks: 3 (2 in regular service)

Other information
- Opened: April 15, 1918; 108 years ago
- Former/other names: Bedford Park Boulevard–200th Street; Bedford Park Boulevard

Traffic
- 2025: 1,094,935 ▲1%
- Rank: 293 out of 423
Services
Preceding station	New York City Subway	Following station
Mosholu Parkway toward Woodlawn	4 (New York City Subway service)	Kingsbridge Road toward Crown Heights–Utica Avenue
Location
Location within New York City Subway
Location within New York City
Location within New York
Track layout
Street map
Station service legend
Symbol	Description
Stops all times	Stops all times

The Bedford Park Boulevard–Lehman College station (formerly Bedford Park Boulevard–200th Street station and signed as Bedford Park Boulevard) is a local station on the IRT Jerome Avenue Line of the New York City Subway. Located at the intersection of Bedford Park Boulevard (formerly 200th Street) immediately west of Jerome Avenue in the Bedford Park neighborhood of the Bronx, it is served by the 4 train at all times. It is also the only station on the Jerome Avenue Line north of 170th Street that is not located above Jerome Avenue. This station was constructed by the Interborough Rapid Transit Company as part of the Dual Contracts and opened in 1918.

== History ==
=== Construction and opening ===
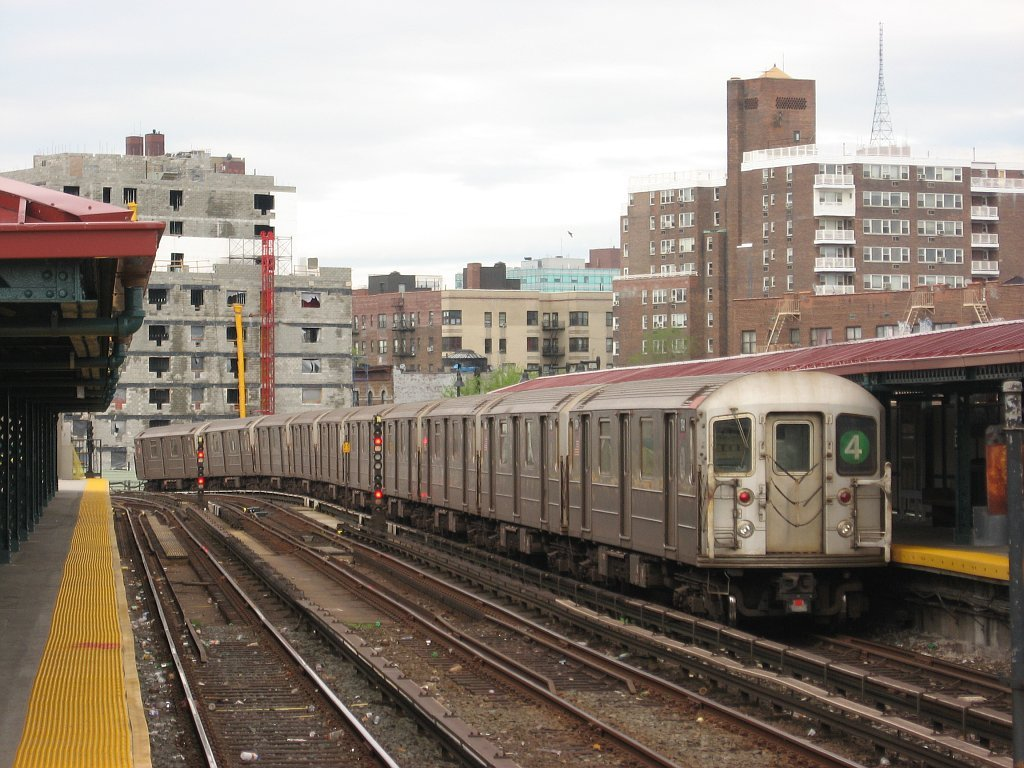
4 train leaving the station

The Dual Contracts, which were signed on March 19, 1913, were contracts for the construction and/or rehabilitation and operation of rapid transit lines in the City of New York. The contracts were "dual" in that they were signed between the City and two separate private companies (the Interborough Rapid Transit Company and the Brooklyn Rapid Transit Company), all working together to make the construction of the Dual Contracts possible. The Dual Contracts promised the construction of several lines in the Bronx. As part of Contract 3, the IRT agreed to build an elevated line along Jerome Avenue in the Bronx. In April 1915, the New York Public Service Commission voted to change the planned name of the station from 200th Street to Bedford Park Boulevard.

The first part of the line opened on June 2, 1917 as a shuttle service between Kingsbridge Road and 149th Street, in advance of through service to the IRT Lexington Avenue Line, which began on July 17, 1918. Bedford Park Boulevard–200th Street station opened on April 15, 1918 as part of the final extension of the IRT Jerome Avenue Line from Kingsbridge Road to Woodlawn. This section was initially served by shuttle service, with passengers transferring at 167th Street. The construction of the line encouraged development along Jerome Avenue, and led to the growth of the surrounding communities. The city government took over the IRT's operations on June 12, 1940.

=== Later years ===
This station was renovated in the Summer–Fall 2006. During this time, the street level mezzanine area and the platforms were renovated. The platforms had yellow tactile edge warning strips installed, and the IRT directional tablets inside fare control have been preserved. Until the 2006 renovation, the downtown platform had several old small 200 signs behind a chain-link fence toward the front of the platform; however, they were removed.

Until renovations in 2006, it was the only station in the entire subway system and along the IRT Jerome Avenue Line to have a barbed wire fence on a platform–the Manhattan bound platform. This was added in an earlier renovation from the 1980s with the intent of preventing graffiti artists from tagging the 4 train. The barbed wire fence was completely removed from the Manhattan-bound platform during renovations.

From October 26, 2009 to December 11, 2009, a pilot program had five southbound 4 trains running express in the AM rush hour. Although Bedford Park Boulevard is not designed as an express station, the trains used a switch for the express track south of the station.

== Station layout ==
The elevated station has three tracks and two side platforms. The 4 stops here at all times.

The middle track is generally not used in revenue service. The Jerome Yard/Concourse Yard complex is located on the west of the station. The track connections to Jerome Yard are at the north end. Concourse Yard has a single track connected to the southbound local; south of the station. The Concourse Yard serves as one of the few interconnections between the IRT and IND divisions.

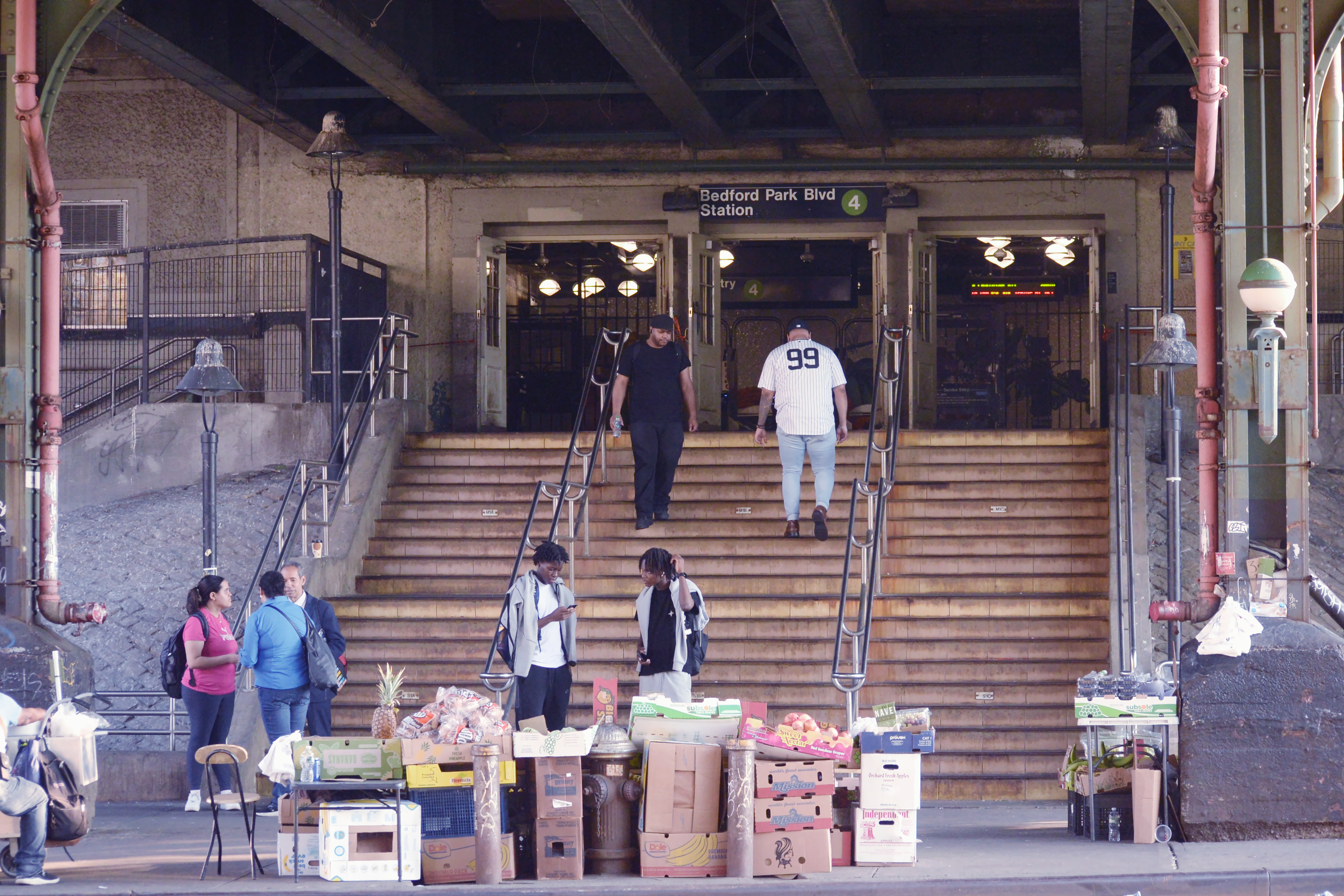
Station entrance beneath the elevated tracks

=== Exits ===
The station building is at street level with the tracks above the building due to the street layout. The station has a brick mezzanine and stairway walls with "BPB" and restroom mosaics in the station house. A storeroom is located on the landing of the stairs to the platforms. Walking to the east connects to the New York Botanical Garden and a Metro-North Railroad station of the same name, and walking to the west around the yard complex connects to Lehman College and the Bronx High School of Science.

== Nearby points of interest ==
- Bronx High School of Science
- Lehman College
- High School of American Studies at Lehman College
- New York Botanical Garden
