= 170th Street station (IRT Jerome Avenue Line) =

New York City Subway station in the Bronx

170 Street
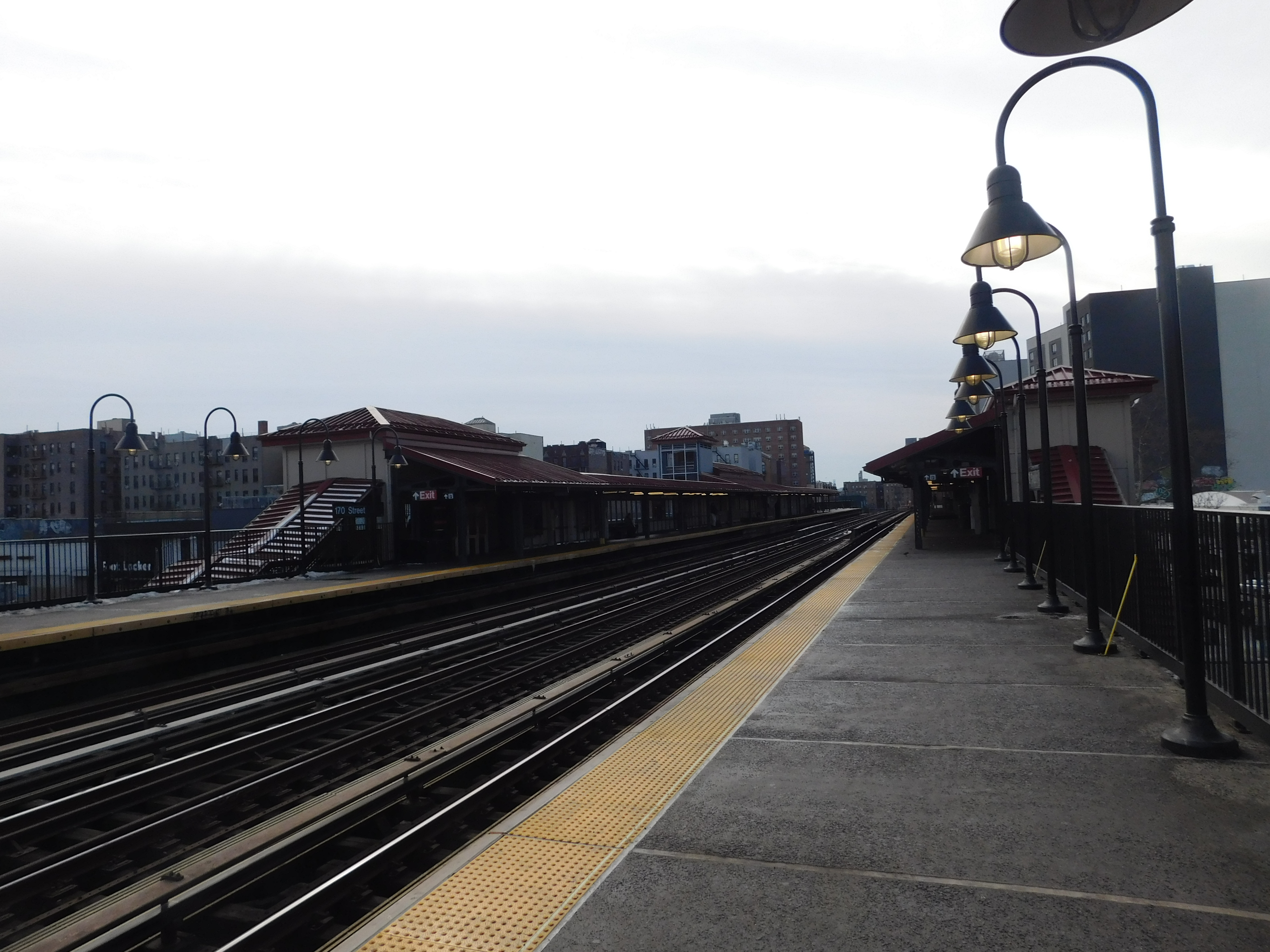
- View from the southbound platform

Station statistics
- Address: 170th Street & Jerome Avenue; Bronx, New York
- Borough: The Bronx
- Locale: Tremont, Mount Eden, Highbridge
- Coordinates: 40.840178°N 73.917732°W
- Division: A (IRT)
- Line: IRT Jerome Avenue Line
- Services: 4 (all times)
- Transit: NYCT Bus: Bx11, Bx18A/B
- Structure: Elevated
- Platforms: 2 side platforms
- Tracks: 3

Other information
- Opened: June 2, 1917 (109 years ago)
- Accessible: Yes

Traffic
- 2025: 1,603,276 ▲14.3%
- Rank: 220 out of 423
Services
Preceding station	New York City Subway	Following station
Mount Eden Avenue toward Woodlawn	4 (New York City Subway service)	167th Street toward Crown Heights–Utica Avenue
Location
Location within New York City Subway
Location within New York City
Location within New York
Track layout
Street map
Station service legend
Symbol	Description
Stops all times	Stops all times

The 170th Street station is a local station on the IRT Jerome Avenue Line of the New York City Subway. Located at the intersection of 170th Street and Jerome Avenue in the Highbridge and Tremont neighborhoods of the Bronx, it is served by the 4 train at all times. This station was constructed by the Interborough Rapid Transit Company as part of the Dual Contracts and opened in 1917.

== History ==
=== Construction and opening ===
The Dual Contracts, which were signed on March 19, 1913, were contracts for the construction and/or rehabilitation and operation of rapid transit lines in the City of New York. The contracts were "dual" in that they were signed between the city and two separate private companies (the Interborough Rapid Transit Company and the Brooklyn Rapid Transit Company), all working together to make the construction of the Dual Contracts possible. The Dual Contracts promised the construction of several lines in the Bronx. As part of Contract 3, the IRT agreed to build an elevated line along Jerome Avenue in the Bronx.

170th Street station opened as part of the initial section of the line to Kingsbridge Road on June 2, 1917. Service was initially operated as a shuttle between Kingsbridge Road and 149th Street. Through service to the IRT Lexington Avenue Line began on July 17, 1918. The line was completed with a final extension to Woodlawn on April 15, 1918. This section was initially served by shuttle service, with passengers transferring at 167th Street. The construction of the line encouraged development along Jerome Avenue, and led to the growth of the surrounding communities. The city government took over the IRT's operations on June 12, 1940.

=== Station renovations ===
On July 5, 2004, this station, 176th Street, and Fordham Road closed for four months so they could be renovated. As part of the project, new canopy roofs, walls, lighting, staircases, floors, and a public address system would be installed at each station.

As part of the 2015–2019 Metropolitan Transportation Authority (MTA) Capital Program, elevators were installed at the original entrance between the street and the mezzanine, as well as between the mezzanine and the platforms. The elevators make the station fully compliant with accessibility guidelines under the Americans with Disabilities Act of 1990. Construction began in July 2020 and was completed in January 2022.

== Station layout ==
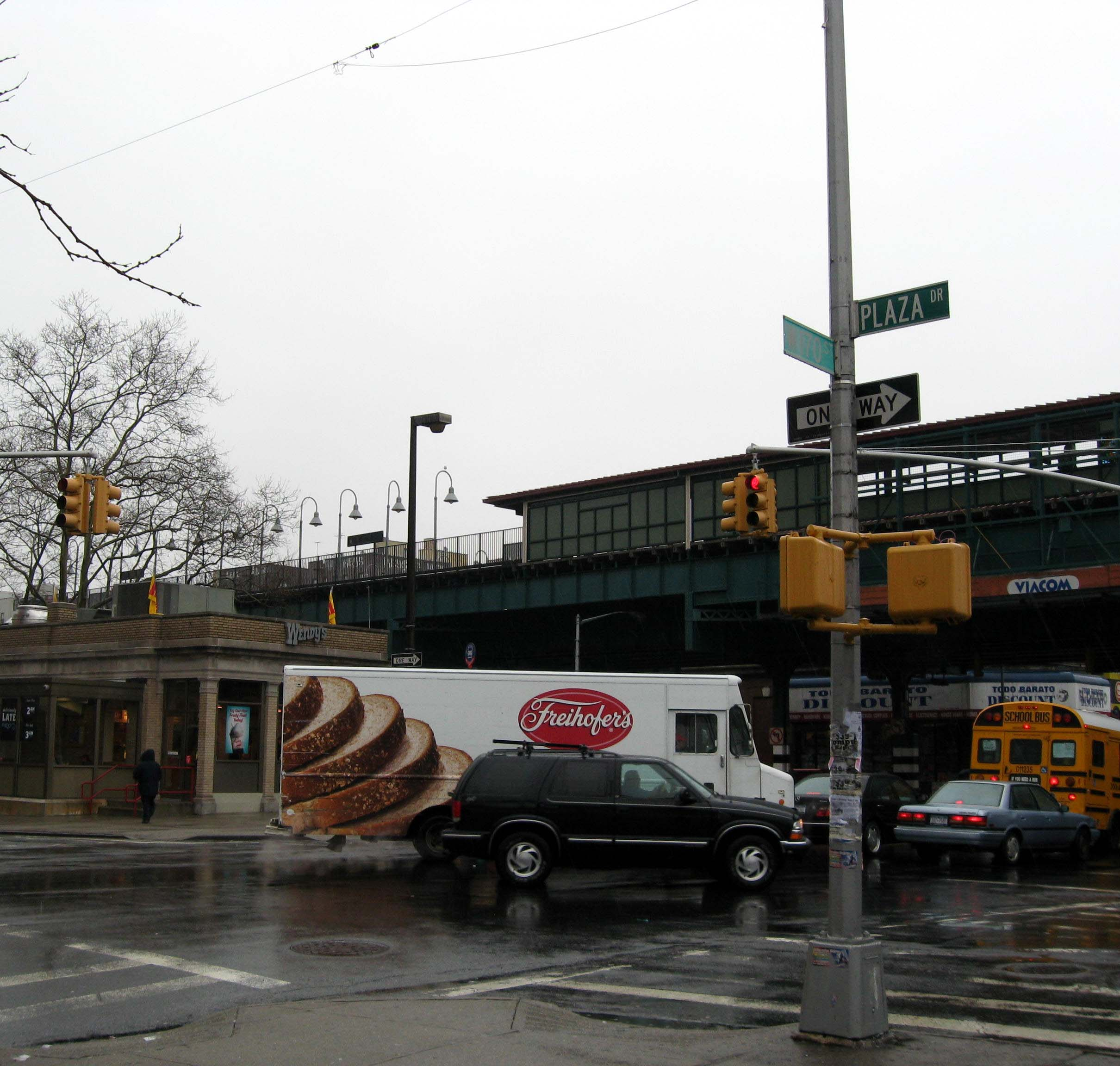
Western side view from street

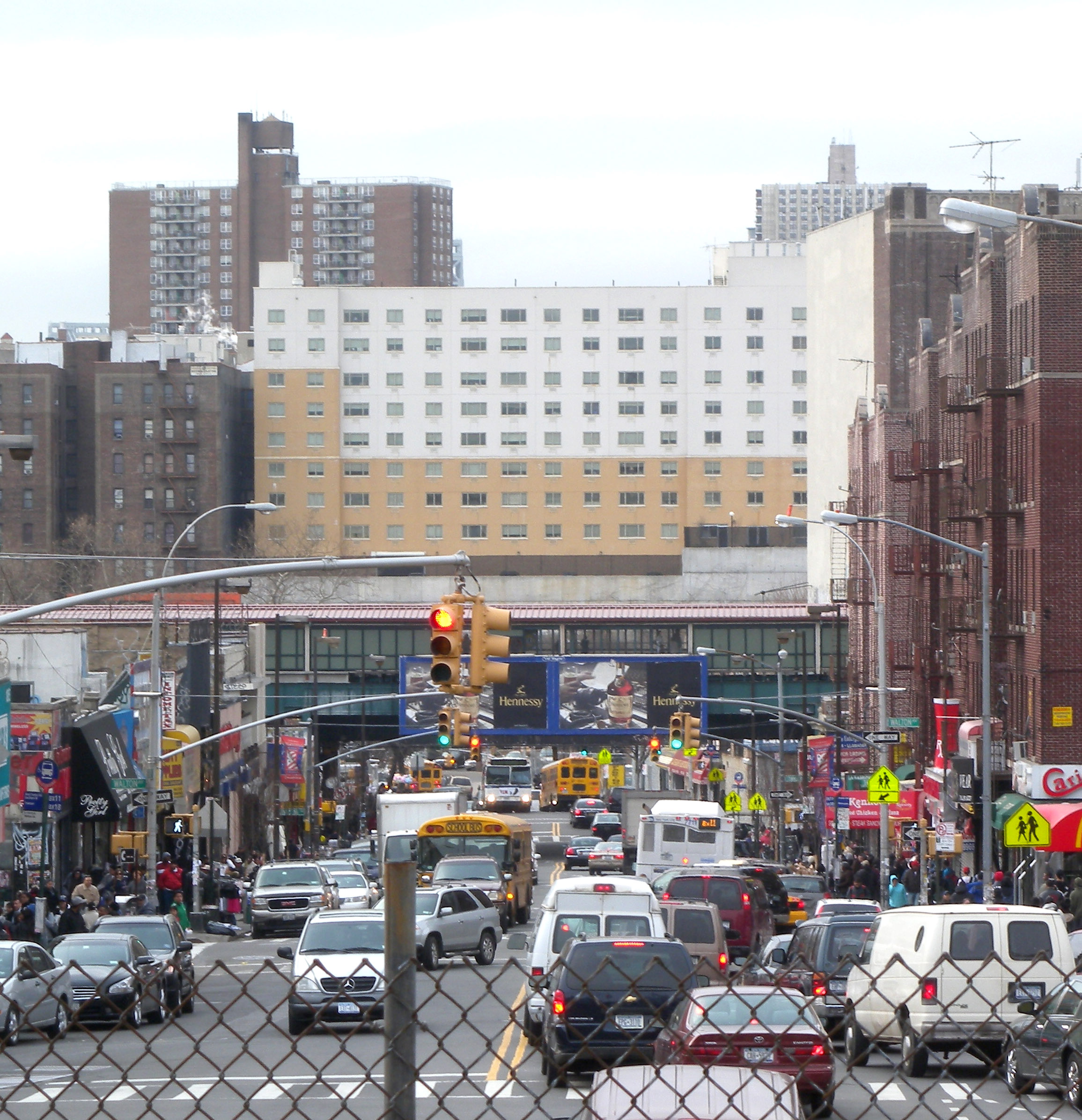
Eastern side as seen from west of Grand Concourse

This elevated station has three tracks and two side platforms. The 4 stops here at all times.

Both platforms have beige windscreens, mesh fences, and red canopies with green frames and support columns in the center, and white steel waist-level fences at either ends with white lampposts at regular intervals.

The 2005 artwork here is called Views from Above by Dina Bursztyn. It features stained glass windows on the platform windscreens and station house based on Bursztyn's experience on riding elevated trains.

=== Exits ===
The station's main entrance/exit is an elevated station house beneath the tracks. Inside the fare control area, it has two staircases to each platform at the center and a waiting area that allows a free transfer between directions. Outside fare control, it has a turnstile bank, a token booth, and three street stairs going down to either side of Jerome Avenue between 170th Street and Elliot Place, two to the east side and one to the west. The elevator goes to the east side of Jerome Avenue.

Each platform has a secondary fare control area leading to either northern corner of 170th Street and Jerome Avenue, with one staircase from the southbound platform going to the northwestern corner, and the other from the northbound platform going to the northeastern corner, although each of them is signed as an exit to Macombs Road. The staircase from the southbound platform opened in January 2021, while the staircase from the northbound platform opened in April 2021.
