= Kingsbridge Road station (IRT Jerome Avenue Line) =

New York City Subway station in the Bronx

Kingsbridge Road
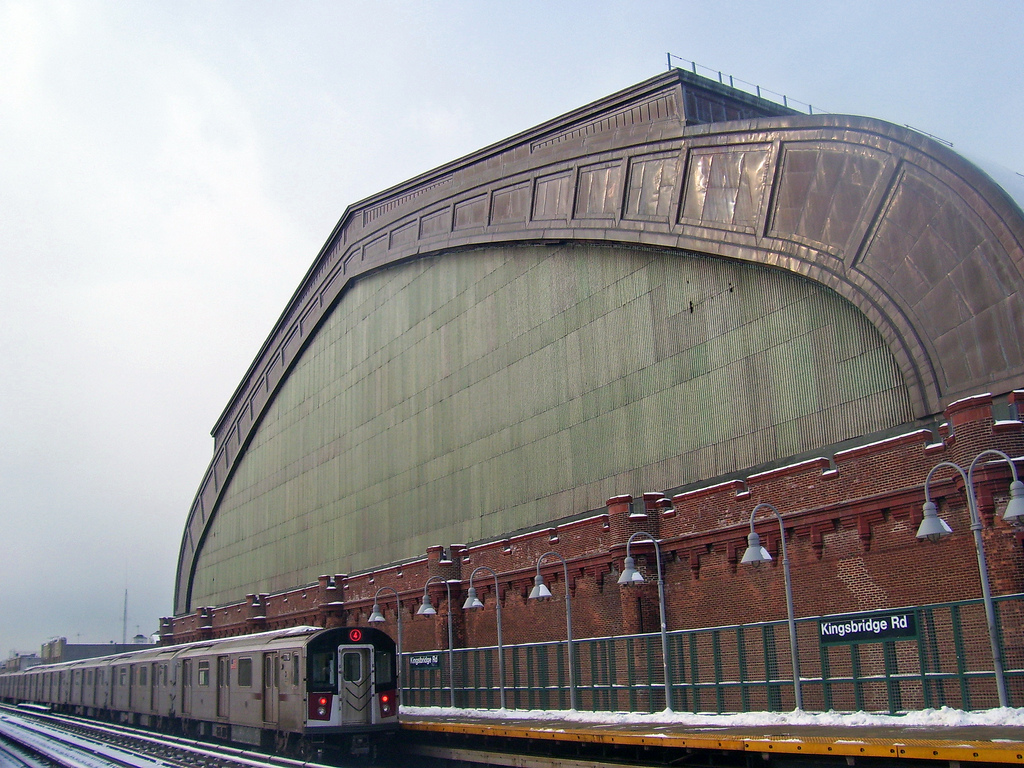
- R142A 4 train leaving the southbound platform, with Kingsbridge Armory on the background

Station statistics
- Address: Kingsbridge Road & Jerome Avenue; Bronx, New York
- Borough: The Bronx
- Locale: Kingsbridge Heights, Fordham
- Coordinates: 40°52′04″N 73°53′50″W
- Division: A (IRT)
- Line: IRT Jerome Avenue Line
- Services: 4 (all times)
- Transit: NYCT Bus: Bx9, Bx22, Bx28, Bx32
- Structure: Elevated
- Platforms: 2 side platforms
- Tracks: 3 (2 in regular service)

Other information
- Opened: June 2, 1917; 109 years ago
- Accessible: No; under construction

Traffic
- 2025: 1,875,531 ▲10.5%
- Rank: 188 out of 423
Services
Preceding station	New York City Subway	Following station
Bedford Park Boulevard–Lehman College toward Woodlawn	4 (New York City Subway service)	Fordham Road toward Crown Heights–Utica Avenue
Location
Location within New York City Subway
Location within New York City
Location within New York
Track layout
Street map
Station service legend
Symbol	Description
Stops all times	Stops all times

The Kingsbridge Road station is a local station on the elevated IRT Jerome Avenue Line of the New York City Subway. Located at the intersection of Kingsbridge Road and Jerome Avenue in the Kingsbridge Heights and Fordham neighborhoods of the Bronx, it is served by the 4 train at all times. The station is adjacent to the Kingsbridge Armory. It was constructed by the Interborough Rapid Transit Company as part of the Dual Contracts and opened in 1917.

== History ==
=== Construction and opening ===
The Dual Contracts, which were signed on March 19, 1913, were contracts for the construction and/or rehabilitation and operation of rapid transit lines in the City of New York. The contracts were "dual" in that they were signed between the City and two separate private companies (the Interborough Rapid Transit Company and the Brooklyn Rapid Transit Company), all working together to make the construction of the Dual Contracts possible. The Dual Contracts promised the construction of several lines in the Bronx. As part of Contract 3, the IRT agreed to build an elevated line along Jerome Avenue in the Bronx.

Kingsbridge Road station opened as the northern terminal of the initial section of the line on June 2, 1917. Service was initially operated as a shuttle between Kingsbridge Road and 149th Street, and only the southbound platform was in use at this station. Through service to the IRT Lexington Avenue Line began on July 17, 1918. This station ceased to be the terminal of the line with the opening of the final extension to Woodlawn on April 15, 1918. This section was initially served by shuttle service, with passengers transferring at 167th Street. The construction of the line encouraged development along Jerome Avenue, and led to the growth of the surrounding communities. The city government took over the IRT's operations on June 12, 1940.

=== Later years ===
In May 2018, New York City Transit Authority President Andy Byford announced his plan subway and bus modernization plan, known as Fast Forward, which included making an additional 50 stations compliant with the Americans with Disabilities Act of 1990 during the 2020–2024 Metropolitan Transportation Authority (MTA) Capital Program to allow most riders to have an accessible station every two or three stops. The draft 2020–2024 Capital Program released in September 2019 included 66 stations that would receive ADA improvements. In December, the MTA announced that an additional twenty stations, including Kingsbridge Road, would be made ADA-accessible as part of the Capital Program. In May 2024, the Federal Transit Administration awarded the MTA $157 million for accessibility renovations at five stations, including Kingsbridge Road. The funds would be used to add elevators, signs, and public-announcement systems, as well as repair platforms and stairs, at each station.

== Station layout ==
The station has three tracks and two side platforms. The 4 stops here at all times. The middle track is generally not used in revenue service. It is a typical IRT elevated station. The Kingsbridge Armory rises immediately to the west of the station.

=== Exits ===
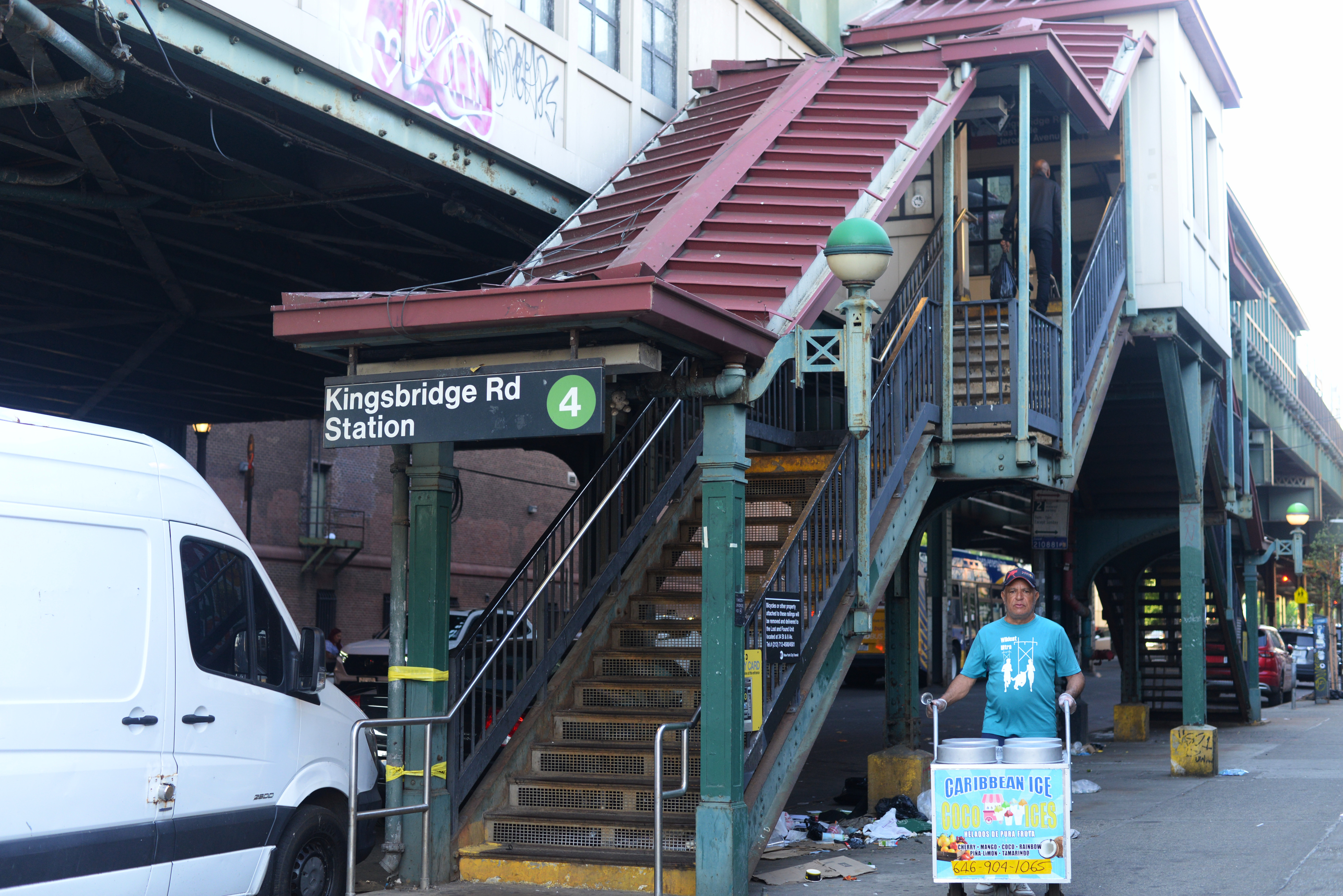
Entrance staircase

The station has a wooden mezzanine under the tracks. Exit stairs go to both northern corners of Jerome Avenue and Kingsbridge Road. There are two stairs to the northeast corner and two to the northwest.
