= 14th Street station (IRT Ninth Avenue Line) =

Former Manhattan Railway elevated station (closed 1940)

14th St.

General information
- Location: West 14th Street and 9th Avenue; New York, NY; Midtown Manhattan, Manhattan
- Coordinates: 40°44′27.46″N 74°0′19.54″W
- System: Former Manhattan Railway elevated station
- Operator: Interborough Rapid Transit Company
- Line: Ninth Avenue Line
- Platforms: 4 side platforms (2 on each level)
- Tracks: 3 (1 upper level; 2 lower level)

Construction
- Structure type: Elevated
- Platform levels: 2

History
- Opened: October 21, 1873; 153 years ago
- Closed: June 11, 1940; 86 years ago

Former services
Preceding station	Interborough Rapid Transit	Following station
34th Street toward Burnside Avenue	Ninth Avenue Express	Christopher Street toward Rector Street
23rd Street toward 155th Street	Ninth Avenue Local	Christopher Street toward South Ferry
Location

The 14th Street station was an express station on the demolished IRT Ninth Avenue Line in Manhattan, New York City. It had two levels. The lower level was built first and had two tracks and two side platforms. The upper level was built as part of the Dual Contracts and had one track and two side platforms over the lower level local tracks. It closed on June 11, 1940. The next southbound stop was Christopher Street for express and local trains. The next northbound local stop was 23rd Street. The next northbound express stop was 34th Street.
