= 34th Street station (IRT Ninth Avenue Line) =

Former Manhattan Railway elevated station (closed 1940)

34th St.
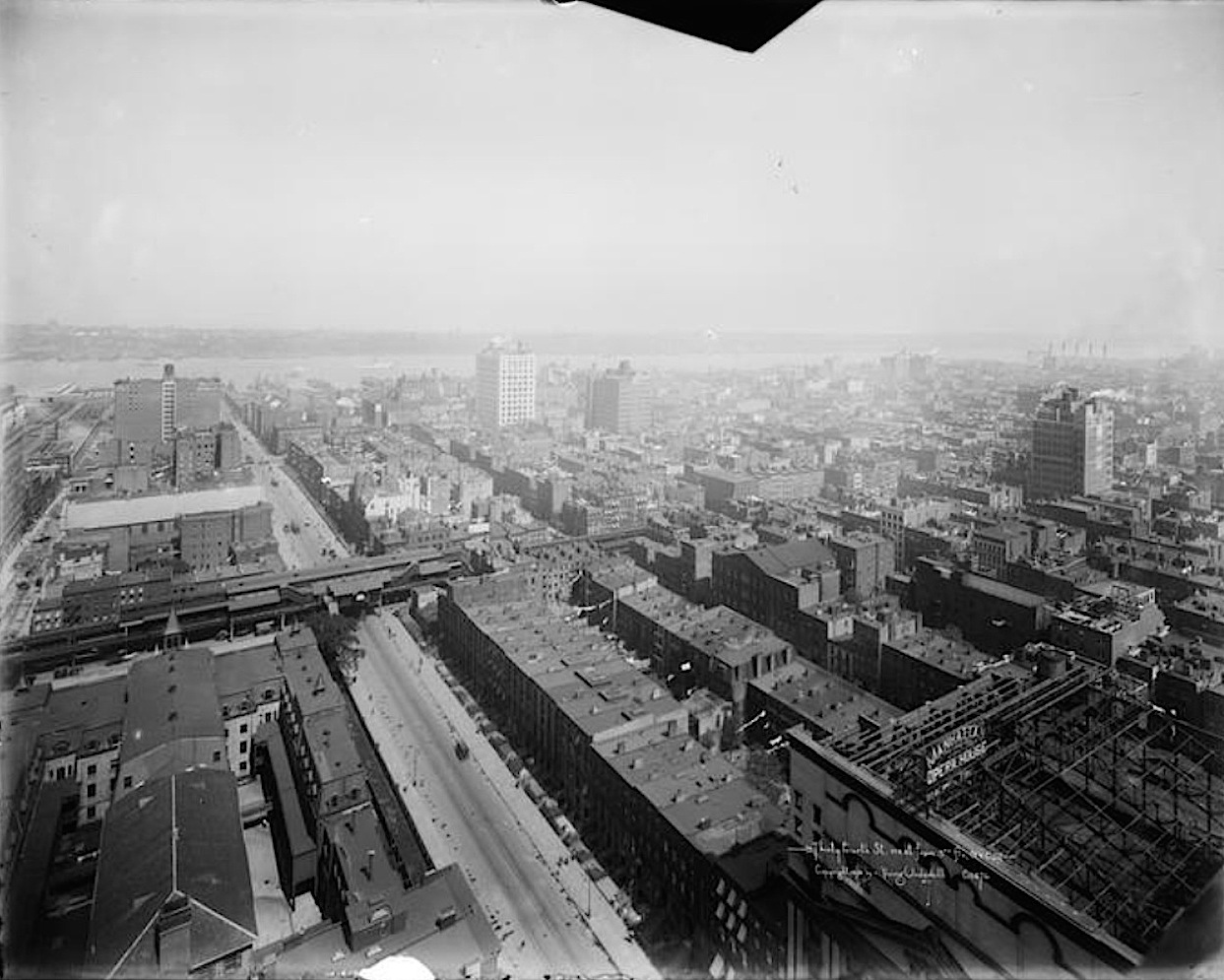
- Looking below towards the west at the 34th Street station in 1918, from a skyscraper on Eighth Avenue.

General information
- Location: West 34th Street and 9th Avenue; New York, NY; Midtown Manhattan, Manhattan
- Coordinates: 40°45′12.22″N 73°59′46.77″W
- System: Former Manhattan Railway elevated station
- Operator: Interborough Rapid Transit Company
- Line: Ninth Avenue Line
- Platforms: 4 side platforms (2 on each level)
- Tracks: 3 (1 upper level; 2 lower level)

Construction
- Structure type: Elevated
- Platform levels: 2

History
- Opened: July 30, 1873; 153 years ago
- Closed: June 11, 1940; 86 years ago

Former services
| Preceding station | Interborough Rapid Transit | Following station |
|---|---|---|
| 66th Street toward Burnside Avenue | Ninth Avenue Express | 14th Street toward Rector Street |
| 42nd Street toward 155th Street | Ninth Avenue Local | 30th Street toward South Ferry |
Location

The 34th Street station was an express station on the demolished IRT Ninth Avenue Line in Manhattan, New York City. It was originally built on July 30, 1873 by the New York Elevated Railroad Company, and had two levels. The lower level was built first and had two tracks and two side platforms. The upper level was built as part of the Dual Contracts and had one track and two side platforms over the lower level local tracks. It closed on June 11, 1940. This station also serviced Penn Station and was west of the IRT and IND subway stations at Penn Station.

== History ==
In April 1930, a new stairway at the station was opened to the northeast corner of Ninth Avenue and 34th Street.
