= 23rd Street station (IRT Ninth Avenue Line) =

Former Manhattan Railway elevated station (closed 1940)

23rd St.

General information
- Location: West 23rd Street and 9th Avenue; New York, NY; Midtown Manhattan, Manhattan
- Coordinates: 40°44′47″N 74°00′05″W
- System: Former Manhattan Railway elevated station
- Operator: Interborough Rapid Transit Company
- Line: Ninth Avenue Line
- Platforms: 2 side platforms
- Tracks: 3 (1 upper level; 2 lower level)

Construction
- Structure type: Elevated

History
- Opened: October 21, 1873; 153 years ago
- Closed: June 11, 1940; 86 years ago

Former services
Preceding station	Interborough Rapid Transit	Following station
30th Street toward 155th Street	Ninth Avenue Local	14th Street toward South Ferry
Location

The 23rd Street station was a local station on the demolished IRT Ninth Avenue Line in Manhattan, New York City. It had two levels. The lower level was built first and had two tracks and two side platforms. The upper level was built as part of the Dual Contracts and had one track that served express trains that bypassed the station. It opened on October 21, 1873 and closed on June 11, 1940. The next southbound stop was 14th Street. The next northbound stop was 30th Street.
