= 30th Street station (IRT Ninth Avenue Line) =

Former Manhattan Railway elevated station (closed 1940)

30th St.

General information
- Location: West 30th Street and 9th Avenue; New York, NY; Midtown Manhattan, Manhattan
- Coordinates: 40°45′3.15″N 73°59′53.32″W
- System: Former Manhattan Railway elevated station
- Operator: Interborough Rapid Transit Company
- Line: Ninth Avenue Line
- Platforms: 2 side platforms
- Tracks: 3 (1 upper level; 2 lower level)

Construction
- Structure type: Elevated

History
- Opened: December 13, 1873; 152 years ago
- Closed: June 11, 1940; 86 years ago

Former services
| Preceding station | Interborough Rapid Transit | Following station |
|---|---|---|
| 34th Street toward 155th Street | Ninth Avenue Local | 23rd Street toward South Ferry |
Location

The 30th Street station was a local station on the demolished IRT Ninth Avenue Line in Manhattan, New York City. It was opened on December 13, 1873 as the replacement for the original northern terminus of the Ninth Avenue Line at 29th Street, which was built in 1868 The station which was originally built by the New York Elevated Railroad Company had two levels. The lower level was built first and had two tracks and two side platforms. The upper level was built as part of the Dual Contracts and had one track that served express trains that bypassed the station. It closed on June 11, 1940. The next southbound stop was 23rd Street. The next northbound stop was 34th Street.
