= 81st Street station (IRT Ninth Avenue Line) =

Former Manhattan Railway elevated station (closed 1940)

81st St.

General information
- Location: West 81st Street and Columbus Avenue; New York, NY; Upper West Side, Manhattan
- Coordinates: 40°46′59.67″N 73°58′28.31″W
- System: Former Manhattan Railway elevated station
- Operator: Interborough Rapid Transit Company
- Line: Ninth Avenue Line
- Platforms: 2 side platforms
- Tracks: 3 (1 upper level; 2 lower level)

Construction
- Structure type: Elevated

History
- Opened: June 9, 1879; 147 years ago
- Closed: June 11, 1940; 86 years ago

Former services
Preceding station	Interborough Rapid Transit	Following station
86th Street toward 155th Street	Sixth Avenue	72nd Street toward South Ferry
86th Street toward 155th Street	Ninth Avenue Local	72nd Street toward South Ferry
Location

The 81st Street station was a local station on the demolished IRT Ninth Avenue Line in Manhattan, New York City. It had two levels. The lower level was built first and had two tracks and two side platforms and served local trains. The upper level was built as part of the Dual Contracts and had one track that served express trains that bypassed this station. It closed on June 11, 1940. The next southbound stop was 72nd Street. The next northbound stop was 86th Street.
