= 130th Street station =

Former Manhattan Railway elevated station (closed 1940)

130th St.

General information
- Location: West 130th Street and Frederick Douglass Boulevard; New York, NY; Manhattanville, Manhattan
- Coordinates: 40°48′48.12″N 73°56′55.88″W
- System: Former Manhattan Railway elevated station
- Operator: Interborough Rapid Transit Company
- Line: Ninth Avenue Line
- Platforms: 2 side platforms
- Tracks: 3 (1 upper level; 2 lower level)

History
- Opened: September 17, 1879; 147 years ago
- Closed: June 11, 1940; 86 years ago

Former services
Preceding station	Interborough Rapid Transit	Following station
135th Street toward 155th Street	Sixth Avenue	125th Street toward South Ferry
135th Street toward 155th Street	Ninth Avenue Local	125th Street toward South Ferry
Location

The 130th Street station was a local station on the demolished IRT Ninth Avenue Line in Manhattan, New York City. It had two levels. The lower level was built first and had two tracks and two side platforms and served local trains. The upper level was built as part of the Dual Contracts and had one track that served express trains that bypassed this station. It opened on September 17, 1879, and closed on June 11, 1940. The next southbound stop was 125th Street. The next northbound stop was 135th Street.
