= 116th Street station (IRT Ninth Avenue Line) =

Former Manhattan Railway elevated station (closed 1940)

116th St.
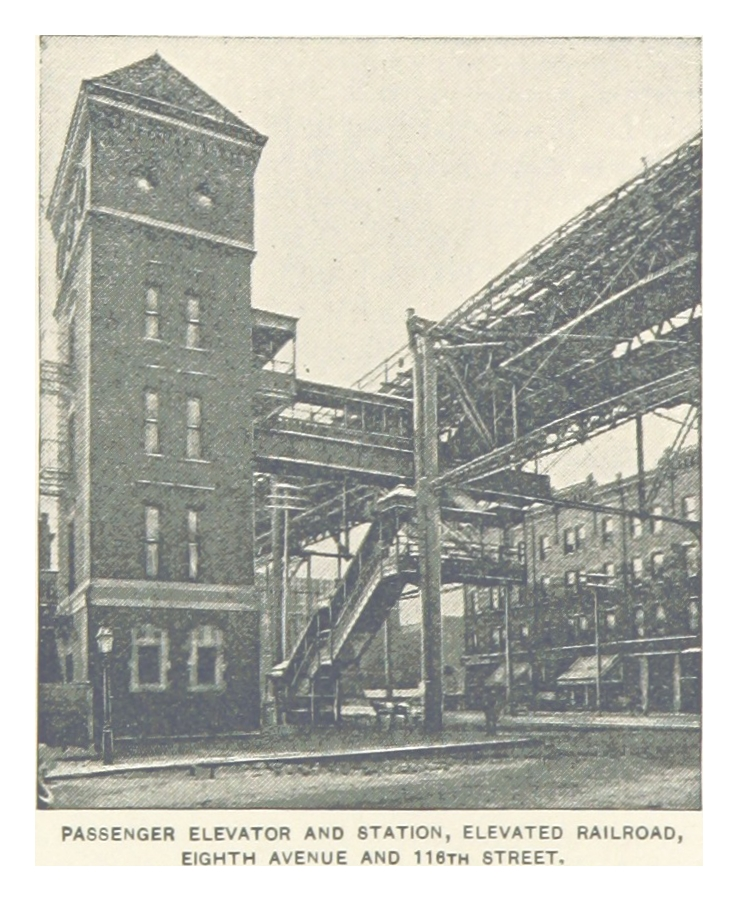
- 1893

General information
- Location: West 116th Street and Frederick Douglass Boulevard; New York, NY; Central Harlem, Manhattan
- Coordinates: 40°48′15.77″N 73°57′19.29″W
- System: Former Manhattan Railway elevated station
- Operator: Interborough Rapid Transit Company
- Line: Ninth Avenue Line
- Platforms: 2 island platforms
- Tracks: 3

History
- Opened: September 17, 1879; 147 years ago
- Closed: June 11, 1940; 86 years ago

Former services
Preceding station	Interborough Rapid Transit	Following station
125th Street toward Burnside Avenue	Ninth Avenue Express	66th Street toward Rector Street
125th Street toward 155th Street	Sixth Avenue	110th Street toward South Ferry
125th Street toward 155th Street	Ninth Avenue Local	110th Street toward South Ferry
Location

The 116th Street station was an express station on the demolished IRT Ninth Avenue Line in Manhattan, New York City. It had three tracks and two island platforms. It opened on September 17, 1879, and closed on June 11, 1940. The next southbound local stop was 104th Street station until June 3, 1903, and then 110th Street. The next southbound express stop was 66th Street. The next northbound stop was 125th Street for all trains. The express run from this stop to 66th Street was the longest express segment out of all New York City elevated lines, bypassing seven local stations.
