= 104th Street station (IRT Ninth Avenue Line) =

Former Manhattan Railway elevated station (closed 1940)

104th St.

General information
- Location: West 104th Street and Columbus Avenue; New York, NY; Upper West Side, Manhattan
- Coordinates: 40°47′52.47″N 73°57′49.88″W
- System: Former Manhattan Railway elevated station
- Operator: Interborough Rapid Transit Company
- Line: Ninth Avenue Line
- Platforms: 2 side platforms
- Tracks: 3 (1 upper level; 2 lower level)

History
- Opened: June 21, 1879; 147 years ago
- Closed: June 11, 1940; 86 years ago

Former services
Preceding station	Interborough Rapid Transit	Following station
110th Street toward 155th Street	Sixth Avenue	99th Street toward South Ferry
110th Street toward 155th Street	Ninth Avenue Local	99th Street toward South Ferry
Location

The 104th Street station was a local station on the demolished IRT Ninth Avenue Line in Manhattan, New York City. It had two levels. The lower level was built first and had two tracks and two side platforms and served local trains. The upper level was built as part of the Dual Contracts and had one track that served express trains that bypassed this station. It opened on June 21, 1879, and closed on June 11, 1940. The next southbound stop was 99th Street. The next northbound stop was 116th Street station until June 3, 1903, and then 110th Street. This had a view of the "Suicide Curve" at 110th Street.
