= 145th Street station (IRT Ninth Avenue Line) =

Former Manhattan Railway elevated station (closed 1940)

145th St.

General information
- Location: West 145th Street and Frederick Douglass Boulevard; New York, NY; Harlem, Manhattan
- Coordinates: 40°49′22.25″N 73°56′30.86″W
- System: Former Manhattan Railway elevated station
- Operator: Interborough Rapid Transit Company
- Line: Ninth Avenue Line
- Platforms: 4 side platforms (2 on each level)
- Tracks: 3 (1 upper level; 2 lower level)

Construction
- Platform levels: 2

History
- Opened: December 1, 1879; 146 years ago
- Closed: June 11, 1940; 86 years ago

Former services
Preceding station	Interborough Rapid Transit	Following station
155th Street toward Burnside Avenue	Ninth Avenue Express	125th Street toward Rector Street
151st Street toward 155th Street	Sixth Avenue	140th Street toward South Ferry
151st Street toward 155th Street	Ninth Avenue Local	140th Street toward South Ferry
Location

The 145th Street station was an express station on the demolished IRT Ninth Avenue Line in Manhattan, New York City. It had 2 levels. The lower level was built first and had 2 tracks and 2 side platforms and served local trains. The upper level was built as part of the Dual Contracts and had 1 track and 2 side platforms over the local tracks that served express trains. The station opened on December 1, 1879 and closed on June 11, 1940. The next southbound local stop was 140th Street. The next southbound express stop was 125th Street. The next northbound local stop was 151st Street. The next northbound express stop was 155th Street.
