= 66th Street station (IRT Ninth Avenue Line) =

Former Manhattan Railway elevated station (closed 1940)

66th St.

General information
- Location: West 66th Street and Columbus Avenue; New York, NY; Upper West Side, Manhattan
- Coordinates: 40°46′24.96″N 73°58′53.71″W
- System: Former Manhattan Railway elevated station
- Operator: Interborough Rapid Transit Company
- Line: Ninth Avenue Line
- Platforms: 4 side platforms (2 on each level)
- Tracks: 3 (1 upper level; 2 lower level)

Construction
- Structure type: Elevated
- Platform levels: 2

History
- Opened: June 9, 1879; 147 years ago
- Closed: June 11, 1940; 86 years ago

Former services
Preceding station	Interborough Rapid Transit	Following station
116th Street toward Burnside Avenue	Ninth Avenue Express	34th Street toward Rector Street
72nd Street toward 155th Street	Sixth Avenue	59th Street toward South Ferry
72nd Street toward 155th Street	Ninth Avenue Local	59th Street toward South Ferry
Location

The 66th Street station was an express station on the demolished IRT Ninth Avenue Line in Manhattan, New York City. It had two levels. The lower level was built first and had two tracks and two side platforms. The upper level was built as part of the Dual Contracts and had one track and two side platforms over the lower level local tracks. The station closed on June 11, 1940. The next southbound local stop was 59th Street. The next southbound express stop was 34th Street for Ninth Avenue trains, and 50th Street for IRT Sixth Avenue Line express trains. The next northbound local stop was 72nd Street. The next northbound express stop was 116th Street. The express run from this stop to 116th Street was the longest express segment out of all New York City elevated lines, bypassing seven local stations.
