= 125th Street station (IRT Ninth Avenue Line) =

Former Manhattan Railway elevated station (closed 1940)

125th St.

General information
- Location: West 125th Street and Frederick Douglass Boulevard; New York, NY; Central Harlem, Manhattan
- Coordinates: 40°48′37″N 73°57′04″W
- System: Former Manhattan Railway elevated station
- Operator: Interborough Rapid Transit Company
- Line: Ninth Avenue Line
- Platforms: 2 island platforms
- Tracks: 3

History
- Opened: September 17, 1879; 147 years ago
- Closed: June 11, 1940; 86 years ago

Former services
Preceding station	Interborough Rapid Transit	Following station
145th Street toward Burnside Avenue	Ninth Avenue Express	116th Street toward Rector Street
130th Street toward 155th Street	Sixth Avenue	116th Street toward South Ferry
130th Street toward 155th Street	Ninth Avenue Local	116th Street toward South Ferry
Location

The 125th Street station was an express station on the demolished IRT Ninth Avenue Line in Manhattan, New York City. It had three tracks and two island platforms. It opened on September 17, 1879, and closed on June 11, 1940. The next southbound stop was 116th Street for all trains. The next northbound local stop was 130th Street. The next northbound express stop was 145th Street.
