= 151st Street station =

Former Manhattan Railway elevated station (closed 1940)

151st St.

General information
- Location: West 151st Street and Frederick Douglass Boulevard; New York, NY; Harlem, Manhattan
- Coordinates: 40°49′35.82″N 73°56′20.97″W
- System: Former Interborough Rapid Transit elevated station
- Operator: Interborough Rapid Transit Company
- Line: Ninth Avenue Line
- Platforms: 2 side platforms
- Tracks: 3 (1 upper level; 2 lower level)

History
- Opened: November 15, 1917; 109 years ago
- Closed: June 11, 1940; 86 years ago

Former services
Preceding station	Interborough Rapid Transit	Following station
155th Street Terminus	Sixth Avenue	145th Street toward South Ferry
155th Street Terminus	Ninth Avenue Local	145th Street toward South Ferry
Location

The 151st Street station was a local station on the demolished IRT Ninth Avenue Line in Manhattan, New York City. It had 2 levels. The lower level had two tracks and two side platforms and served local trains. The station was built as part of the Dual Contracts and had one track that served express trains that bypassed this station. The next stop to the north was 155th Street. The next stop to the south was 145th Street. The station opened on November 15, 1917 and closed on June 11, 1940.
