= 110th Street station (IRT Ninth Avenue Line) =

Former Manhattan Railway elevated station (closed 1940)

110th St.
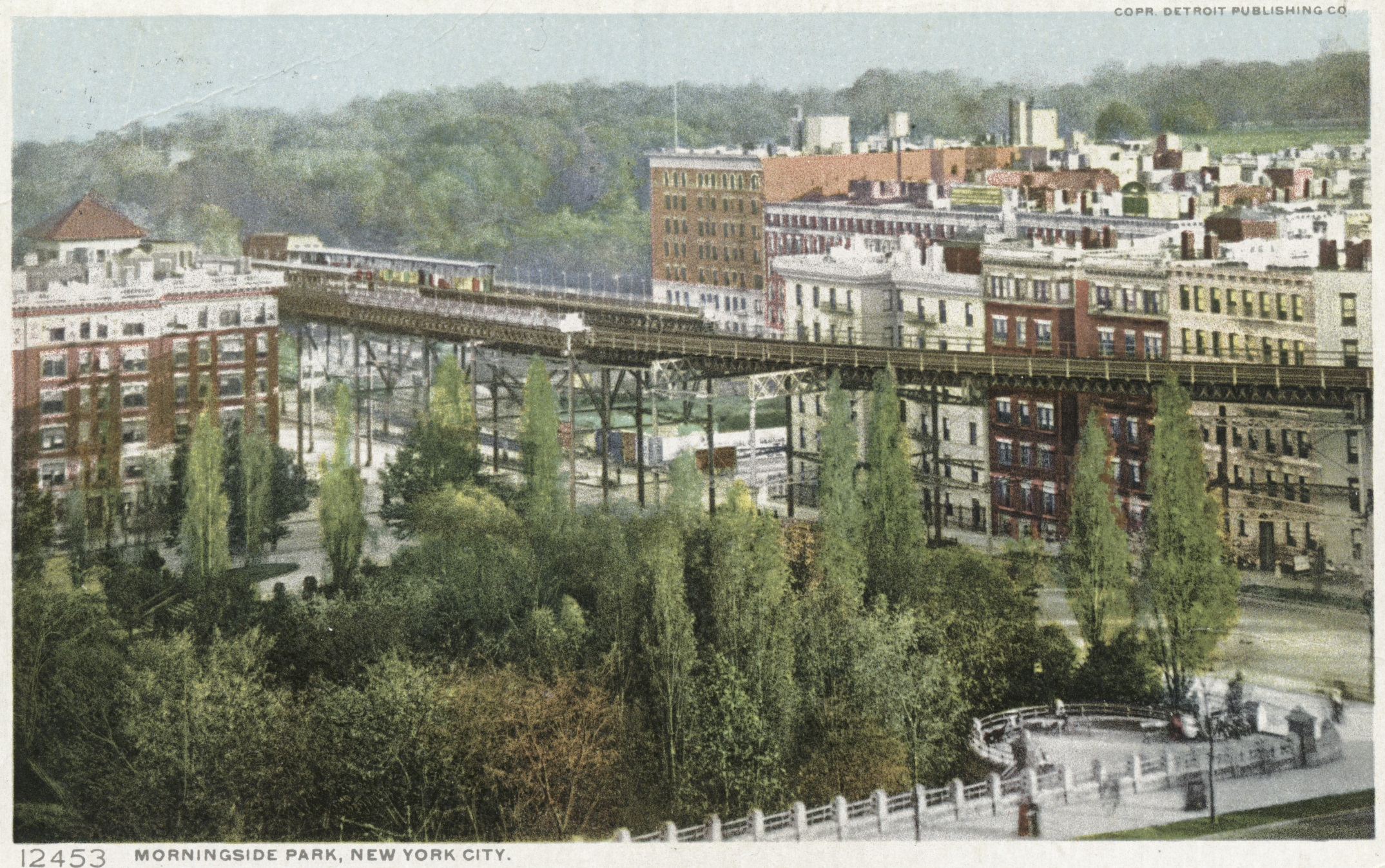
- 110th Street station's suicide curve looking south from Morningside Park with the station platforms and the elevator tower’s peaked roof visible on the left.

General information
- Location: West 110th Street and Manhattan Avenue; New York, NY; Upper West Side and Morningside Heights, Manhattan
- Coordinates: 40°48′4.02″N 73°57′34.7″W
- System: Former Manhattan Railway elevated station
- Operator: Interborough Rapid Transit Company
- Line: Ninth Avenue Line
- Platforms: 2 side platforms
- Tracks: 3 (1 upper level; 2 lower level)

History
- Opened: June 3, 1903; 123 years ago
- Closed: June 11, 1940; 86 years ago

Former services
Preceding station	Interborough Rapid Transit	Following station
116th Street toward 155th Street	Sixth Avenue	104th Street toward South Ferry
116th Street toward 155th Street	Ninth Avenue Local	104th Street toward South Ferry
Location

The 110th Street station was a local station on the demolished IRT Ninth Avenue Line in Manhattan, New York City. It had two levels. The lower level was built first and had two tracks and two side platforms and served local trains. The upper level was built as part of the Dual Contracts and had one track that served express trains that bypassed this station. It opened on June 3, 1903, and closed on June 11, 1940. The next southbound stop was 104th Street. The next northbound stop was 116th Street. This station, being the highest in the entire system, was one of the few equipped with elevators. Its high elevation also led to its having a reputation as a popular location for suicide jumps. The common suicides, combined with the line's 90° turns from Ninth Avenue (now Columbus Avenue) onto Eighth avenue (now Frederick Douglass Boulevard), subsequently earned the station, and the area of track around it, the nickname "Suicide Curve".

According to Douglas (2004), the station was a popular site for suicide jumpers. In 1927, The New York Times reported that:

The number of suicides from the 110th Street Station of the Sixth Avenue elevated is ruining the business of the merchants with shops below, according to [the merchants].... According to [a spokesperson] there were eleven suicides from that station in the past year, and the effect has been such that potential customers prefer to walk a little farther rather than risk seeing a person hurtle from above.
