= 110th Street station =

110th Street station may refer to:

- 110th Street station (IRT Ninth Avenue Line), a station on the demolished IRT Ninth Avenue Line
- 110th Street station (IRT Lexington Avenue Line), a local station in East Harlem
- 110th Street station (New York Central Railroad) (1876–1906) at Park St, East Harlem

== See also ==
- Cathedral Parkway–110th Street station (disambiguation)
- 110th Street–Malcolm X Plaza station, a station in Harlem
