= 99th Street station (IRT Ninth Avenue Line) =

Former Manhattan Railway elevated station (closed 1940)

99th St.

General information
- Location: Columbus Avenue between West 97th Street and West 100th Street; New York, NY; Upper West Side, Manhattan
- Coordinates: 40°47′41.36″N 73°57′57.64″W
- System: Former Manhattan Railway elevated station
- Operator: Interborough Rapid Transit Company
- Line: Ninth Avenue Line
- Platforms: 2 side platforms
- Tracks: 3 (1 upper level; 2 lower level)

Construction
- Structure type: Elevated

History
- Opened: June 21, 1879; 147 years ago
- Closed: June 11, 1940; 86 years ago

Former services
Preceding station	Interborough Rapid Transit	Following station
104th Street toward 155th Street	Sixth Avenue	93rd Street toward South Ferry
104th Street toward 155th Street	Ninth Avenue Local	93rd Street toward South Ferry
Location

The 99th Street station was a local station on the demolished IRT Ninth Avenue Line in Manhattan, New York City. It had 2 levels. The lower level was built first and had two tracks and two side platforms and served local trains. The upper level was built as part of the Dual Contracts and had one track that served express trains that bypassed this station. It opened on June 21, 1879, and closed on June 11, 1940. The next southbound stop was 93rd Street. The next northbound stop was 104th Street.
