= 140th Street station (IRT Ninth Avenue Line) =

Former Manhattan Railway elevated station (closed 1940)

140th St.

General information
- Location: West 140th Street and Frederick Douglass Boulevard; New York, NY; Harlem, Manhattan
- Coordinates: 40°49′10.8″N 73°56′39.24″W
- System: Former Manhattan Railway elevated station
- Operator: Interborough Rapid Transit Company
- Line: Ninth Avenue Line
- Platforms: 2 side platforms
- Tracks: 3 (1 upper level; 2 lower level)

History
- Opened: September 17, 1879; 147 years ago
- Closed: June 11, 1940; 86 years ago

Former services
| Preceding station | Interborough Rapid Transit | Following station |
|---|---|---|
| 145th Street toward 155th Street | Sixth Avenue | 135th Street toward South Ferry |
| 145th Street toward 155th Street | Ninth Avenue Local | 135th Street toward South Ferry |
Location

The 140th Street station was a local station on the demolished IRT Ninth Avenue Line in Manhattan, New York City. It had two levels. The lower level was built first and had two tracks and two side platforms and served local trains. The upper level was built as part of the Dual Contracts and had one track that served express trains that bypassed this station.

== History ==
This station opened on September 17, 1879 and closed on June 11, 1940.
