= 140th Street station =

140th Street station may refer to:

- 140th Street station (MVTA), a bus rapid transit station in Minneapolis
- 140th Street (IRT Ninth Avenue Line), a demolished elevated railway station in New York City
