= 99th Street station =

99th Street station can refer to:

- 99th Street station (IRT Second Avenue Line), a defunct New York City Subway station
- 99th Street station (IRT Third Avenue Line), a defunct New York City Subway station
- 99th Street station (IRT Ninth Avenue Line), a defunct New York City Subway station
- 99th Street/Beverly Hills station, a Metra station in Chicago
