= 135th Street =

135th Street is a street in Manhattan.

135th Street may also refer to the following stations of the New York City Subway in Manhattan:

- 135th Street (IND Eighth Avenue Line); serving the A, B, and C trains
- 135th Street (IRT Lenox Avenue Line); serving the 2 and 3 trains
- 135th Street (IRT Ninth Avenue Line); demolished

• 135th Street is alternate title for Blue Monday (opera), by George Gershwin
