= IRT Ninth Avenue Line =

Former New York City rapid transit line

IRT Ninth Avenue Elevated
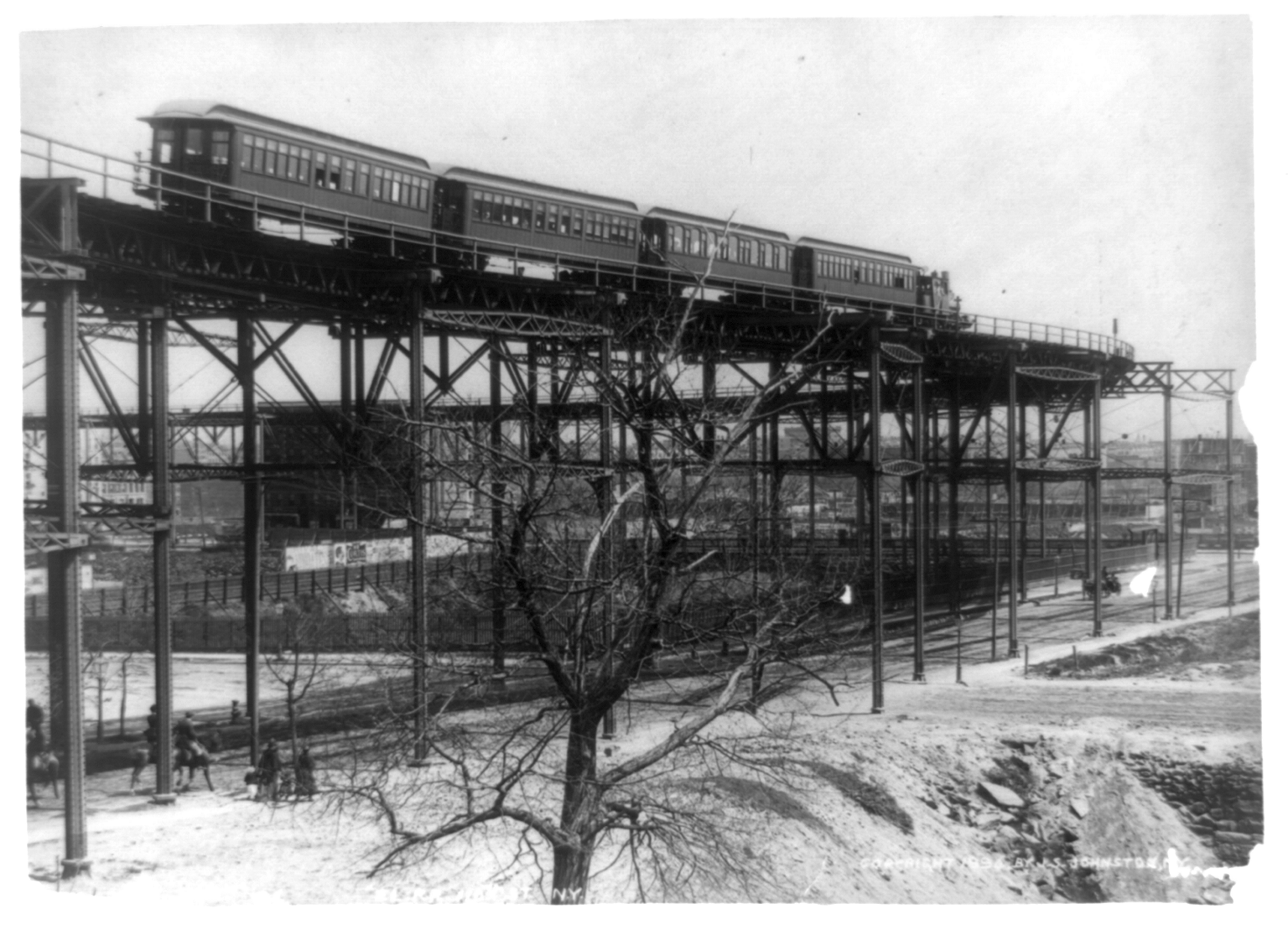
- The Ninth Avenue El's "suicide curve" at 110th Street, in 1896

Overview
- Other name(s): West Side and Yonkers Patent Railway; West Side and Yonkers Patent Elevated Railway Company; Westside Patented Elevated Railway Company; Ninth Avenue El

History
- Work began: July 1, 1867
- Opened: July 1, 1868
- Completed: April 1868
- Cable railway: 1868
- Regular Service: February 14, 1870
- Electrification: 1903
- Closed: June 11, 1940 (South of 155th Street) August 31, 1958 (North of 155th Street)

Technical
- Num of tracks: 2–3
- Character: elevated railway
- Track gauge: 4 ft 8 1/2 in (1,435 mm) standard gauge
- Electrification: DC third rail

The IRT Ninth Avenue Line, often called the Ninth Avenue Elevated or Ninth Avenue El, was the first elevated railway in New York City. It opened in July 1868 as the West Side and Yonkers Patent Railway, as an experimental single-track cable-powered elevated railway from Battery Place, at the south end of Manhattan Island, northward up Greenwich Street to Cortlandt Street. By 1879 the line was extended to the Harlem River at 155th Street. It was electrified and taken over by the Interborough Rapid Transit Company in 1903.

The main line ceased operation in June 1940, after it was replaced by the IND Eighth Avenue Line which had opened in 1932. The last section in use, over the Harlem River, was known as the Polo Grounds Shuttle. It closed in August 1958. This portion used a now-removed swing bridge called the Putnam Bridge, and went through a still-extant tunnel with two partially underground stations.

The line had the worst accident in the history of New York City elevated railways, on September 11, 1905, when a train derailed and fell to the street. Of the 61 casualties, 13 were killed and 48 were injured.

== History ==
=== West Side and Yonkers Patent Railway ===
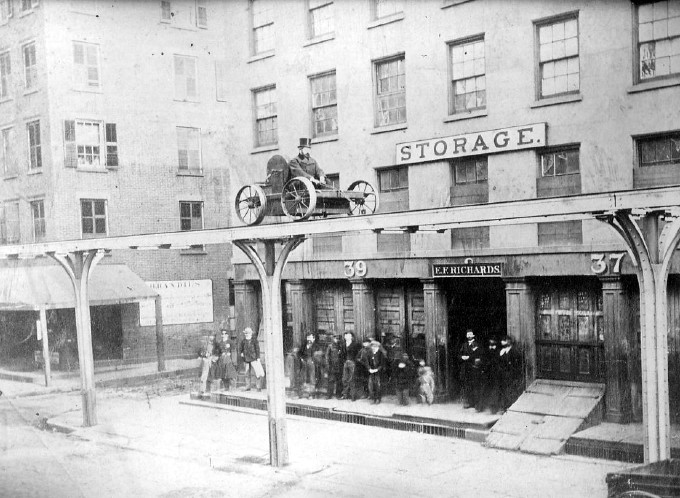
West Side and Yonkers Patent Railway test run, 1867

The predecessor of the Ninth Avenue Elevated was the West Side and Yonkers Patent Railway, which was built on Greenwich Street by Charles T. Harvey and ran in experimental operations beginning July 1, 1868, and for public use from June 15, 1870 through August of that year. The line used multiple one-mile-long (1.6 km-long) cable loops, driven by steam engines in cellars of buildings adjacent to the track. Each loop was started when a car neared it and stopped when it had passed. The cables were equipped with collars that the car connected to with "claws". As the claws could not be "slipped" the car was jerked each time it moved to the next cable. The system proved cumbersome, broke down several times and eventually the company ran out of money and the system was abandoned. The new owners replaced the cable cars with steam locomotives, and begun operations anew on April 20, 1871.

In 1885, the first demonstration of an electric traction engine in New York took place on the Ninth Avenue El.

=== Extension ===
The Ninth Avenue Elevated was extended up Greenwich Street and Ninth Avenue by 1891. The Ninth Avenue El and several other lines of the Manhattan Railway Company were taken over with a 99-year lease by the Interborough Rapid Transit Company on April 1, 1903. The Ninth Avenue Elevated extended over 100 feet (30 m) above the street at "Suicide Curve", where the line made two 90-degree turns above 110th Street to travel from Columbus Avenue to Eighth Avenue. On September 11, 1905, the worst accident in the history of New York's elevated railways took place at a curve at 53rd street, resulting in 13 deaths and 48 serious injuries. The rebuilding project was extended all the way north to 116th Street, creating Manhattan's first three-track elevated, although center-track express service did not begin until 1916.

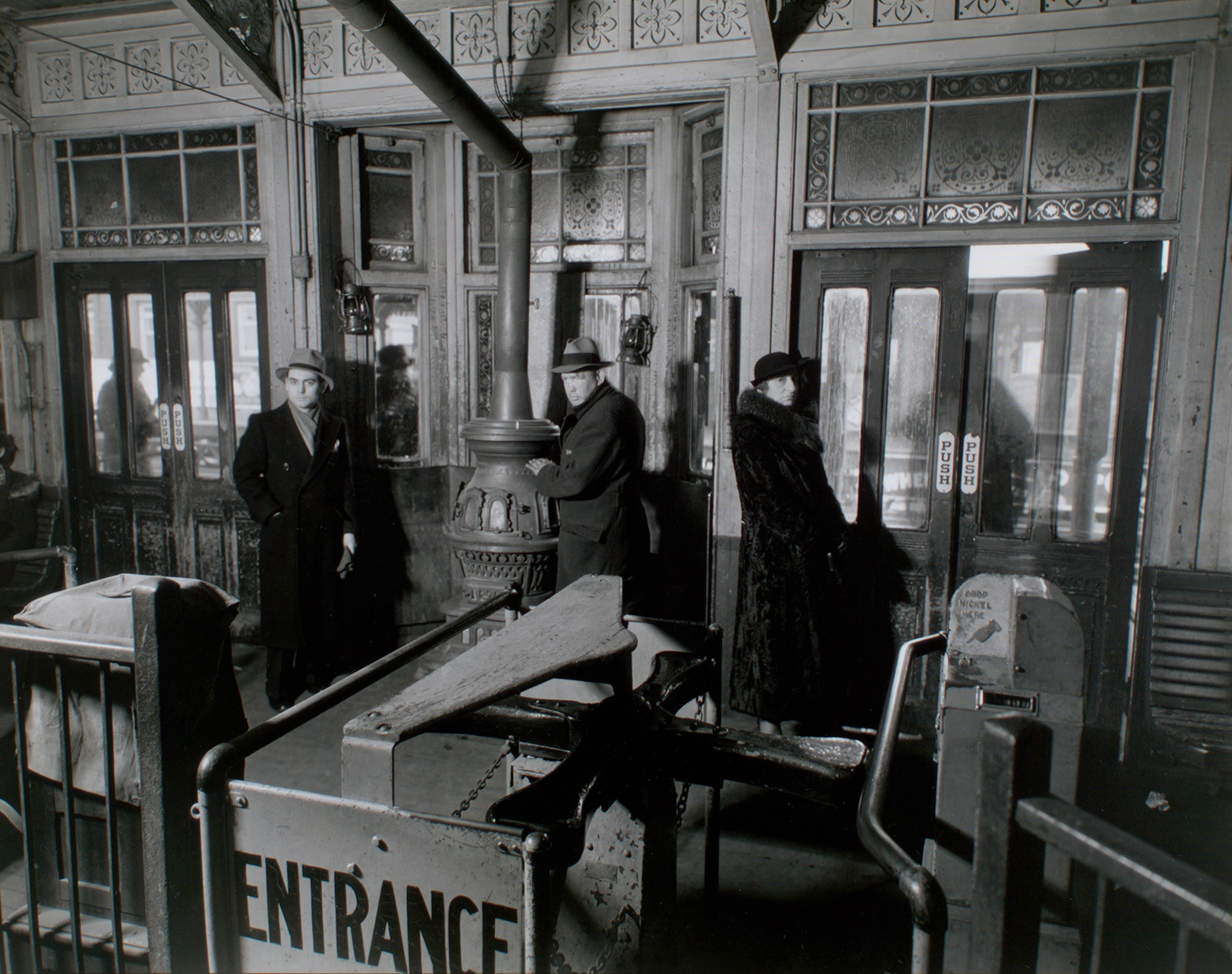
Berenice Abbott photograph of Ninth Avenue El station at 72nd Street in 1936

The line began at South Ferry and ran along Greenwich Street from Battery Place to Gansevoort Street in lower Manhattan, Ninth Avenue in midtown (joining with the Sixth Avenue El at 53rd Street, continuing along Columbus Avenue in upper Manhattan between 59th Street and 110th, turning east on 110th and running north on Eighth Avenue (Central Park West and Frederick Douglass Boulevard) until the Harlem River.

In January 1917, the installation of a third track was completed. The third track allowed the IRT to begin running express trains on the line in July 1918, from 125th Street to 155th Street; trains began using the new express station at 145th Street for the first time. At the same time, the line was extended to 162nd Street in the Bronx, and stations were opened at Sedgwick Avenue and Anderson–Jerome Avenues. In December 1921, Lexington Avenue–Jerome Avenue subway trains began running north of 167th Street at all times, replacing elevated trains, which ran to Woodlawn during rush hours, but terminated at 167th Street during non-rush hours.

As of 1934, the following services were being operated:

- 9th Avenue Local — South Ferry to 155th Street all hours, extended Sundays and late nights to Burnside Avenue via Jerome Avenue Line.
- 9th Avenue Express — Rector Street to Burnside Avenue via Jerome Avenue Line weekdays and Saturdays daytime, extended to Fordham Road weekday rush periods, also Saturday morning rush and afternoon thru PM peak. These trains ran express south of 155th Street southbound until noon and northbound after noon, and made all stops in the opposite direction.

=== Closing and Polo Grounds Shuttle ===
Most of the line was closed June 11, 1940, and dismantled, following the purchase of the IRT by the City of New York. A small portion of the line north of 155th Street remained in service as the "Polo Grounds Shuttle". Service ended in August 1958 as a result of the departure of the New York Giants baseball team, which had relocated to San Francisco, and the ending of passenger service on the New York Central's Putnam Division.

== Station listing ==
From north to south, the stations were:

Station	Tracks	Opening date	Closing date	Transfers and notes
Anderson–Jerome Avenues	Express	July 1, 1918	August 31, 1958	Still exists in ruins; continued north via the Jerome Avenue Line to 167th Street, and later to Woodlawn on January 2, 1919
Sedgwick Avenue	Express	July 1, 1918	August 31, 1958	Still exists in ruins; transfer point with NYC Putnam Division
155th Street	Express	December 1, 1879	August 31, 1958	Built next to NYC Putnam Division southern terminus, former transfer point until Putnam Division service to Manhattan ended in 1918
151st Street	Local	November 15, 1917	June 11, 1940	
145th Street	Express	December 1, 1879	June 11, 1940	
140th Street	Local	September 27, 1879	June 11, 1940	
135th Street	Local	September 27, 1879	June 11, 1940	
130th Street	Local	September 27, 1879	June 11, 1940	
125th Street	Express	September 17, 1879	June 11, 1940	
116th Street	Express	September 17, 1879	June 11, 1940	
110th Street	Local	June 3, 1903	June 11, 1940	
104th Street	Local	June 21, 1879	June 11, 1940	
99th Street	Local	June 21, 1879	June 11, 1940	
93rd Street	Local	June 21, 1879	June 11, 1940	
86th Street	Local	June 21, 1879	June 11, 1940	
81st Street	Local	June 9, 1879	June 11, 1940	
72nd Street	Local	June 9, 1879	June 11, 1940	
66th Street	Express	June 9, 1879	June 11, 1940	
59th Street	Local	January 18, 1876	June 11, 1940	Transfer to Sixth Avenue Elevated established on June 9, 1879
50th Street	Local	January 18, 1876	June 11, 1940	
42nd Street	Local	November 6, 1875	June 11, 1940	
34th Street	Express	July 30, 1873	June 11, 1940	
30th Street	Local	December 10, 1873	June 11, 1940	
29th Street		July 3, 1868	December 10, 1873	Original northern terminus
23rd Street	Local	After 1877	June 11, 1940	
21st Street	Local	October 21, 1873	Before 1879	
14th Street	Express	1875	June 11, 1940	
Little West 12th Street	Local	June 17, 1872	March 15, 1875	
11th Street		June 14, 1875	1879	
Christopher Street	Express	1880	June 11, 1940	
Houston Street	Local	November 3, 1873	June 11, 1940	
Watts Street	Local	May 6, 1872	1879	Sometimes referred to as the Canal Street station
Desbrosses Street	Express	1880	June 11, 1940	
Franklin Street	Local	January 21, 1873	June 11, 1940	
Warren Street	Express	1875	June 11, 1940	
Barclay Street	Local	1880	June 11, 1940	
Dey Street		July 3, 1868	1874	Original southern terminus
Cortlandt Street	Express	May 25, 1874	June 11, 1940	Sometimes referred to as the Liberty Street station
Rector Street	Local	1880	June 11, 1940	
Morris Street	Local	August 15, 1872; April 15, 1877	March 19, 1873; September 27, 1879	
7 Broadway		January 4, 1873	1877	Yard terminus, converted to a siding on closing
Battery Place	Express	June 5, 1883	June 11, 1940	Sixth Avenue Line
South Ferry	Express	April 5, 1877	June 11, 1940 (9th Avenue); December 22, 1950 (other services)	Second, Third and Sixth Avenue Lines; various ferries
