= 66th Street (disambiguation) =

66th Street may refer to:

- 66th Street (Manhattan)
- 66th Street – Lincoln Center (IRT Broadway – Seventh Avenue Line)
- 66th Street (IRT Ninth Avenue Line)
- 66th Street/Richfield (Metro Transit station)
