= Woodlawn station (IRT Jerome Avenue Line) =

New York City Subway station in the Bronx

Woodlawn
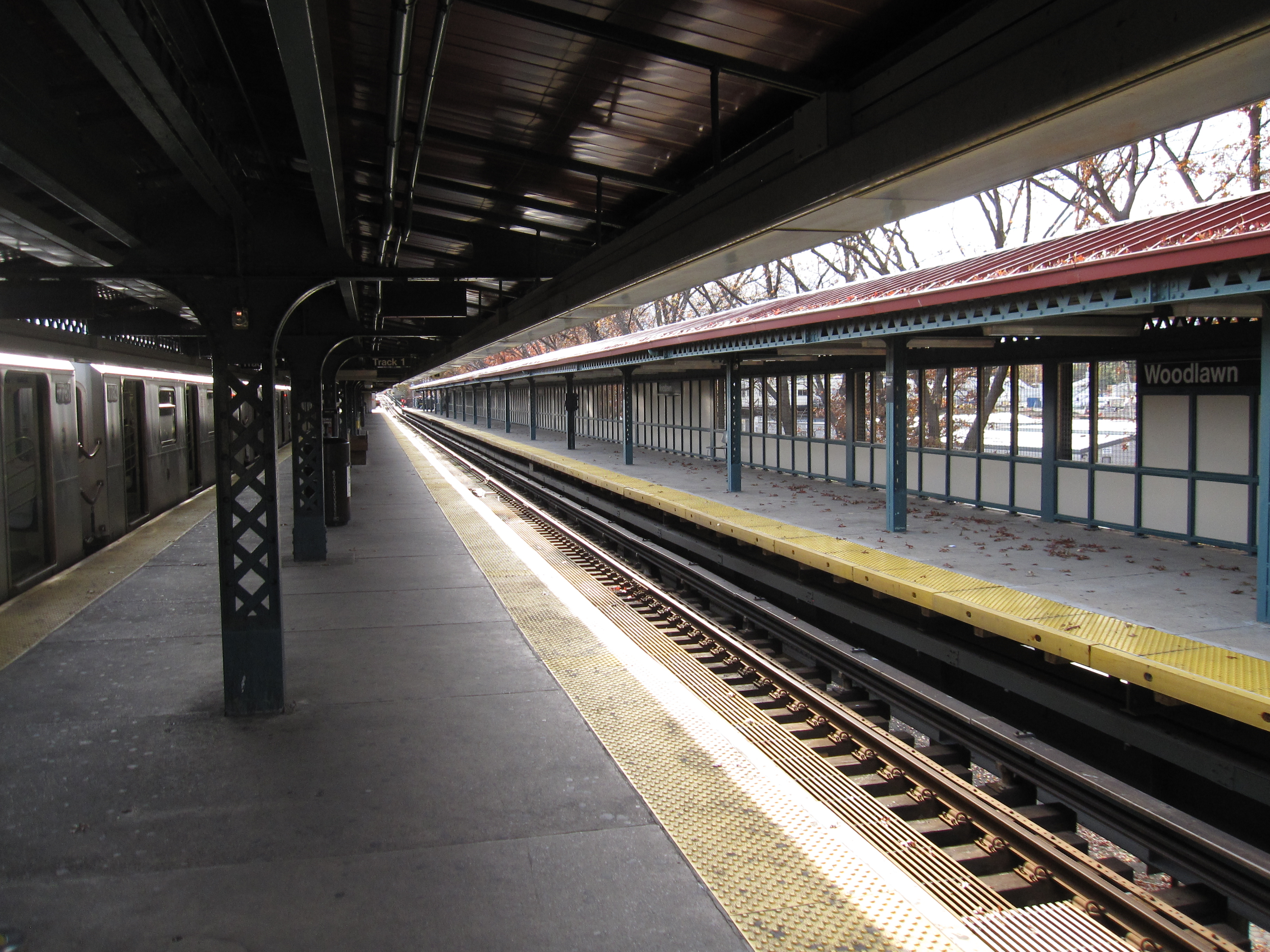
- The platforms at Woodlawn, looking south

Station statistics
- Address: Bainbridge Avenue & Jerome Avenue; Bronx, New York
- Borough: The Bronx
- Locale: Norwood
- Coordinates: 40.886005°N 73.878808°W
- Division: A (IRT)
- Line: IRT Jerome Avenue Line
- Services: 4 (all times)
- Transit: NYCT Bus: Bx16, Bx34; MTA Bus: BxM4; Bee-Line Bus: 4, 20, 21
- Structure: Elevated
- Platforms: 1 island platform (in service); 2 side platforms (unused); Spanish solution
- Tracks: 2

Other information
- Opened: April 15, 1918; 108 years ago
- Accessible: No; planned

Traffic
- 2025: 1,369,957 ▲5.2%
- Rank: 245 out of 423
Services
Preceding station	New York City Subway	Following station
Terminus	4 (New York City Subway service)	Mosholu Parkway toward Crown Heights–Utica Avenue
Non-revenue services and lines
Preceding station	New York City Subway	Following station
Terminus	no service	Burnside Avenue express
Location
Location within New York City Subway
Location within New York City
Location within New York
Track layout
Street map
Station service legend
Symbol	Description
Stops all times	Stops all times
- Woodlawn Station (Dual System IRT)
- U.S. National Register of Historic Places
- MPS: New York City Subway System MPS
- NRHP reference No.: 05000679
- Added to NRHP: July 6, 2005

Woodlawn station (sometimes called Woodlawn–Jerome Avenue station) is the northern terminal of the New York City Subway's IRT Jerome Avenue Line. The station is located at the intersection of Bainbridge and Jerome Avenues, outside Woodlawn Cemetery. Despite the station name, this intersection is in the Norwood neighborhood of the Bronx, and not in Woodlawn. It is served by the 4 train at all times. This station was constructed by the Interborough Rapid Transit Company as part of the Dual Contracts and opened in 1918.

Its opening helped spur the development of the area that had begun with the opening of nearby Woodlawn Cemetery. Following renovations in 2005, it was listed on the National Register of Historic Places for its use of ornamental concrete. A public art display of stained glass called Children at Play was also installed.

== History ==
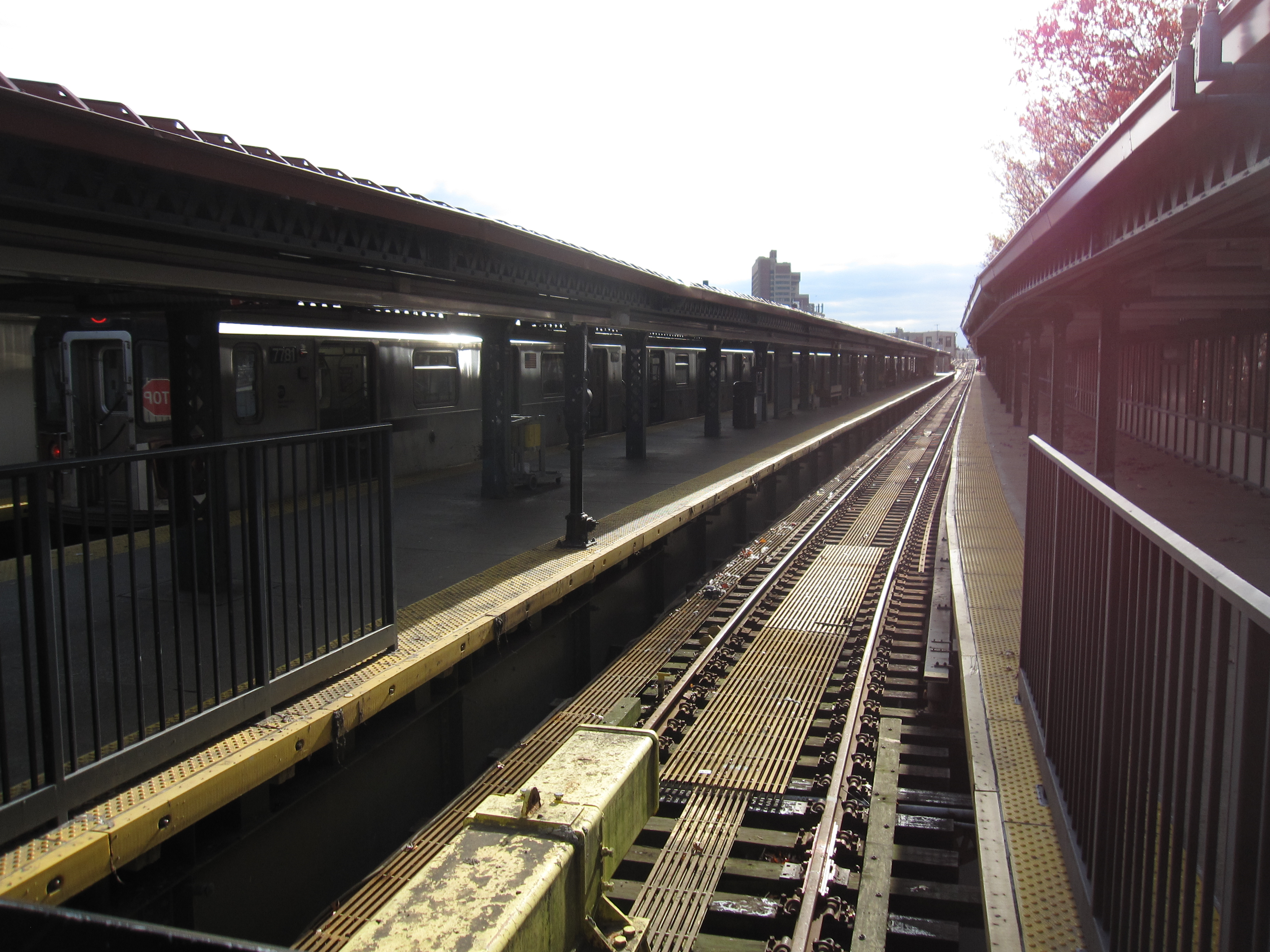
View of platforms from bumper block

=== Background ===
In the 1840s, the Harlem Railroad made the first rail connection between Manhattan and what became the Woodlawn neighborhood, a connection that still exists via the Woodlawn station on what is now Metro-North Railroad's Harlem Line. At that time, like much of the western Bronx, it was still rural and heavily farmed. Residential development did not start until after the opening of Woodlawn Cemetery in 1863. As a rural cemetery, at the time of its opening, it was as much a park as a burial ground, a popular place to visit for strolls and picnics. By the 1890s the surrounding neighborhood was well-populated with working-class Irish and Italian immigrants. Those residents had regularly been lobbying for a subway connection, which was constructed the Interborough Rapid Transit Company (IRT) was expanded via the Dual Contracts.

=== Construction and opening ===
The Dual Contracts, which were signed on March 19, 1913, were contracts for the construction and/or rehabilitation and operation of rapid transit lines in the City of New York. The contracts were "dual" in that they were signed between the City and two separate private companies (the Interborough Rapid Transit Company and the Brooklyn Rapid Transit Company), all working together to make the construction of the Dual Contracts possible. The Dual Contracts promised the construction of several lines in the Bronx. As part of Contract 3, the IRT agreed to build an elevated line along Jerome Avenue in the Bronx.

The first part of the line opened on June 2, 1917 as a shuttle service between Kingsbridge Road and 149th Street, in advance of through service to the IRT Lexington Avenue Line, which began on July 17, 1918. Woodlawn station opened on April 15, 1918 as part of the final extension of the IRT Jerome Avenue Line from Kingsbridge Road. This section was initially served by shuttle service, with passengers transferring at 167th Street. The construction of the line encouraged development along Jerome Avenue, and made surrounding areas desirable places for commuters to live, leading to their growth.

The station was named after Woodlawn Road, the former name of Bainbridge Avenue, but is most often associated with Woodlawn Cemetery, whose main entrance is just up the street. Woodlawn Road was renamed years ago, but the old name persists to this day on some signs. Woodlawn, though, became even more densely populated after the station opened. The cemetery, which had lobbied for a stop nearby, benefited as well. It opened a sales office to deal with the demand for burial plots. The subway's connection to Harlem led to many Harlem Renaissance figures such as Duke Ellington and W. C. Handy being buried at Woodlawn. The city government took over the IRT's operations on June 12, 1940.

=== Later years ===
The 1991 death of John McNalley at the station triggered an investigation into whether it could have been prevented. McNalley, in his 50s, had been reported as having difficulties as the train passed the Burnside Avenue station, six stops south. The train continued north; transit police were notified of the situation at Fordham Road. By the time paramedics were able to reach McNalley he had died from cardiac arrest. Transit police officers claimed that their calls to the Metropolitan Transportation Authority command center urging the train to be stopped were ignored. Their union president called for police to be given the authority to order a train stopped in an emergency.

In the mid-2000s, the station was renovated, as were others on the line. The second story was added above the mezzanine. Inside, the newsstand was restored. The station was listed on the National Register of Historic Places after it was renovated.

Albright's work was installed in two stages. Albright, a Queens College graduate and city native who has been commissioned to do several public artworks in the city, is primarily a painter and muralist who focuses on everyday members of the community. Children at Play was her first work in glass, and she spent time at a Philadelphia glass fabricator to understand the process. She took much of her inspiration from watching her son and his friends play, and also visited the station's vicinity extensively.

In July 2025, the MTA announced that it would install elevators at 12 stations, including the Woodlawn station, as part of its 2025–2029 capital program. The elevators would make the station fully compliant with the Americans with Disabilities Act of 1990.

== Station layout ==
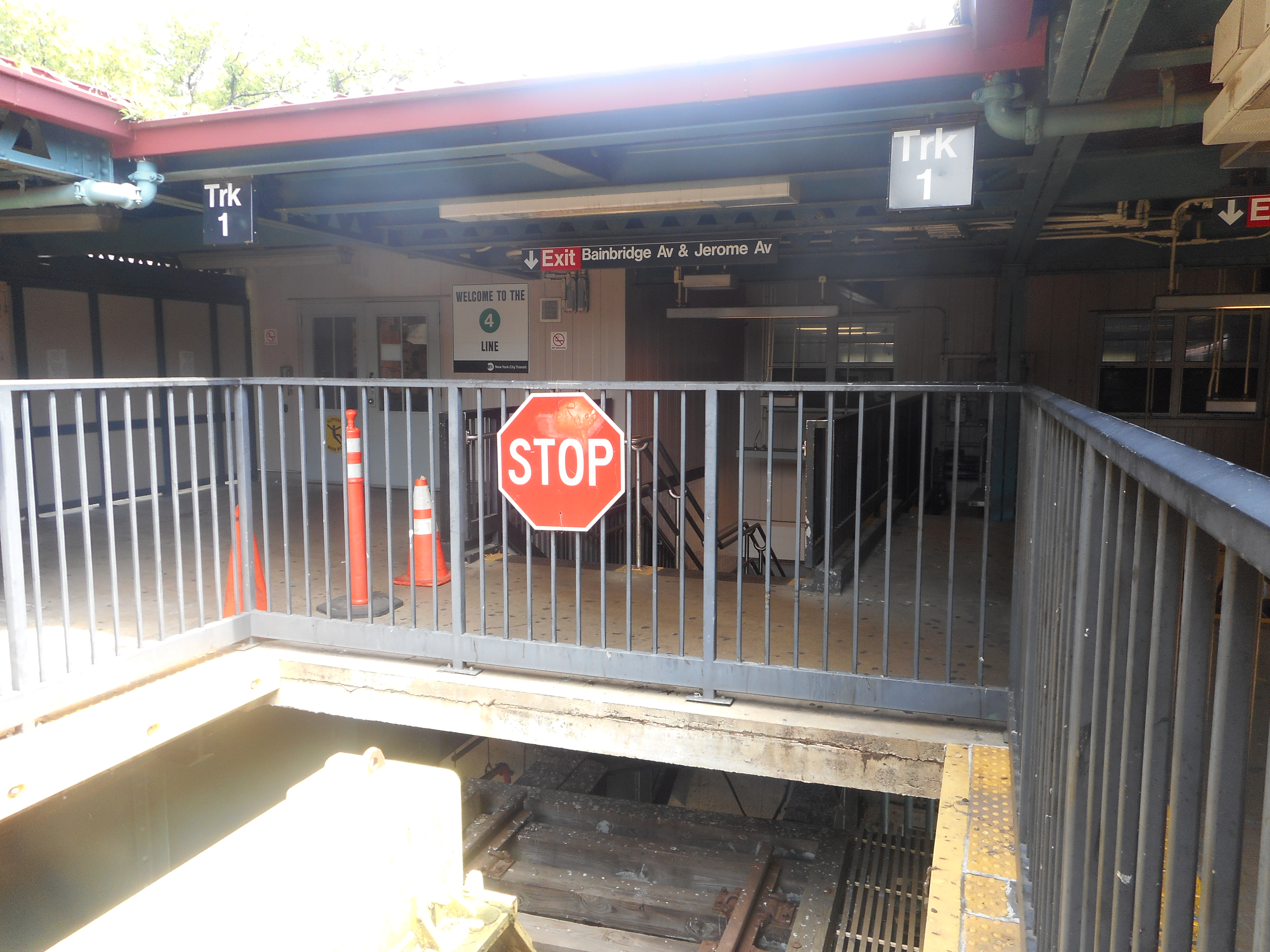
The bumper block at the end of Track 1

The station has two tracks, one center island platform and two disused side platforms extending south, ending a short distance north of 213th Street. The tracks end at bumper blocks at the north end of the platforms. The station was formerly set up as a Spanish solution with alighting passengers using the side platforms and boarding passengers using the island platform in a style similar to the other Bronx IRT terminals. Now all passengers use the island platform. The 4 stops here at all times.

The station is located above Jerome Avenue just south of its oblique intersection with Bainbridge Avenue at that street's northern end. Woodlawn Cemetery is on the east side of the street, and its main entrance and gatehouse are a block to the north of the station.

=== Exterior ===
Squire J. Vickers, the chief architect for the subway system, designed the station in 1917. The use of ornamental concrete was in keeping with his dictum that, in any location where an elevated subway line intersected a major boulevard or was close to a scenic asset such as a parkway, the structure should be sheathed in concrete. As a result, it serves as a visual focal point for the area and connects the commercial areas on either side of the street. Its interior is also decorated with the ceramic tilework that characterizes many of his stations above and below ground.

The Woodlawn station is built of steel frame faced in ornamental concrete, with a large headhouse at the northern end. Three large steel arches over Jerome Avenue support the mezzanine level. The tracks above them are supported by through girders with four half-inch (13 mm) expansion joints at their intersection with the supporting members in order to mitigate stress to the concrete caused by vibrations from passing trains. Burlap coated in coal tar atop the girders provides a waterproof track floor.

The concrete surface of the platforms is smooth, in contrast to the rough bush-hammered finish preferred elsewhere on the IRT Dual System stations. Corrugated metal windscreens are located along the length of the side platforms, which have also been enclosed in plywood. The west side has been partially enclosed to serve as station rooms. They are covered in steel frame canopies with truss supports and wooden-slat gabled roofs and lit by fluorescent fixtures.

At the south end the platforms are open and lit by modern double lampposts. Just south of the island platform's end is a pyramid-roofed original signal tower. There are other signal towers and service rooms, faced in corrugated metal, south of the other platforms. A flagman's structure is beneath the north end of the island platform canopy.

=== Interior ===
The entrances are at the base of the stair towers. They are openings sheltered by a bracketed metal portico that echoes the station's roof-line. Pedestrian traffic on the sidewalks can continue through.

Stairs lead up to the mezzanine, its interior faced in cream-colored brick. Fifteen stained glass panels in the five windows, depicting children playing against swirling, colorful backgrounds, comprise a work called Children at Play by Josie Gonzalez Albright. There is a newsstand and restrooms here.

Three separate flights of stairs lead up to the platform. Here, there is a dispatcher's office and crew quarters in the tops of the stair towers. There is a turnstile bank and MetroCard machines.

=== Exits ===
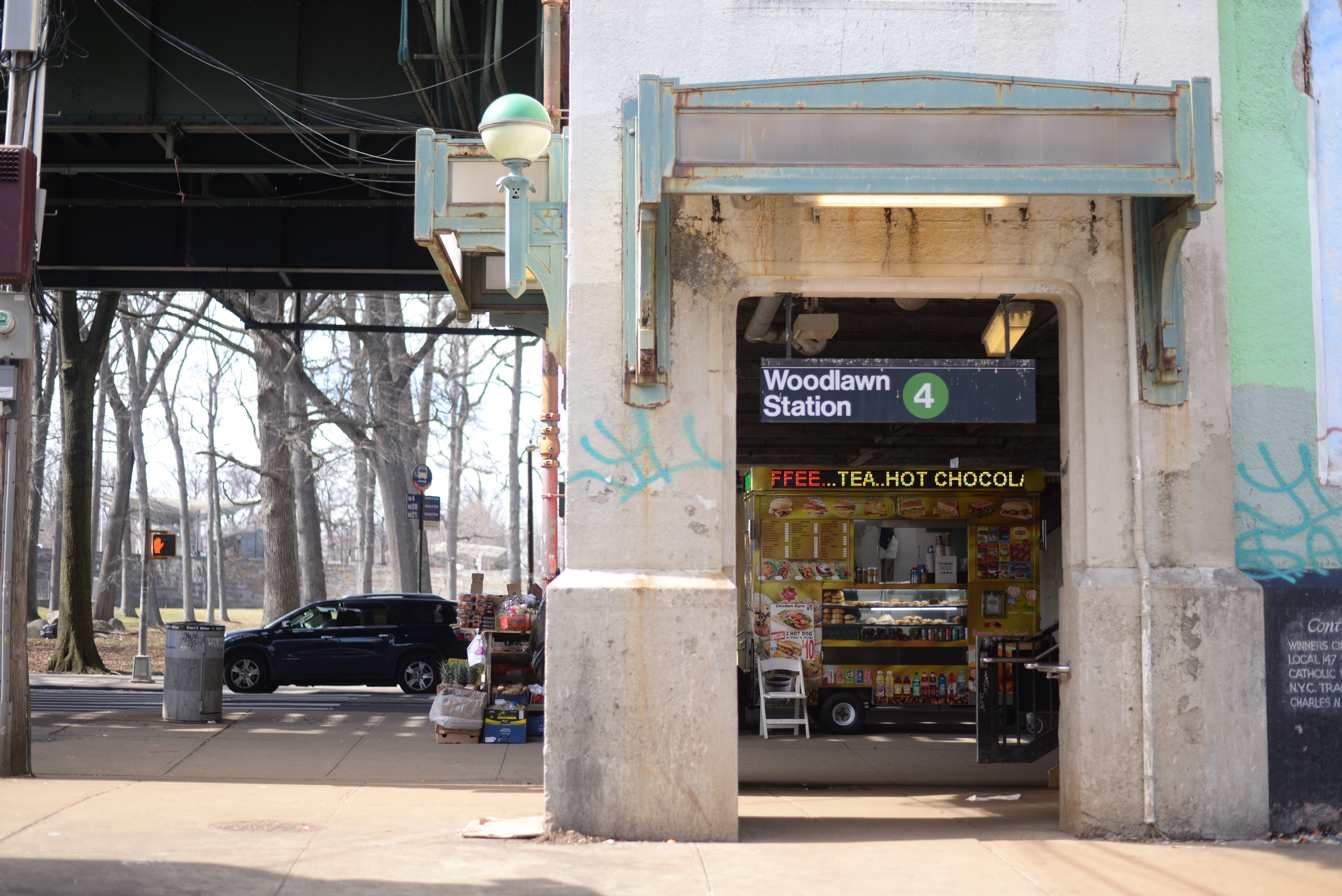
The northwest stair tower of Woodlawn Station.

The station's only exits are at the very north end of all of the platforms, where the head house is. Two cubical concrete stair towers with corner piers are at either end of the head house, going down to either side of Jerome Avenue at Bainbridge Avenue. The symmetrical windows on the west end are original nine-light casement windows; those on the east have been covered over or replaced. All are flanked with a narrow, wide-silled window similar to those on the north facade. Piers are at the corners. Murals with patriotic themes have been painted on the sides. At the top, below the gently pitched gabled roof in standing-seam metal, is a polychrome mosaic frieze above three recessed panels.

Between the towers is a two-story span. Its lower level, the mezzanine, is faced in concrete and divided into three sections divided by square pilasters. All have a recessed triple casement window; that in the central portion is flanked by two similar double windows. Traffic lights are mounted on the west side and western portion of the central section below window level. At the top of each pilaster is a mosaic tile. A smooth metal strip runs across the top. Above it is an apparent second story, sided in the vertical plywood that shelters the platform. It is recessed slightly from the mezzanine, with its fenestration echoing that below.

== See also ==
- List of New York City Subway terminals
- National Register of Historic Places listings in Bronx County, New York
