= 29th Street station (New York) =

Former rapid transit station

The 29th Street station was the original northern terminus of the West Side and Yonkers Patent Railway, the first elevated railway in New York City and the United States.

The West Side and Yonkers was a cable railway rather than a conventional railway; its cars were pulled by a drum on a single track.

== History ==
Having a railway to relieve congestion in New York City had been proposed at various times since 1825, but Charles T. Harvey received a patent for an elevated cable railway in 1867, and the line opened in 1868.

Although early plans called for the construction of its trackage over Broadway, local opposition led to its construction over Greenwich Street instead.

The cable railway proved a failure, and the Railway's assets were sold off at an auction on November 15, 1870. It was retooled to become a conventional railway powered by steam locomotives in April 1871, eventually becoming the Ninth Avenue Elevated.
