= Cathedral Parkway–110th Street =

Cathedral Parkway–110th Street may refer to:

- Cathedral Parkway–110th Street (IND Eighth Avenue Line)
- Cathedral Parkway–110th Street (IRT Broadway–Seventh Avenue Line)
