= Burnside Avenue station =

New York City Subway station in the Bronx

Burnside Avenue
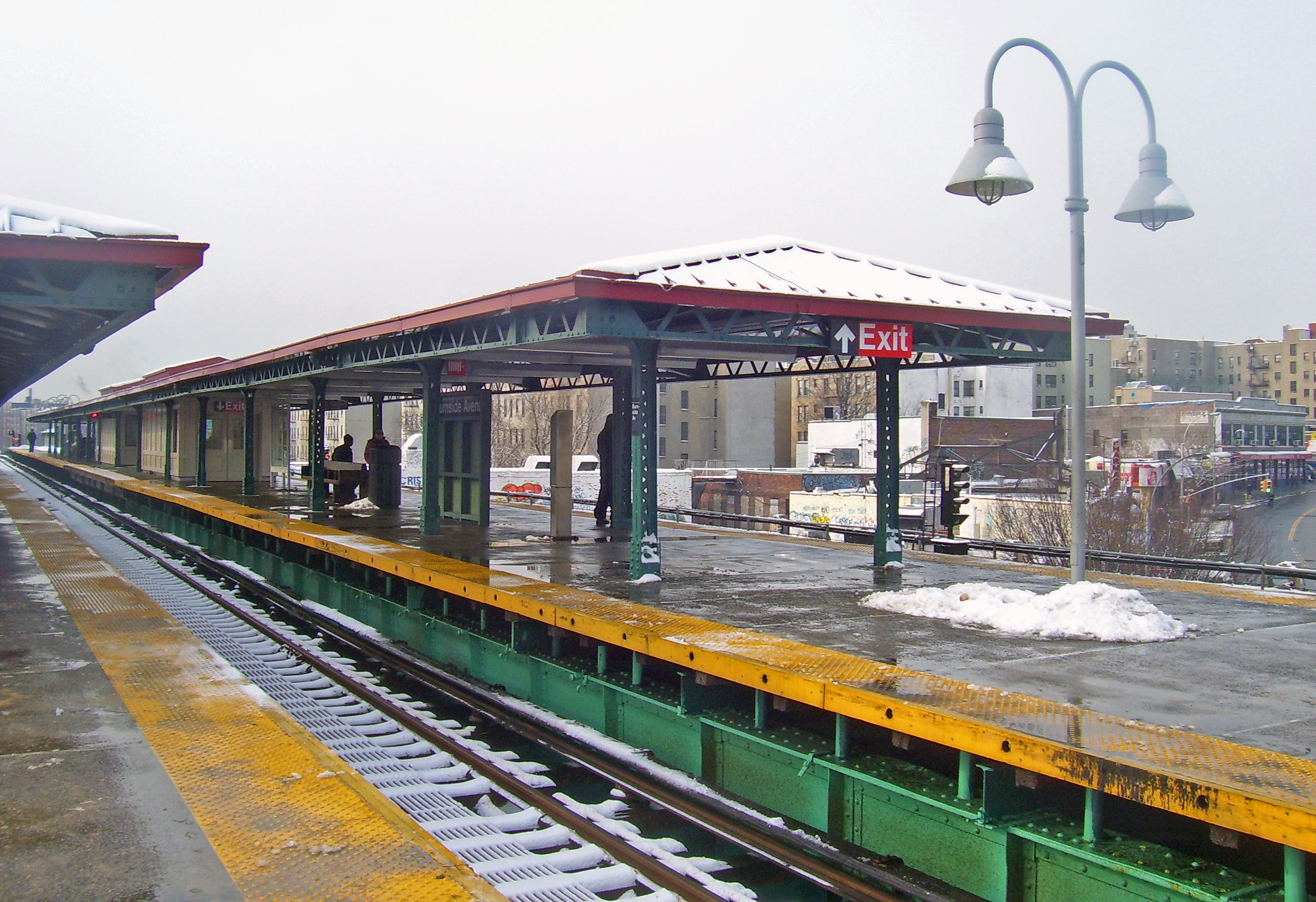
- View south from northbound platform

Station statistics
- Address: Burnside Avenue and Jerome Avenue; Bronx, New York
- Borough: The Bronx
- Locale: Morris Heights, University Heights, Mount Hope
- Coordinates: 40.853748°N 73.90739°W
- Division: A (IRT)
- Line: IRT Jerome Avenue Line
- Services: 4 (all times)
- Transit: NYCT Bus: Bx32, Bx40, Bx42
- Structure: Elevated
- Platforms: 2 island platforms cross-platform interchange
- Tracks: 3

Other information
- Opened: June 2, 1917 (109 years ago)
- Accessible: No; under construction
- Former/other names: Burnside Avenue–180th Street; Burnside Avenue–New York University

Traffic
- 2025: 1,954,902 ▼1.6%
- Rank: 182 out of 423
Services
Preceding station	New York City Subway	Following station
183rd Street toward Woodlawn	4 (New York City Subway service)	176th Street toward Crown Heights–Utica Avenue
Non-revenue services and lines
Preceding station	New York City Subway	Following station
Woodlawn express	no regular service	149th Street–Hostos express
Location
Location within New York City Subway
Location within New York City
Location within New York
Track layout
Street map
Station service legend
Symbol	Description
Stops all times	Stops all times

The Burnside Avenue station is an express station on the IRT Jerome Avenue Line of the New York City Subway. Located at the intersection of Burnside and Jerome Avenues in the Morris Heights, Mount Hope, and University Heights neighborhoods of the Bronx, it is served by the 4 train at all times. It also serves as a rush hour short turn northern terminal for select 4 trains from Crown Heights–Utica Avenue.

This station was constructed by the Interborough Rapid Transit Company as part of the Dual Contracts and opened in 1917.

== History ==
=== Construction and opening ===
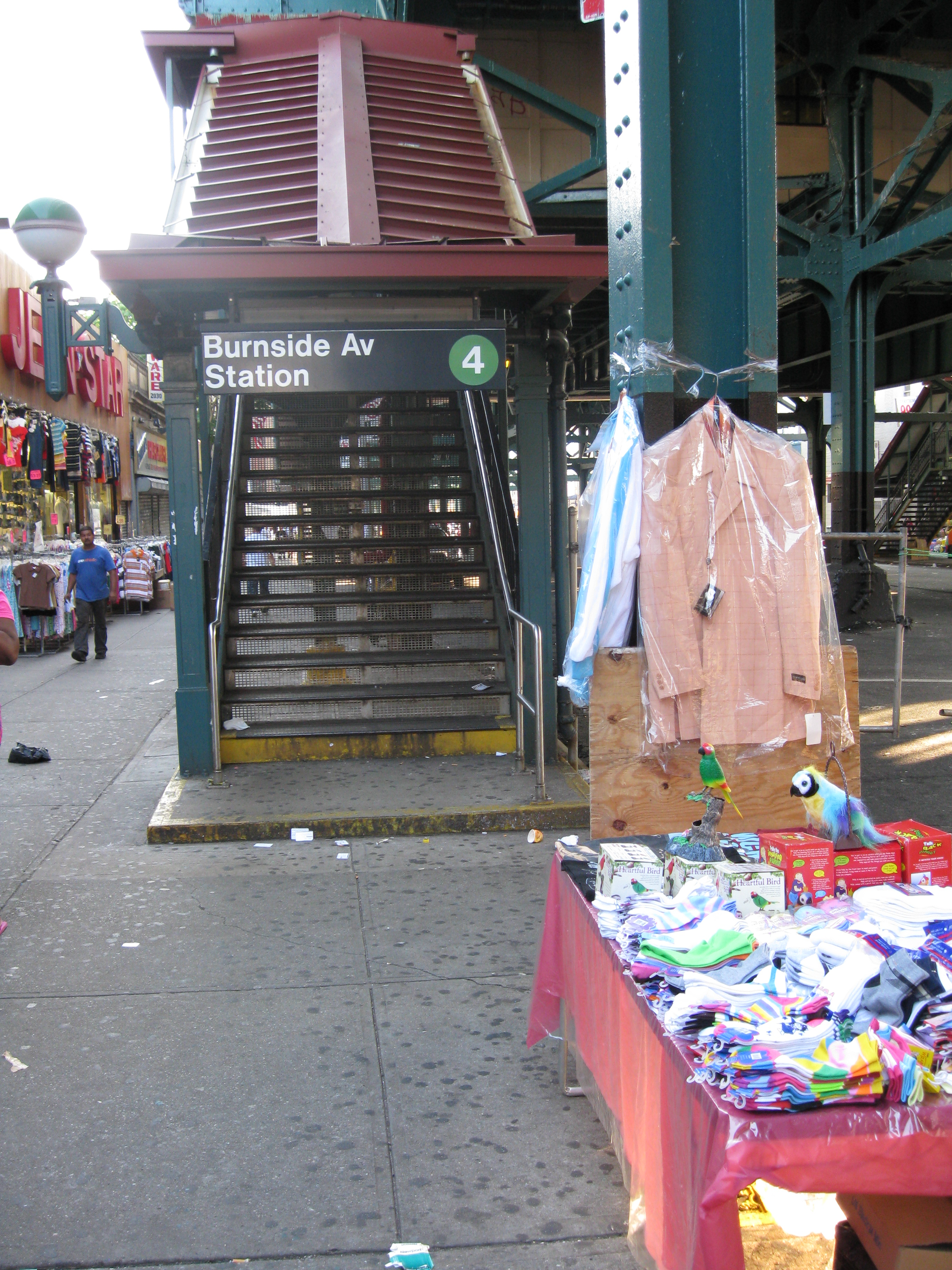
Street stair

The Dual Contracts, which were signed on March 19, 1913, were contracts for the construction and/or rehabilitation and operation of rapid transit lines in the City of New York. The contracts were "dual" in that they were signed between the City and two separate private companies (the Interborough Rapid Transit Company and the Brooklyn Rapid Transit Company), all working together to make the construction of the Dual Contracts possible. The Dual Contracts promised the construction of several lines in the Bronx. As part of Contract 3, the IRT agreed to build an elevated line along Jerome Avenue in the Bronx.

Burnside Avenue opened as Burnside Avenue–New York University on June 2, 1917 as part of the initial section of the line to Kingsbridge Road. Service was initially operated as a shuttle between Kingsbridge Road and 149th Street. Through service to the IRT Lexington Avenue Line began on July 17, 1918. The line was completed with a final extension to Woodlawn on April 15, 1918. This section was initially served by shuttle service, with passengers transferring at 167th Street. The construction of the line encouraged development along Jerome Avenue, and led to the growth of the surrounding communities. The city government took over the IRT's operations on June 12, 1940.

=== Station renovations ===
In 1973, New York University sold its Bronx campus located northwest of the station to the City University of New York. A year after the acquisition, in 1974, the station was renamed Burnside Avenue–180th Street because 180th Street was used as another name for Burnside Avenue at the time. It was renamed Burnside Avenue in 1979.

In 1981, the Metropolitan Transportation Authority (MTA) listed the station as one of 69 stations in dire need of renovation. A renovation of the Burnside Avenue station was funded as part of the MTA's 1980–1984 capital plan. The MTA received a $106 million grant from the Urban Mass Transit Administration in October 1983; most of the grant funded the renovation of eleven stations, including Burnside Avenue. Among the things that were done to the station during that time included a painted orange platform edge in addition to the yellow platform edge that was originally on each platform. New, corrugated signposts were installed and spaced evenly on the platform; these bore the station name in white lettering against a black metal sign (the font used for the signs was Akzidenz-Grotesk; it was first used as the agency's font prior to renovation).

The fencing around the entrances to the platforms from the mezzanine were painted black while the rest of the platforms, including a few mushroom shaped incandescent lampposts that were installed during the renovation and the fences around each of the four entrances, were painted red; most of the lampposts bore the 180th Street name. The original hand rails, as well as the original iron maidens were also painted yellow. Two fences that were at the south end of each platform retained their paint color; the one on the Woodlawn bound platform was later replaced with a second communication room.

As early as 1996, the 180th Street name began to be retired on the uncovered parts of each platform by replacing the mushroom shaped incandescent lampposts with unpainted sodium vapor lampposts. By 1999, all of the lights in those areas were replaced with sodium vapor lampposts.

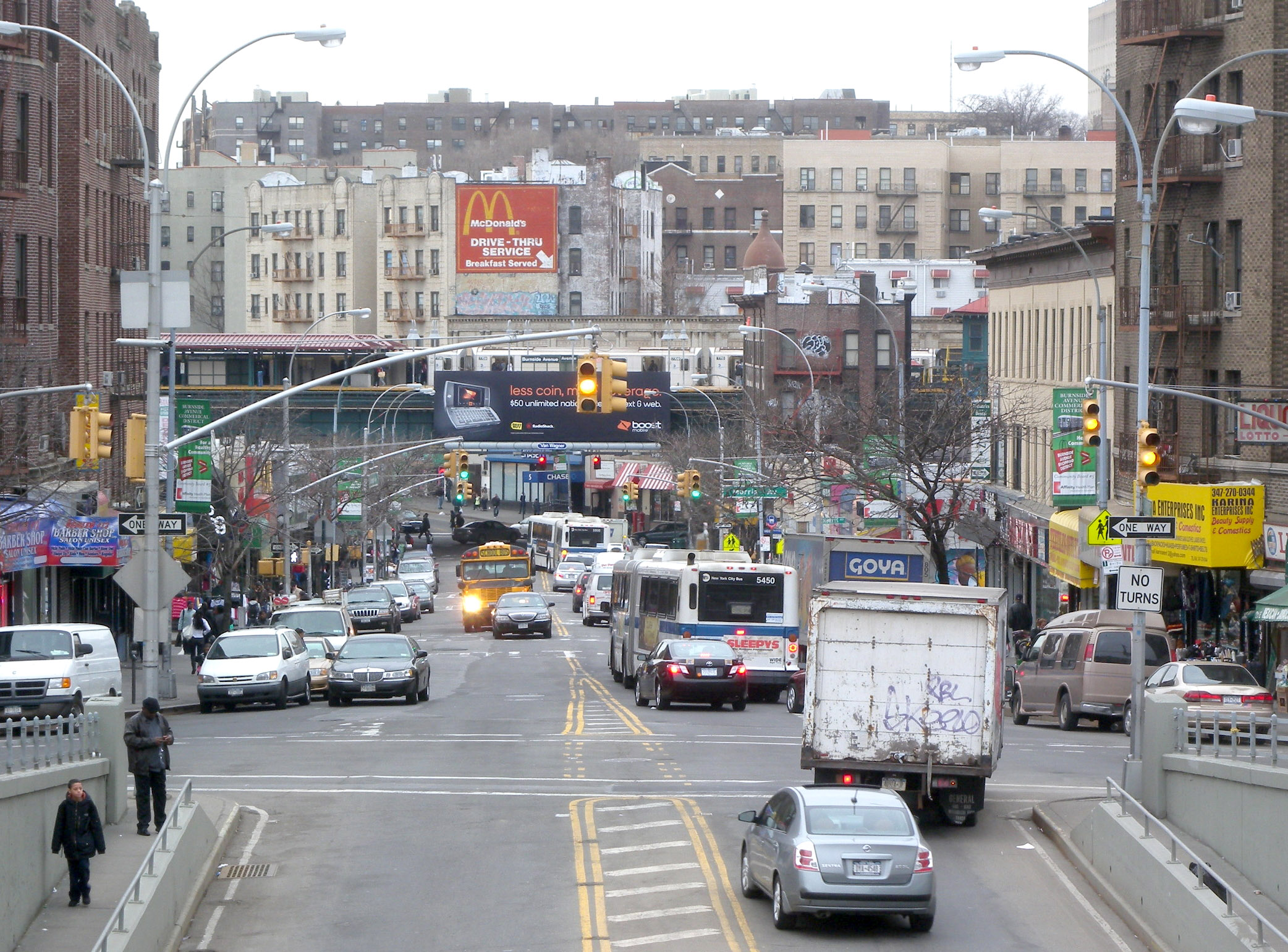
View of the station from East Burnside Avenue

This station was renovated a second time from June 17 to October 16, 2006 as part of a $55 million project to renovate five stations (183rd Street, Kingsbridge Road, Bedford Park Boulevard and Mosholu Parkway being the other four) on the IRT Jerome Avenue Line, bringing them to a state of good repair. During this time, the mezzanine area and staircases received a facelift, while both platform canopies and the structural beams that hold each canopy were replaced and yellow tactile edge warning strips were installed. Also, the token booth in the mezzanine was reduced in size and relocated from directly facing the main turnstiles from the unpaid side of fare control to facing the Manhattan-bound stairs from behind the Woodlawn-bound stairs, also from the unpaid side of fare control.

In May 2018, New York City Transit Authority President Andy Byford announced his plan subway and bus modernization plan, known as Fast Forward, which included making an additional 50 stations compliant with the Americans with Disabilities Act of 1990 during the 2020–2024 MTA Capital Program to allow most riders to have an accessible station every two or three stops. The draft 2020–2024 Capital Program released in September 2019 included 66 stations that would receive ADA improvements. In December, the MTA announced that an additional twenty stations, including Burnside Avenue, would be made ADA-accessible as part of the Capital Program. The MTA received $254 million from the Federal Transit Administration in 2023 for accessibility upgrades to four subway stations, including the Burnside Avenue station. Work on new elevators began in December 2024. To prepare the work for elevator installation at this stop, northbound 4 trains began skipping Burnside Avenue for 6 months until September 2026. Select northbound 4 trains that normally terminate at Burnside Avenue after running express from 161st Street during weekday rush hours would instead terminate at 149th Street-Grand Concourse, skipping 138th Street-Grand Concourse. Once the northbound platform is fully renovated, construction work will then shift to the southbound platform.

== Station layout ==
This elevated station has three tracks and two island platforms, and is the only express station on the elevated portion of the Jerome Avenue Line. The only other express station on the Jerome Avenue Line is the underground 149th Street–Hostos station. The 4 stops there at all times.

The 2008 artwork there is called How to Get to the Moon by Laura Battle, which speaks about the relationship between the sun and moon as well as day and night.

=== Exits ===
Four exits lead from the mezzanine to either southern corner of Burnside and Jerome Avenues, with two staircases to each corner. There are extra side exits from the wooden mezzanine near the stairs to the platform, and the station is three to four stories above street level.
