= 155th Street station (IRT Ninth Avenue Line) =

New York City Subway station in Manhattan (closed 1958)

155th St.

General information
- Location: West 155th Street and Frederick Douglass Boulevard; New York, New York; Harlem and Coogan's Bluff, Manhattan
- Coordinates: 40.8301°N 73.9382°W
- System: Former Manhattan Railway elevated station
- Operator: Interborough Rapid Transit Company; City of New York (after 1940) New York City & Northern Railroad (starting 1881); New York & Northern Railway; New York and Putnam Railroad; New York Central & Hudson River Railroad; New York Central Railroad (until 1918)
- Lines: Ninth Avenue Line; Putnam Division (until 1918)
- Platforms: 2 island platforms (1913–1940); 1 island platform (1940-1958)
- Tracks: 5 (1913–1940); 2 (1940–1958)

History
- Opened: December 1, 1879; 146 years ago
- Closed: August 31, 1958; 68 years ago

Former services
Preceding station	Interborough Rapid Transit	Following station
Sedgwick Avenue toward Burnside Avenue	Ninth Avenue Express	145th Street toward Rector Street
Terminus	Sixth Avenue	151st Street toward South Ferry
Terminus	Ninth Avenue Local	151st Street toward South Ferry
Preceding station	New York Central Railroad	Following station
High Bridge toward Brewster	Putnam Division (until 1918)	Terminus
Location

The 155th Street station was an elevated railway station in Manhattan, New York City, that operated from 1870 until 1958. It served as the north terminal of the IRT Ninth Avenue Line from its opening until 1918 and then as the southern terminal of a surviving stub portion from 1940 until its closure in 1958. It had two tracks and one island platform.

== History ==
When the Ninth Avenue El was extended to Harlem in 1879 it terminated at 155th Street as a matter of geographic necessity (the hills of Washington Heights and Highbridge would have made a northward expansion difficult) and demand (northern Manhattan and the Bronx were still sparsely populated). Development came to the area with the New York City and Northern Railroad (later known as the Putnam Division) building its terminal at 155th Street in 1881 and the Polo Grounds relocating to a site just west of the station in 1889. The line expanded into The Bronx on June 1, 1918, when the Putnam Bridge, which had been built in 1881 to carry the Putnam Division across the Harlem River, was leased by the IRT and connected to the 9th Avenue line, allowing it to join the IRT Jerome Avenue Line and add intermediate stops at Sedgwick Avenue and Anderson–Jerome Avenues.

With the building of the Eighth Avenue Line and Concourse Line by the city-owned Independent Subway System in the 1930s, the Ninth Avenue El was rendered redundant. On June 12, 1940, the el was closed entirely except for the portion from this station north to provide a connection from the Jerome Avenue Line to the Polo Grounds. The retained service, known as the Polo Grounds Shuttle, ran from 155th Street to the 167th Street on the IRT Jerome Avenue Line.

Though still moderately successful at its outset, the Polo Grounds Shuttle eventually suffered at the hands of the Concourse line and declining ridership of the New York Central's Putnam Division, the successor to New York and Northern. The need for the shuttle decreased when the Polo Grounds went vacant in 1957 after the baseball Giants moved to San Francisco and football Giants moved across the river to Yankee Stadium.

On May 29, 1958, the New York Central ceased operations on the Putnam Division, which rendered the shuttle unnecessary. Three months later, at 11:59 p.m. on Sunday, August 31, the shuttle was shut down and the elevated portion of the line demolished. The two underground stations were abandoned, but remain intact.
