= South Ferry station (IRT elevated) =

Former Manhattan Railway elevated station (closed 1950)

South Ferry
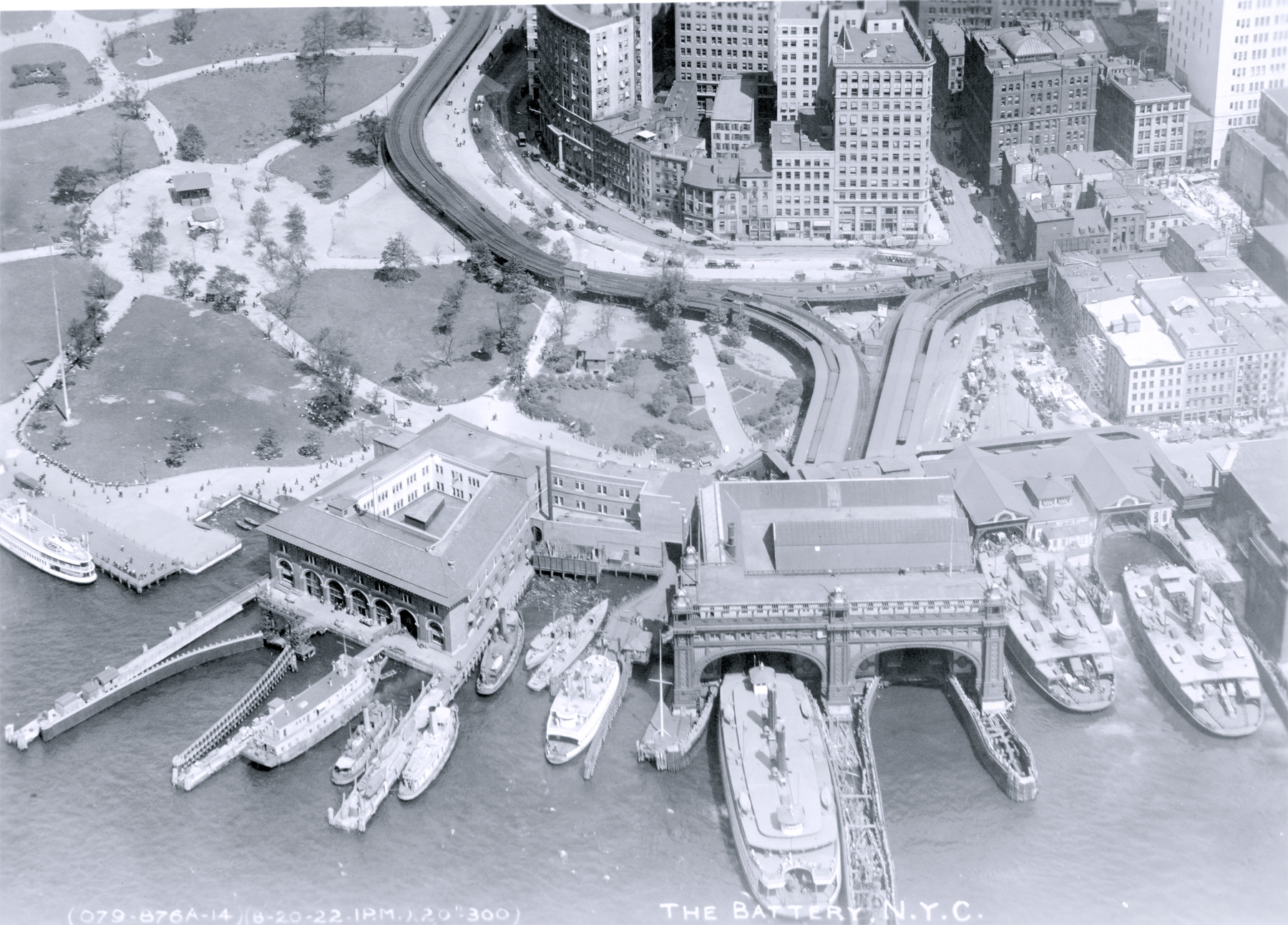
- The terminal in 1922

General information
- Location: South Ferry Bus Loop; Lower Manhattan, Manhattan, New York
- Coordinates: 40°42′05.6″N 74°00′49″W
- System: Former Manhattan Railway elevated station
- Operator: Interborough Rapid Transit Company; City of New York (after 1940)
- Lines: Third Avenue Line; Ninth Avenue Line
- Platforms: 2 island platforms, 2 side platforms
- Tracks: 4

Construction
- Structure type: Elevated

History
- Opened: April 5, 1877; 149 years ago
- Closed: December 22, 1950; 75 years ago

Former services
Preceding station	Interborough Rapid Transit	Following station
Hanover Square toward 129th Street	Second Avenue Local	Terminus
Hanover Square toward 129th Street	Third Avenue Local	Terminus
Battery Place toward 155th Street	Sixth Avenue	Terminus
Battery Place toward 155th Street	Ninth Avenue Local	Terminus
Location

The South Ferry station was an elevated station at the southern terminal of the IRT Second, Third, Sixth and Ninth Avenue Lines. It was located next to Battery Park at the lower tip of Manhattan, New York City. Two tracks came from the combined Second and Third Avenue Lines, and two from the Sixth and Ninth Avenue Lines, making four tracks at the terminal, with platforms on the outside and between each pair of tracks (no platform in the center).

The station was right above access to various ferries at South Ferry, at both the Battery Maritime Building and the Whitehall Terminal. The next stop on the Second and Third Avenue Lines was Hanover Square. The next stop on the Sixth and Ninth Avenue Lines was Battery Place.

The first elevated station at South Ferry was opened April 5, 1877 by the New York Elevated Railroad. It had one island platform between two tracks and was operated as an extension of the company's Ninth Avenue Line. The tracks were later continued straight into the company's Third Avenue Line, which opened August 26, 1878. The four-track station, opened March 1879, was built to provide an adequate terminal for both lines. It was located on a very short branch line, at right angles to the old station, facing toward the ferry terminals. Later the Second and Sixth Avenue Lines also used the terminal. A fire at the station in 1919 damaged the Whitehall Street Terminal.

Ridership on the Els began to decline as subway stations were replacing them. The Sixth Avenue Line was eliminated from the station in 1938, the Ninth Avenue Line in 1940, and the Second Avenue Line in 1942. When the Third Avenue Line was eliminated in 1950, the station was permanently closed. The station site is currently occupied by the South Ferry subway station.
