= Warren Street station (IRT Ninth Avenue Line) =

Former Manhattan Railway elevated station (closed 1940)

Warren St.

General information
- Location: Warren Street and Greenwich Street; New York, NY; Lower Manhattan, Manhattan
- Coordinates: 40°42′56.1″N 74°0′40.37″W
- System: Former Manhattan Railway elevated station
- Operator: Interborough Rapid Transit Company
- Line: Ninth Avenue Line
- Platforms: 2 side platforms 1 island platform
- Tracks: 3

Construction
- Structure type: Elevated

History
- Opened: February 14, 1870; 156 years ago
- Closed: June 11, 1940; 86 years ago

Former services
Preceding station	Interborough Rapid Transit	Following station
Desbrosses Street toward Burnside Avenue	Ninth Avenue Express	Cortlandt Street toward Rector Street
Franklin Street toward 155th Street	Ninth Avenue Local	Barclay Street toward South Ferry
Location

The Warren Street station was an express station on the demolished IRT Ninth Avenue Line in Manhattan, New York City. It had three tracks, one island platform and two side platforms. It was served by trains from the IRT Ninth Avenue Line. It opened on February 14, 1870 and closed on June 11, 1940. The next southbound local stop was Barclay Street. The next southbound express stop was Cortlandt Street. The next northbound local stop was Franklin Street. The next northbound express stop was Desbrosses Street.
