= Punnet =

Small box or square basket for fruits and vegetables

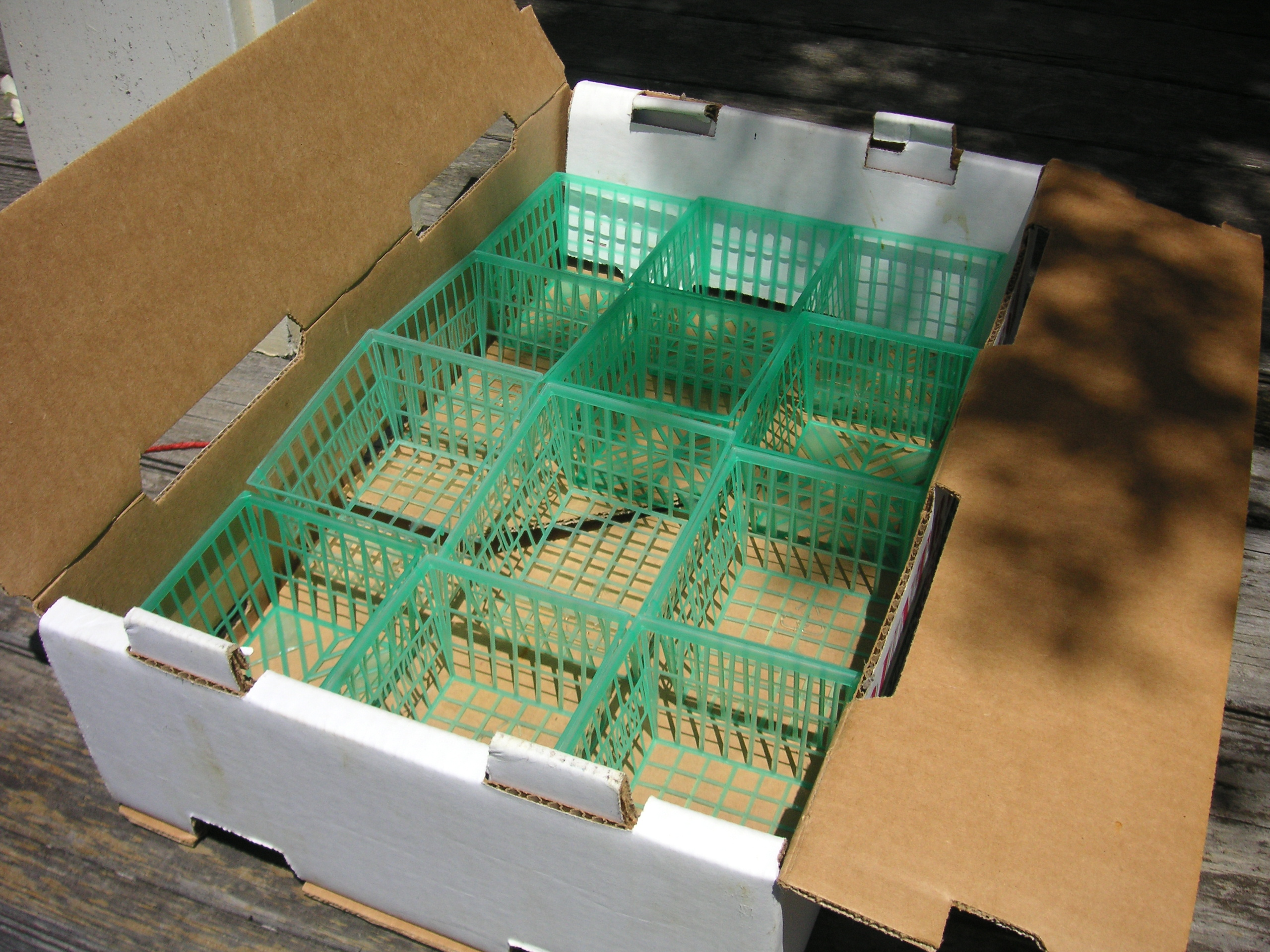
Empty punnets

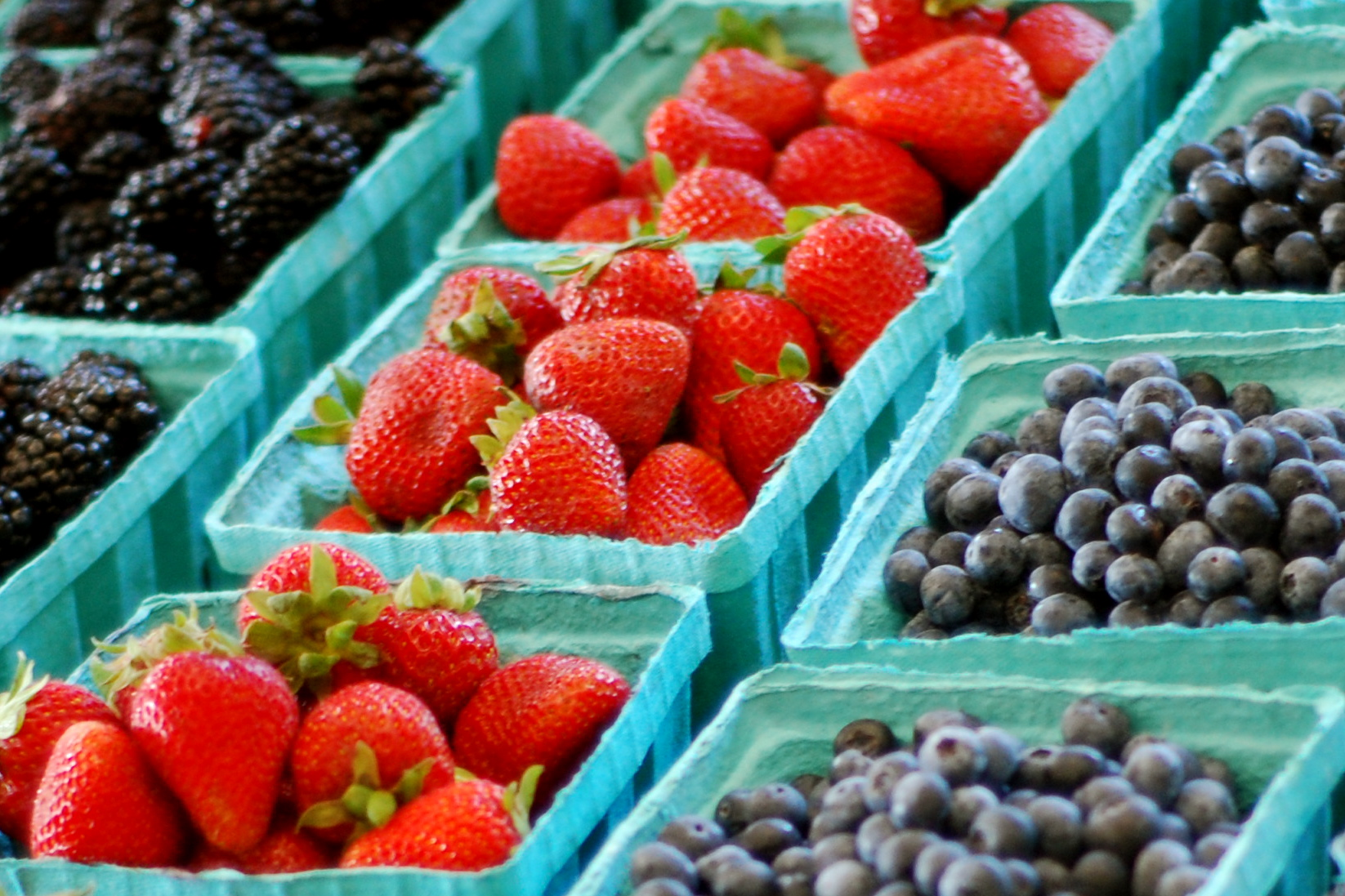
Moulded pulp punnets filled with blackberries, strawberries and blueberries

A punnet is a small box or square basket for the gathering, transport and sale of fruit and vegetables, typically for small berries susceptible to bruising, spoiling and squashing that are therefore best kept in small rigid containers. Punnets serve also as a rough measure for a quantity of irregular sized fruits.

== Etymology ==
The word is largely confined to Commonwealth countries and is of uncertain origin, but is thought to be a diminutive of pun, a British dialect word for pound, from the days in which such containers were used as a unit of measurement. The Oxford Dictionary of National Biography, parenthetically in its entry for geneticist R. C. Punnett (1875–1967), credits "a strawberry growing ancestor [who] devised the wooden basket known as a 'punnet.'"

== History and description ==
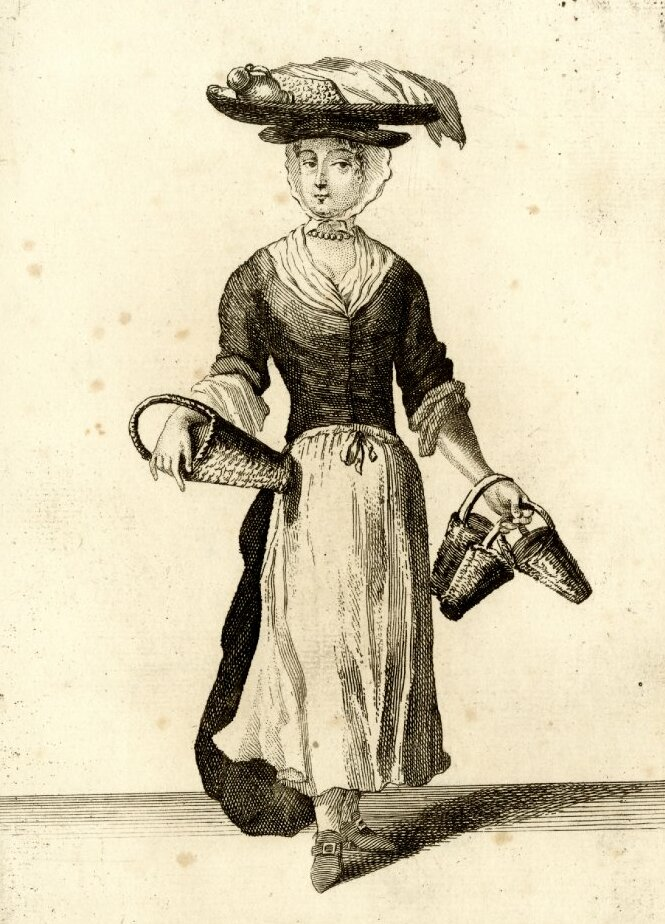
Strawberry seller carrying pottles, 1688, reworked and published after c.1750 Etching

=== Prior form ===
In the late eighteenth century, strawberries and some soft fruit were sold in pottles, conical woodchip baskets (see illustration), the tapering shape being thought to reduce damage to fruit at the bottom. The pottle used in England and Scotland at that time contained nominally one Scottish pint. They were stacked, fifty or sixty together, into square hampers for transport to the market, placed upon a woman's head on a small cushion and over longer distances in a light carriage of frame work hung on springs.

The Saturday Magazine in 1834 records 'pottle baskets' being made by women and children in their homes for six pence a dozen by steeping the cut wood in water, and splitting it into strips of dimensions needed for each part of the basket. The most skilful weavers formed the upright supports of the basket, fixing them in their place by weaving the bottom part. Children wove the sides with pliable strips of fir or willow.

=== Development ===
Pottles were replaced in the mid-1800s by the more practical rectangular punnet. The terms 'pottle' and 'punnet' were often used interchangeably. As reported in an 1879 issue of The Gentleman's Magazine, the conical pottle had given way to the punnet, being mainly manufactured in Brentford of deal, or the more preferred willow, by hundreds of women and children.

=== Purpose ===
A 1852 publication lists other produce being sold in punnets in British markets, including sea kale, mushrooms, small salad and tomatoes.

Punnets are used for collecting berries as well as for selling them, thus reducing handling of the fragile fruits and the likely damage that it could cause. The process is recorded in a 1948 poem by New Zealand author Mabel Christmas-Harvey;

Knees are aching, backs are breaking
Ladies fair who eat our spoils
Have you ever 'midst enjoyment
Realised our painful toils?

Forty, fifty in a punnet,
Each one picked by hand with care,
For a penny paid each punnet...
Thus you get your dainty fare.

=== North America ===
In North America, commercial strawberry horticulture began around 1820, and the fruits were packed in the same manner as that approved by English gardeners; in 1821 it was recommended that Massachusetts strawberry growers carry berries to the Boston markets in "pottles, that is, in inverted cones of basket work.” The English punnet used in the strawberry trade of New York City between 1815 and 1850 was a round shallow basket of woven wickerwork without handles. A handled punnet became more popular in the New York market, as related in the Proceedings of the New Jersey Horticultural Society by Charles W. Idell, who resided in Hoboken and managed a produce market at the foot of Barclay Street, New York:

The first strawberries marketed in New York were wild ones from Bergen County, N. J. The negroes there the first to pick this fruit for the New York market and invented those quaint oId fashioned splint baskets with handles. The baskets were strung on poles and thus peddled through the city.

=== Manufacture ===
A 1903 work describes the construction of punnets;

Strawberry punnets or baskets as used by fruiterers are made of thin strips of wood, well soaked before use. The bottom and uprights are comprised of six pieces of 1/16” wood; the bottom and side pieces may be of ash and the lacings, which are 1/32” thick and 1” wide, may be of pine.

By 1969, punnets in the United Kingdom were being made out of thinly lathed poplar wood peelers, using a semi-mechanical system. While factory workers still had to interlace the laths, metal staples were used to fix the strips.

=== Present-day forms ===
Contemporary punnets are generally made in a variety of dimensions of semi-rigid, transparent, lightweight PET plastic with lockable lids, or of clamshell design, and with vents. Their advantage is that they permit visual examination by the consumer but discourage physical contact with the merchandise at point of sale.

As early as 1911, cardboard punnets with wire handles were being used, and increasingly, moulded pulp and corrugated fiberboard are being used, as they are perceived to be more sustainable materials. Decorative punnets are often made of felt and seen in flower and craft arrangements.

In food packaging, punnets are primarily used to package fresh fruits and vegetables. The design of a punnet allows for easy handling, transportation, and display of produce, protecting delicate items from damage while keeping them visible to consumers. They are often used for small, delicate fruits like strawberries, raspberries, and blueberries, which require careful packaging to prevent bruising. Punnets are also used for other fresh produce such as mushrooms, cherry tomatoes, and salad leaves.

In addition to fresh produce, punnets are sometimes used for baked goods and small snacks. Their versatility makes them suitable for a wide range of food items that need to be kept fresh and protected from physical damage.
