= Cortlandt Street station (IRT Ninth Avenue Line) =

Former Manhattan Railway elevated station (closed 1940)

Cortlandt St.
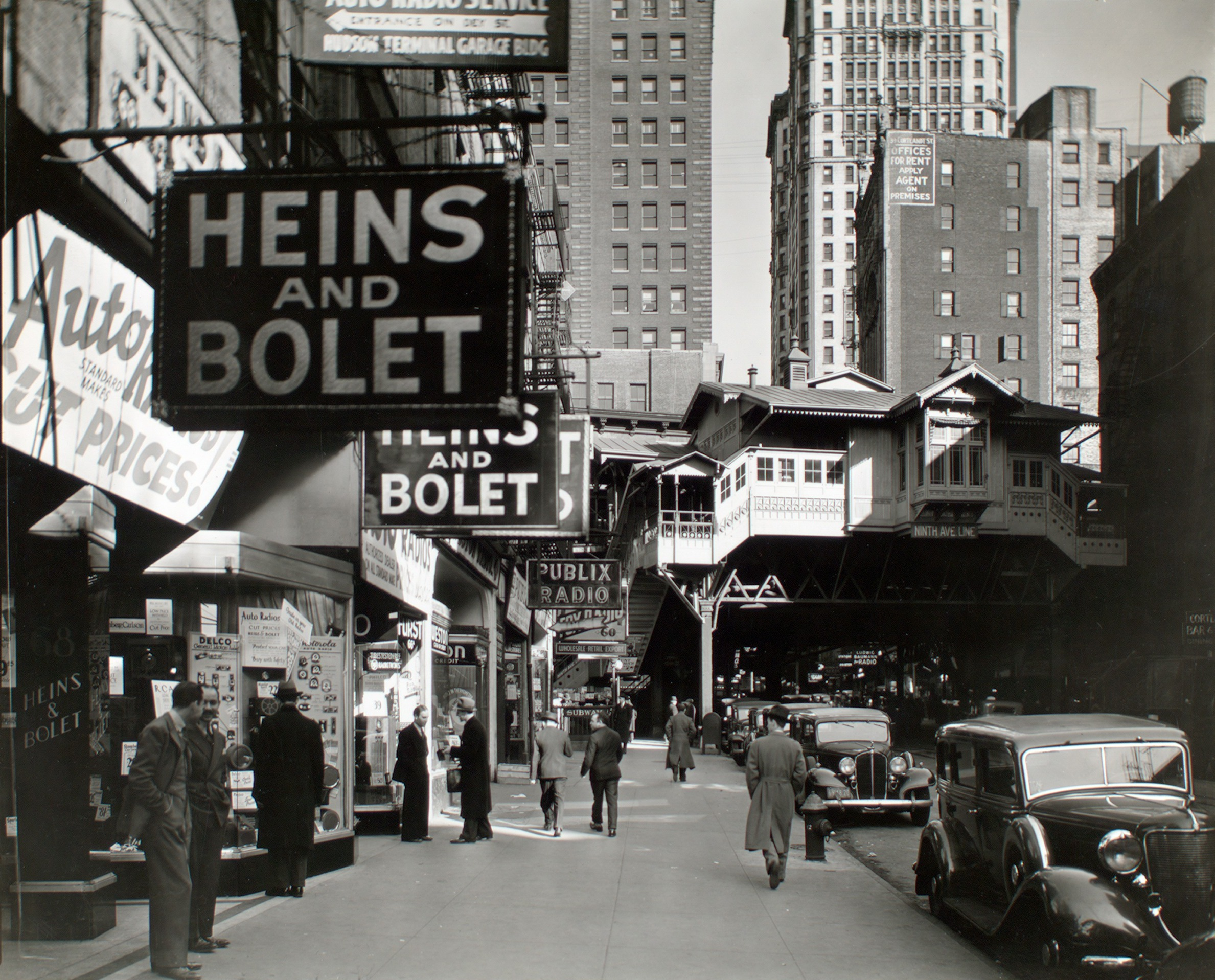
- Station viewed from Radio Row, looking east

General information
- Location: Greenwich Street between Liberty Street and Fulton Street; New York, NY; Lower Manhattan, Manhattan
- Coordinates: 40°42′39″N 74°0′44.65″W
- System: Former Manhattan Railway elevated station
- Operator: Interborough Rapid Transit Company
- Line: Ninth Avenue Line
- Platforms: 2 side platforms 1 island platform
- Tracks: 3

Construction
- Structure type: Elevated

History
- Opened: May 25, 1874; 152 years ago
- Closed: June 11, 1940; 86 years ago

Former services
Preceding station	Interborough Rapid Transit	Following station
Warren Street toward Burnside Avenue	Ninth Avenue Express	Rector Street Terminus
Barclay Street toward 155th Street	Ninth Avenue Local	Rector Street toward South Ferry
Location

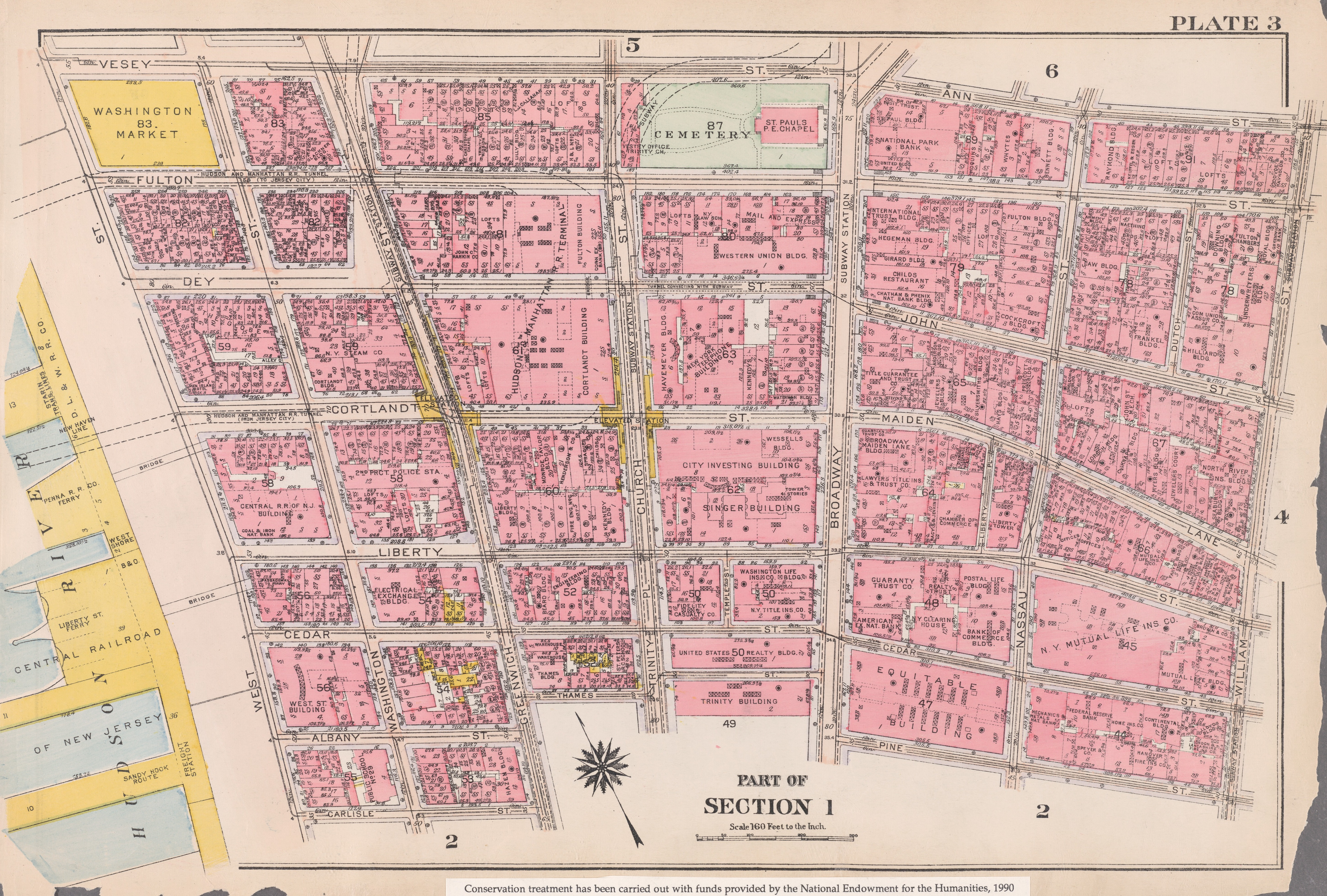
Cortlandt Street station on a map published in 1916

The Cortlandt Street station was an express station at Greenwich Street on the demolished IRT Ninth Avenue Line in Manhattan, New York City. It was built as a replacement for the original southern terminus at Dey Street. It had three tracks, one island platform and two side platforms. It was served by trains from the IRT Ninth Avenue Line. It closed on June 11, 1940. The next southbound stop for all trains was Rector Street. The next northbound local stop was Barclay Street. The next northbound express stop was Warren Street.

The station was located two blocks from Liberty Street Ferry Terminal and Cortland Street Ferry Depot. These were the main ferry terminals for passengers traveling to Communipaw Terminal and Exchange Place Terminal in Jersey City.

The site of the station was in the parcel of land acquired in the early 1960s as the location for the World Trade Center.
