= Desbrosses Street station =

Former Manhattan Railway elevated station (closed 1940)

Desbrosses St.

General information
- Location: Desbrosses Street and Greenwich Street; New York, NY; Lower Manhattan, Manhattan
- Coordinates: 40°43′24.3″N 74°0′34.49″W
- System: Former Manhattan Railway elevated station
- Operator: Interborough Rapid Transit Company
- Line: Ninth Avenue Line
- Platforms: 2 side platforms 1 island platform
- Tracks: 3

Construction
- Structure type: Elevated

History
- Opened: November 23, 1873; 152 years ago
- Closed: June 11, 1940; 86 years ago

Former services
Preceding station	Interborough Rapid Transit	Following station
Christopher Street toward Burnside Avenue	Ninth Avenue Express	Warren Street toward Rector Street
Houston Street toward 155th Street	Ninth Avenue Local	Franklin Street toward South Ferry
Location

The Desbrosses Street station was an express station on the demolished IRT Ninth Avenue Line in Manhattan, New York City. It had three tracks, one island platform and two side platforms. It was served by trains from the IRT Ninth Avenue Line. It opened on November 23, 1873 and closed on June 11, 1940. The next southbound stop was Franklin Street, while the next southbound express stop was Warren Street. The next northbound stop was Houston Street, while the next northbound express stop was Christopher Street. The station was located one block east of the Desbrosses Street Ferry's slip which provided connections to the railroad terminals in at Exchange Place and Pavonia.
