= Dey Street =

Street in Manhattan, New York

Coordinates: 40.7110°N 74.0107°W

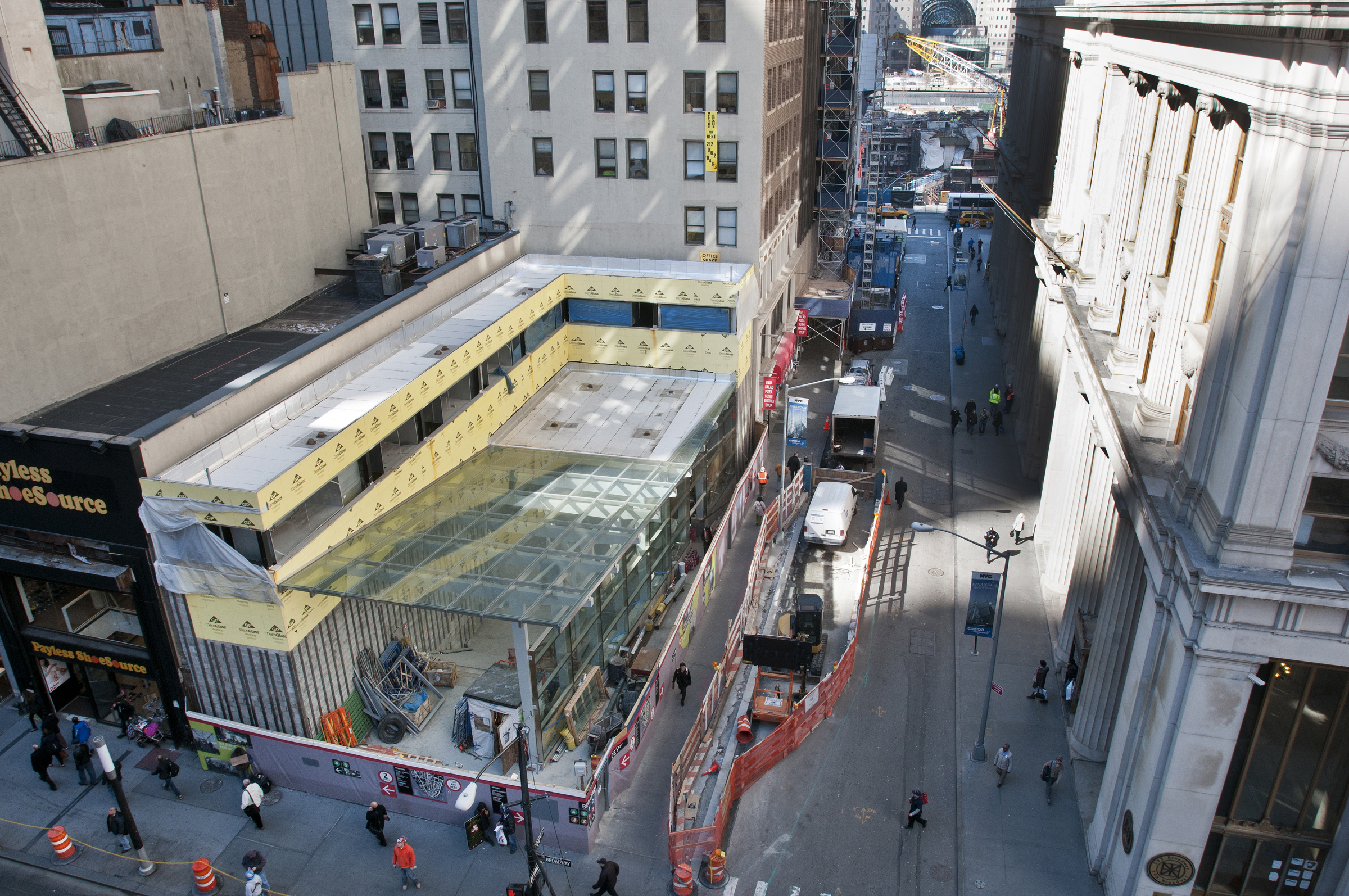
Modern day Dey Street

Dey Street is a short street in Lower Manhattan, in New York City. It passes the west side of the World Trade Center site and the World Trade Center Transportation Hub. It runs for one block between Church Street and Broadway. It originally ran to West Street, but the western reaches were demolished to make way for the World Trade Center in the late 1960s. It now extends to Greenwich Street. 15 Dey Street is the site of the first transcontinental telephone call.

== History ==
The Tyger was the ship used by the Dutch captain Adriaen Block during his 1613 voyage to explore the East Coast of North America and the present day Hudson River. In November, an accidental fire broke out; the Tyger rapidly burned to the waterline, and the charred hull was beached. In 1916, workmen discovered the prow and keel of Tyger while excavating an extension for the New York City Subway's BMT Broadway Line. The ship was uncovered at a depth of about 20 feet (6.1 m) below the street near the intersection of Greenwich and Dey Streets.

In 1625, the area was part of thirty-three acres set aside to grow food for the Dutch West India Company colony.

In 1641 Dirck Dey (aka Dirck Janszen Siecken) arrived in Nieuw Amsterdam, a soldier in the employ of the GWC. That December he married a woman also from Holland. In 1647, he was sentenced to be executed for insubordination and striking an officer, but was pardoned. Peter Stuyvesant later granted him a patent for land in Communipaw, which Dey then sold. By 1665 he was living outside "the land gate" of the Heeren Straat.

Sometime prior to 1671 Dey began to lease from successive colonial governors "The Dukes Farm" ("the King's Farm" after the accession of James II), and continued to do so as sub-lessee after it was leased to Trinity Church. The Church Farm just west of St. Paul's Chapel was also the site of the city's red-light district, known as "The Holy Ground".

Dey also owned about five and a half acres just south of the Church lands, stretching from Broadway to the Hudson river, where he established a mill and ferry. By 1674, he was counted among the more prosperous residents of the colony. He died in 1688, and the Broadway lot passed to his son Dirck Teunis Dey, who obtained the grant of a water lot and built a dock on the river in 1743. Dey Street was levelled and paved with stones in 1749. According to Pierre Eugene du Simitiere, an early alternate name was Batteau or Battoe Street. In 1750, Dirck Teunis purchased a small slip of adjoining land from Trinity Church to accommodate the required width for Partition Street, where he then built a wharf. In 1765, his surviving heirs conveyed the property to their sister Jane and her husband Johannes Varick, parents of future mayor Richard Varick.

At the time, Dey Street extended west all the way to the Hudson River. As the shoreline was built outward with landfill, the street gradually lengthened.

== Modern era ==
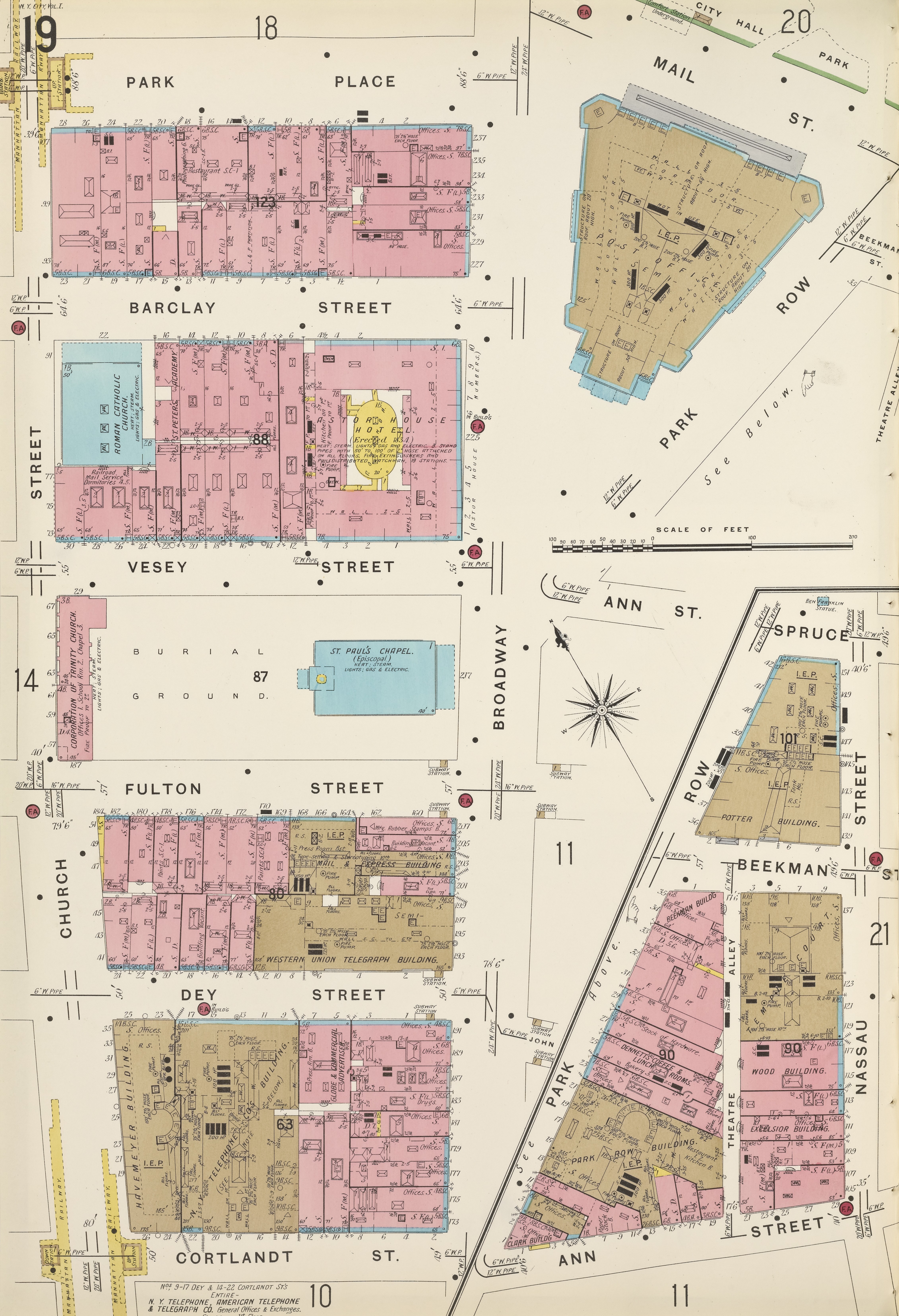
area map 1905

=== Western Union and AT&T ===
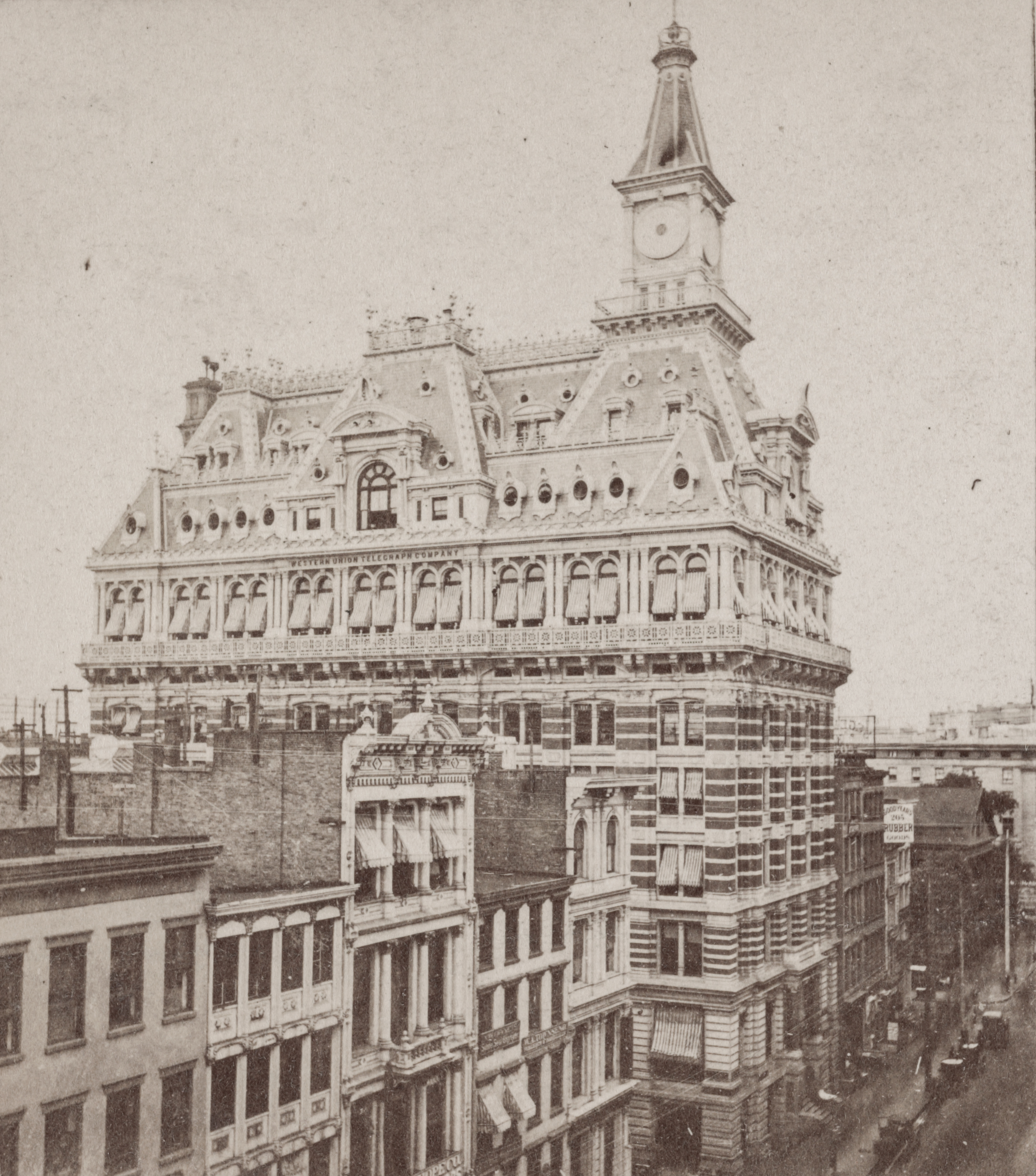
Western Union Telegraph Building

In 1872, a property at the northwest corner of Broadway and Dey Street was owned by the former French emperor, Napoleon III, through his trusted dentist, Thomas W. Evans. It was purchased by The Western Union Company for its new corporate headquarters, the Western Union Telegraph Building. Designed by George B. Post, the building was one of New York City's early skyscrapers. The clock tower made it one of the tallest structures in the city. Dey Street sloped downward away from Broadway, so that while the basement was half a level below Broadway, it was at the same level as Dey Street at the western end. Starting in 1877, a time ball was dropped from the top of the building at exactly noon, triggered by a telegraph from the National Observatory in Washington, D.C. It was used as an aid to navigation and railway operations. It inspired the New Year's Eve Times Square Ball drop that started in 1907.

The building at 15 Dey (195 Broadway) was acquired by the American Telephone and Telegraph Company and demolition began in stages in 1912. In 1914, the Associated Press, which had offices in the building, relocated to Chambers Street. The new AT&T building was completed in 1916, with a frontage of 275 feet on Dey Street. The Dey Street annex, along the south side of the premises, was an L-shaped structure at the corner of Dey Street and Broadway with an extension reaching Fulton Street, which featured a 29-story campanile. The campanile was topped by the "Spirit of Communication" statue, a 24-foot (7.3 m) sculpture later relocated to Dallas.

AT&T relocated its headquarters to 550 Madison Avenue in 1984. As of 2018, the 195 Broadway building is occupied by HarperCollins and others. In 2006, the building was designated a New York City Landmark.

=== Transit ===
An elevated railway system designed by Charles T. Harvey opened for business in July 1868. It operated under the name West-Side and Yonkers Patent Railway Company. In 1871 the company failed and was reorganized as the New York Elevated Railroad Company. The line ran on Greenwich Street; it had two stations: the original northern terminus was 29th Street and the southern terminus was Dey Street. Initially, a ledge attached to the second floor of an existing building with a platform cantilevered out over the sidewalk served as a station. The line was gradually extended along Ninth Avenue by 1869. In 1874, the station at Dey Street was closed and demolished with the opening of a replacement station at Cortlandt Street.

Hudson Terminal was a rapid transit station and office-tower complex in the Radio Row neighborhood of Lower Manhattan. It opened during 1908 as a terminal station for the Hudson & Manhattan Railroad (H&M). The property occupied the length of two city blocks along the west side of Church Street from Cortlandt Street to Fulton Street.

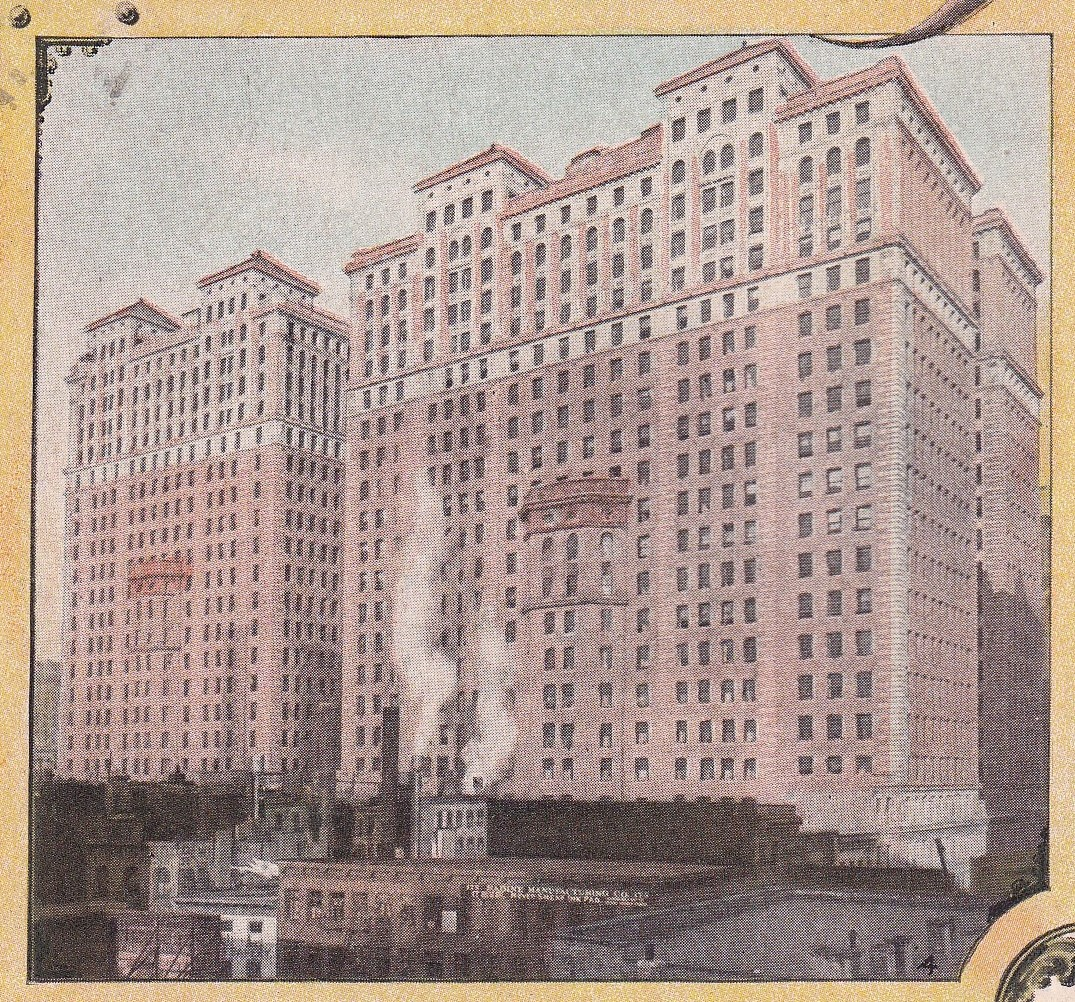
Hudson Terminal, 1910

Two 22-story office skyscrapers were built above the station. The building on the north side was called the Fulton Building while the southern office building was called the Cortlandt Building, reflecting the streets that they abutted. Dey Street bisected the property, passing between the buildings as the city would not allow the street be closed. The two buildings were connected by a pedestrian bridge over the street on the third story of each building. A second bridge connecting the buildings' 17th floors was built in 1913, upon consultation with the Fire Department. Baggage handling facilities in the basements moved baggage from Dey Street to either the baggage room or the baggage trains traveling on Track 5. The railroad station closed in 1971.

=== Other buildings ===
Dey Street was part of Radio Row which was described in 1930 as located on Greenwich Street "where Cortlandt Street intersects it and the Ninth Avenue Elevated forms a canopy over the roadway. ... The largest concentration is in the block bounded by Dey Street on the north and Cortlandt on the south, but Radio Row does not stop there; it overflows around the corner, around several corners, embracing in all some five crowded blocks."

In 1898, The Historical Company, a publishing house, was located at 16 Dey Street.

Construction began on the World Trade Center in 1966. As the complex was based on Hudson Terminal, that portion of Dey Street was eliminated. The Port Authority began acquiring property at the World Trade Center site in March 1965, and demolition work began a year later, clearing thirteen square blocks in Radio Row, thus further reducing Dey Street. Whereas, Day Street previously ran from Broadway to West Street on the waterfront, present day Dey Street runs for just one block, between Broadway and Church. A number of the buildings have frontage and addresses on the neighboring streets, such as Broadway, Church, and Fulton, with side entrances on Dey Street.

== See also ==
- Dey Street Passageway
- Dey Street Books, the HarperCollins imprint
