= Christopher Street (disambiguation) =

Christopher Street is a street in Manhattan, New York.

Christopher Street may also refer to the following subway stations in Manhattan:

- Christopher Street–Stonewall (IRT Broadway–Seventh Avenue Line), a New York City subway station served by the 1 and 2 trains
- Christopher Street (IRT Ninth Avenue Line), a former elevated station
- Christopher Street (PATH station), a PATH subway station

Christopher Street may also refer to:

- Christopher Street (magazine)
- Chris Street, basketball player

Other things related to Christopher Street include:

- Christopher Street Pier
- Christopher Street Day
- The Christopher Street Connection
