= Houston Street station (IRT Ninth Avenue Line) =

Former Manhattan Railway elevated station (closed 1940)

Houston St.

General information
- Location: West Houston Street and Greenwich Street; New York, NY; Lower Manhattan, Manhattan
- Coordinates: 40°43′44.03″N 74°0′31″W
- System: Former Manhattan Railway elevated station
- Operator: Interborough Rapid Transit Company
- Line: Ninth Avenue Line
- Platforms: 2 side platforms
- Tracks: 3

Construction
- Structure type: Elevated

History
- Opened: November 3, 1873; 152 years ago
- Closed: June 11, 1940; 86 years ago

Former services
Preceding station	Interborough Rapid Transit	Following station
Christopher Street toward 155th Street	Ninth Avenue Local	Desbrosses Street toward South Ferry
Location

The Houston Street station was a local station on the demolished IRT Ninth Avenue Line in Manhattan, New York City. It had three tracks and two side platforms. It was served by trains from the IRT Ninth Avenue Line. It opened on November 3, 1873, and closed on June 11, 1940. The next southbound stop was Desbrosses Street. The next northbound stop was Christopher Street.
