= Barclay Street station =

Former Manhattan Railway elevated station (closed 1940)

Barclay St.

General information
- Location: Barclay Street and Greenwich Street; New York, NY; Lower Manhattan, Manhattan
- Coordinates: 40°42′49″N 74°0′42.06″W
- System: Former Manhattan Railway elevated station
- Operator: Interborough Rapid Transit Company
- Line: Ninth Avenue Line
- Platforms: 2 side platforms
- Tracks: 3

Construction
- Structure type: Elevated

History
- Opened: February 14, 1870; 156 years ago
- Closed: June 11, 1940; 86 years ago

Former services
Preceding station	Interborough Rapid Transit	Following station
Warren Street toward 155th Street	Ninth Avenue Local	Cortlandt Street toward South Ferry
Location

The Barclay Street station was a local station on the demolished IRT Ninth Avenue Line in Manhattan, New York City. It had three tracks and two side platforms. It was served by trains from the IRT Ninth Avenue Line. It opened on February 14, 1870 and closed on June 11, 1940. The next southbound stop was Cortlandt Street. The next northbound stop was Warren Street.
