= Christopher Street station (IRT Ninth Avenue Line) =

Former Manhattan Railway elevated station (closed 1940)

Christopher St.
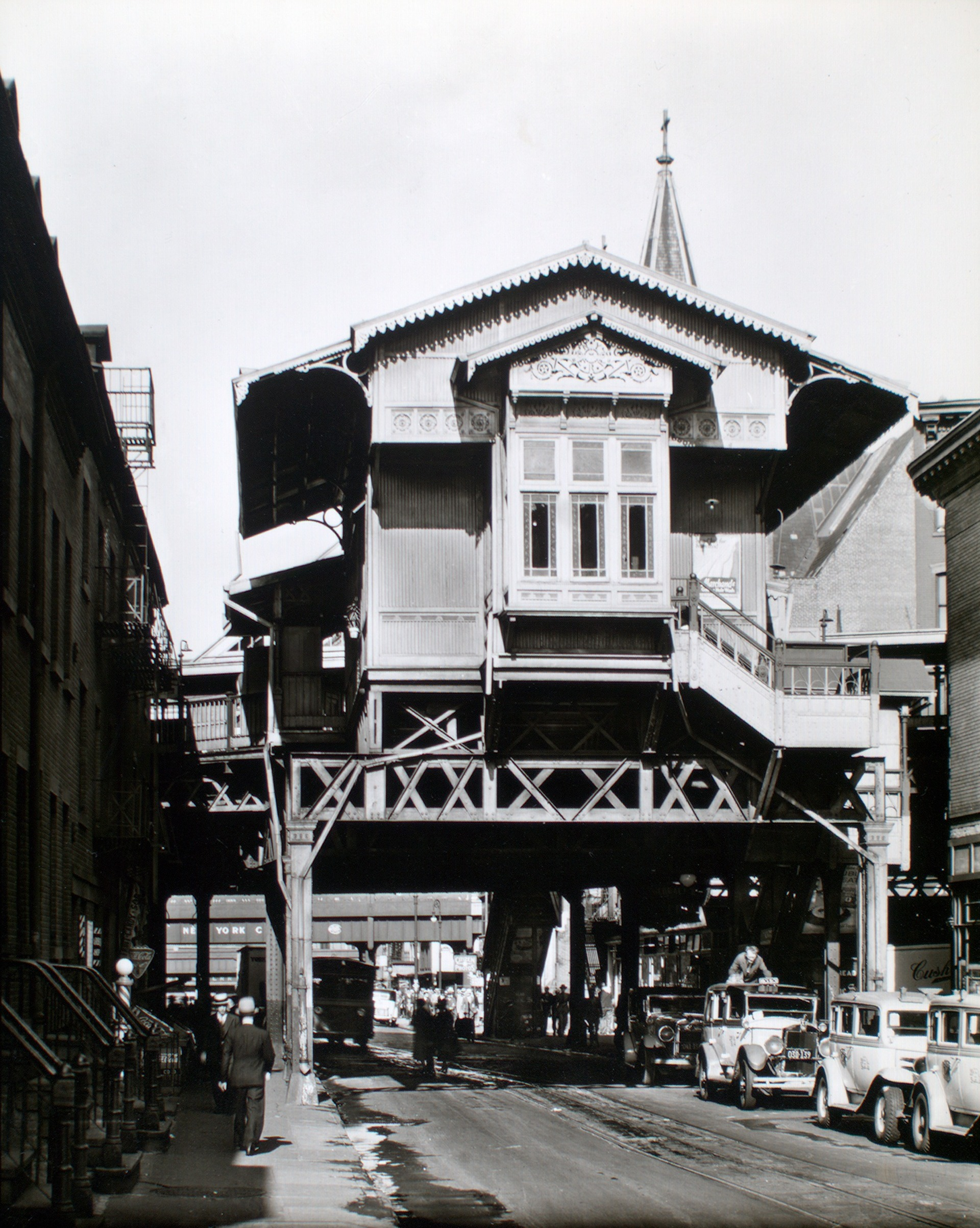

General information
- Location: Christopher Street and Greenwich Street; New York, NY; West Village, Manhattan
- Coordinates: 40°43′58.31″N 74°0′27.14″W
- System: Former Manhattan Railway elevated station
- Operator: Interborough Rapid Transit Company
- Line: Ninth Avenue Line
- Platforms: 2 side platforms 1 island platform
- Tracks: 3

Construction
- Structure type: Elevated

History
- Opened: November 3, 1873; 153 years ago
- Closed: June 11, 1940; 86 years ago

Former services
Preceding station	Interborough Rapid Transit	Following station
14th Street toward Burnside Avenue	Ninth Avenue Express	Desbrosses Street toward Rector Street
14th Street toward 155th Street	Ninth Avenue Local	Houston Street toward South Ferry
Location

The Christopher Street station was an express station on the demolished IRT Ninth Avenue Line in Manhattan in New York City. It had three tracks, one island platform and two side platforms. It was served by trains from the IRT Ninth Avenue Line. It opened on November 3, 1873 and closed on June 11, 1940. On February 25, 1908, the Hudson and Manhattan Railroad built a subway station just east of this station as part of the extension between Hoboken and 33rd Street. The next southbound local stop was Houston Street. The next southbound express stop was Desbrosses Street. The next northbound stop was 14th Street for all trains.
