= Lower Manhattan =

Southern part of Manhattan, New York City

Lower Manhattan Downtown Manhattan Downtown New York City
- Central business district
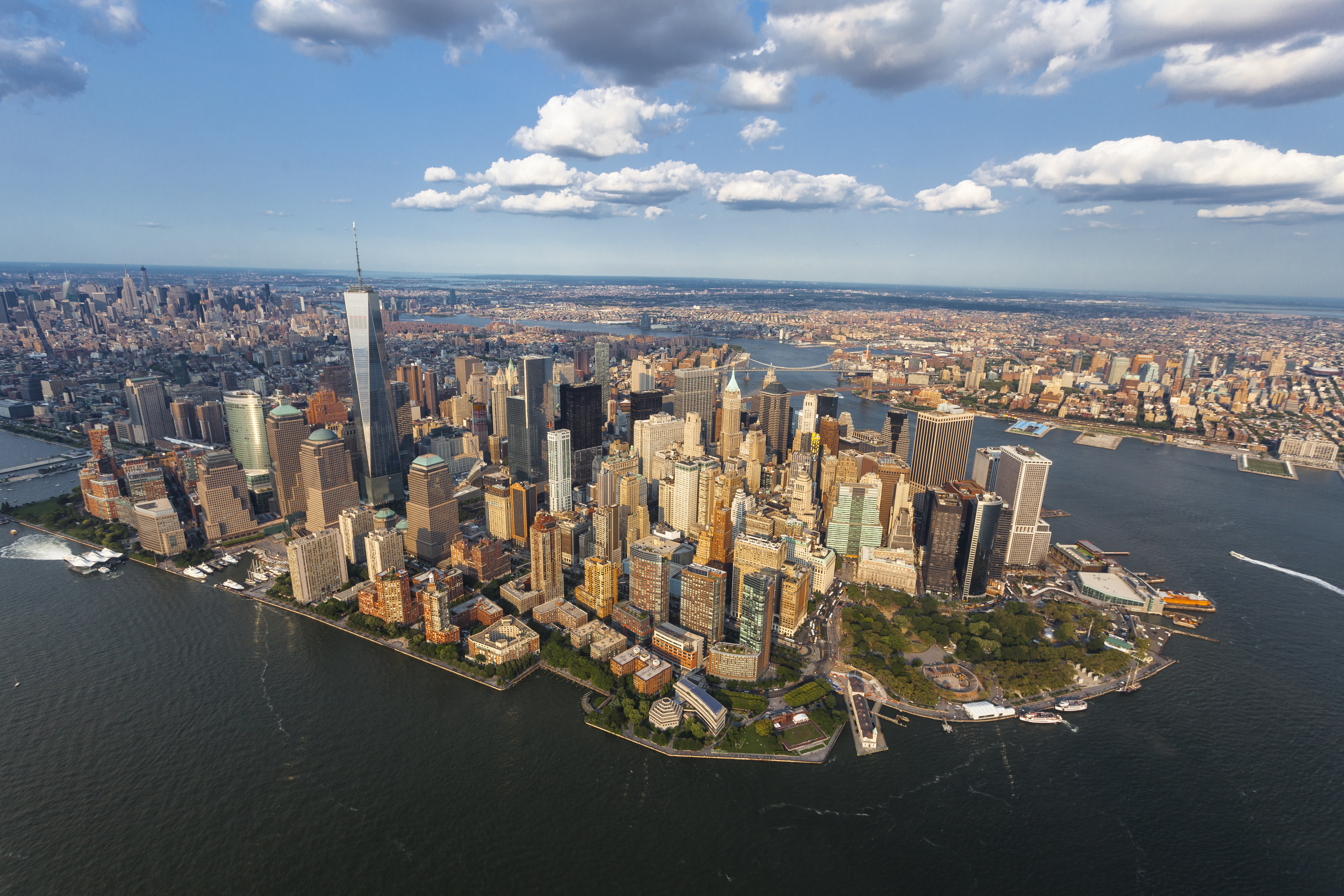
- Lower Manhattan, including Wall Street – a leading financial district, Battery Park, and One World Trade Center as seen in October, 2014– the tallest building in the Western Hemisphere

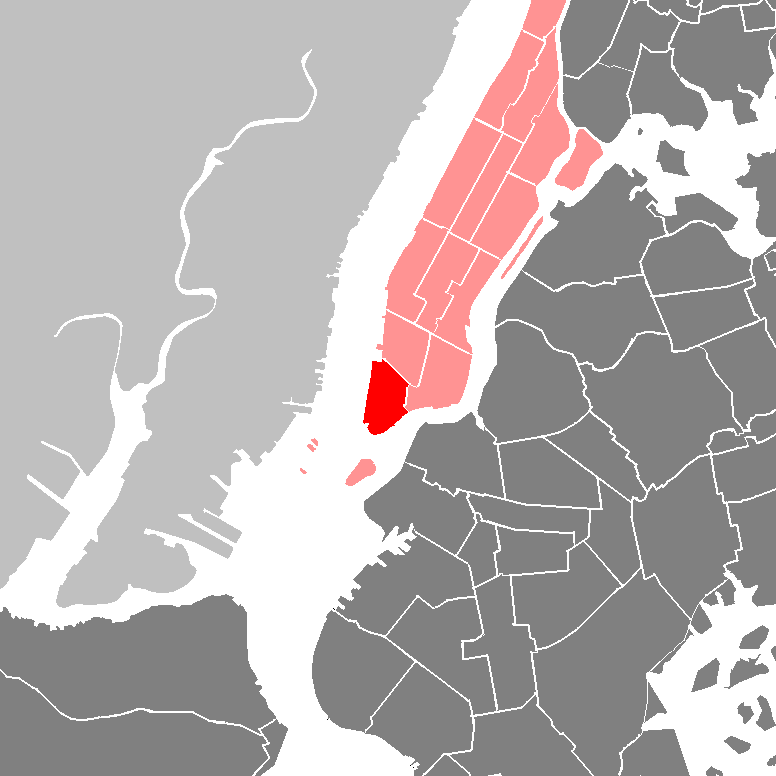
- Coordinates: 40°42′27″N 74°00′43″W
- Country: United States
- State: New York
- City: New York City
- Borough: Manhattan
- Settled: 1626

Population (2010)
  - Total: 382,654
- ZIP Codes: 10004, 10005, 10006, 10007, 10038, 10280, 10012, 10013, 10014
- Area codes: 212, 332, 646, and 917
- Median household income: $201,954

Lower Manhattan, also known as Downtown Manhattan, is the southernmost part of the New York City borough of Manhattan. The area is the historical birthplace of New York City and in the 17th and 18th centuries composed the entirety of the city. Lower Manhattan serves as the seat of government of both Manhattan and the entire City of New York. Because there are no municipally defined boundaries for the area, a precise population cannot be quoted, but several sources have suggested that it was one of the fastest-growing locations in New York City between 2010 and 2020, related to the influx of young adults and significant development of new housing units.

Despite various definitions of Lower Manhattan, they generally include all of Manhattan Island south of 14th Street, with the Bowling Green and the Battery near the southern end. Anchored by Wall Street and the Financial District in Lower Manhattan, New York City is the leading global center for finance and fintech. The Financial District houses the New York Stock Exchange, the Federal Reserve Bank of New York, and other major financial institutions. A center of culture and tourism, Lower Manhattan is home to many of New York City's most iconic structures, including New York City Hall, the Woolworth Building, the Stonewall Inn, the Charging Bull of Wall Street, and One World Trade Center, the tallest skyscraper in the Western Hemisphere.

== Geography and neighborhoods ==
Lower Manhattan is delineated on the north by 14th Street, on the west by the Hudson River, on the east by the East River, and on the south by New York Harbor. Its northern border is designated by thoroughfares about a mile-and-a-half south of 14th Street and a mile north of Manhattan's southern tip around Chambers Street near the Hudson River east of the entrances and overpass to the Brooklyn Bridge. Two other major arteries to Lower Manhattan are Canal Street, roughly half a mile north of Chambers Street, and 23rd Street, roughly half a mile north of 14th Street.

Lower Manhattan's central business district forms the core of the area below Chambers Street and includes the Financial District, commonly known as Wall Street after the name of its primary artery, and the World Trade Center site. At the island's southern tip is Battery Park, near the Bowling Green; City Hall is north of the Financial District. South of Chambers Street are Battery Park City and South Street Seaport. TriBeCa straddles Chambers Street on the west side; at the street's east end is the giant Manhattan Municipal Building. North of Chambers Street and the Brooklyn Bridge and south of Canal Street is the Chinatown neighborhood, home to the largest concentration of Chinese people in the Western Hemisphere. Many court buildings and other government offices are located in this area.

The Lower East Side neighborhood straddles Canal Street. North of Canal Street and south of 14th Street are SoHo, the Meatpacking District, the West Village, Greenwich Village, Little Italy, Nolita, and the East Village. Between 14th and 23rd Streets are lower Chelsea, Union Square, the Flatiron District, Gramercy, and Stuyvesant Town–Peter Cooper Village.

== History ==
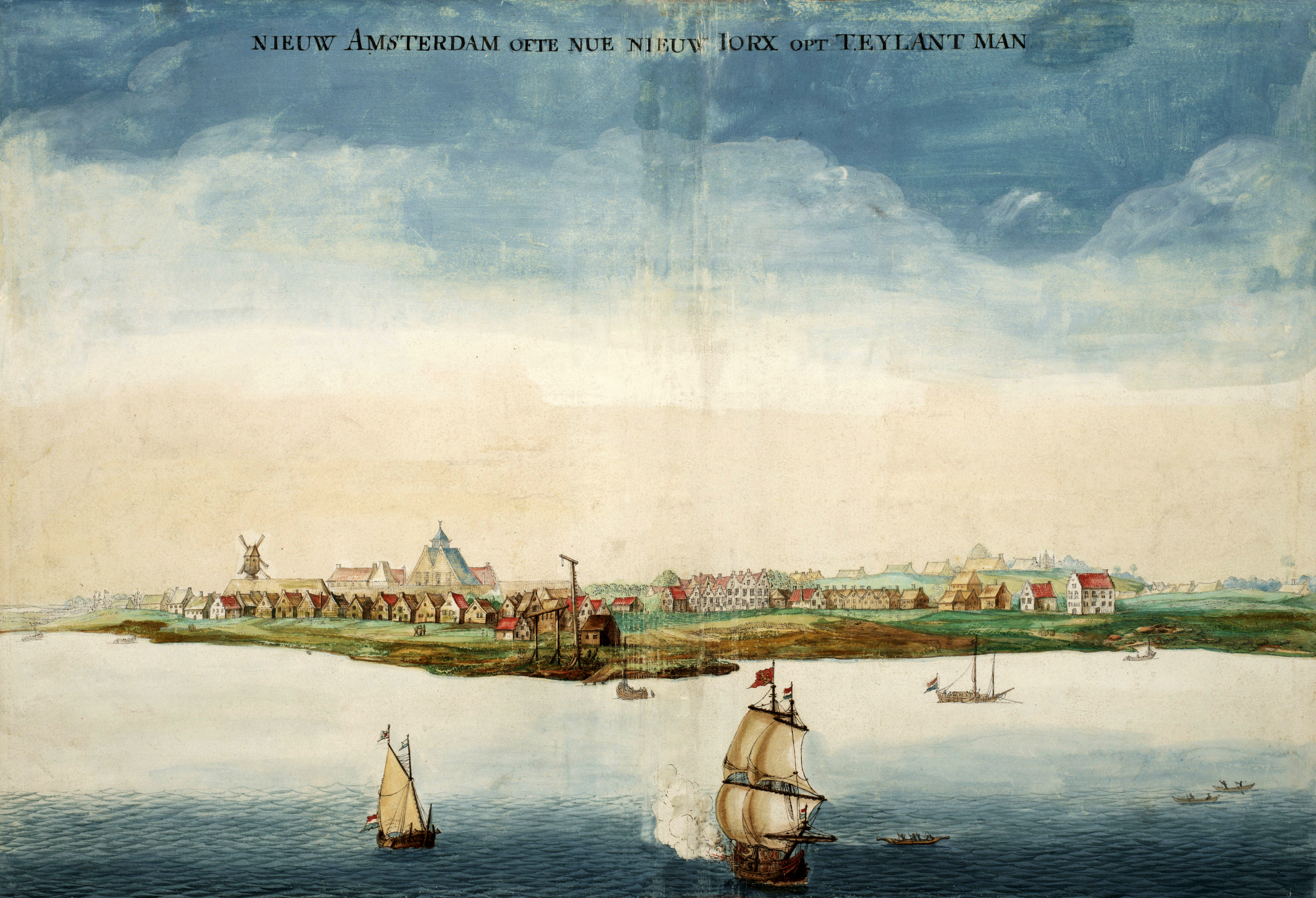
New Amsterdam, centered in what eventually became Lower Manhattan, in 1664, the year England took control and renamed it New York

=== Lenape and New Netherland ===
The area that would eventually encompass modern-day New York City was inhabited by the Lenape people. These groups of culturally and linguistically identical Native Americans who spoke an Algonquian language now referred to as Unami. European settlement began with the founding of a Dutch fur trading post in Lower Manhattan, later called New Amsterdam (Dutch: Nieuw-Amsterdam) in 1626. The first fort was built at The Battery to protect New Netherland.

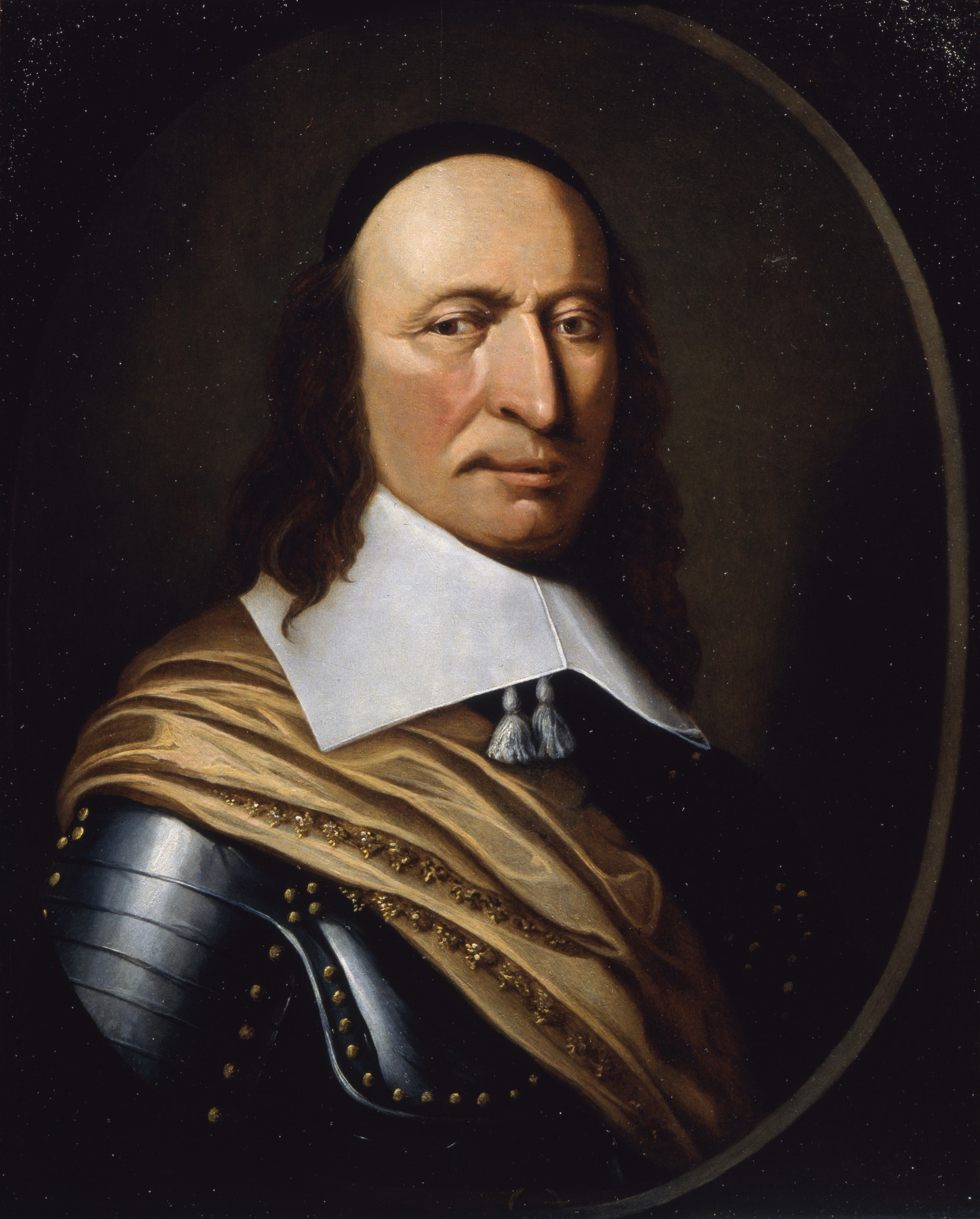
Peter Stuyvesant

In approximately 1626, construction of Fort Amsterdam began. The Dutch West Indies Company subsequently imported African slaves to serve as laborers; they helped to build the wall that defended the town against English and native attacks. Early directors included Willem Verhulst and Peter Minuit. Willem Kieft became a director in 1638 but five years later was embroiled in Kieft's War against the Native Americans. The Pavonia Massacre, across the Hudson River in present-day Jersey City, New Jersey resulted in the death of 80 natives in February 1643. Following the massacre, Algonquian tribes joined forces and nearly defeated the Dutch. The Dutch Republic sent additional forces to the aid of Kieft, leading to the overwhelming defeat of the Native Americans and a peace treaty on August 29, 1645.

On May 27, 1647, Peter Stuyvesant was inaugurated as director general upon his arrival. The colony was granted self-government in 1652, and New Amsterdam was formally incorporated as a city on February 2, 1653. The first mayors (burgemeesters) of New Amsterdam, Arent van Hattem and Martin Cregier, were appointed in that year.

=== 17th and 18th centuries ===
In 1664, the English conquered the area and renamed it "New York" after the Duke of York and the city of York in Yorkshire. At that time, people of African descent made up 20% of the population of the city, with European settlers numbering approximately 1,500, and people of African descent numbering 375 (with 300 of that 375 enslaved and 75 free). While it has been claimed that African slaves comprised 40% of the small population of the city at that time, this claim has not been substantiated. During the mid-1600s, farms of free blacks covered 130 acres (53 ha) where Washington Square Park later developed. The Dutch briefly regained the city in 1673, renaming the city "New Orange", before permanently ceding the colony of New Netherland to the English for what is now Suriname in November 1674. The new English rulers of the formerly Dutch New Amsterdam and New Netherland renamed the settlement back to New York. As the colony grew and prospered, sentiment also grew for greater autonomy. In the context of the Glorious Revolution in England, Jacob Leisler led Leisler's Rebellion and effectively controlled the city and surrounding areas from 1689 to 1691, before being arrested and executed.

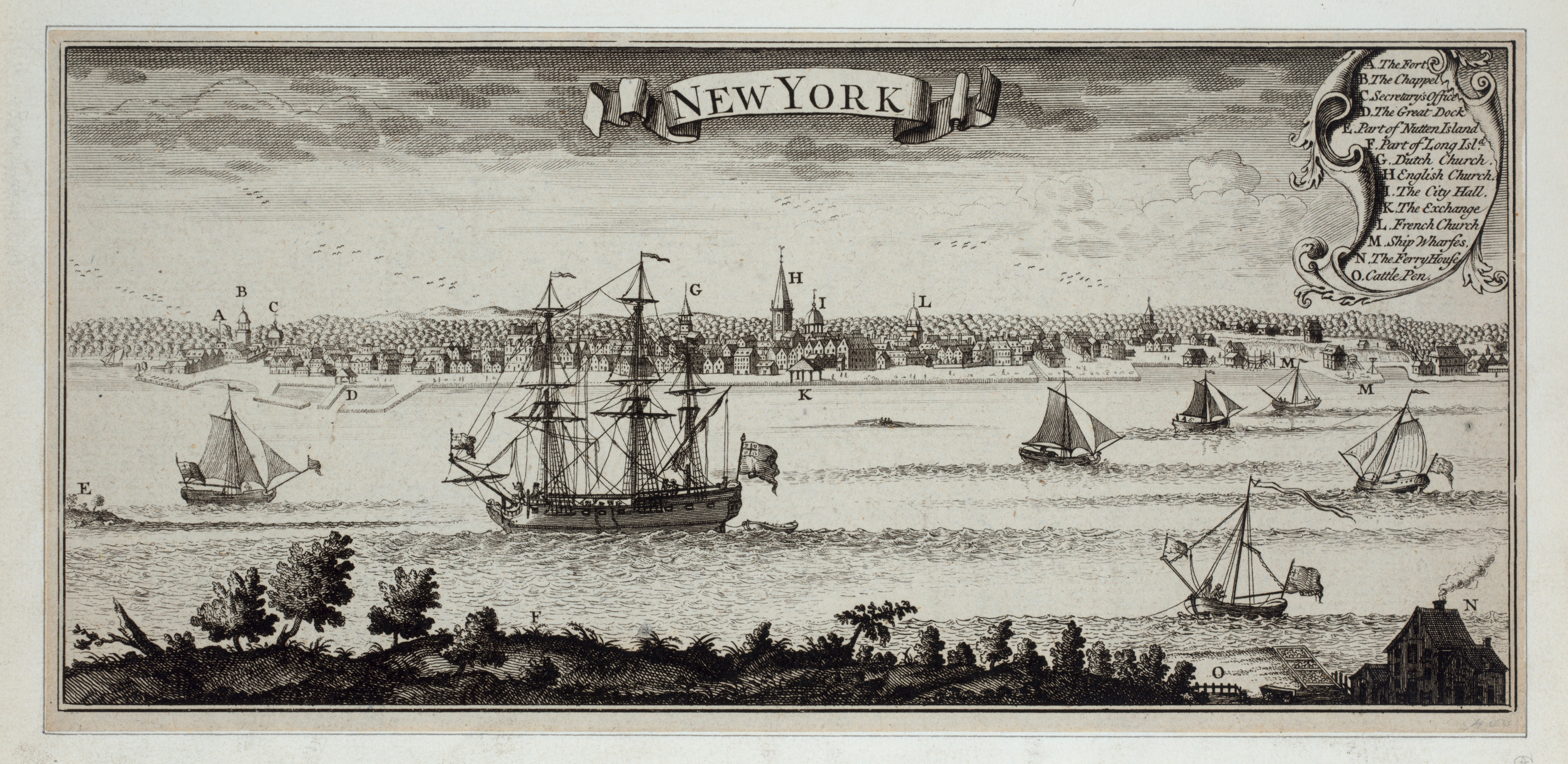
New York Harbor, 1727

By 1700, the Lenape population of New York had diminished to 200. By 1703, 42% of households in New York had slaves, a higher percentage than in Philadelphia or Boston. The 1735 libel trial of John Peter Zenger in the city was a seminal influence on freedom of the press in North America. It would be a standard for the basic articles of freedom in the United States Declaration of Independence. By the 1740s, with expansion of settlers, 20% of the population of New York were slaves, totaling about 2,500 people. After a series of fires in 1741, the city became panicked that blacks planned to burn the city in a conspiracy with some poor whites. Historians believe their alarm was mostly fabrication and fear, but officials rounded up 31 blacks and 4 whites, all of whom were convicted of arson and executed. City officials executed 13 blacks by burning them alive and hanged 4 whites and 18 blacks.

In 1754, Columbia University was founded under charter by George II of Great Britain as King's College in Lower Manhattan. The Stamp Act and other British measures fomented dissent, particularly among the Sons of Liberty, who maintained a long-running skirmish with locally stationed British troops over Liberty Poles from 1766 to 1776. The Stamp Act Congress met in New York City in 1765 in the first organized resistance to British authority across the colonies. After the major defeat of the Continental Army in the Battle of Long Island, General George Washington withdrew to Manhattan Island, but with the subsequent defeat at the Battle of Fort Washington the island was effectively left to the British. The city became a haven for loyalist refugees, becoming a British stronghold for the entire war. Consequently, the area also became the focal point for Washington's espionage and intelligence-gathering throughout the war. In 1771, Bear Market was established along the Hudson River shoreline on land donated by Trinity Church, and replaced by Washington Market in 1813.

New York City was greatly damaged twice by fires of suspicious origin during British military rule. The city became the political and military center of operations for the British in North America for the remainder of the war and a haven for Loyalist refugees. Continental Army officer Nathan Hale was hanged in Manhattan for espionage. In addition, the British began to hold the majority of captured American prisoners of war aboard prison ships in Wallabout Bay, across the East River in Brooklyn. More Americans died from neglect aboard these ships than died in all the battles of the war. British occupation lasted until November 25, 1783. George Washington triumphantly returned to the city that day, as the last British forces left the city.

Starting in 1785, the Congress met in New York City under the Articles of Confederation. In 1789, New York City became the first national capital of the United States under the new United States Constitution. The Constitution also created the current Congress of the United States, and its first sitting was at Federal Hall on Wall Street. The first United States Supreme Court sat there. The United States Bill of Rights was drafted and ratified there. George Washington was inaugurated at Federal Hall. New York City remained the capital of the U.S. until 1790, when the role was transferred to Philadelphia.

=== 19th century ===
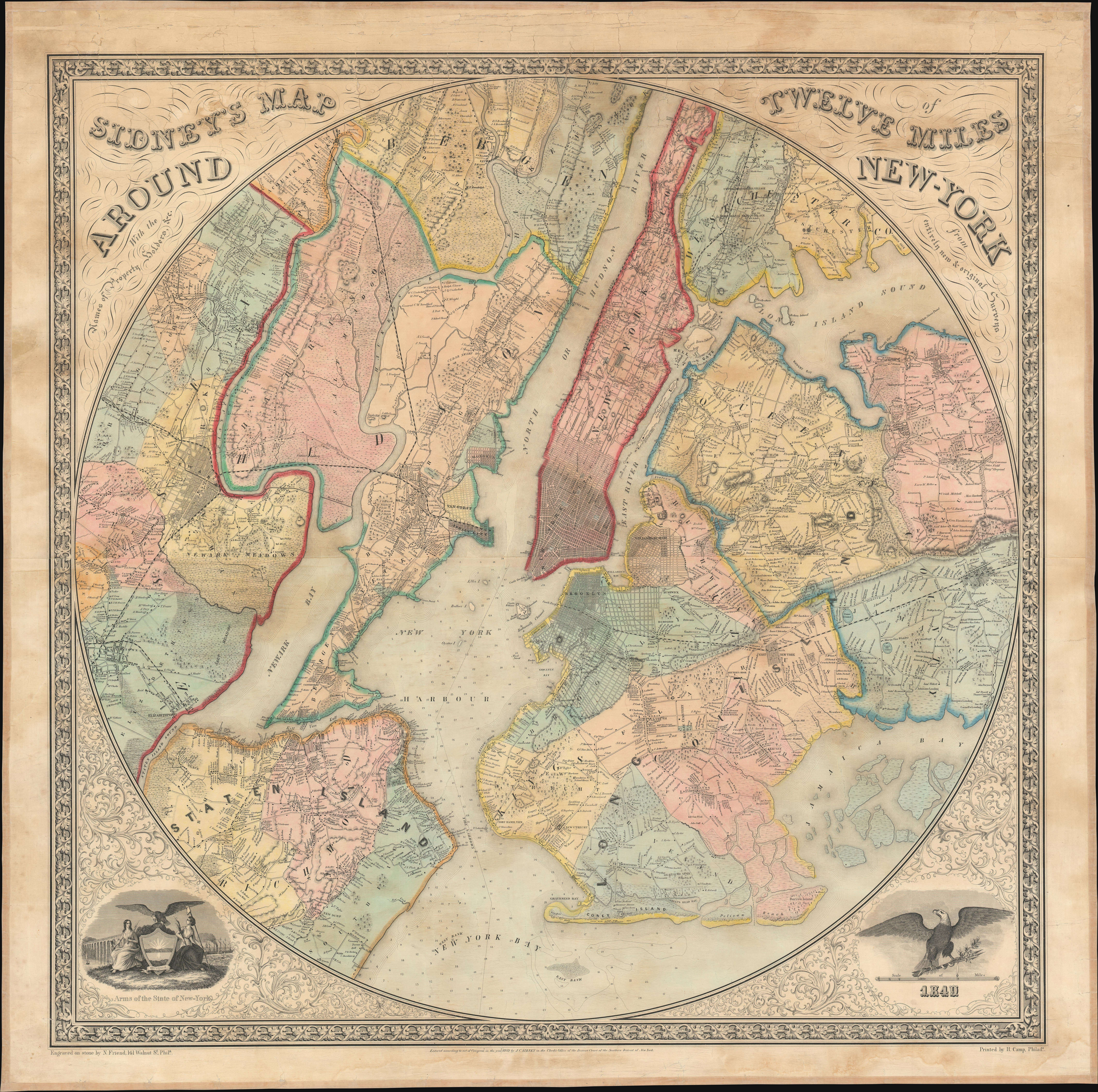
Sidney's Map Twelve Miles Around New York, 1849 lithograph by James Charles Sidney

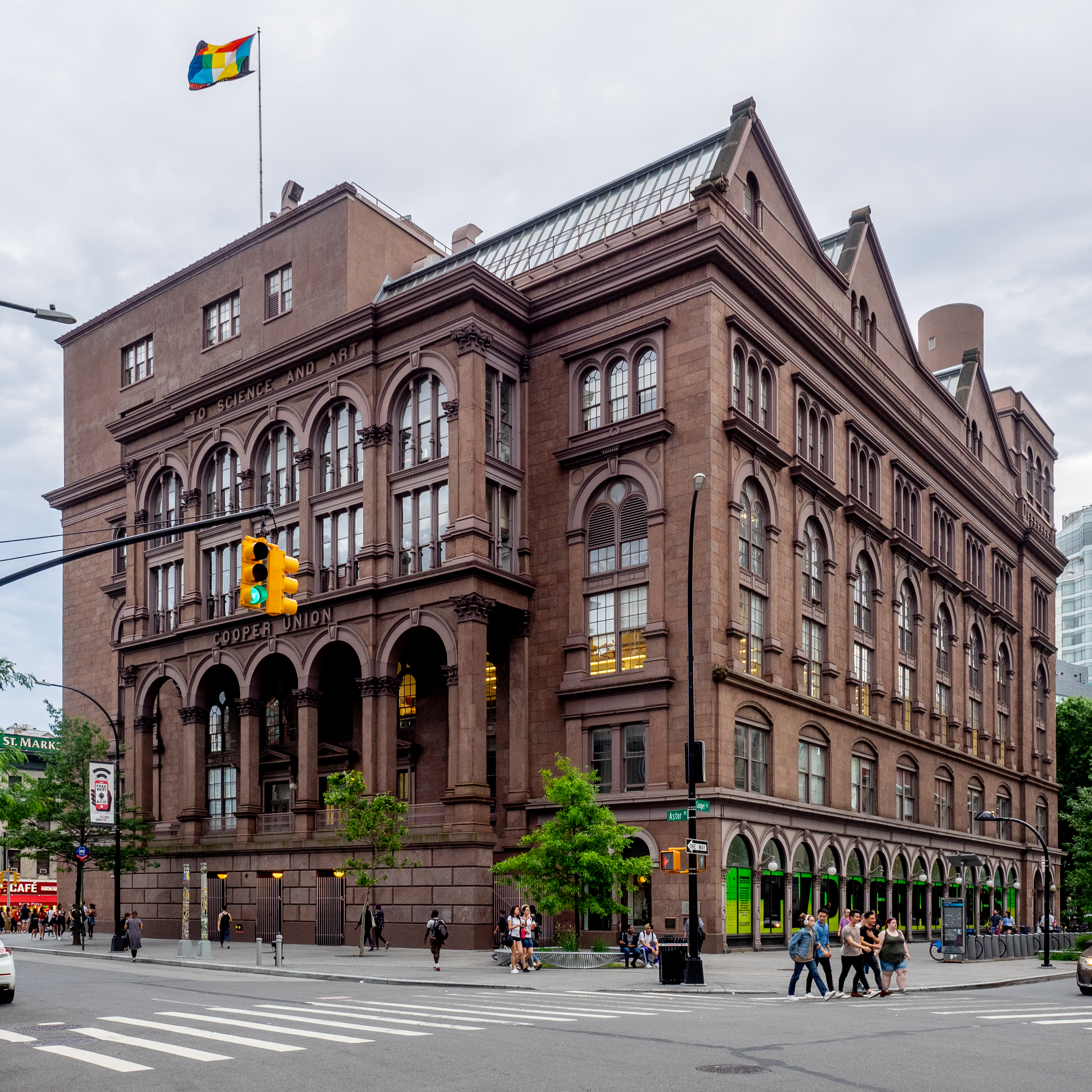
Cooper Union at Astor Place, one of Lower Manhattan's most storied buildings, where Abraham Lincoln gave his famed Cooper Union speech on February 27, 1860

New York grew as an economic center, first as a result of Alexander Hamilton's policies and practices as the first Secretary of the Treasury and, later, with the opening of the Erie Canal in 1825, which connected the Atlantic port to the vast agricultural markets of the North American interior. Immigration resumed after being slowed by wars in Europe, and a new street grid system, the Commissioners' Plan of 1811, expanded to encompass all of Manhattan. Early in the 19th century, the landfill was used to expand Lower Manhattan from the natural Hudson shoreline at Greenwich Street to West Street.

In 1898, the modern City of New York was formed with the consolidation of Brooklyn (until then an independent city), Manhattan and outlying areas. The borough of Brooklyn incorporated the independent City of Brooklyn, recently joined to Manhattan by the Brooklyn Bridge in Lower Manhattan. Municipal governments contained within the boroughs were abolished, and the county governmental functions, housed in Lower Manhattan after unification, were absorbed by the city or each borough.

=== 20th century ===
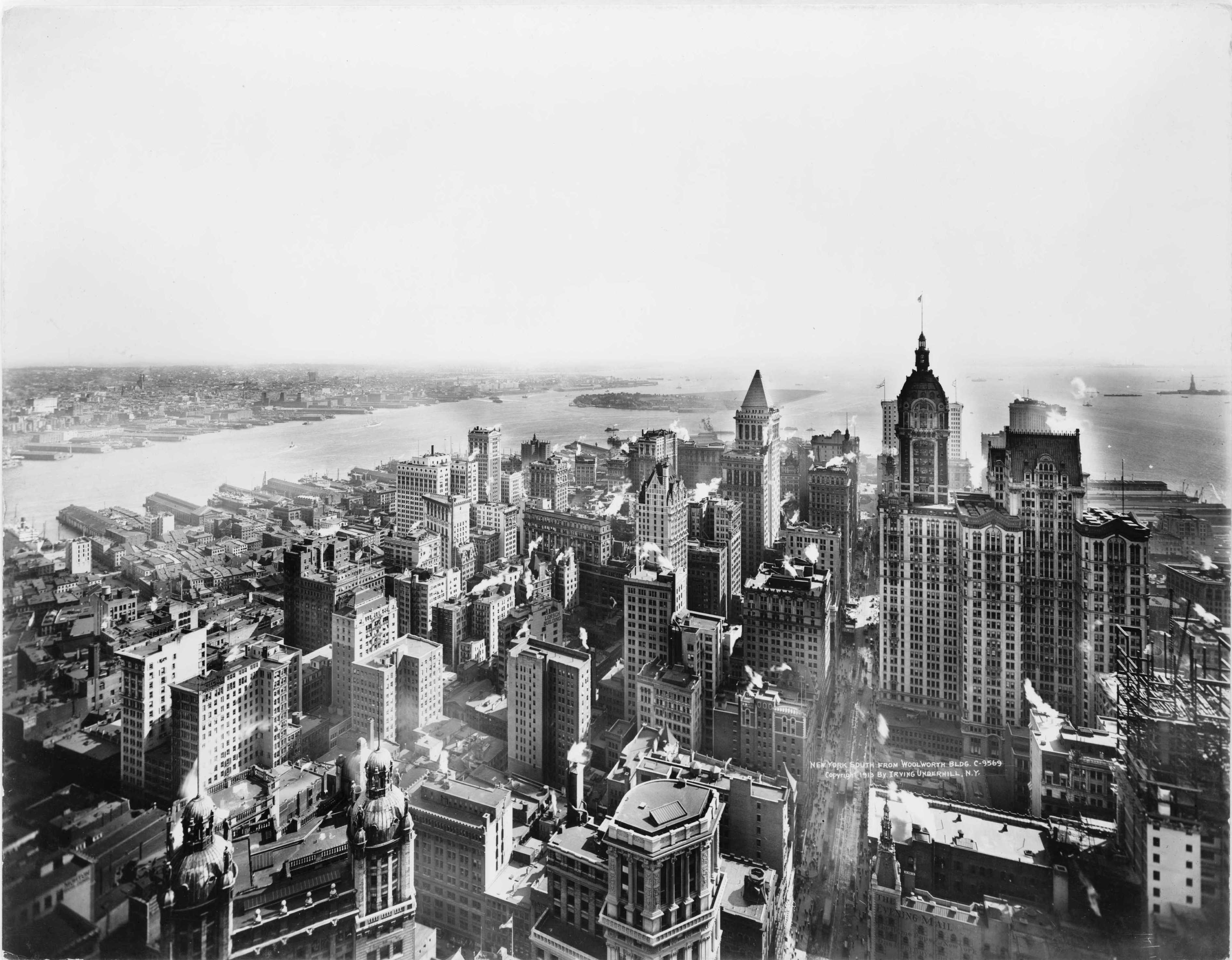
View from the Woolworth Building in 1913

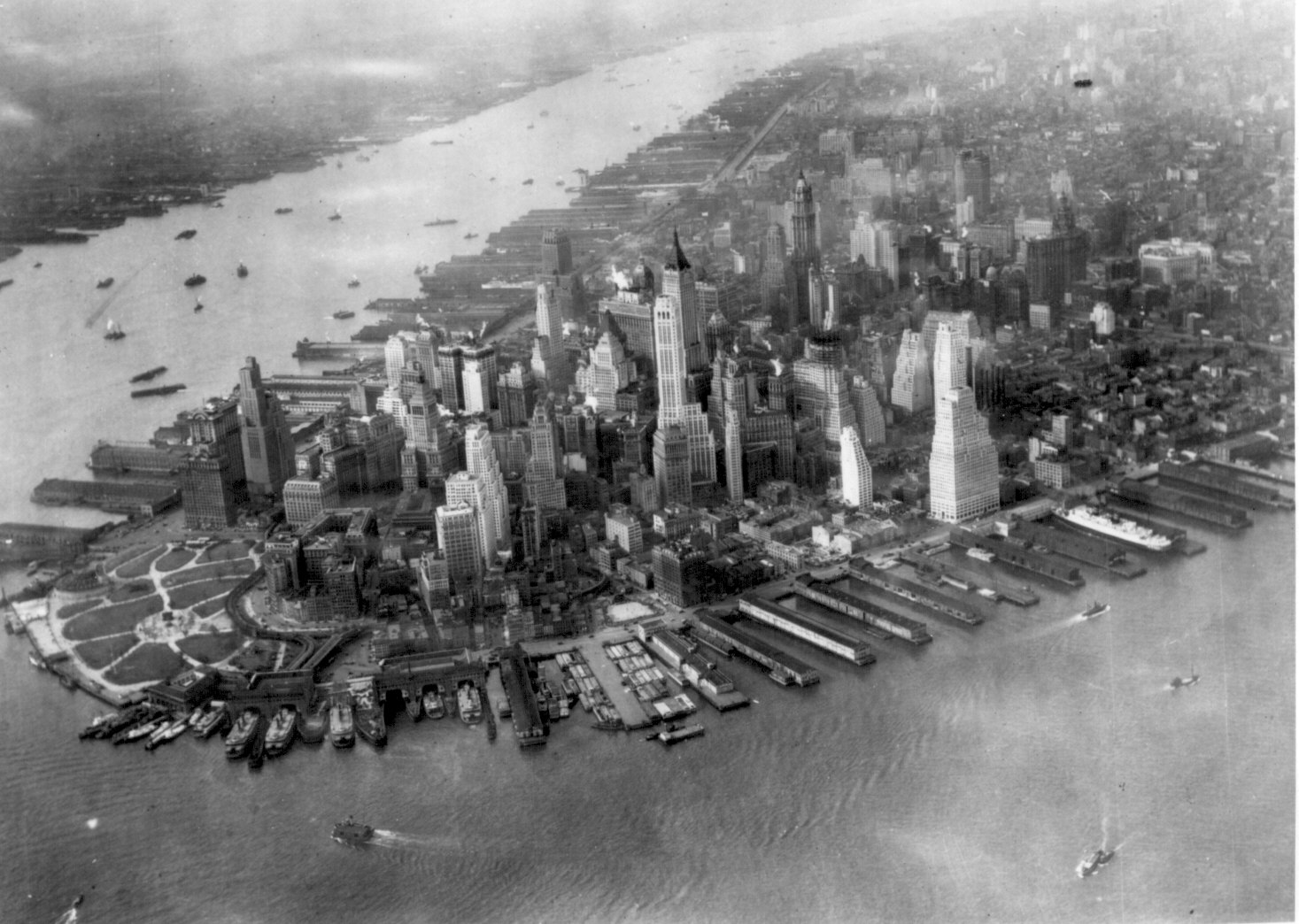
Lower Manhattan in 1931

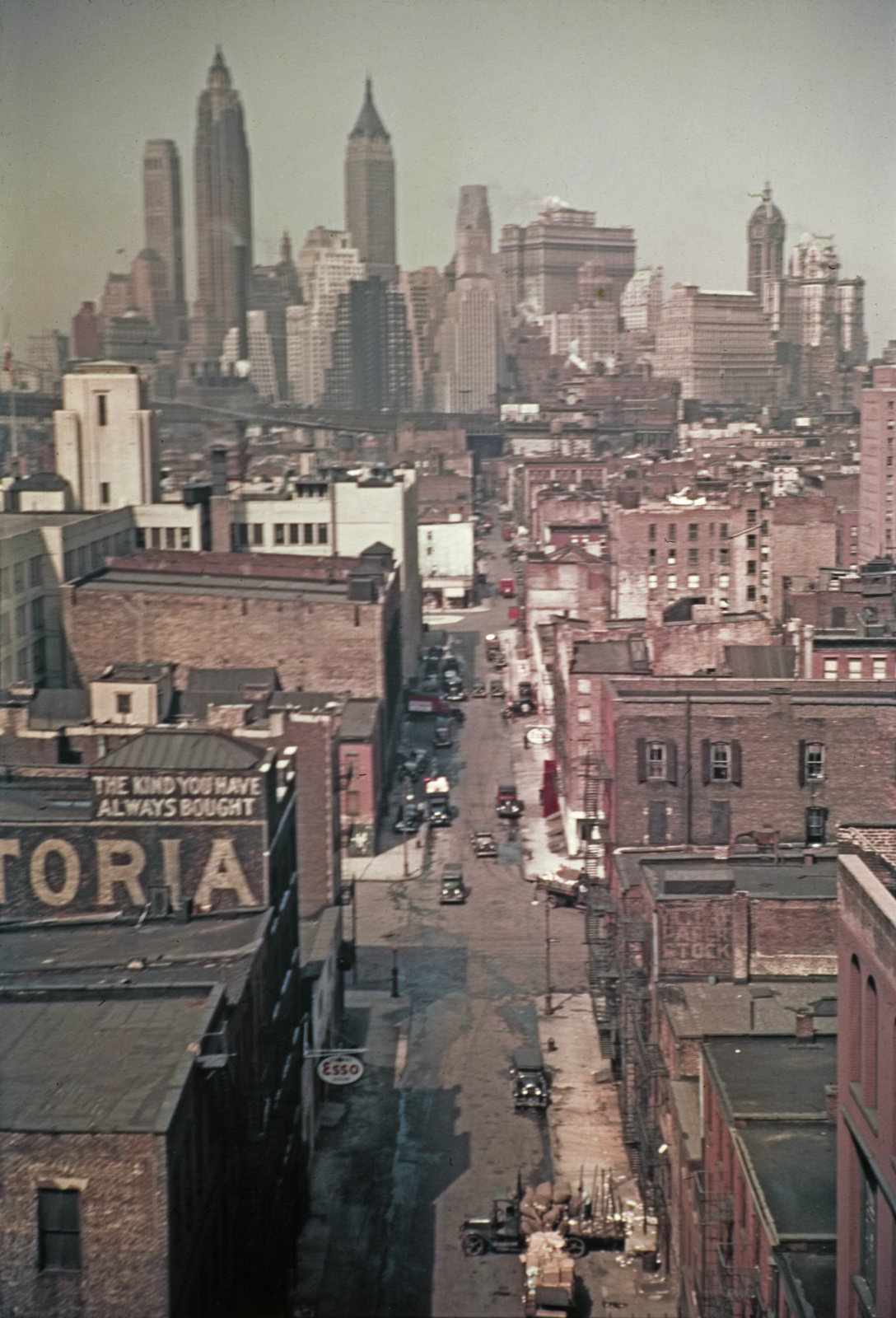
Lower Manhattan photographed in 1938 using Agfacolor

Washington Market was located between Barclay and Hubert Streets, and from Greenwich Street to West Street. It was demolished in the 1960s and replaced by a new Independence Plaza, Washington Market Park, and other developments.

==== Construction boom ====
Lower Manhattan retains the most irregular street grid plans in the borough. Throughout the early decades of the 1900s, the area experienced a construction boom, with major towers such as 40 Wall Street, the American International Building, Woolworth Building, and 20 Exchange Place being erected. Many new water crossings into Lower Manhattan were built at this time, including the Williamsburg Bridge in 1903 and the Manhattan Bridge in 1909. The Holland Tunnel to New Jersey opened in 1927, while the Brooklyn–Battery Tunnel to Brooklyn opened in 1950 and was the last major fixed crossing to be built to Lower Manhattan.

Despite these road connections opening, the economic center of New York City began to shift from Lower Manhattan to Midtown with the opening of many commuter rail terminals at the turn of the 20th century. The original Penn Station opened in 1910, the Hudson and Manhattan Railroad (now PATH) extension to 33rd Street was completed in 1910, and Grand Central Terminal opened in 1913.

On March 25, 1911, the Triangle Shirtwaist Factory fire in Greenwich Village took the lives of 146 garment workers, which eventually led to great advancements in the city's fire department, building codes, and workplace regulations.

Throughout the first half of the 20th century, New York became a world center for industry, commerce, and communication. Interborough Rapid Transit, the first New York City Subway company, began operating in 1904. The area's demographics stabilized, labor unionization brought new protections and affluence to the working class, the city's government and infrastructure underwent a dramatic overhaul under Fiorello La Guardia, and his controversial parks commissioner, Robert Moses, ended the 'blight' of many tenement areas, by demolishing slums, factories, and working-class neighborhoods through public works such as the High line, the West Side Highway and FDR Drive, built housing projects, expanded new parks, rebuilt streets, and zoning controls, especially in Lower Manhattan. The zoning changes were intended to displace the industrial workforce by removing zoning protection for industrial space and incentivizing upscale residential and clerical redevelopment. The port of New York, despite its physical suitability for berthing and its close proximity to Europe, began to deteriorate due to the city's unwillingness to invest or modernise the port and the deindustrialization zoning policy. However a large number of small scale, dynamic, and highly specialized industries persisted despite the city's efforts such as the garment industry which was closely tied to the fashion industry in Midtown, or the printing industry; linked with the publishing industry.

In the 1950s, a few new buildings were constructed in Lower Manhattan, including an 11-story building at 156 William Street in 1955. A 27-story office building at 20 Broad Street, a 12-story building at 80 Pine Street, a 26-story building at 123 William Street, and a few others were built in 1957. By the end of the decade, Lower Manhattan had become economically depressed, in comparison with Midtown Manhattan, which was booming with the continued march uptown. David Rockefeller spearheaded widespread urban renewal efforts in Lower Manhattan, beginning with constructing One Chase Manhattan Plaza, the new headquarters for his bank. He established the Downtown-Lower Manhattan Association (DLMA) which drew up plans for broader revitalization of Lower Manhattan, with the development of a proposed World Trade Center at the heart of these plans. The original DLMA plans called for the "world trade center" to be built along the East River, between Old Slip and Fulton Street. After negotiations with New Jersey Governor Richard J. Hughes, the Port Authority decided to build the World Trade Center on a site along the Hudson River and the West Side Highway, rather than the East River site.

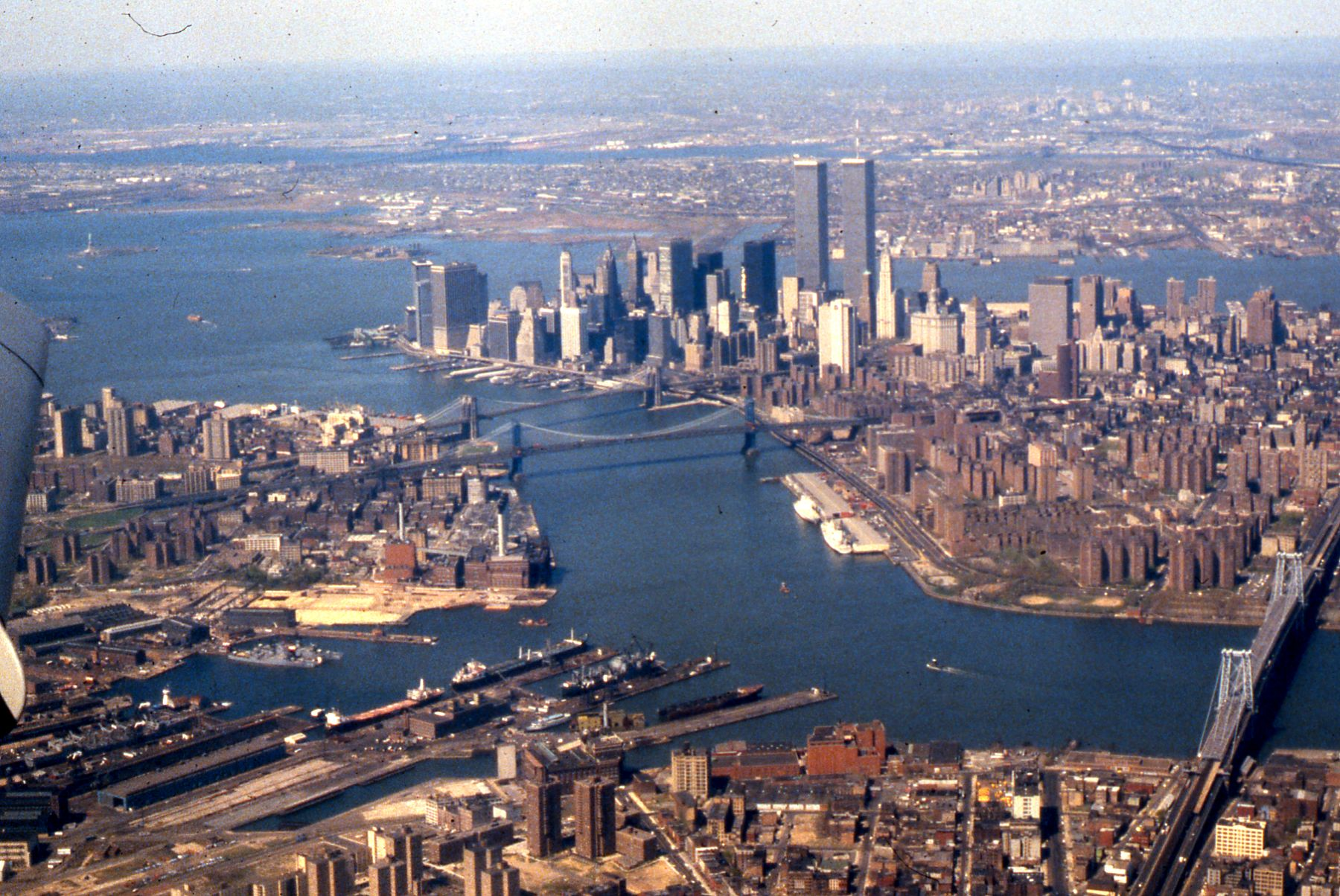
View from an airplane in 1981 prior to the September 11 attacks when the Lower Manhattan skyline was dominated by the Twin Towers of the former World Trade Center

When building the World Trade Center, 1.2 million cubic yards (917,000 m^{3}) of material was excavated from the site. Rather than dumping the spoil at sea or in landfills, the fill material was used to expand the Manhattan shoreline across West Street, creating Battery Park City. The result was a 700-foot (210-m) extension into the river, running six blocks or 1,484 feet (452 m), covering 92 acres (37 ha), providing a 1.2-mile (1.9 km) riverfront esplanade and over 30 acres (12 ha) of parks.

Through much of its history, the area south of Chambers Street was mainly a commercial district, with a small population of residents—in 1960, it was home to about 4,000. Construction of Battery Park City, on landfill from construction of the World Trade Center, brought many new residents to the area. Gateway Plaza, the first Battery Park City development, was finished in 1983. The project's centerpiece, the World Financial Center, consists of four luxury highrise towers. By the turn of the century, Battery Park City was mostly completed, with the exception of some ongoing construction on West Street. Around this time, Lower Manhattan reached its highest population of business tenants and full-time residents. These developments struggled to become fully occupied at desirable rents, with relatively high vacancy rates.

In 1993, the Downtown Lower Manhattan Association contributed to a city plan calling for the revitalization of Lower Manhattan. The plan included recommended zoning changes, tax incentives to encourage new tenants, and the conversion of commercial buildings into apartments. It also called for the creation of a business improvement district, called The Alliance for Downtown New York, to help spur the area's renewal. Between 1995 and 2014, 15.8 million square feet of office space was converted to residential or hotel use. As a result, Lower Manhattan's residential population rose from 14,000 to 60,000.

=== 21st century ===
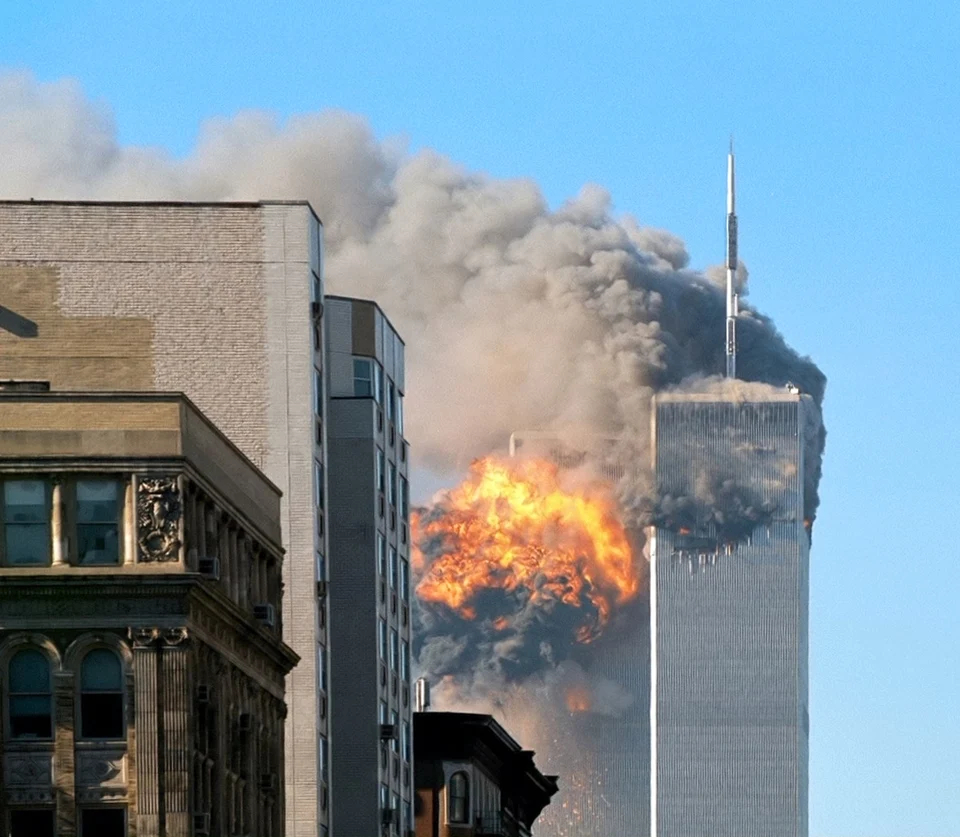
United Airlines Flight 175 hits the South Tower of the original World Trade Center on September 11, 2001

The Lower Manhattan skyline viewed from Governors Island

In the early 21st century, the Meatpacking District, once the sparsely populated province of after-hours BDSM clubs and transgender prostitutes, gained a reputation as New York City's trendiest neighborhood.

==== September 11 attacks ====
During the September 11 attacks in 2001, two of four hijacked planes were flown into the Twin Towers of the original World Trade Center, and the towers collapsed. The 7 World Trade Center was not struck by a plane but uncontrolled fires that were caused by falling debris resulted in the building's collapse; a first in the history of steel framed skyscrapers. The 3, 4, 5, and 6 World Trade Center buildings were damaged beyond repair or destroyed, and soon after demolished. The collapse of the Twin Towers also caused extensive damage to surrounding buildings and skyscrapers in Lower Manhattan. A total of 2,753 people, including those on the planes, were killed in New York. About 400,000 people, including rescue workers and residents of the area were exposed to toxic dust and debris; many developed serious respiratory illnesses, cancers, and other harms arising from the attack, and 3,496 died.

==== Post-9/11 rebuilding ====
Following September 11, Lower Manhattan lost much of its economy and office space but has since rebounded significantly. Private sector employment reached 233,000 at the end of 2016, the highest levels since the end of 2001. This was largely due to growth and diversification in the local workforce with gains in employment sectors like Technology, Advertising, Media and Information, as well as Hotel, Restaurants, Retailing, and Health care. As of 2016, Lower Manhattan's business district is home to approximately 700 retail stores and 500 bars and restaurants.

The Lower Manhattan Development Corporation has consummated plans to rebuild downtown Manhattan by adding new streets, buildings, and office space. The National September 11 Memorial at the site was opened to the public on September 11, 2011, while the National September 11 Museum was officially inaugurated by President Barack Obama on May 15, 2014. As of the time of its opening in November 2014, the new One World Trade Center, formerly known as the Freedom Tower, is the tallest skyscraper in the Western Hemisphere and the seventh-tallest in the world, at 1,776 feet (541 m); while other skyscrapers are under construction at the site.

The Occupy Wall Street protests in Zuccotti Park, formerly known as Liberty Plaza Park, began in the Financial District on September 17, 2011, receiving global attention and spawning the Occupy movement against social and economic inequality worldwide.

On October 29 and 30, 2012, Hurricane Sandy ravaged portions of Lower Manhattan with record-high storm surge from New York Harbor, severe flooding, and high winds, causing power outages for hundreds of thousands of Manhattanites and leading to gasoline shortages and disruption of mass transit systems. The storm and its effects have prompted the discussion of constructing seawalls and other coastal barriers around the shorelines of Manhattan and the New York City metropolitan region to minimize the risk of destructive consequences from another such event in the future.

Lower Manhattan has been experiencing a baby boom, well above the overall birth rate in Manhattan, with the area south of Canal Street witnessing 1,086 births in 2010, 12% greater than 2009 and over twice the number born in 2001. The Financial District alone saw its population grow to approximately 43,000 as of 2014, nearly double the 23,000 recorded at the 2000 Census.

There are currently 61,000 residents in the Financial District of Lower Manhattan south of Chambers Street and more than 62 percent of the population is between 18 and 44. Lower Manhattan is home to more young professionals than Greenpoint, the East Village, and Downtown Brooklyn and on par with Downtown Jersey City and Williamsburg.

In June 2015, The New York Times wrote that Lower Manhattan's dining scene was experiencing a renaissance. There are over 400 casual dining and more than 100 full-service dining restaurants in the area. The Village Voice, based at 80 Maiden Lane in the Financial District and historically the largest alternative newspaper in the United States, announced in 2017 that it would cease publication of its print edition and convert to a fully digital venture.

Since 2010, a Lower Manhattan community known as Little Australia has emerged and is growing in the Nolita neighborhood.

=== Historical sites ===
Before the September 11 attacks, the Twin Towers were iconic of Lower Manhattan's global significance as a financial center. The new office towers built since the attack (including One World Trade Center) have transformed the skyline of Lower Manhattan. The 9/11 Memorial & Museum at the former World Trade Center site has become a popular draw for visitors. New York City has been described as the gay capital of the world, and the epicenter of LGBT culture and its catalyst as a continuing cultural force in modern society has been the Stonewall Inn in Greenwich Village. Similarly, Chinatown, which was spawned just east of the original Five Points neighborhood of Lower Manhattan, was born in the 1850s and continues to be the epicenter of culture for the Chinese diaspora.

Lower Manhattan contains many more historical buildings and sites, including Castle Clinton, Bowling Green, the old United States Customs House (now the National Museum of the American Indian), Federal Hall National Memorial commemorating the site where George Washington was inaugurated as the first U.S. President, Fraunces Tavern, New York City Hall, the Museum of American Finance, the New York Stock Exchange Building, South Street Seaport, the Brooklyn Bridge, South Ferry (the embarkation point for the Staten Island Ferry), and Trinity Church. Lower Manhattan is home to some of New York City's most spectacular skyscrapers, including the Woolworth Building, 40 Wall Street (also known as the Trump Building), 26 Wall Street (also known as the Standard Oil Building), and 70 Pine Street (also known as the American International Building).

In 1966, the commercial district of Radio Row on Cortlandt Street was demolished to make way for construction of the former World Trade Center.

== Culture ==
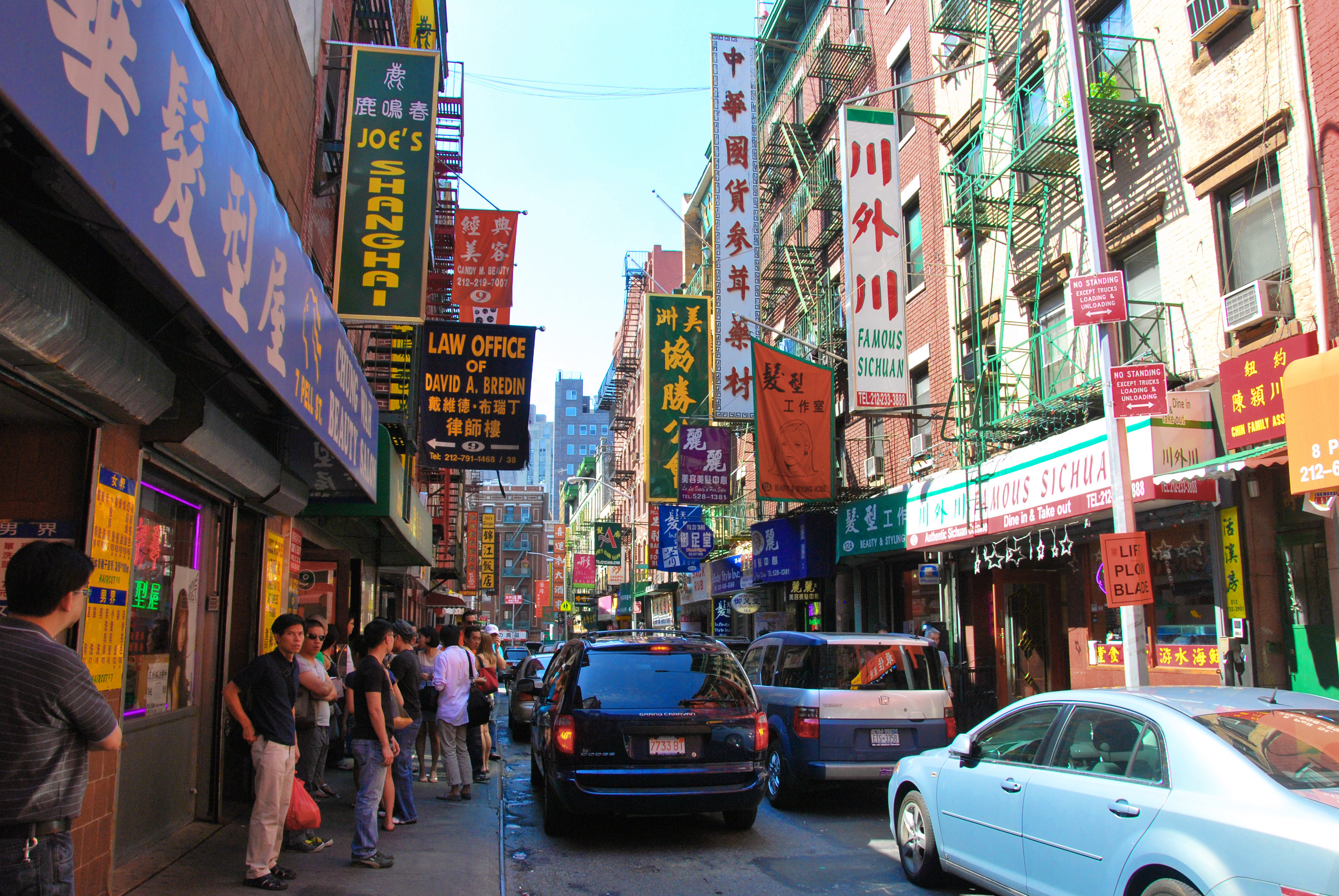
Chinatown is home to the highest concentration of Overseas Chinese in the Western Hemisphere

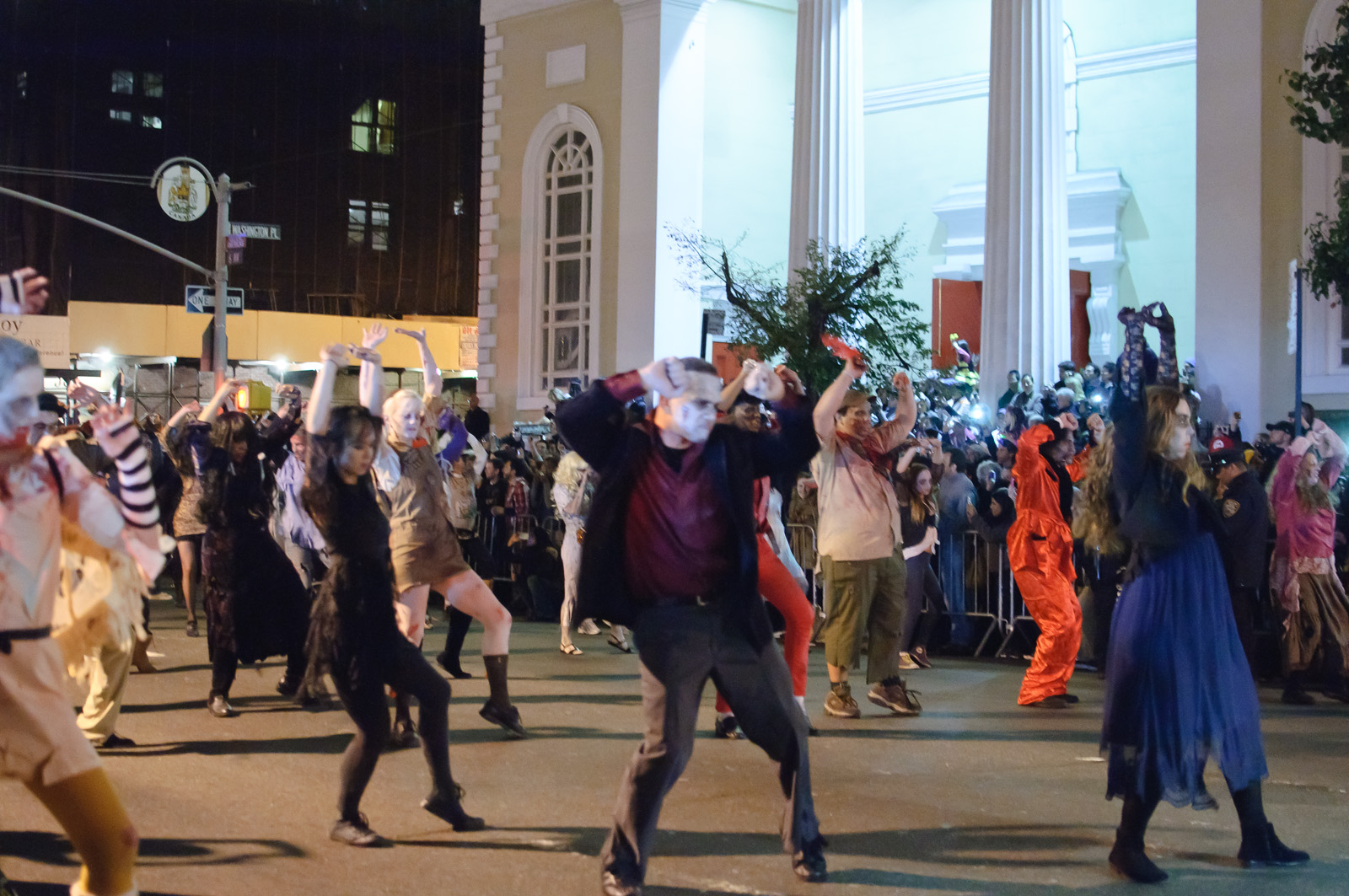
The annual Village Halloween Parade in Greenwich Village is the world's largest Halloween parade, with millions of spectators annually.

Since the early-20th century, Lower Manhattan has been an important center for the arts and leisure activities. Greenwich Village was a locus of bohemian culture from the first decade of the century through the 1980s. Several of the city's leading jazz clubs are still located in Greenwich Village, which was also one of the primary bases of the American folk music revival of the 1960s. Many art galleries were located in SoHo between the 1970s and early 1990s; today, the downtown Manhattan gallery scene is centered in Chelsea. From the 1960s onward, Lower Manhattan has been home to many alternative theater companies, constituting the heart of the Off-Off-Broadway community.

Punk rock and its musical derivatives emerged in the mid-1970s largely at two Lower Manhattan venues, CBGB on Bowery in the western edge of the East Village, and Max's Kansas City on Park Avenue South. At the same time, the area's surfeit of appropriated industrial lofts, played an integral role in the development and sustenance of the minimalist composition, free jazz, disco, and electronic dance music subcultures. The area's many nightclubs and bars, though mostly shorn of the freewheeling iconoclasm, pioneering spirit, and do-it-yourself mentality that characterized the pre-gentrification era, still draw patrons from throughout the city and the surrounding region.

=== Denotation of Downtown ===
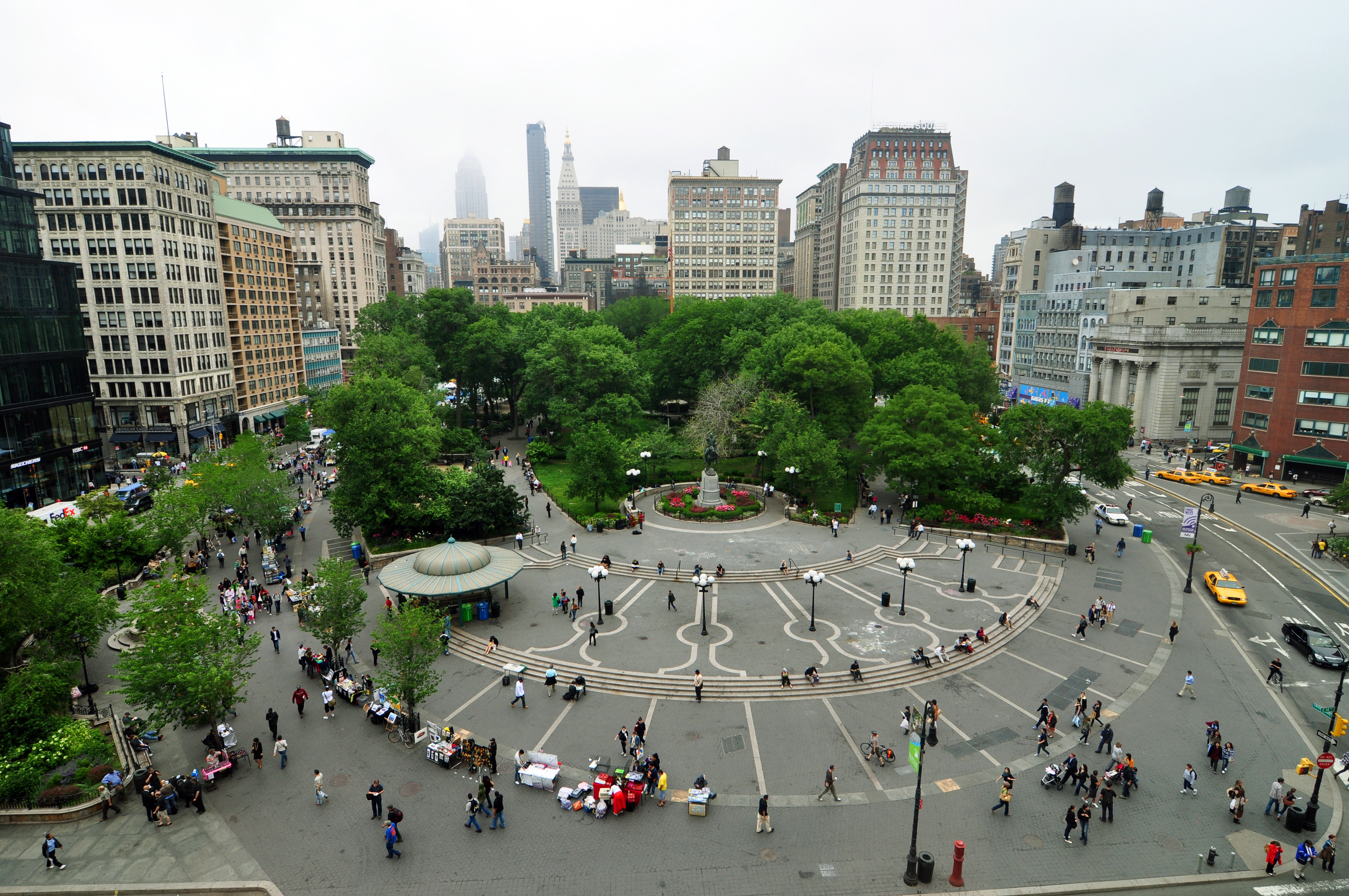
Union Square and its surrounding neighborhood, located between 14th and 17th Streets, may be considered a part of either Lower or Midtown Manhattan.

Downtown in the context of Manhattan, and of New York City generally, has different meanings to different people, especially depending on where in the city they reside. Residents of the island or of The Bronx generally speak of going "downtown" to refer to any southbound excursion to any Manhattan destination. A declaration that one is going to be "downtown" may indicate a plan to be anywhere south of 14th Street—the definition of downtown according to the city's official tourism marketing organization—or even 23rd Street. The full phrase Downtown Manhattan may also refer more specifically to the area of Manhattan south of Canal Street. Within business-related contexts, many people use the term Downtown Manhattan to refer only to the Financial District and the corporate offices in the immediate vicinity. For instance, the Business Improvement District managed by the Alliance for Downtown New York defines Downtown as south of Murray Street (essentially South of New York City Hall), which includes the World Trade Center area and the Financial District. The phrase Lower Manhattan may apply to any of these definitions: the broader ones often if the speaker is discussing the area in relation to the rest of the city; more restrictive ones, again, if the focus is on business matters or on the colonial and early post-colonial history of the island.

As reflected in popular culture, "Downtown" in Manhattan has historically represented a place where one could "forget all your troubles, forget all your cares, and go Downtown," as the lyrics of Petula Clark's 1964 hit "Downtown" celebrate (although Tony Hatch, the songwriter of the track, later clarified that he naively believed Times Square to be "downtown", and was the actual inspiration for the hit single). The protagonist of Billy Joel's 1983 hit "Uptown Girl" contrasts himself (a "downtown man") with the purportedly staid uptown world. Likewise, the chorus of Neil Young's 1995 single "Downtown" urges "Let's have a party, downtown all right."

== Economy ==
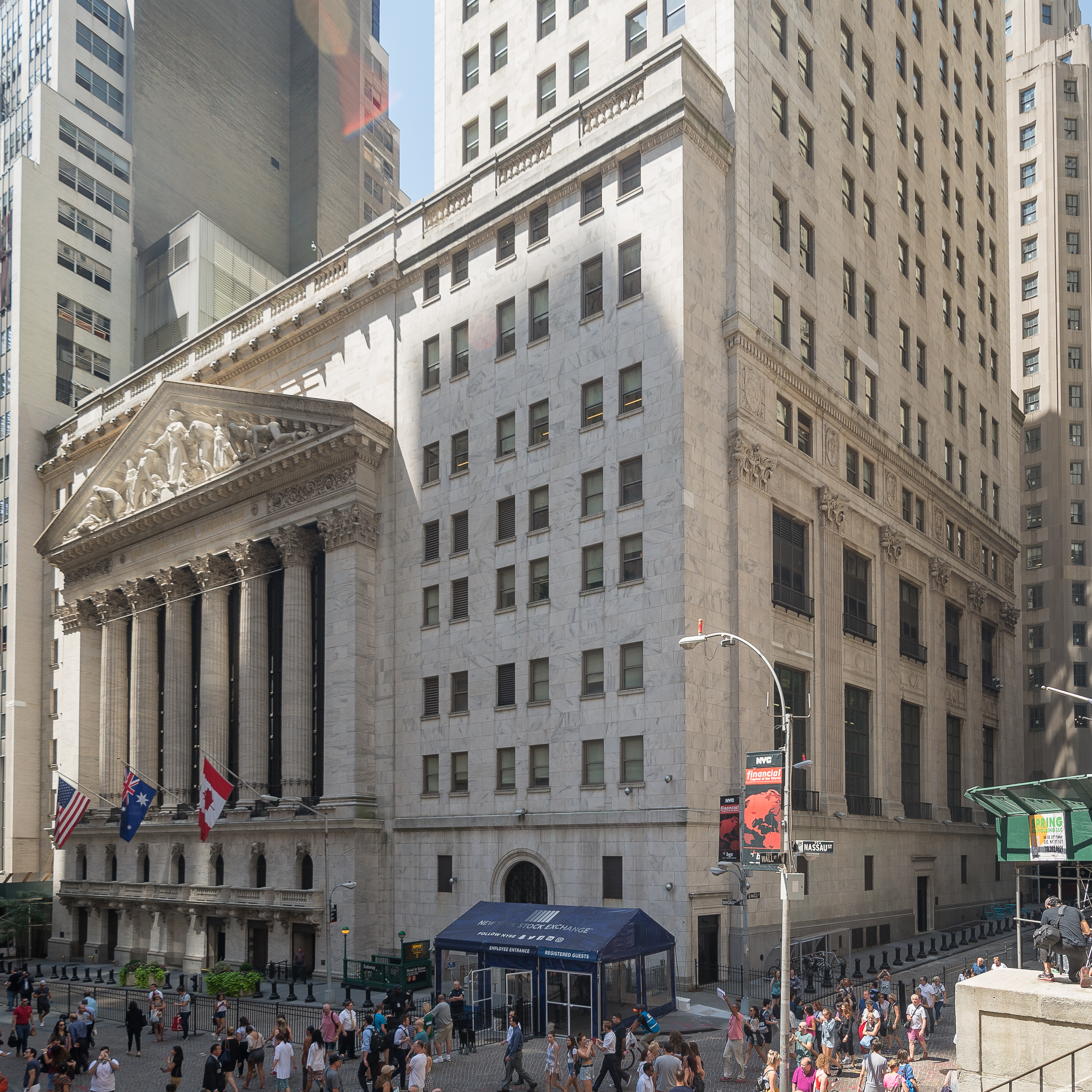
The New York Stock Exchange is, by a significant margin, the world's largest stock exchange with a $23.1 trillion market capitalization of its listed companies as of April 2018. Pictured is the exchange's building on Wall Street.

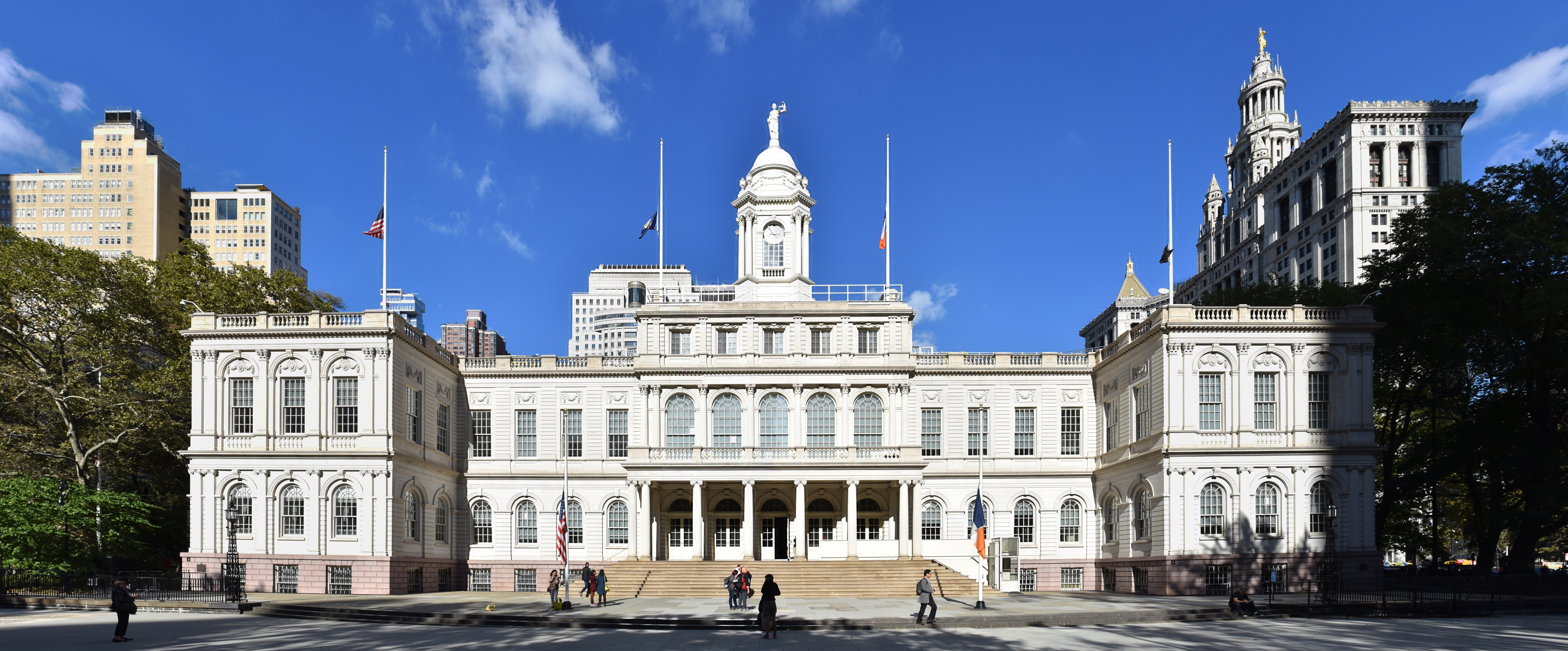
New York City Hall in Lower Manhattan's Civic Center neighborhood

Lower Manhattan is the third-largest business district in the United States, after Midtown Manhattan and the Chicago Loop. Anchored by Wall Street in Lower Manhattan, New York City functions as the financial and fintech center of the world and has been called the world's most economically powerful city. Lower Manhattan is home to the New York Stock Exchange, at 11 Wall Street, and the corporate headquarters of NASDAQ, at 165 Broadway, representing the world's largest and second largest stock exchanges, respectively, when measured both by overall average daily trading volume and by total market capitalization of their listed companies in 2013. Wall Street investment banking fees in 2012 totaled approximately US$40 billion.

Other large companies with headquarters in Lower Manhattan include (in alphabetical order):

- AIG, 175 Water Street
- Ambac Financial Group
- AOL, at 770 Broadway
- BARKER, 30 Broad Street
- Condé Nast, One World Trade Center, publisher of Vogue, W, Vanity Fair, The New Yorker, and other publications
- EmblemHealth and Standard & Poor's, at 55 Water Street HIP Health Plan of New York, which became a part of EmblemHealth, moved there with 2,000 employees in October 2004. It was the largest corporate relocation in downtown Manhattan following the September 11 attacks.
- Goldman Sachs, at 200 West Street
- Group M, 3 World Trade Center
- Hudson's Bay Company, Brookfield Place, the parent company of Saks, Lord and Taylor and Gilt Groupe
- IBT Media, publisher of the International Business Times and Newsweek, among other publications; located in Hanover Square
- Nielsen Company and subsidiary Nielsen Media Research
- PR Newswire, at 350 Hudson Street
- Spotify, 4 World Trade Center
- Verizon Communications, at 140 West Street

Prior to the September 11 attacks, One World Trade Center served as the headquarters of Cantor Fitzgerald. Prior to its dissolution, the headquarters of US Helicopter were in Lower Manhattan.

== Government and infrastructure ==
=== Subway ===
The headquarters of the Port Authority of New York and New Jersey is located in 4 World Trade Center of the World Trade Center complex.

The city hall and related government infrastructure of the City of New York are located in Lower Manhattan, next to City Hall Park. The Jacob K. Javits Federal Building is located in Civic Center. It includes the Federal Bureau of Investigation New York field office.

Many New York City Subway routes converge downtown. The largest hub, Fulton Center, was completed in 2014 after a $1.4 billion reconstruction project necessitated by the September 11, 2001, attacks, and involves six separate stations. This transit hub was expected to serve 300,000 daily riders as of late 2014. The World Trade Center Transportation Hub and PATH station opened in 2016. Ferry services are also concentrated downtown, including the Staten Island Ferry at the Whitehall Terminal, NYC Ferry at Pier 11/Wall Street (and Battery Park City Ferry Terminal starting in 2020), and service to Governors Island at the Battery Maritime Building.

=== Vehicles ===
Lower Manhattan is accessible by vehicle through several major thoroughfares. From New Jersey, Lower Manhattan is accessible through the Holland Tunnel from Interstate 78. From Queens, Long Island, and points east, it is accessible through the Queens–Midtown Tunnel from the Long Island Expressway. From Midtown and Upper Manhattan, it is accessible from the West Side Highway.

=== Bus ===
Many MTA express buses stop in lower Manhattan, the SIM1, SIM2, SIM4, SIM5, SIM7, SIM9, SIM15, SIM32, SIM33, SIM34, and SIM35 to Staten Island, the BM1, BM2, BM3, BM4, X27, and X28 to Brooklyn, the QM7, QM8, QM11, QM25, and QM65 to Queens, and the BxM18 to The Bronx.

== See also ==
- East Side
- Lower East Side
- Lower West Side
- Midtown Manhattan
- Upper Manhattan
- West Side
