= 170th Street station (IND Concourse Line) =

New York City Subway station in the Bronx

170 Street
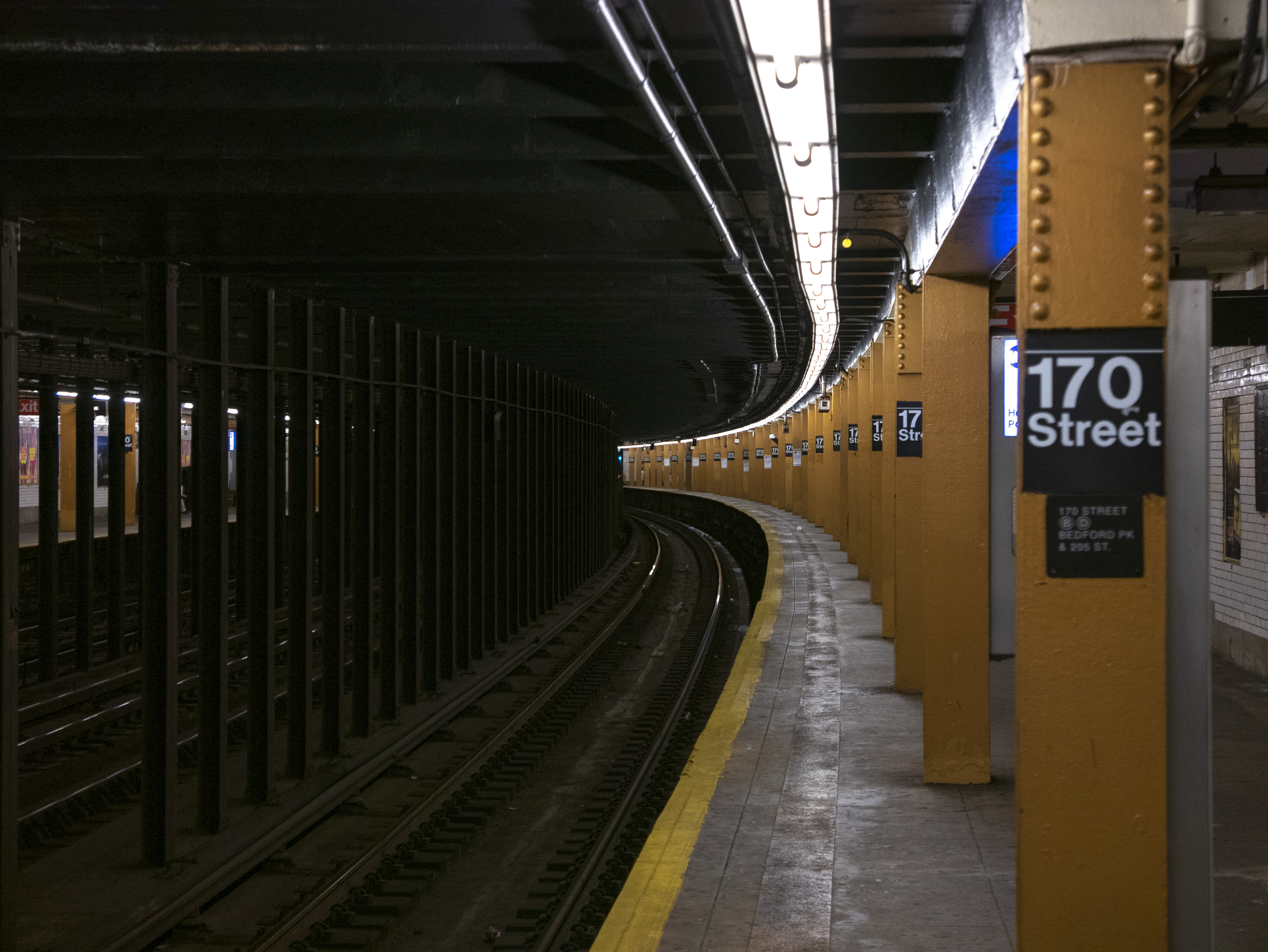
- Station curvature

Station statistics
- Address: East 170th Street & Grand Concourse; Bronx, New York
- Borough: The Bronx
- Locale: Highbridge, Tremont, Claremont
- Coordinates: 40.838814°N 73.913741°W
- Division: B (IND)
- Line: IND Concourse Line
- Services: B (weekdays only); D (all except rush hours, peak direction)
- Transit: NYCT Bus: Bx1, Bx2, Bx11, Bx18A/B; MTA Bus: BxM4
- Structure: Underground
- Platforms: 2 side platforms
- Tracks: 3

Other information
- Opened: July 1, 1933 (93 years ago)

Traffic
- 2025: 1,179,192 ▲17%
- Rank: 281 out of 423
Services
Preceding station	New York City Subway	Following station
174th–175th Streets B D toward Norwood–205th Street	D (New York City Subway service)	167th Street B D toward Coney Island–Stillwell Avenue
Location
Location within New York City Subway
Location within New York City
Location within New York
Track layout
Street map
Station service legend
Symbol	Description
Stops all times except rush hours in the peak direction	Stops all times except rush hours in the peak direction
Stops rush hours only	Stops rush hours only
Stops weekdays during the day	Stops weekdays during the day

The 170th Street station is a local station on the IND Concourse Line of the New York City Subway, located at the Grand Concourse between East 170th and 171st Streets in the Highbridge, Tremont and Claremont neighborhoods of the Bronx. It is served by the D train at all times except rush hours in the peak direction and the B train weekdays only. The station opened in 1933, along with the rest of the Concourse Line.

== History ==
This station was built as part of the IND Concourse Line, which was one of the original lines of the city-owned Independent Subway System (IND). The route of the Concourse Line was approved to Bedford Park Boulevard on June 12, 1925, by the New York City Board of Transportation. Construction of the line began in July 1928. The station opened on July 1, 1933, along with the rest of the Concourse subway.

== Station layout ==
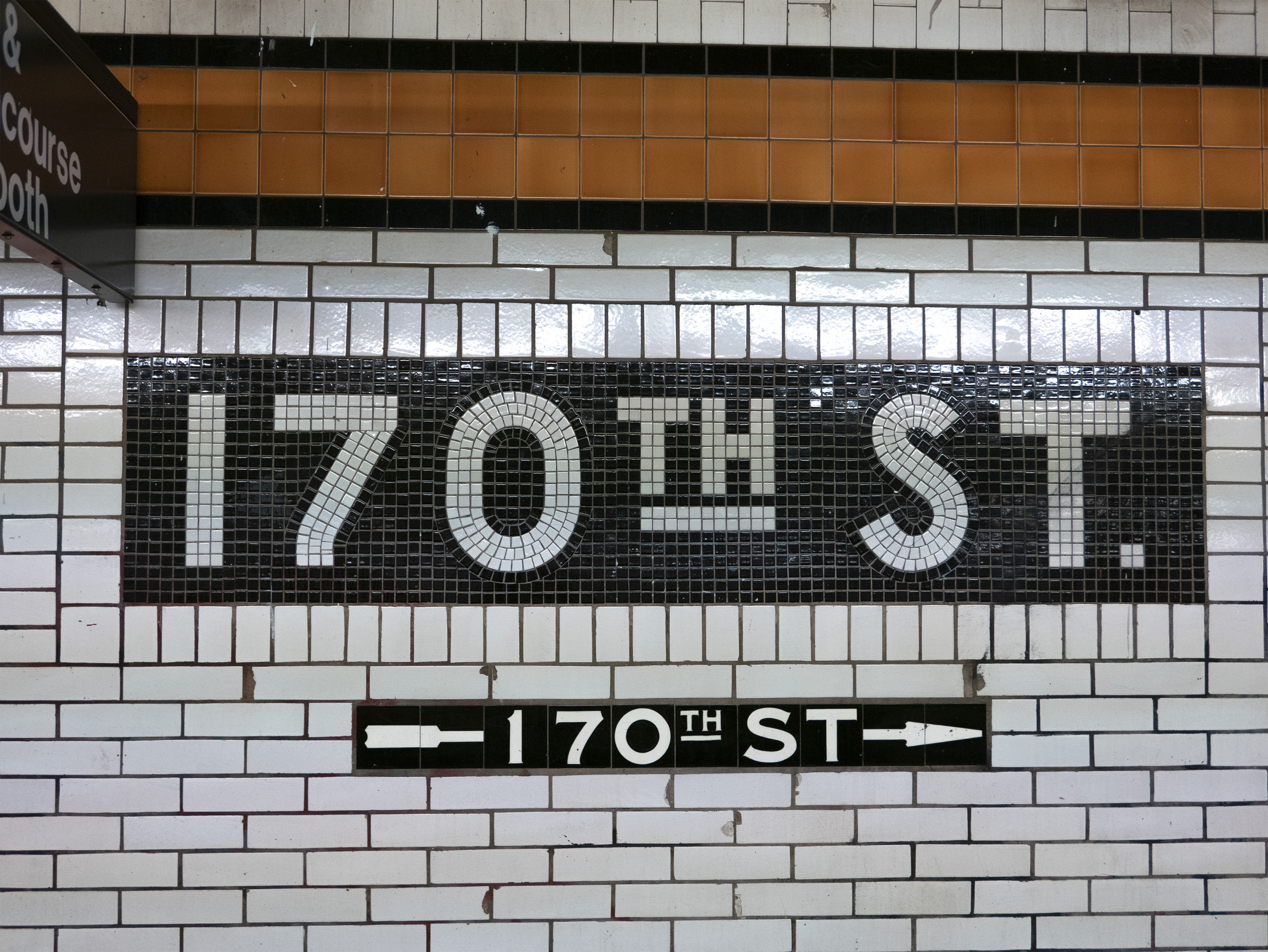
Name tablet mosaic

This underground station has three tracks and two side platforms. The center express track is used by the D train during rush hours in the peak direction.

Both platforms have an orange trim line on a black border and name tablets reading "170TH ST." in white sans-serif lettering on a black background. Small "170" and directional tile captions in white lettering on a black background run below the trim line and name tablets. Orange-yellow I-beam columns run along both platforms and the full-time mezzanine at regular intervals with alternating ones having the standard black station name plate with white lettering.

South of this station, a fourth track to the west of the line begins at a bumper block. It merges with the southbound local track just before approaching 167th Street and is used for train storage.

=== Exits ===
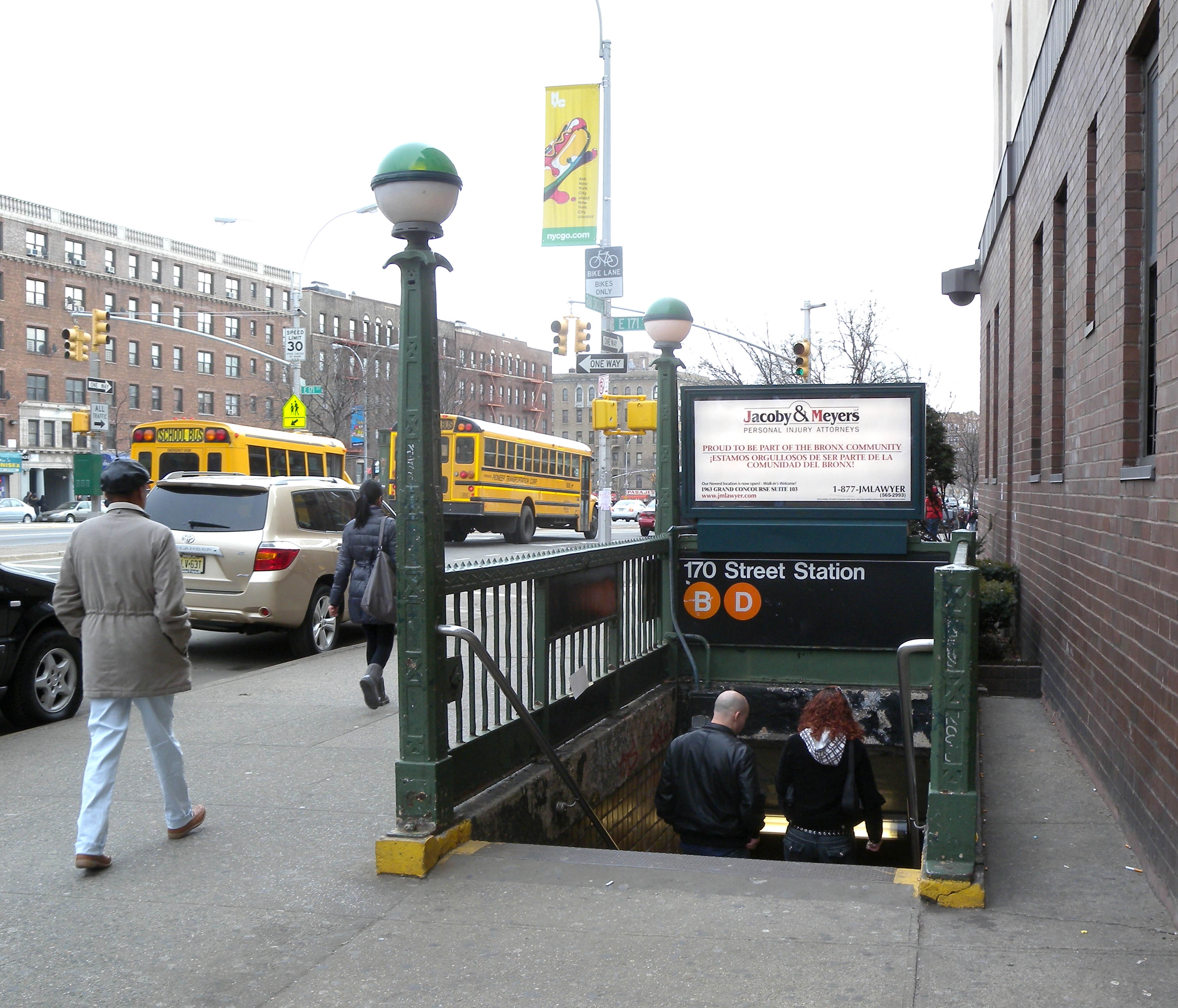
Entrance on the east side of Grand Concourse

The full-time mezzanine is at the north end of the station. Two staircases from each platform go up to a waiting area/crossover, where a turnstile bank provides access to and from the station. Outside fare control, there is a token booth and two staircases going up to either northern corners of East 171st Street and Grand Concourse.

Each platform has a same-level un-staffed fare control area at their south ends. On the Manhattan-bound side, a set of regular and High Entry/Exit Turnstiles lead to a mezzanine area, where two staircases go up to either western corners of East 170th Street and Grand Concourse. The fare control area on the Norwood-bound side is exit only, containing two high turnstiles and one staircase going up to the southwest corner of East 170th Street and Grand Concourse.

Below this station is a tunnel carrying East 170th Street underneath the Grand Concourse. On both sides of the platforms at the southern end, there were staircases that led down to the East 170th Street underpass; they were closed off to the public for security reasons in 1992.
