= Fordham Road station (IND Concourse Line) =

New York City Subway station in the Bronx

Fordham Road
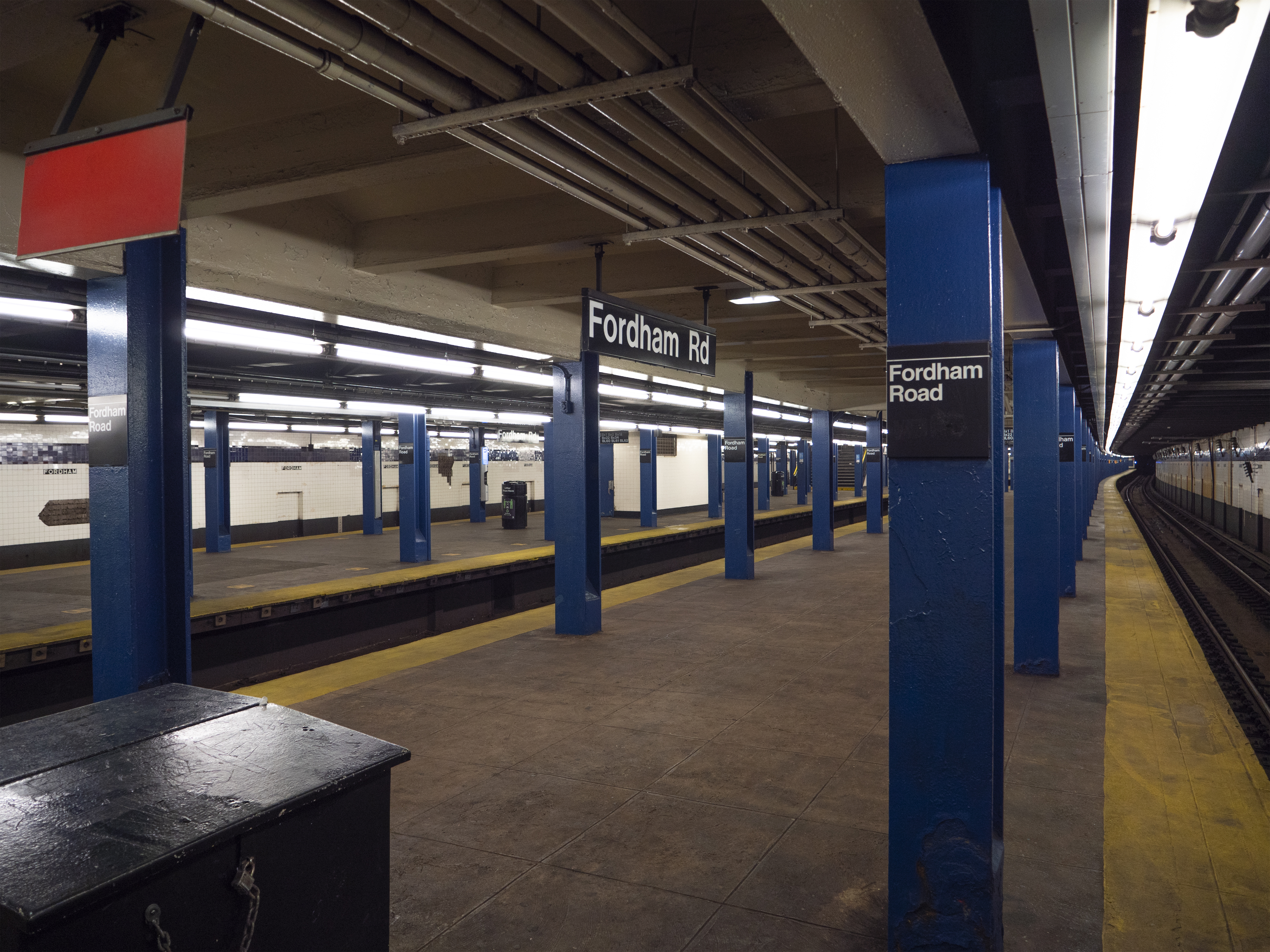
- View from the northbound platform

Station statistics
- Address: East Fordham Road & Grand Concourse; Bronx, New York
- Borough: The Bronx
- Locale: Fordham Heights
- Coordinates: 40.862414°N 73.897133°W
- Division: B (IND)
- Line: IND Concourse Line
- Services: B (weekdays only); D (all times)
- Transit: NYCT Bus: Bx1, Bx2, Bx12, Bx12 SBS, Bx22, Bx34; MTA Bus: BxM4; Bee-Line Bus: 62
- Structure: Underground
- Platforms: 2 island platforms cross-platform interchange
- Tracks: 3

Other information
- Opened: July 1, 1933; 93 years ago
- Accessible: No; planned

Traffic
- 2025: 1,881,811 ▲11%
- Rank: 186 out of 423
Services
Preceding station	New York City Subway	Following station
Kingsbridge Road B D toward Norwood–205th Street	D (New York City Subway service)	Tremont Avenue D express
Kingsbridge Road B D toward Norwood–205th Street	D (New York City Subway service)	182nd–183rd Streets B D toward Coney Island–Stillwell Avenue
Location
Location within New York City Subway
Location within New York City
Location within New York
Track layout
Street map
Station service legend
Symbol	Description
Stops all times except rush hours in the peak direction	Stops all times except rush hours in the peak direction
Stops all times	Stops all times
Stops rush hours only	Stops rush hours only
Stops weekdays during the day	Stops weekdays during the day

The Fordham Road station is an express station on the IND Concourse Line of the New York City Subway. Located at the intersection of Fordham Road and Grand Concourse in one of the largest shopping districts in New York City, it is served by the D train at all times and the B train weekdays only.

== History ==
This station was built as part of the IND Concourse Line, which was one of the original lines of the city-owned Independent Subway System (IND). The route of the Concourse Line was approved to Bedford Park Boulevard on June 12, 1925 by the New York City Board of Transportation. Construction of the line began in July 1928. The station opened on July 1, 1933, along with the rest of the Concourse subway.

In 1981, the Metropolitan Transportation Authority (MTA) listed the Fordham Road station among the 69 most deteriorated stations in the subway system. In July 2025, the MTA announced that it would install elevators at 12 stations, including the Fordham Road station, as part of its 2025–2029 Capital Program. The elevators would make the station fully compliant with the Americans with Disabilities Act of 1990. In October 2026, the MTA announced plans to install taller fare gates with glass panels at 20 additional stations, including the Fordham Road station, following a successful pilot program at earlier stations.

== Station layout ==
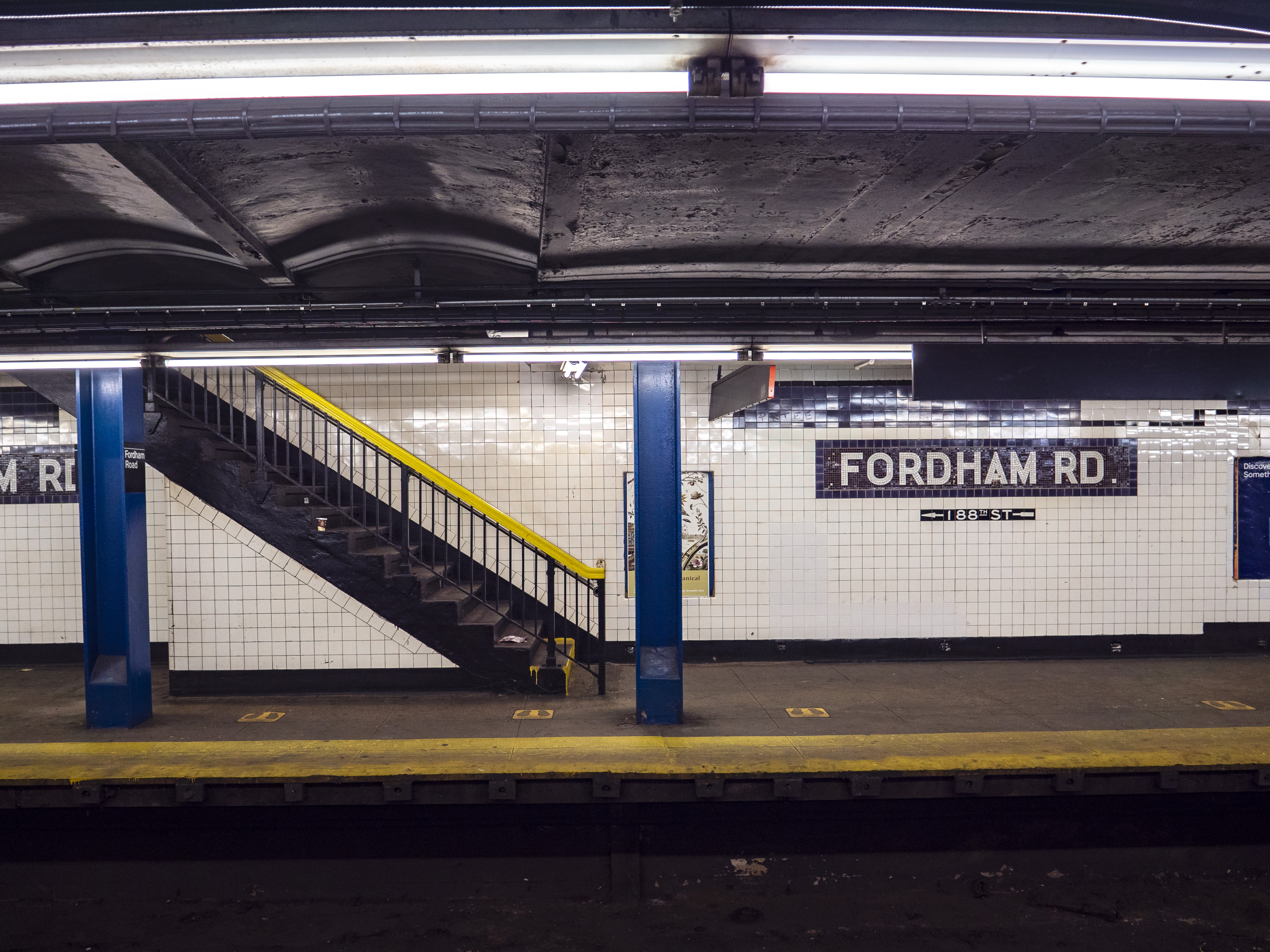
A mosaic and staircase up on the Manhattan-express portion of the southbound platform

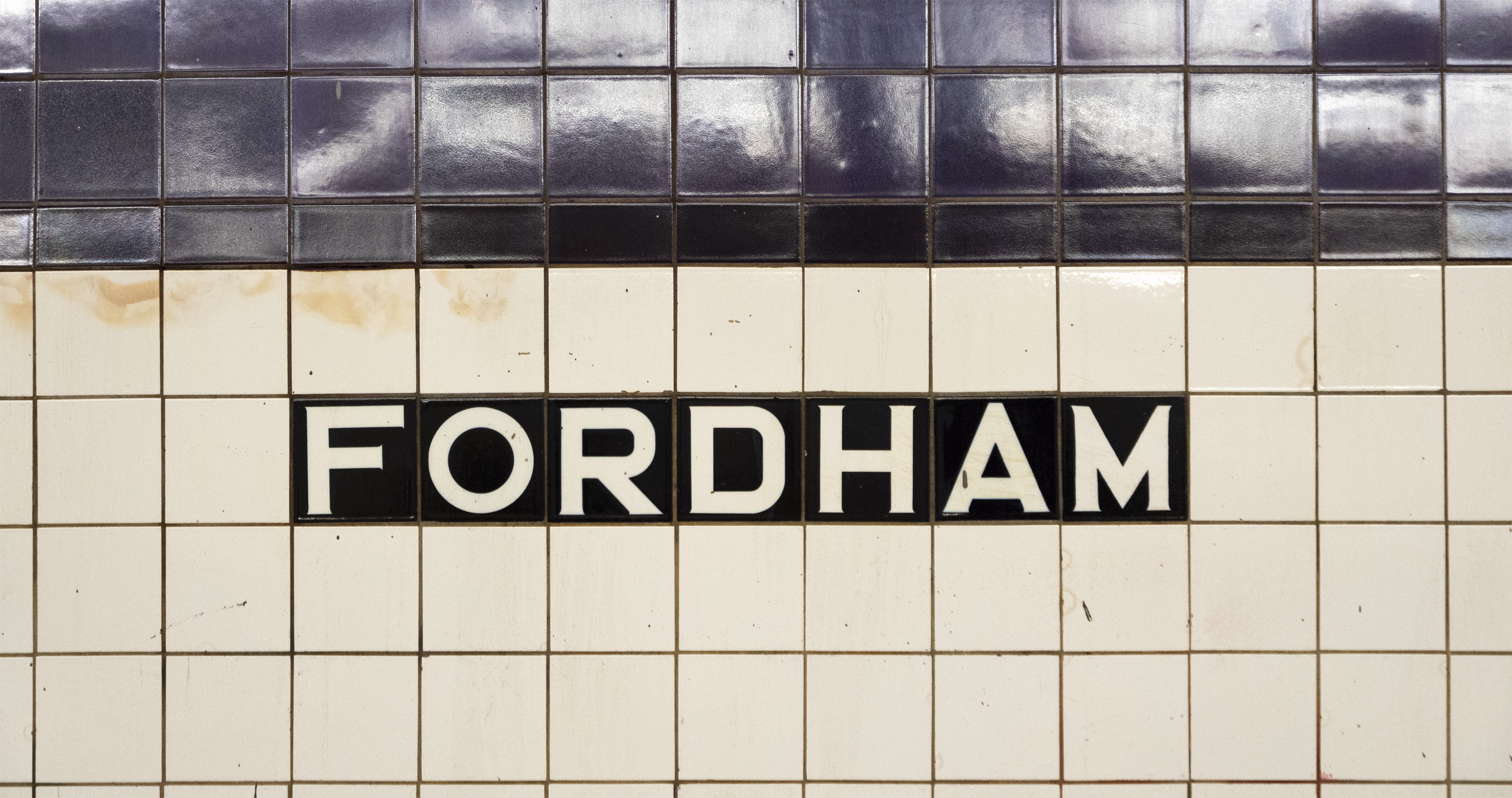
Tile caption below trim line

Fordham Road has more space than any other station on the Concourse Line, as it contains numerous closed stairs and passageways. The southbound island platform widens at the north end of the station to facilitate a wall that splits it half, creating two "side" platforms. The northbound island platform is like others found throughout the system. During construction of the station, the main road of Grand Concourse was diverted into an underpass below Fordham Road, while the subway tracks were placed underneath either service road; the space in between the split southbound platform is likely where the underpass dips below grade-level. The split portion of the southbound platform once had a passageway from the northernmost staircase at the Fordham Road side from the middle track to the local one. Due to security concerns, it was permanently cordoned off by a wall and employee-only door as early as April 1998.

Between the north and south fare control areas is a small passageway on the eastern side of the station, half of which is outside the paid area and fenced off. The Fordham Road entrance is not accessible from the "local" side of the southbound platform; during off-peak hours, passengers must walk to the center of the platform for all downtown service. There is a Rapid Transit Operations Field Office at the south end of the full-time mezzanine, a result of the shortening of the mezzanine and elimination of two platform stairs for each side. Both platforms have six stairs to mezzanine level. The northbound one also has two closed stairs while the southbound has four, two on both the local and express sides.

The trim line is Concord Grape with Black Grape borders and on the walls of the southbound platform are mosaic name tablets reading "FORDHAM RD." in white sans-serif lettering on a Black Grape background and Concord Grape border. Prussian blue I-beam columns run along the platforms at regular intervals, alternating ones having the standard black station name plate with white lettering. A closed tower sits at the south end of the southbound platform.

=== Exits ===
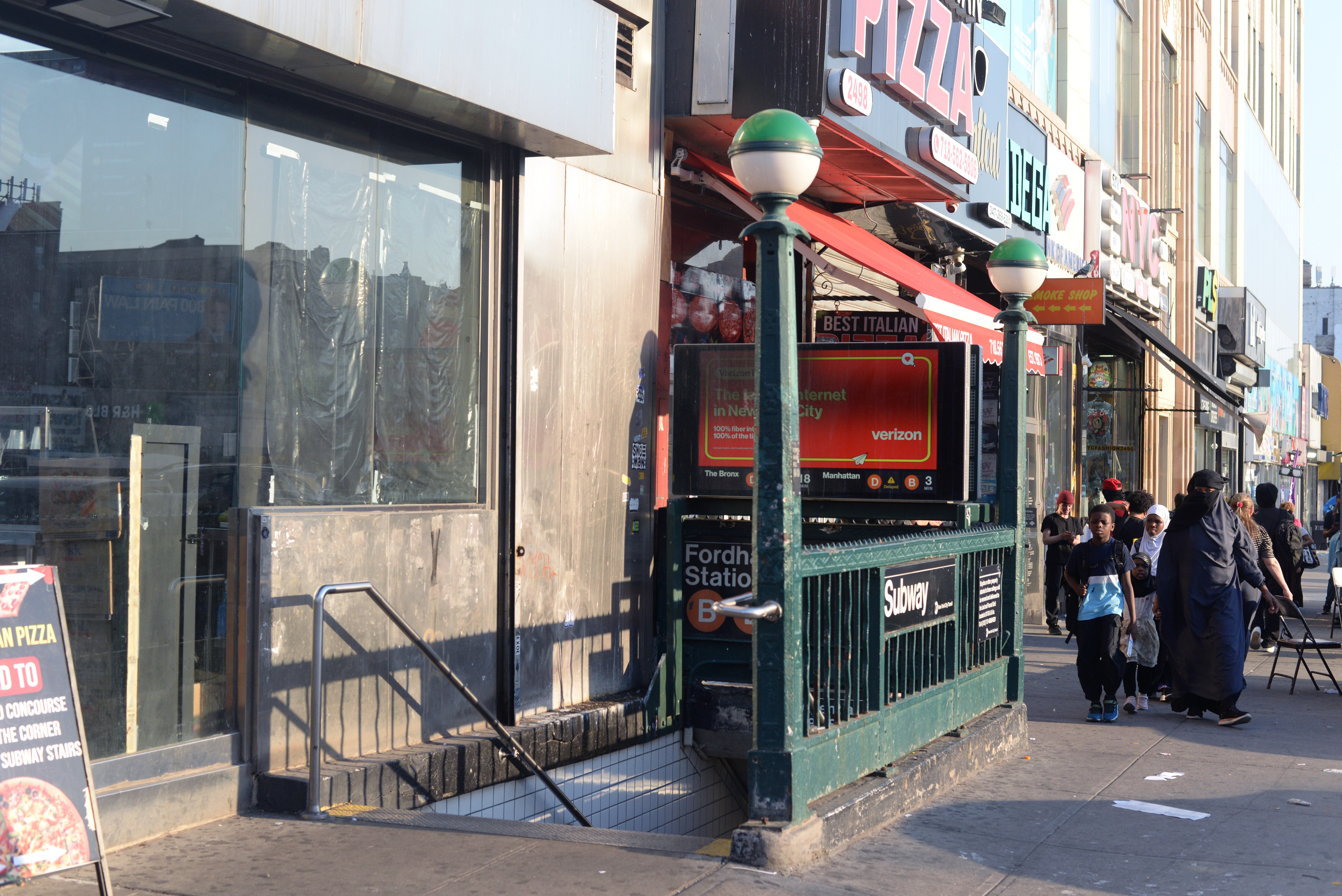
The southeastern street stair at Fordham Road, across from the former Alexander's store.

The main fare control area, with the station's full-time token booth, is located at the middle of the station at East 188th Street. It has four street stairs, one for each corner of the intersection with Grand Concourse. Unusually, the two western staircases go down several steps to a short landing area, before rising to street level.

The smaller fare control at Fordham Road has only HEET turnstiles, and Emergency Exit gates which have had their alarms deactivated due to frequent use by exiting passengers. It has two street stairs, both at the east side of Fordham and Concourse; a long ramping passageway leads to the northernmost of these two staircases. This was formerly a part-time entrance. The token booth at this location had been closed temporarily in the 1970s. It was permanently closed in August 2003 and is no longer present.

There were two additional exits and a passageway on the west side of Fordham Road and Grand Concourse. They were nearest to the former location of Alexander's and Caldor. Today, the building houses a mix of smaller stores. In 1989, the MTA proposed closing off the free zone passageway on the west side and convert the northwestern and southwestern entrances to exit only; formerly, they were only open from 6 a.m. to 9 p.m. This was done for safety reasons because the corridor was considered a crime haven. Despite the former proposal, the passageway remained open until April 1991, when the western areas were closed off to the public or operated reduced hours on an interim basis, and the stairs were also slabbed over on street level; the free zone passageway on the east side was also gated off. In 1993, riders wanted the western entrances reopened as they would have been safer and more convenient for shoppers going to the Fordham stores. The MTA did not reverse the decision because the western passageway was problematic before its closure and very few passengers used the exits.

== Location ==
The station lies within the Fordham Road Business Improvement District, the third largest shopping district in the city stretching from Third and Webster Avenues west to Jerome Avenue. The northwest corner of Fordham Road and Grand Concourse was the location of a large Alexander's department store (2 Fordham Square) from 1933 to 1992, and is currently anchored by P. C. Richard & Son and Marshalls. This is the closest station to Fordham Plaza (the eastern end of the shopping district), and the Rose Hill campus of Fordham University.
