= 161st Street–Yankee Stadium station =

New York City Subway station in the Bronx

161 Street–Yankee Stadium
- New York City Subway station complex
- An arriving and departing pair of R142/A 4 trains at 161st Street-Yankee Stadium

Station statistics
- Address: East 161st Street & River Avenue; Bronx, New York
- Borough: The Bronx
- Locale: Highbridge, Concourse
- Coordinates: 40.827937°N 73.925886°W
- Division: A (IRT), B (IND)
- Line: IRT Jerome Avenue Line; IND Concourse Line
- Services: 4 (all times); B (weekdays only); D (all except rush hours, peak direction)
- Transit: NYCT Bus: Bx6, Bx6 SBS, Bx13; Metro-North: Hudson Line (at Yankees–East 153rd Street)
- Levels: 2

Other information
- Accessible: Yes

Traffic
- 2025: 6,186,747 ▲4.2%
- Rank: 43 out of 423
Location
Location within New York City Subway
Location within New York City
Location within New York
Street map
Station service legend
Symbol	Description
Stops all times except rush hours in the peak direction	Stops all times except rush hours in the peak direction
Stops all times	Stops all times
Stops rush hours only	Stops rush hours only
Stops weekdays during the day	Stops weekdays during the day

The 161st Street–Yankee Stadium station is a New York City Subway station complex shared by the elevated IRT Jerome Avenue Line and the underground IND Concourse Line. It is located at the intersection of 161st Street and River Avenue in the Highbridge and Concourse neighborhoods of the Bronx. It is generally served by the 4 train at all times; the D train at all times except rush hours in the peak direction (unless there is an event at Yankee Stadium); and the B train during weekday rush hours and middays.

The combined passenger count for 161st Street–Yankee Stadium station in 2019 was 8,254,928, making it the busiest station in the Bronx and 49th busiest overall. This station is one of only two station complexes in the Bronx (the other being 149th Street–Hostos). There is also a New York City Police Department (NYPD) transit precinct at the station.

== History ==
=== Construction and opening ===
==== IRT Jerome Avenue Line ====
The Dual Contracts, which were signed on March 19, 1913, were contracts for the construction and/or rehabilitation and operation of rapid transit lines in the City of New York. The contracts were "dual" in that they were signed between the City and two separate private companies (the Interborough Rapid Transit Company and the Brooklyn Rapid Transit Company), all working together to make the construction of the Dual Contracts possible. The Dual Contracts promised the construction of several lines in the Bronx. As part of Contract 3, the IRT agreed to build an elevated line along Jerome Avenue in the Bronx.

161st Street station opened as part of the initial section of the line to Kingsbridge Road on June 2, 1917. Service was initially operated as a shuttle between Kingsbridge Road and 149th Street.

On July 1, 1918, trains on the Ninth Avenue El began stopping here, as they were extended from 155th Street, entering the Bronx via the Putnam Bridge, a now-demolished swing bridge immediately north of the Macombs Dam Bridge, to connect with the Jerome Avenue line between 161st Street and 167th Street.

Through service to the IRT Lexington Avenue Line began on July 17, 1918. The line was completed with a final extension to Woodlawn on April 15, 1918. This section was initially served by shuttle service, with passengers transferring at this station. The construction of the line encouraged development along Jerome Avenue, and led to the growth of the surrounding communities. The city government took over the IRT's operations on June 12, 1940.

==== IND Concourse Line ====
The IND Concourse Line, also referred to as the Bronx−Concourse Line, was one of the original lines of the city-owned Independent Subway System (IND). The line running from Bedford Park Boulevard to the IND Eighth Avenue Line in Manhattan was approved by the New York City Board of Transportation on March 10, 1925, with the connection between the two lines approved on March 24, 1927. The line was originally intended to be four tracks, rather than three tracks, to Bedford Park Boulevard.

Construction of the line began in July 1928. The building of the line and proposed extensions to central and eastern Bronx (see below) led to real estate booms in the area. The entire Concourse Line, including 161st Street—River Avenue station, opened on July 1, 1933, less than ten months after the IND's first line, the IND Eighth Avenue Line, opened for service. Initial service was provided by the C train, at that time an express train, between 205th Street, then via the Eighth Avenue Line, Cranberry Street Tunnel and the IND South Brooklyn Line (now Culver Line) to Bergen Street. The CC provided local service between Bedford Park Boulevard and Hudson Terminal (now World Trade Center).

On December 15, 1940, with the opening of the IND Sixth Avenue Line, the D train began serving the IND Concourse Line along with the C and CC. It made express stops in peak during rush hours and Saturdays and local stops at all other times. C express service was discontinued in 1949–51, but the C designation was reinstated in 1985 when double letters used to indicate local service was discontinued. During this time, the D made local stops along the Concourse Line at all times except rush hours, when the C ran local to Bedford Park Boulevard. On March 1, 1998, the B train replaced the C as the rush-hour local on the Concourse Line, with the C moving to the Washington Heights portion of the Eighth Avenue Line.

When the IND portion was built in 1933, paper tickets were used to transfer between the two lines; this method was used until the 1950s, when the indoor escalators were built.

=== Station renovations ===
Elevators at the station were installed in the early 2000s as part of a three-year renovation of the station complex and opened in late 2002, making the station the fourth in the Bronx to be fully ADA-compliant.

The MTA announced in late 2022 that it would open customer service centers at 15 stations; the centers would provide services such as travel information and OMNY farecards. The first six customer service centers, including one at the 161st Street–Yankee Stadium station, were to open in early 2023. The 161st Street–Yankee Stadium station's customer service center opened in February 2023. In October 2026, the MTA announced plans to install taller fare gates with glass panels at 20 additional stations, including the 161st Street–Yankee Stadium station, following a successful pilot program at earlier stations.

== Station layout ==
The station complex is ADA-accessible, with elevators available to all platforms. The station contains the headquarters of the New York City Police Department (NYPD)'s Transit District 11.

This station is located adjacent to Yankee Stadium, and also provides service to many Bronx County courts, government facilities, and shopping districts in Concourse Village, which are a short walk to the east. The station is three blocks away from the Yankees–East 153rd Street station, a Metro-North Railroad stop on the Hudson Line, which provides service to Yankee Stadium from Manhattan and the Lower Hudson Valley up to Poughkeepsie. Additional service is provided to this station in the form of shuttles from Grand Central, as well as select trains on the Harlem and New Haven lines on game days.

The 2002 artwork here is called Wall-Slide by Vito Acconci, which consists of sections of the station walls "sliding" out of place, sometimes out of the station. Wall-Slide forms seating on the IND platforms, and also reveals a mosaic work, Room of Tranquility by Helene Brandt, on the IRT mezzanine.

== IRT Jerome Avenue Line platforms ==
161 Street–Yankee Stadium
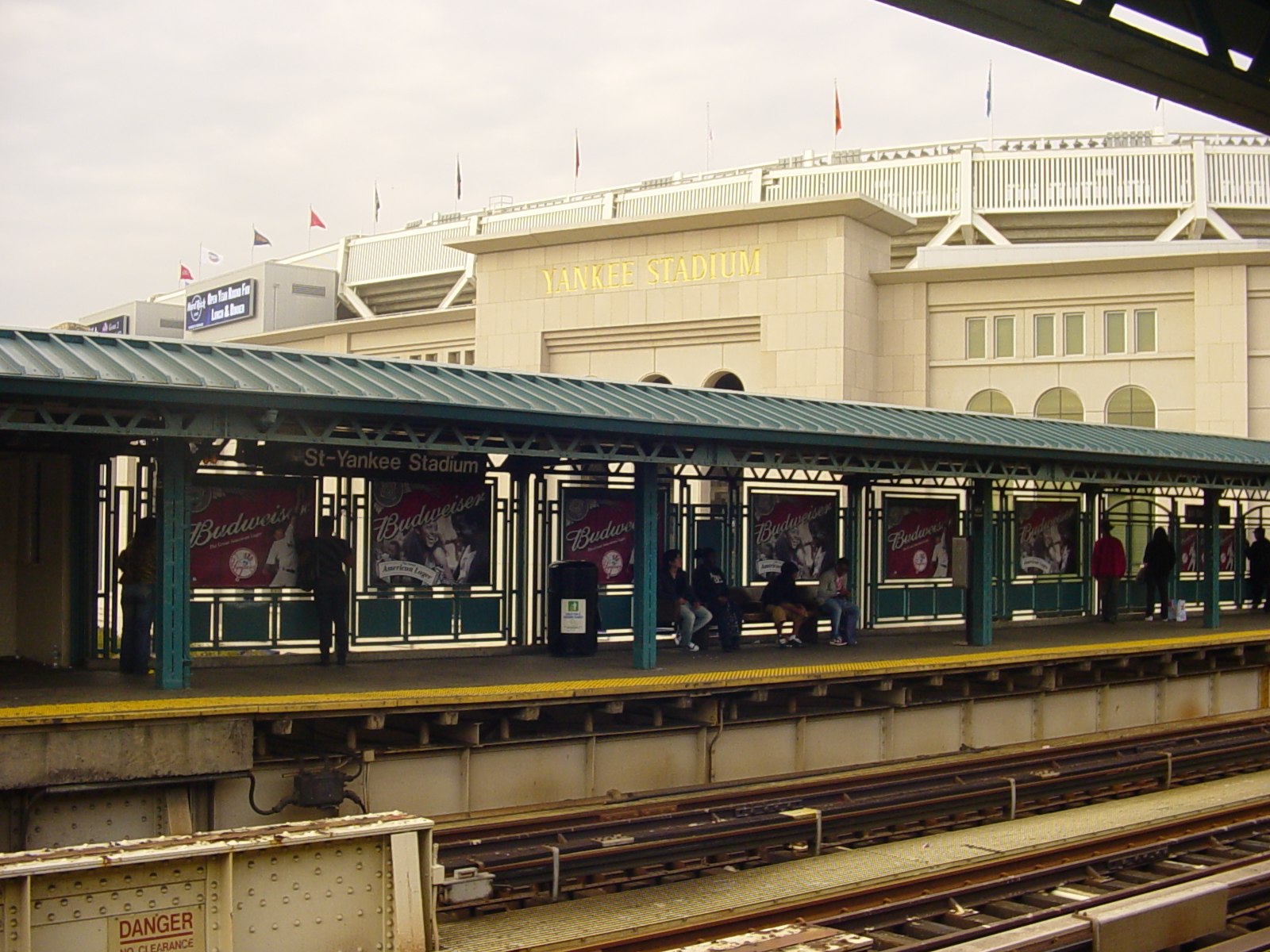
- View of southbound platform and Yankee Stadium

Station statistics
- Division: A (IRT)
- Line: IRT Jerome Avenue Line
- Services: 4 (all times)
- Structure: Elevated
- Platforms: 2 side platforms
- Tracks: 3 (2 in regular service)

Other information
- Opened: June 2, 1917 (109 years ago)
- Accessible: Yes
Services
Preceding station	New York City Subway	Following station
167th Street toward Woodlawn	4 (New York City Subway service)	149th Street–Hostos toward Crown Heights–Utica Avenue
Track layout
Station service legend
Symbol	Description
Stops all times	Stops all times

The 161st Street–Yankee Stadium station is a local station on the IRT Jerome Avenue Line that has three tracks and two side platforms. The 4 stops here at all times.

The station has extra exit stairs to handle stadium crowds at the southern end of each platform, which make the platforms at this station longer than traditional IRT platforms. These stairs lead to a separate mezzanine and fare control that were built to serve the old Yankee Stadium located across 161st Street; they continue to serve the new Yankee Stadium during events.

The former IRT Ninth Avenue Line connected with the IRT Jerome Avenue Line just north of this station, near 162nd Street. A stub of the Ninth Avenue Line connecting trackway still exists and is visible today.

=== Exits ===
On each side of River Avenue, there is one street stair to each of 161st Street's two medians. There are also two stairs to the southwest corner and one to the southeast corner. The northeast corner has an ADA-accessible elevator and transfer passageway.

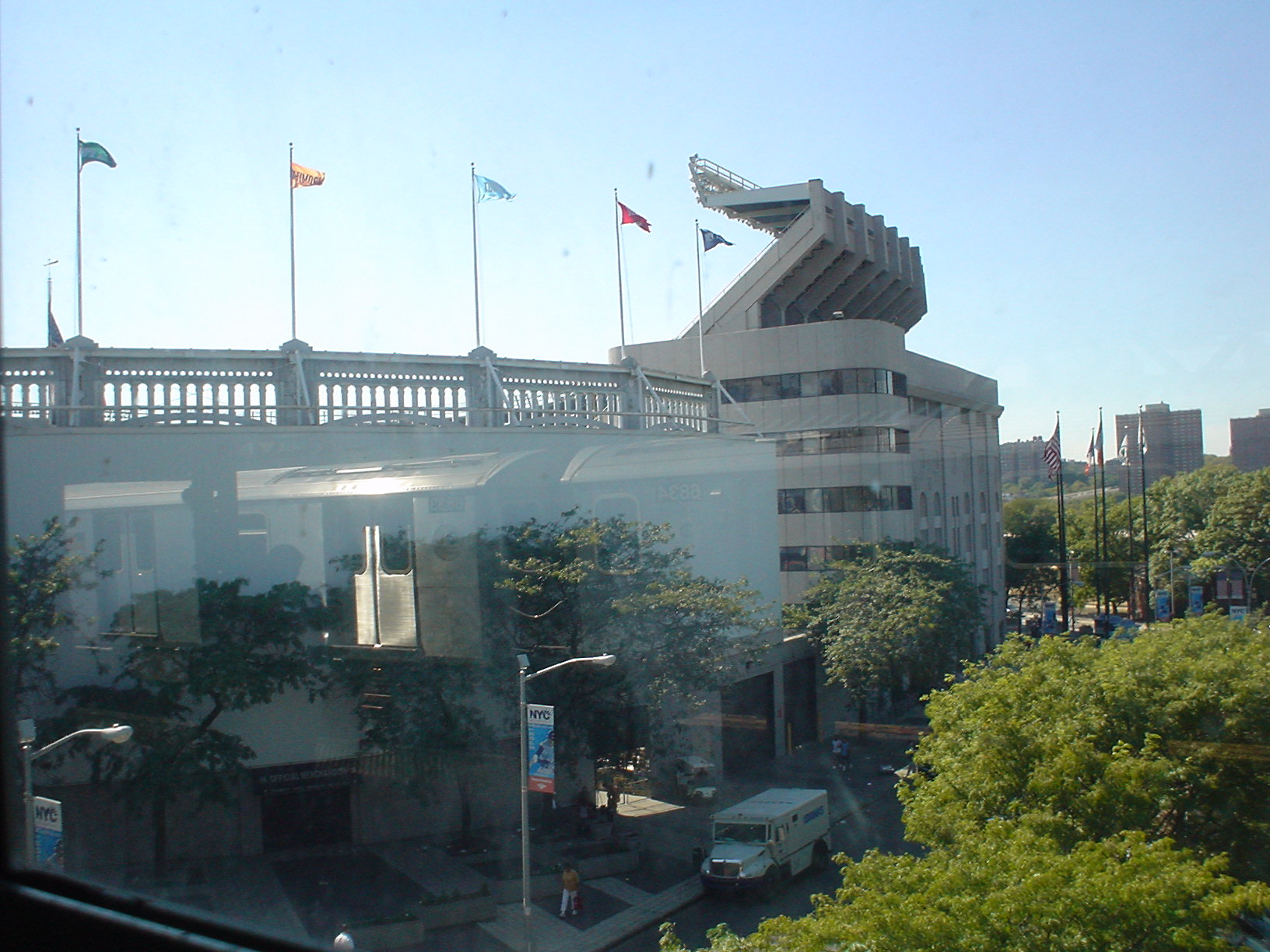
The view of the old Yankee Stadium from the IRT Jerome Line platform

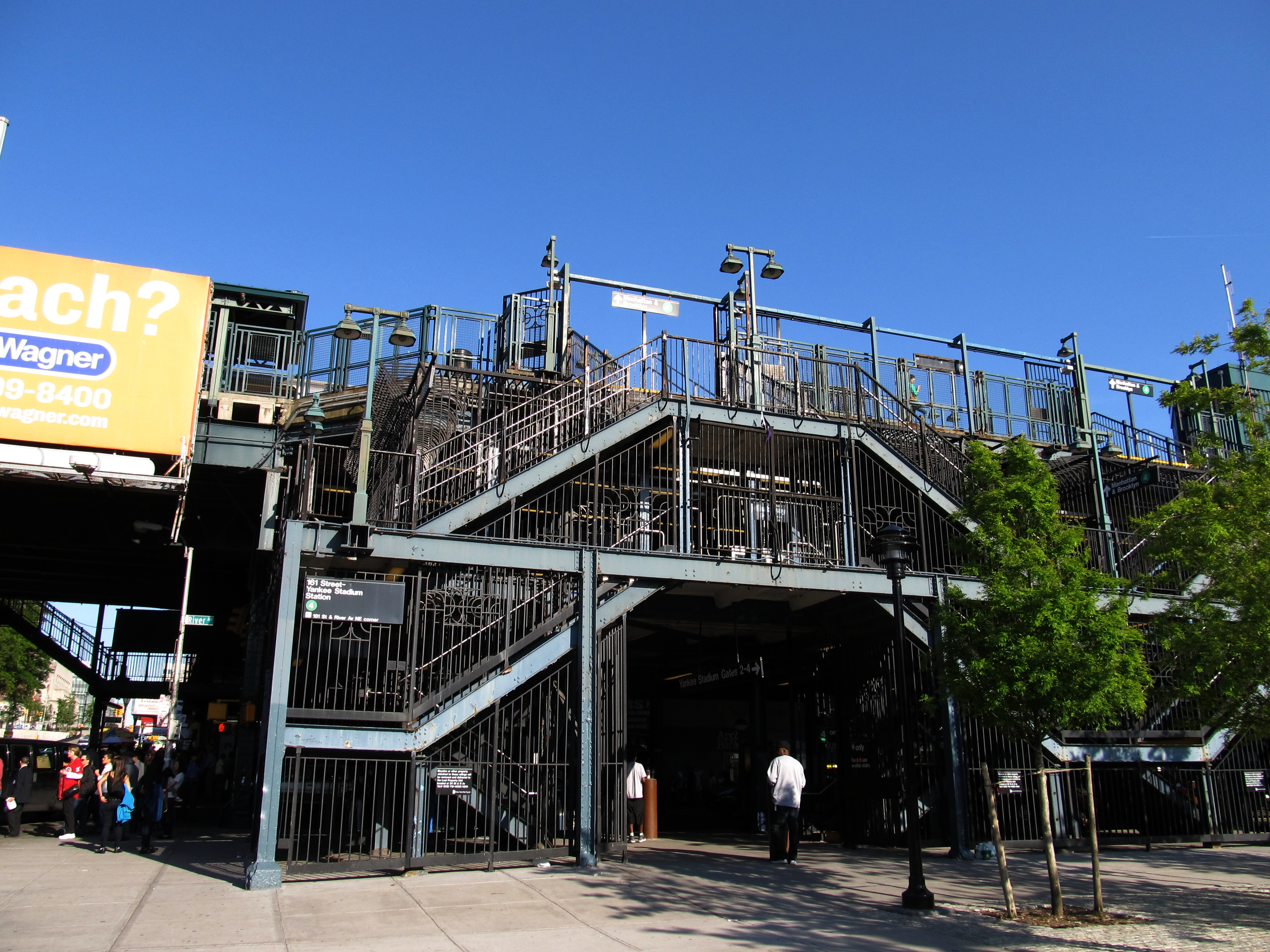
The IRT Jerome Line station as seen from the street

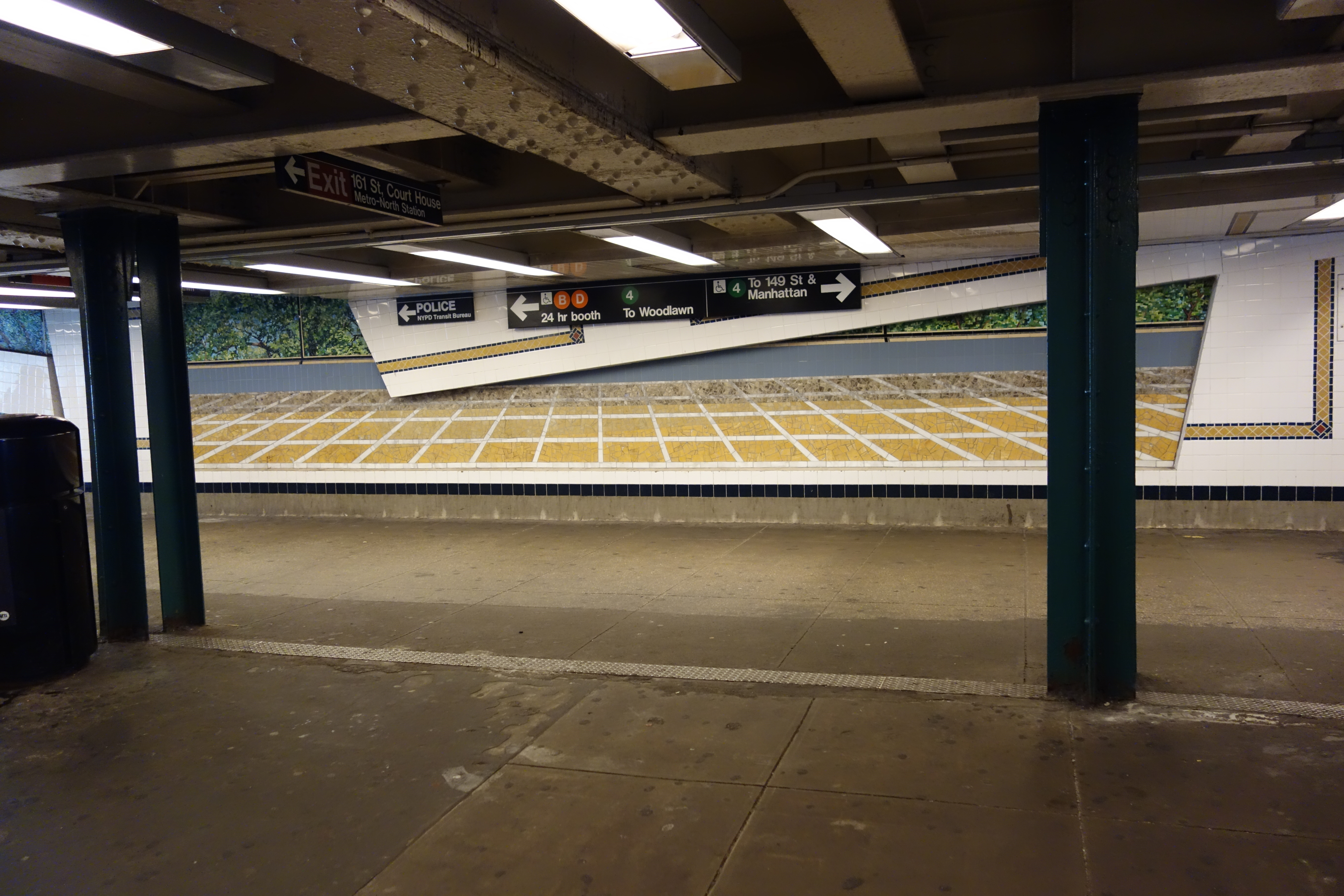
Wall-Slide and Room of Tranquility on the mezzanine

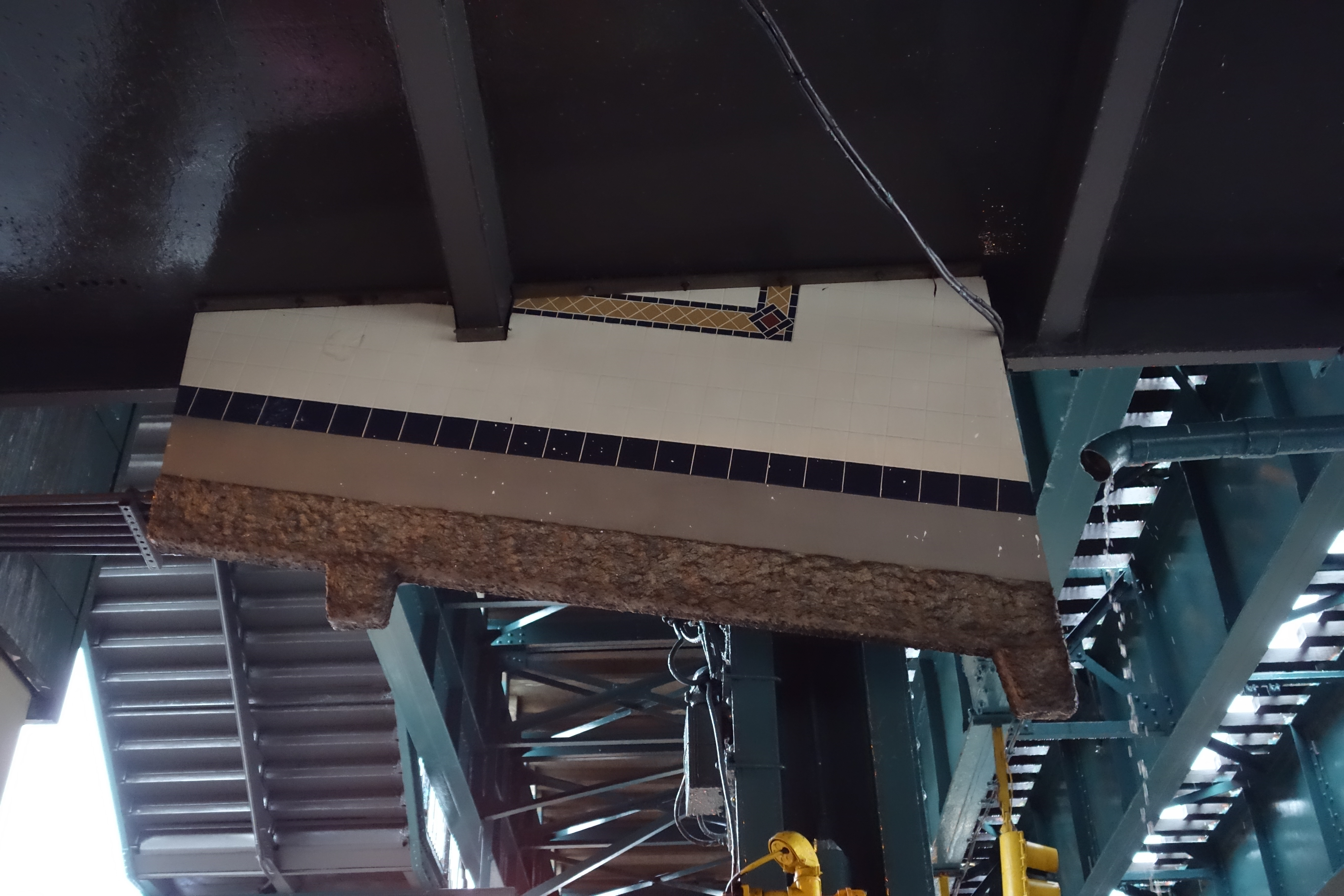
Wall-Slide detail beneath the mezzanine, over street level

== IND Concourse Line platforms ==
161 Street–Yankee Stadium
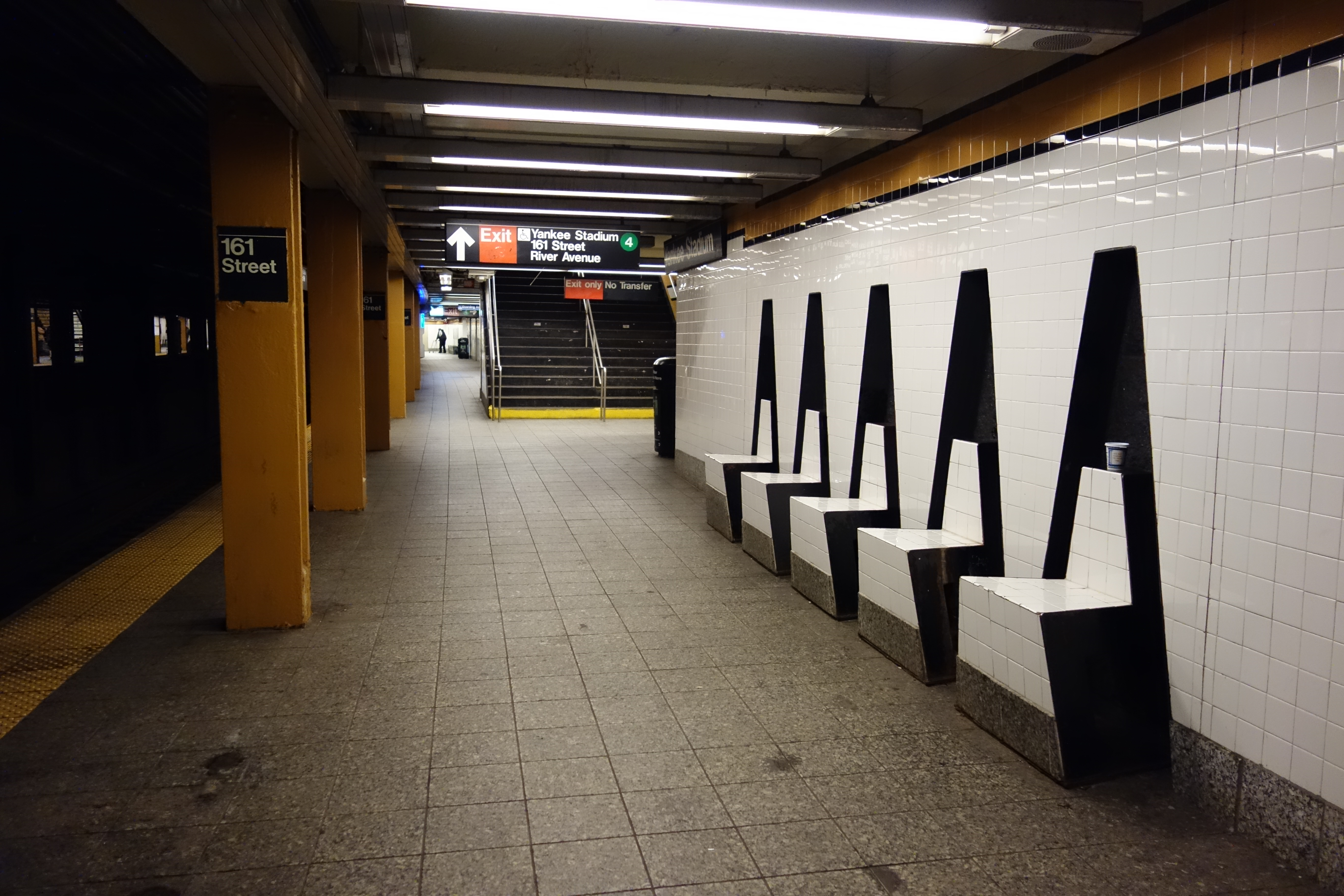
- Northbound platform with Wall-Slide seating

Station statistics
- Division: B (IND)
- Line: IND Concourse Line
- Services: B (weekdays only); D (all except rush hours, peak direction)
- Structure: Underground
- Platforms: 2 side platforms
- Tracks: 3

Other information
- Opened: July 1, 1933 (93 years ago)
- Accessible: Yes
- Former/other names: 161st Street–River Avenue
Services
Preceding station	New York City Subway	Following station
167th Street B D toward Norwood–205th Street	D (New York City Subway service)	155th Street B D toward Coney Island–Stillwell Avenue
Track layout
Station service legend
Symbol	Description
Stops all times except rush hours in the peak direction	Stops all times except rush hours in the peak direction
Stops rush hours only	Stops rush hours only
Stops weekdays during the day	Stops weekdays during the day

The 161st Street–Yankee Stadium station (161st Street–River Avenue on some signage) is a local station on the IND Concourse Line that has three tracks and two side platforms. It is the southernmost station on the IND Concourse Line within the Bronx.

=== Exits ===
The full-time mezzanine to the west is at 161st Street and River Avenue with four street staircases. The part-time entrance to the east is at Walton Avenue and has two street staircases and a passageway to 161st Street. Before the renovation, there was a full length mezzanine, with Transit Bureau Offices located to one side. After the renovation, the NYPD area was expanded, and public areas inside fare control were sealed, thus dividing the mezzanine into two separate areas. A few staircases to the platforms were also sealed and removed.

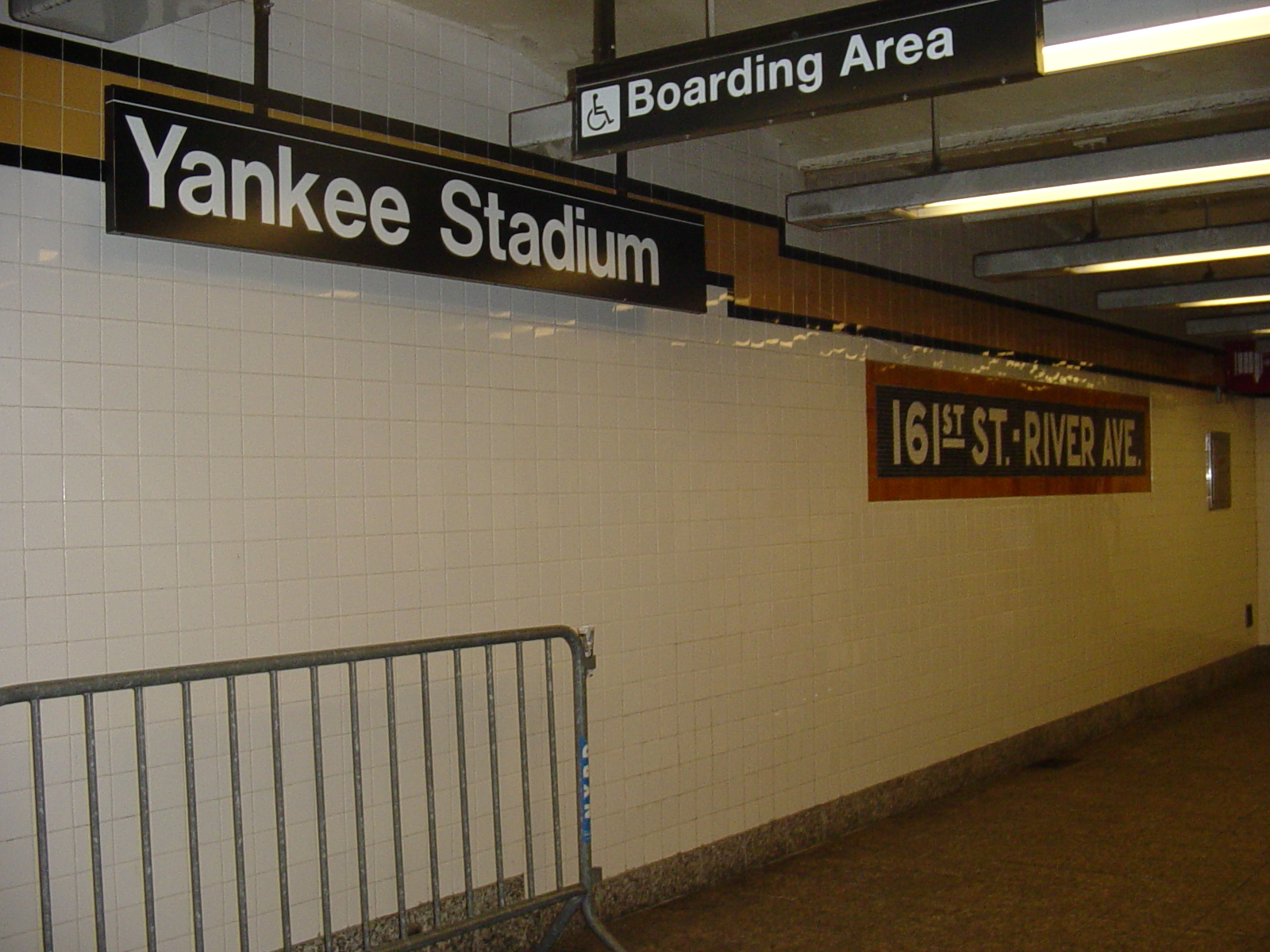
Modern sign next to an original-style mosaic

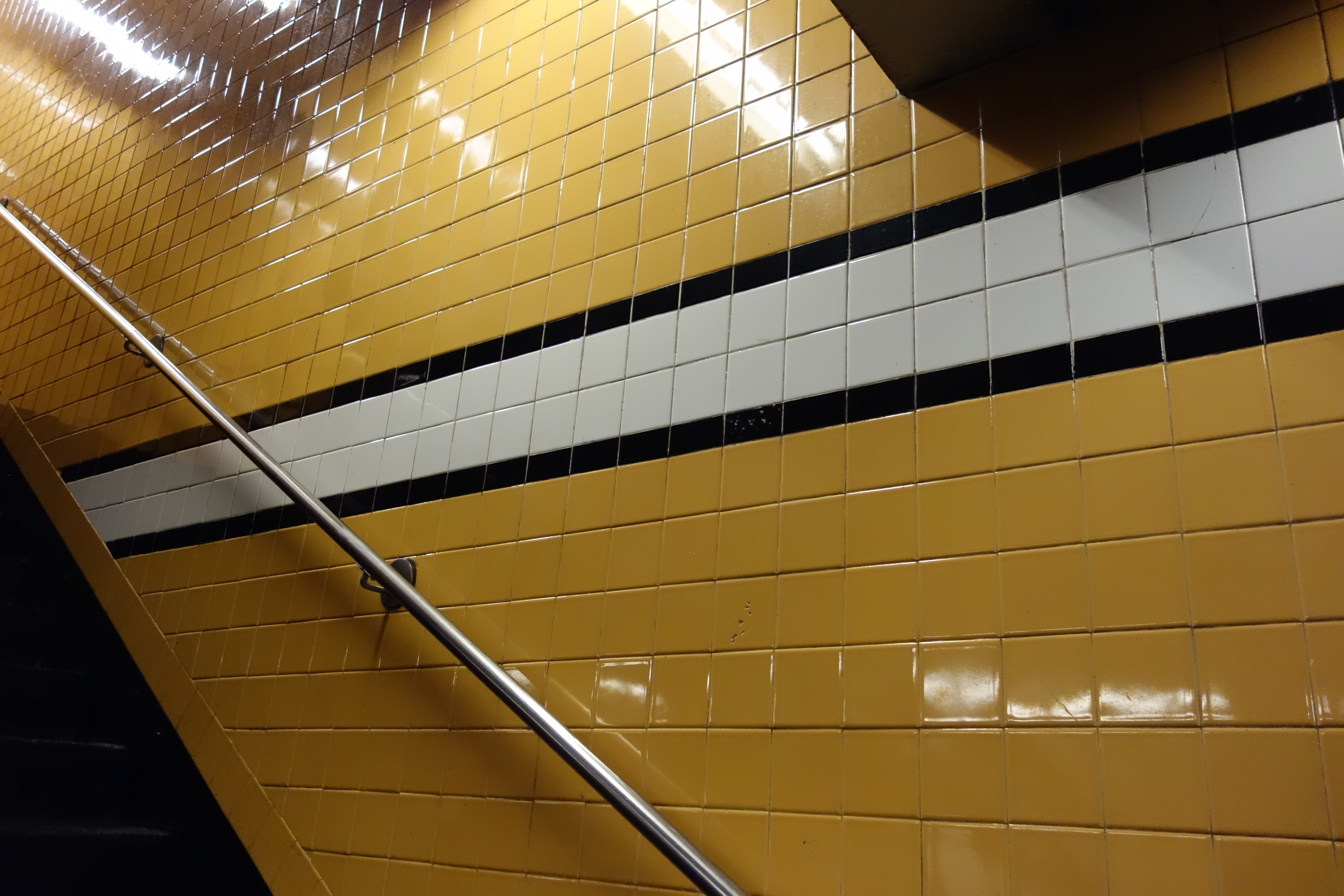
An inverted color scheme on the stairway walls

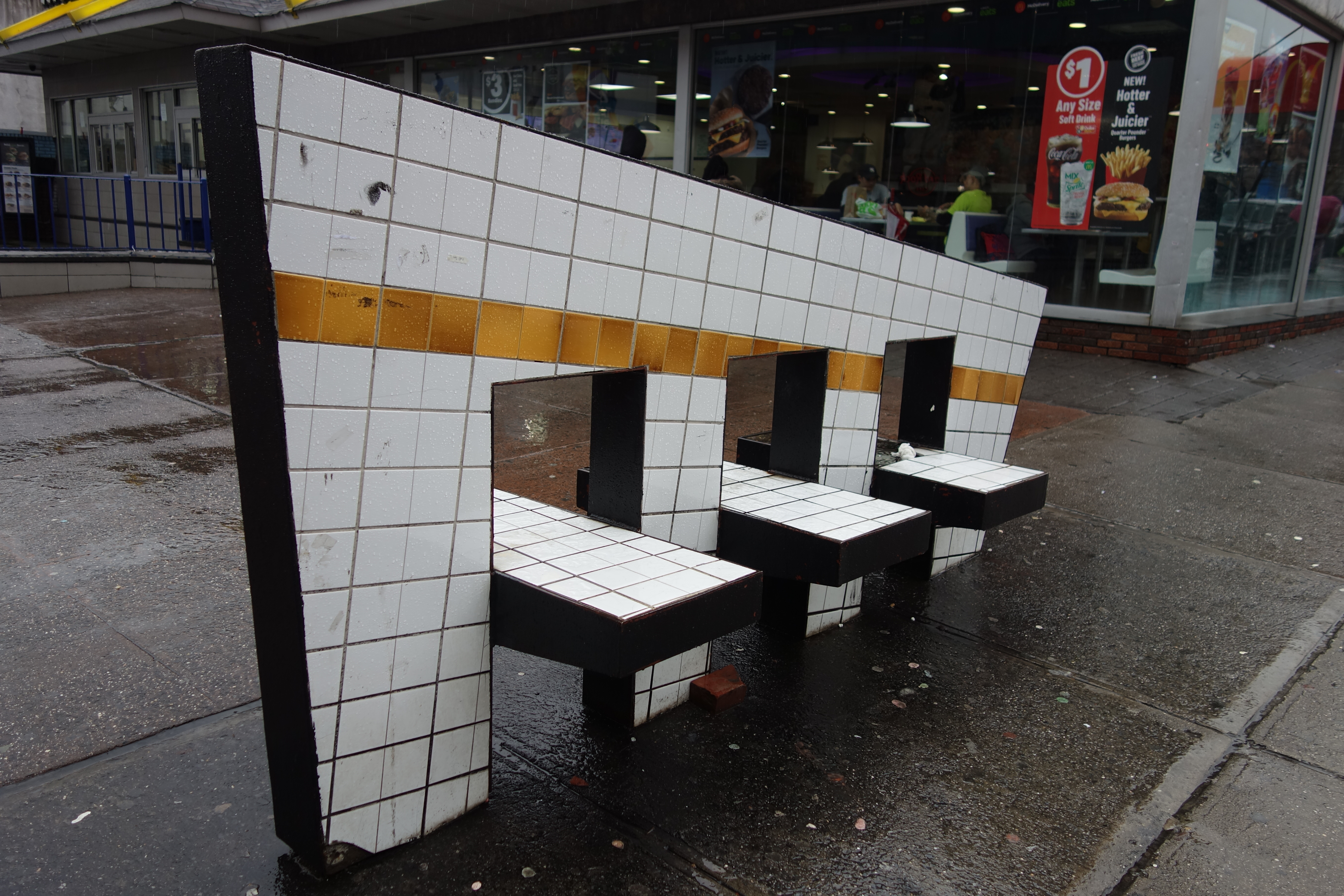
Wall-Slide detail at street level
