= Kingsbridge Road =

Kingsbridge Road may refer to:

- Kingsbridge Road (IRT Jerome Avenue Line), a New York City Subway station in the Bronx serving the 4 train
- Kingsbridge Road (IND Concourse Line), a New York City Subway station in the Bronx serving the B and D trains
- Kingsbridge Road railway station, a disused station in the English county of Devon
