= 174th–175th Streets station =

New York City Subway station in the Bronx

174–175 Streets
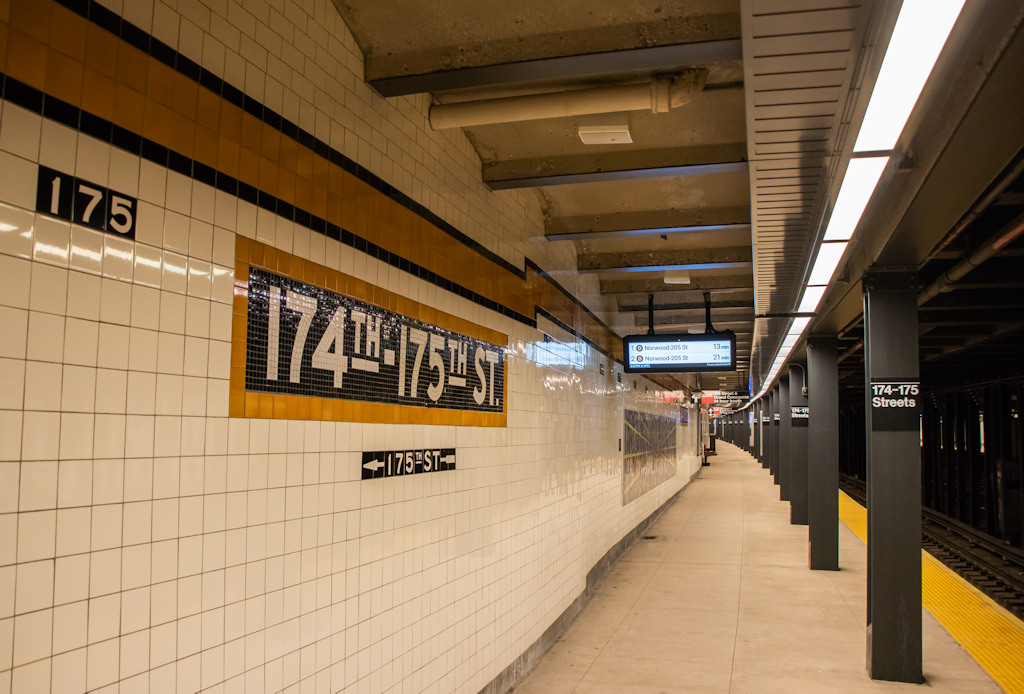
- Northbound station platform

Station statistics
- Address: Grand Concourse between East 174th Street & East 175th Street; Bronx, New York
- Borough: The Bronx
- Locale: Tremont, Mount Hope
- Coordinates: 40.845892°N 73.910179°W
- Division: B (IND)
- Line: IND Concourse Line
- Services: B (weekdays only); D (all except rush hours, peak direction)
- Transit: NYCT Bus: Bx1, Bx2, Bx32
- Structure: Underground (with enclosed elevated structure above 174th Street)
- Platforms: 2 side platforms
- Tracks: 3

Other information
- Opened: July 1, 1933 (93 years ago)
- Closed: August 13, 2018; 8 years ago (reconstruction)
- Rebuilt: December 26, 2018; 7 years ago

Traffic
- 2025: 935,790 ▲18.8%
- Rank: 324 out of 423
Services
Preceding station	New York City Subway	Following station
Tremont Avenue B D toward Norwood–205th Street	D (New York City Subway service)	170th Street B D toward Coney Island–Stillwell Avenue
Location
Location within New York City Subway
Location within New York City
Location within New York
Track layout
Street map
Station service legend
Symbol	Description
Stops all times except rush hours in the peak direction	Stops all times except rush hours in the peak direction
Stops rush hours only	Stops rush hours only
Stops weekdays during the day	Stops weekdays during the day

The 174th–175th Streets station is a local station on the IND Concourse Line of the New York City Subway, located at the Grand Concourse between East 174th and 175th Streets in the Bronx. It is served by the D train at all times except rush hours in the peak direction, and the B train weekdays only.

== History ==
This underground station, along with the rest of the Concourse Line, opened on July 1, 1933. Initial service was provided by the C express and CC local trains.

Under the 2015–2019 MTA Capital Plan, the station underwent a complete overhaul as part of the Enhanced Station Initiative, and was entirely closed for several months. Upgrades included cellular service, Wi-Fi, USB charging stations, interactive service advisories and maps. In January 2018, the NYCT and Bus Committee recommended that Citnalta-Forte receive the $125 million contract for the renovations of 167th and 174th–175th Streets on the IND Concourse Line and 145th Street on the IRT Lenox Avenue Line. However, the MTA Board temporarily deferred the vote for these packages after city representatives refused to vote to award the contracts. The contract was put back for a vote in February, where it was ultimately approved. The staircase entrance on the east side of Grand Concourse at the East 174th Street underpass closed on July 9, while the rest of the station closed for repairs on August 13. The station reopened on December 26, 2018.

== Station layout ==
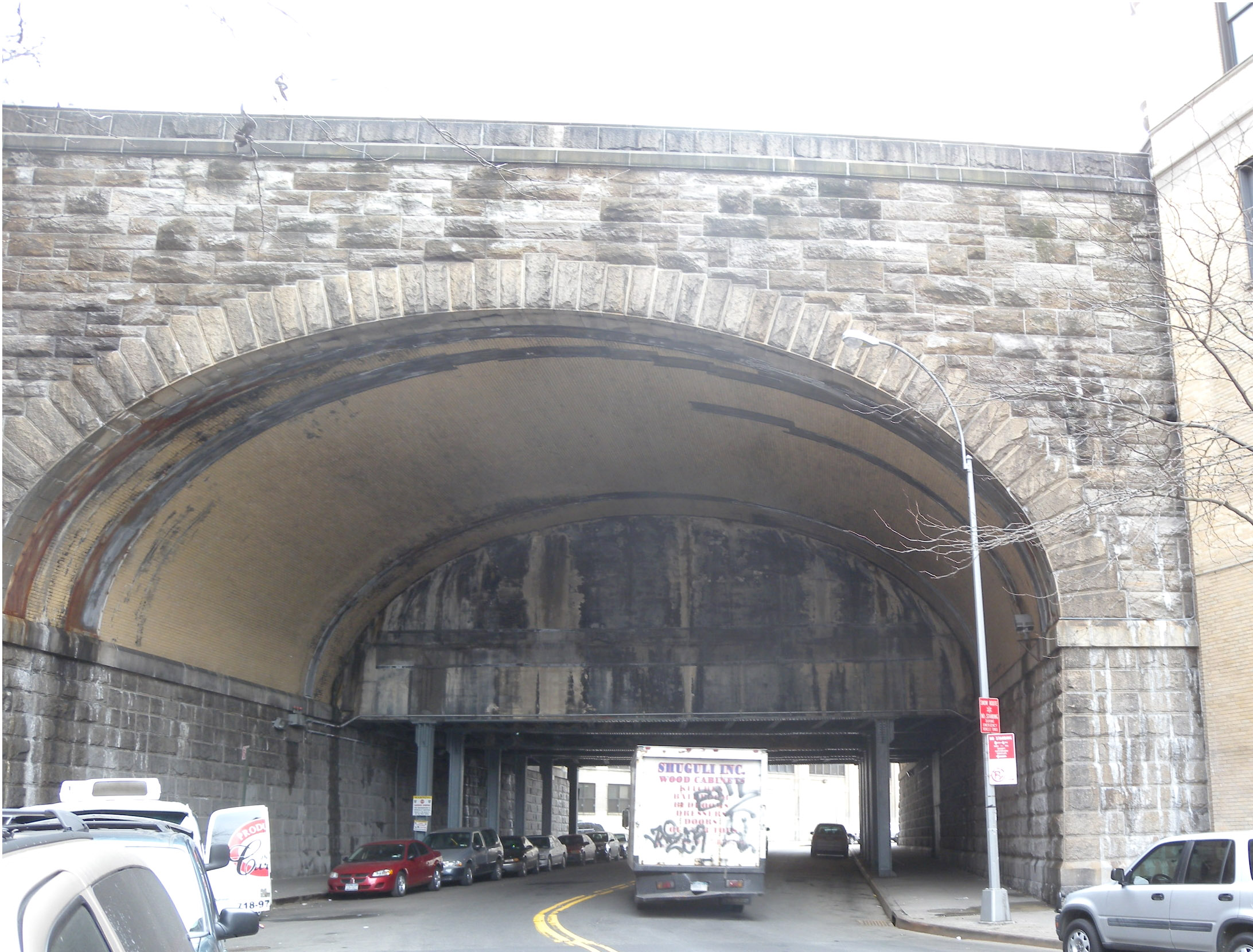
Passing over 175th Street

This underground station has three tracks and two side platforms. The center track is used by the D express train during rush hours in peak direction. Both platforms have an orange trim line with a black border and name tablets reading "174TH-175TH ST." in white sans-serif lettering on a black background and orange border. Under the trim line are small signs made of three tiles each reading "174" or "175" depending on location within the station. Grey (previously yellow) I-beam columns run along both platforms at regular intervals with alternating ones having the standard black station name plate in white lettering. The station is on a gently curving section of track, sharp enough to not be able to see the opposite end of the platform.

The 2018 artwork here is called Bronx Seasons Everchanging by Roy Secord. It features large abstract mosaics on the station walls inspired by the artist's own walking meditations through the Bronx's nature at different times of the year.

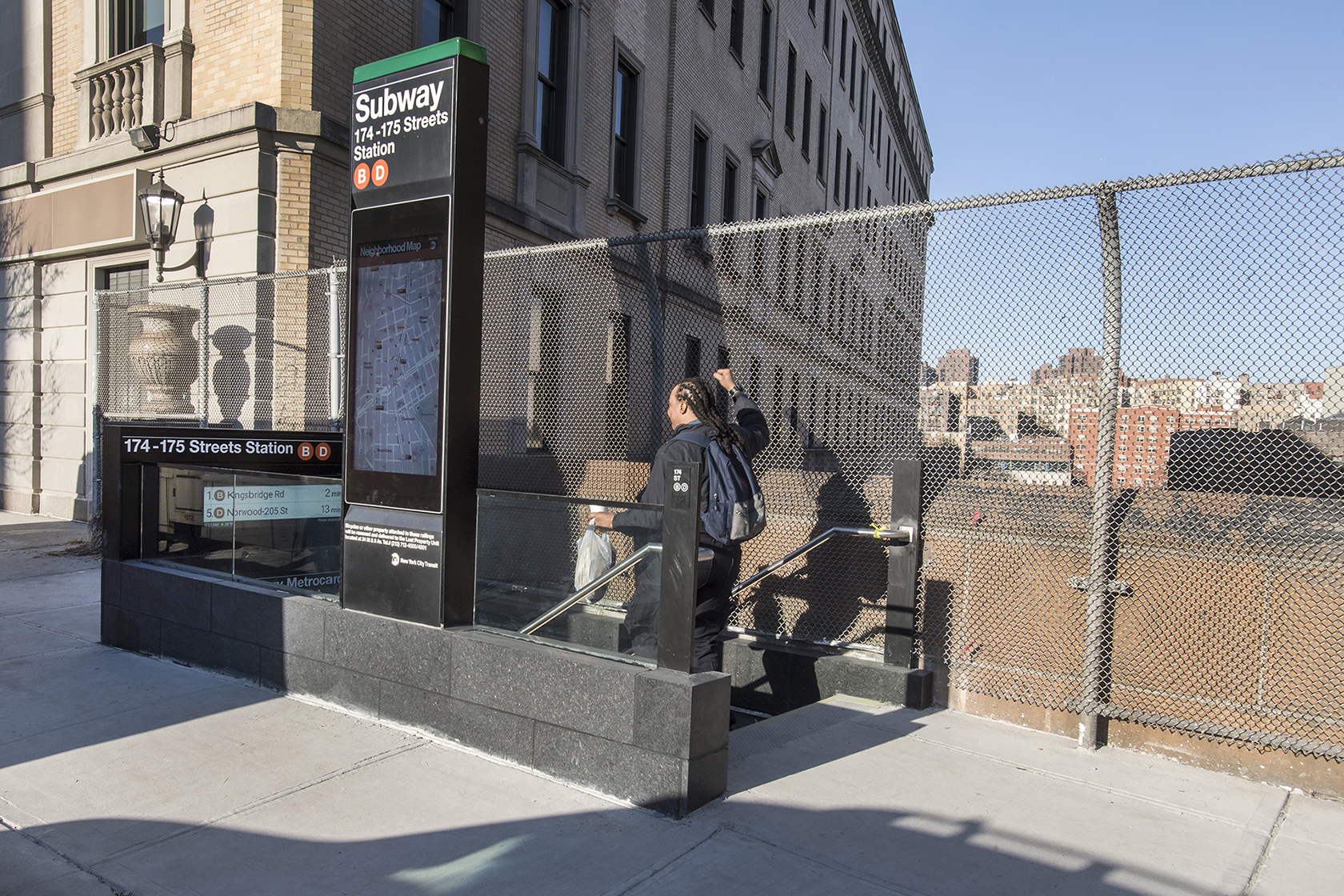
Station entrance

=== Exits ===
At this station, both the Grand Concourse and the underground Concourse Line pass over the Cross Bronx Expressway. The Concourse Line also passes over both 174th and 175th Streets, albeit within a totally enclosed tunnel that passes through a hillside with the Grand Concourse at its summit.

The south end fare control area is located at the south end of the station, one level below the tracks. A crossunder between directions is present here, as is an exit on the north side of 174th Street between Walton and Morris Avenues, directly beneath the Grand Concourse. Access to the Concourse itself is also located in this area and from the platforms, with one staircase leading to the east side on the Concourse. There was also an exit to the west side of the Grand Concourse and 174th Street from the south end fare control area and the platforms; this meandering passageway was closed off to the public and the staircase was also slabbed over on street level.

The north end fare control is located directly above 175th Street, which crosses beneath the Concourse, and has exits on both sides. There was also an exit to the south side of 175th Street, also directly beneath the Grand Concourse; it was gated off to the public. Prior to the station's renovation, stairways from the platform to this exit were gated off, but the fencing was replaced with a solid wall during the renovation.
