= 167th Street station (IND Concourse Line) =

New York City Subway station in the Bronx

167 Street
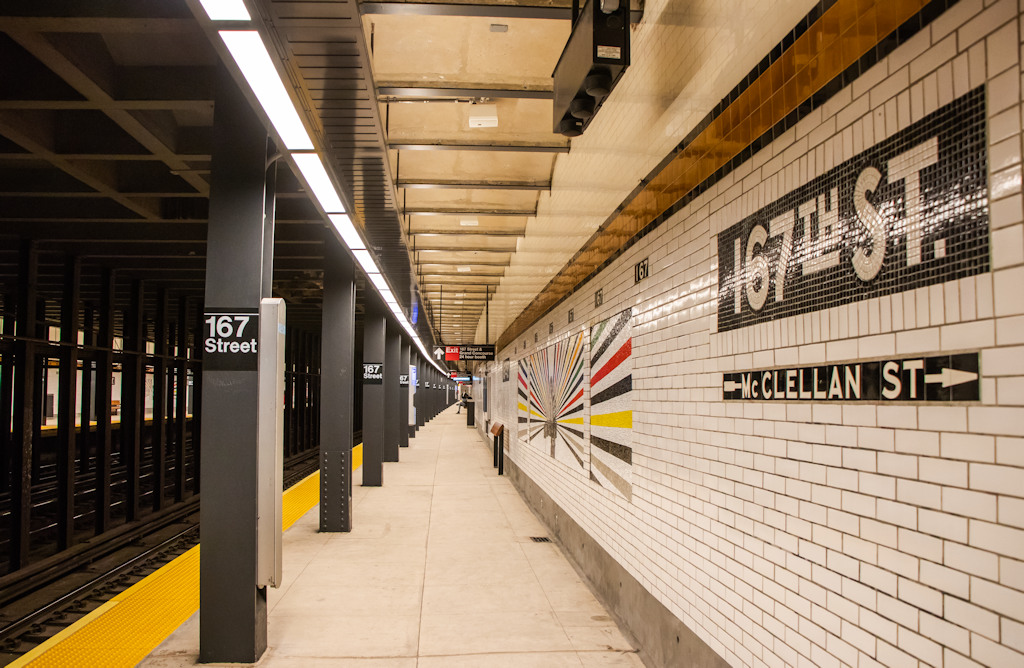
- Northbound station platform

Station statistics
- Address: East 167th Street and Grand Concourse; Bronx, New York
- Borough: The Bronx
- Locale: Highbridge, Concourse
- Coordinates: 40.8345°N 73.9177°W
- Division: B (IND)
- Line: IND Concourse Line
- Services: B (weekdays only); D (all except rush hours, peak direction)
- Transit: NYCT Bus: Bx1, Bx2, Bx35
- Structure: Underground
- Platforms: 2 side platforms
- Tracks: 3

Other information
- Opened: July 1, 1933 (93 years ago)
- Closed: August 27, 2018; 8 years ago (reconstruction)
- Rebuilt: January 9, 2019; 7 years ago
- Accessible: No; under construction

Traffic
- 2025: 1,710,945 ▲18.7%
- Rank: 208 out of 423
Services
| Preceding station | New York City Subway | Following station |
|---|---|---|
| 170th Street B D toward Norwood–205th Street | D (New York City Subway service) | 161st Street–Yankee Stadium B D toward Coney Island–Stillwell Avenue |
Location
Location within New York City Subway
Location within New York City
Location within New York
Track layout
Street map
Station service legend
| Symbol | Description |
| Stops all times except rush hours in the peak direction | Stops all times except rush hours in the peak direction |
| Stops rush hours only | Stops rush hours only |
| Stops weekdays during the day | Stops weekdays during the day |

The 167th Street station is a local station on the IND Concourse Line of the New York City Subway. Located at the intersection of 167th Street and Grand Concourse in the Highbridge and Concourse neighborhoods of the Bronx, it is served by the D train at all times except rush hours in peak direction and the B train weekdays only.

== History ==
This underground station, along with the rest of the Concourse Line, opened on July 1, 1933. Initial service was provided by the C express and CC local trains.

Under the 2015–2019 MTA Capital Plan, the station underwent a complete overhaul as part of the Enhanced Station Initiative, and was entirely closed for several months. Upgrades included cellular service, Wi-Fi, USB charging stations, interactive service advisories and maps. In January 2018, the NYCT and Bus Committee recommended that Citnalta-Forte receive the $125 million contract for the renovations of 167th and 174th–175th Streets on the IND Concourse Line and 145th Street on the IRT Lenox Avenue Line. However, the MTA Board temporarily deferred the vote for these packages after city representatives refused to vote to award the contracts. The contract was put back for a vote in February, where it was ultimately approved. The staircase entrance on the southwest corner of McClellan Street and Grand Concourse closed on July 9, while the rest of the station closed for repairs on August 27, and reopened on January 9, 2019. In 2019, the MTA announced that this station would become ADA-accessible as part of the agency's 2020–2024 Capital Program. In May 2024, the Federal Transit Administration awarded the MTA $157 million for accessibility renovations at five stations, including 167th Street. The funds would be used to add elevators, signs, and public-announcement systems, as well as repair platforms and stairs, at each station.

== Station layout ==
The station has three tracks and two side platforms. The center track is used by the D train during rush hours in the peak direction.

Both platforms have an orange trim line with a black border and name tablets reading "167TH ST." in white lettering on a black background with white border. Below the trim line and name tablets are small "167" and directional signs in white lettering on a black background. Grey (previously yellow) I-beam columns run along both platforms at regular intervals with alternating ones having the standard black station name plate in white lettering. A closed tower sits at the far north end of the Manhattan-bound platform.

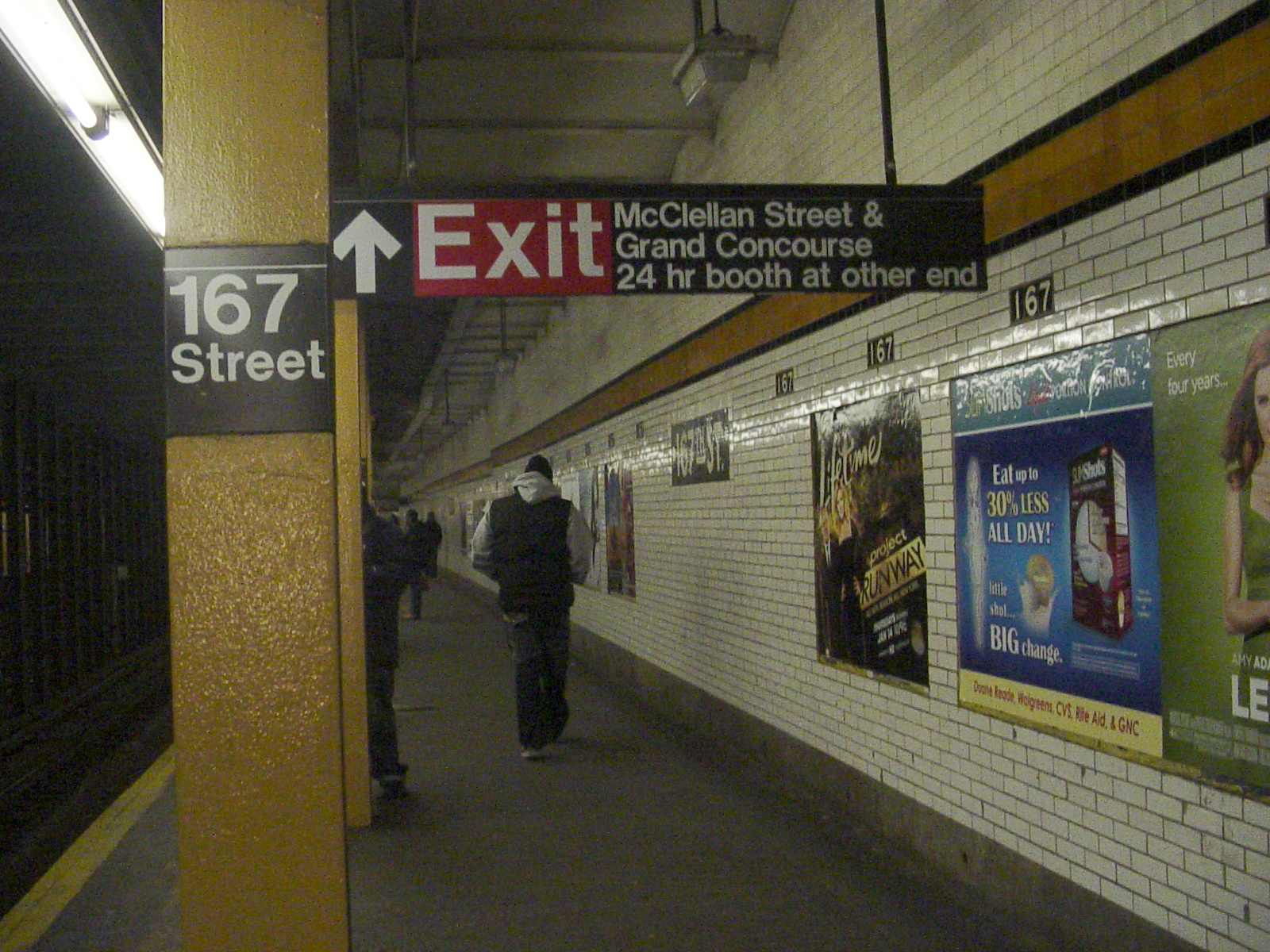
Northbound station platform pre-renovation

North of the station, a track begins on the west side of the line. It ends at a bumper block before the 170th Street station and is only used for storage of Yankee Stadium Special trains for service after their home games.

The 2019 artwork at this station is Beacons, a set of murals by Rico Gatson. The murals depict prominent figures in the Bronx, such as Maya Angelou, James Baldwin, Celia Cruz, Reggie Jackson, Audre Lorde, Tito Puente, Gil Scott-Heron, and Sonia Sotomayor.

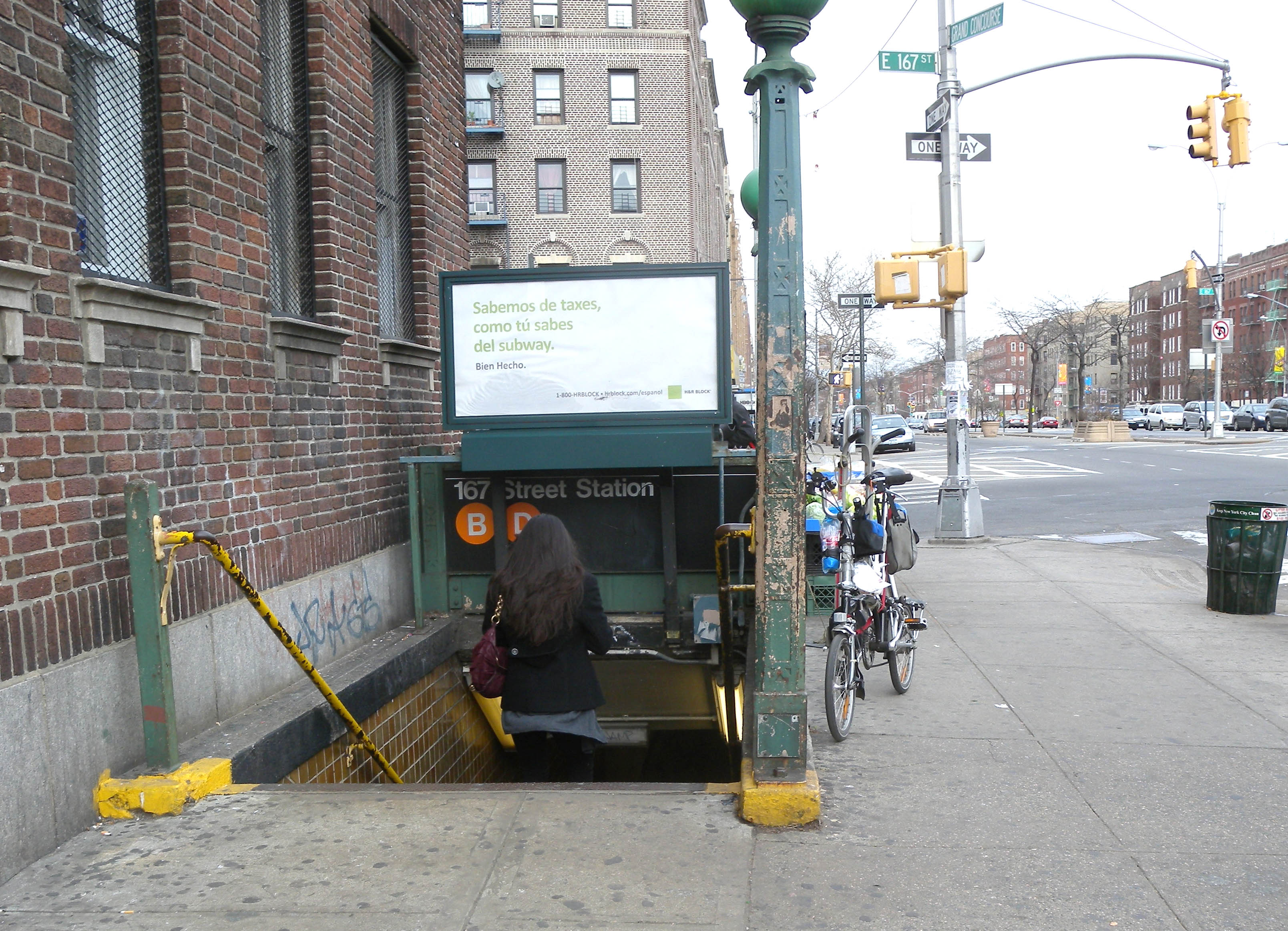
Western stair

=== Exits ===
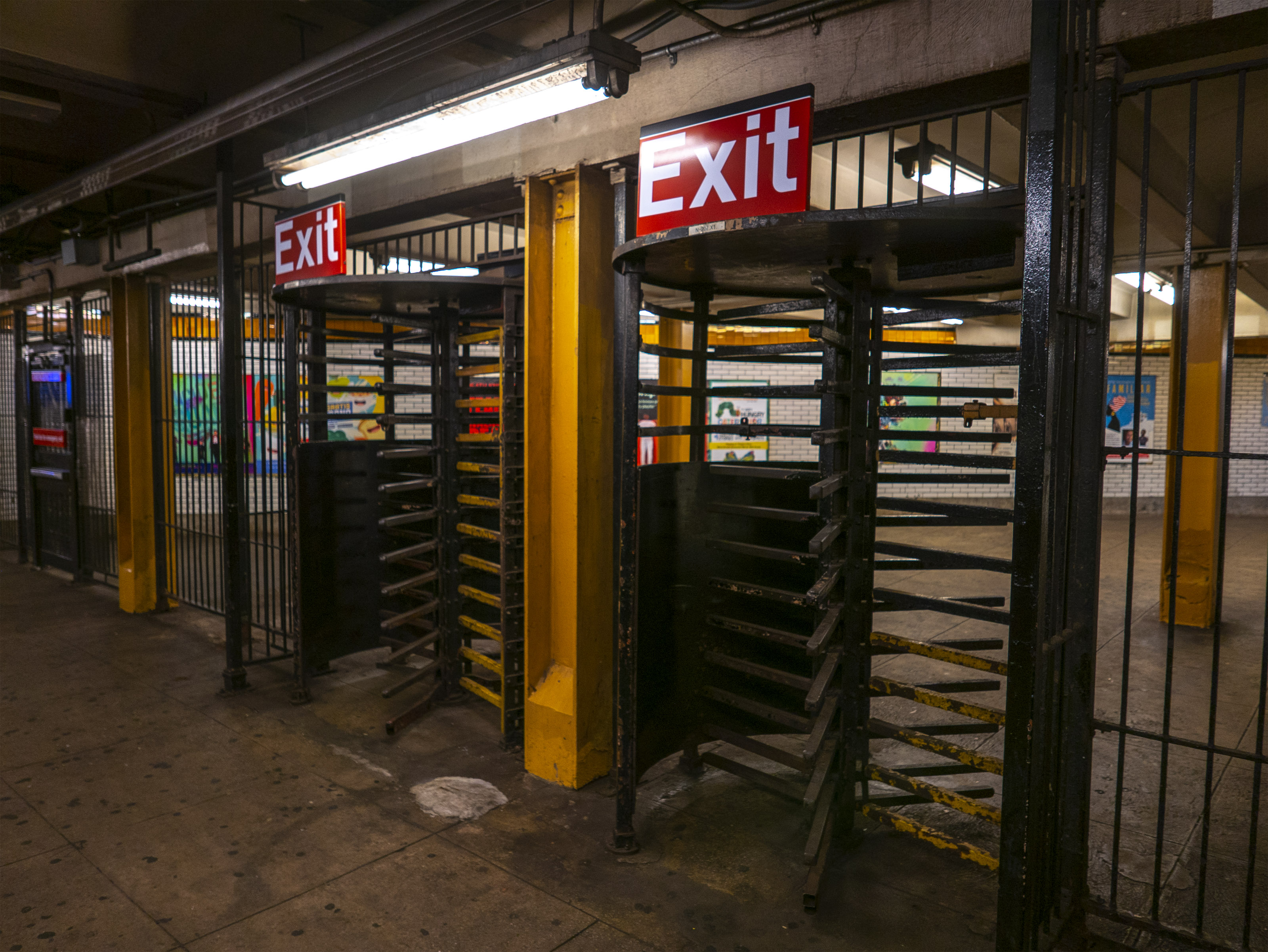
Exit-only turnstiles on the northbound platform, pre-renovation

This station's full-time mezzanine is at the north end. Two staircases from each platform go up to a waiting area, where a turnstile bank provides entrance/exit from the station and transfers between the two directions are possible. Outside fare control, there is a token booth and four staircases going up to all corners of the intersection of 167th Street and Grand Concourse. The mezzanine has mosaic directional signs in white lettering on an orange background.

Both platforms have an unstaffed same-level fare control area at the south end. On the northbound side, a set of exit-only turnstiles lead to a staircase that goes up to the southeast corner of McClellan Street and Grand Concourse. On the Manhattan-bound side, a set of turnstiles lead to a staircase that goes up to the southwest corner of the same intersection. This fare control area had a token booth until 2003.

Below this station is the 167th Street tunnel underneath the Grand Concourse. Until July 1948, there was a crosstown trolley service in this tunnel, which widens at its midpoint. In each direction, this tunnel had a trolley track, two platforms, and two road lanes. When the trolley was discontinued, the replacement Bx35 bus used the platforms until around 1990, when it was moved to the street above for quicker transfers to other bus routes and the subway. The underpass staircases were permanently closed for security reasons in 1993, and there is no pedestrian access to the underpass - which is open to vehicle traffic only - from either side on street level.

The trolley platforms led to two lower mezzanines, one to each subway platform. These lower mezzanines are at a slightly lower level than the subway platforms, and have a direct connection to them. They are not visible; a patch of newer tiling and a door in the wall near the northern end of each platform shows where the connections once were. The full-time mezzanine had two winding staircases to the underpass, one to each side. When the trolley mezzanines were closed, these staircases were gated off.
