= IND Concourse Line =

New York City Subway line

- The B train serves the IND Concourse Line south of Bedford Park Boulevard during weekdays only while the D train serves the entire line at all times.

Overview
- Owner: City of New York
- Locale: Manhattan and The Bronx
- Termini: Norwood–205th Street; 145th Street
- Stations: 12

Service
- Type: Rapid transit
- System: New York City Subway
- Operator: New York City Transit Authority
- Daily ridership: 95,616 (2023)

History
- Opened: July 1, 1933; 93 years ago

Technical
- Line length: 6.5 miles (10.5 km)
- Num of tracks: 2-3
- Character: Underground
- Track gauge: 4 ft 8 1/2 in (1,435 mm)
- Electrification: 600V DC third rail
Route map
Express station	Local station

The Concourse Line is an IND rapid transit line of the New York City Subway system. It runs from 205th Street in Norwood, Bronx, primarily under the Grand Concourse, to 145th Street in Harlem, Manhattan. It is the only B Division line in the Bronx, and also the only line in the Bronx that is entirely underground.

== Description and service ==
The following services use part or all of the IND Concourse Line:

	Time period		Section of line
	rush hours	other times	Section of line
"B" train	local		south of Bedford Park Blvd
"D" train	express (peak direction only)	local	entire line

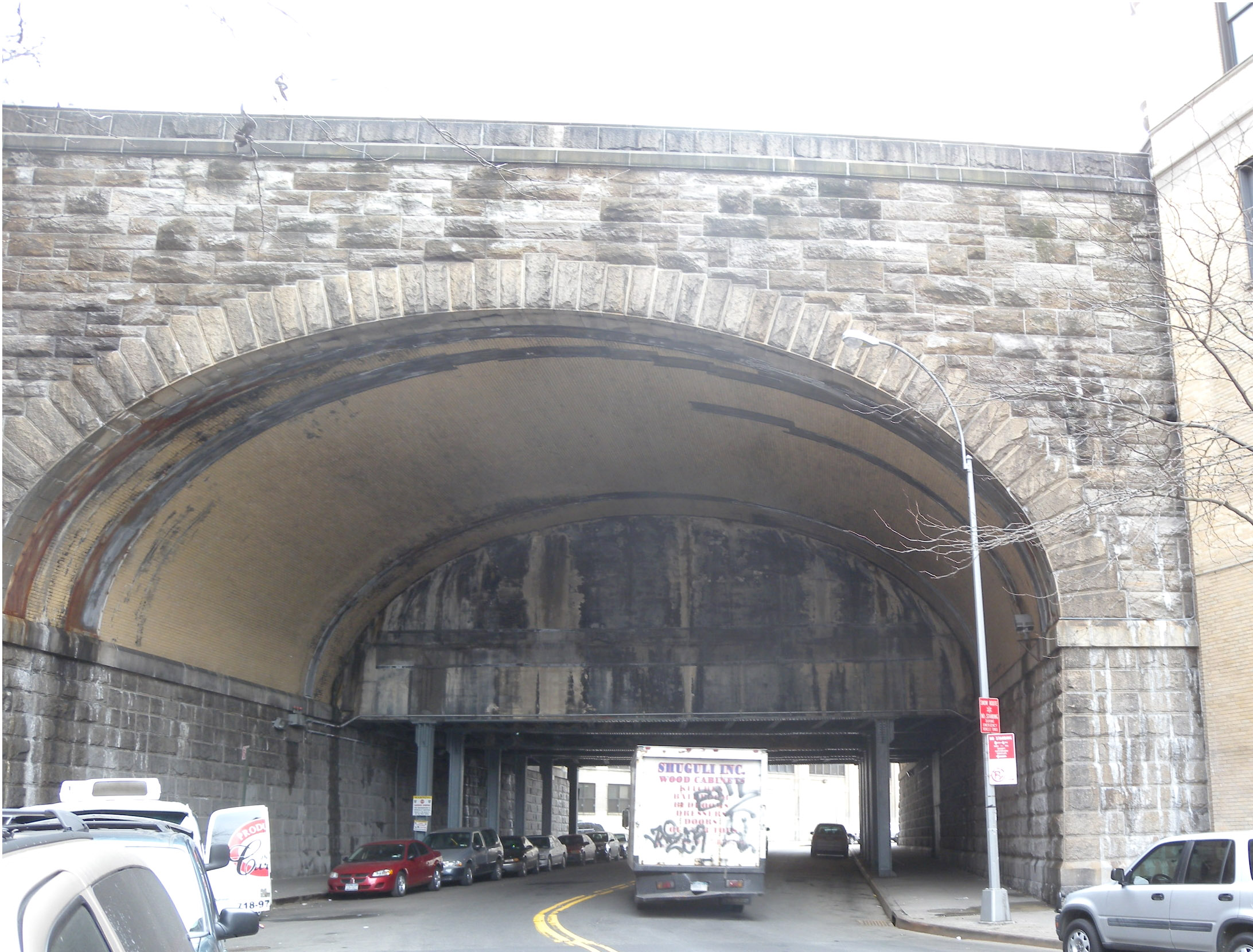
Passing over 175th Street

The Concourse Line runs north to south through the Bronx and portions of Harlem, parallel to the mostly-elevated IRT Jerome Avenue Line which lies between two and four blocks to the west for its entire length in the Bronx. Due to the steep topography of the neighborhoods surrounding the Grand Concourse (under which most of the line runs), several stations were built with entrances both above and below the platforms, including 167th Street and Kingsbridge Road. Because the line also connected with Yankee Stadium at 161st Street and with the former Polo Grounds at 155th Street, there were also several switches and a storage track to accommodate additional trains during game days.

The line begins as a two-track line at Norwood–205th Street, running east-to-west underneath East 205th Street, then under private property, then for a short portion under Van Cortlandt Avenue. As it travels west, a center track forms which leads to the Concourse Yard. The line then curves south at Mosholu Parkway to the Grand Concourse, from which it derives its name, at 206th Street. Two tracks from the Concourse Yard arrive between the two revenue tracks with switches and diamond crossovers between all four of them before the yard tracks merge to form the center track at the Bedford Park Boulevard station. The center track was intended to be used by southbound express trains in the morning and by northbound express trains in the afternoon.

South of Bedford Park Boulevard, after some crossovers, the two outer tracks depress into a lower level and merge into a single center express track, while the center track splits to become the local tracks. The line then runs south with diamond crossovers at Tremont Avenue. Due to the terrain, the vicinity of 174th–175th Street station is uniquely built both underground and over 175th Street. Between 170th Street and 167th Street are more switches and crossovers, with a lay-up track adjacent to the Manhattan-bound local track. The line curves west before 161st Street–Yankee Stadium and crosses the Harlem River into Manhattan via the Concourse Tunnel. There is one more stop, 155th Street, before the line curves south under Saint Nicholas Place, continuing under Saint Nicholas Avenue south of 148th Street. The Concourse Line then serves the lower level of the 145th Street station and joins the IND Eighth Avenue Line south of the station.

== History ==
=== Development ===
The IND Concourse Line, also referred to as the Bronx−Concourse Line, was one of the original lines of the city-owned Independent Subway System (IND). The line running from Bedford Park Boulevard to the IND Eighth Avenue Line in Manhattan was approved by the New York City Board of Transportation on March 10, 1925, with the connection between the two lines approved on March 24, 1927. The line was originally intended to be four tracks, rather than three tracks, to Bedford Park Boulevard. This is the only IND line with three tracks (all other IND lines have either two or four tracks). The Concourse line's lower level of the 145th Street station was originally provisioned for four tracks, with the current tracks lining up with those of the upper level.

Construction of the line began in July 1928. It was originally planned to end the line just past the Bedford Park Boulevard station, with a provision for an eastern extension. An alternate approach to the current 205th Street station was proposed in February 1929, extending the line across private property onto Perry Avenue. The current routing was selected by June 1929. The building of the line and proposed extensions to central and eastern Bronx (see below) led to real estate booms in the area. The line was supposed to be completed by January 1933, but this was delayed due to financial difficulties following the Wall Street Crash of 1929. Test trains began running on June 18, 1933, when 700 IND employees started operating test trains on a regular schedule. The final cost was $40.5 million.

=== Operation ===
The entire Concourse Line opened on July 1, 1933, less than ten months after the IND's first line, the IND Eighth Avenue Line, opened for service. Initial service was provided by the C train, at that time an express train, between 205th Street, then via the Eighth Avenue Line, Cranberry Street Tunnel and the IND South Brooklyn Line (now Culver Line) to Bergen Street. The CC provided local service between Bedford Park Boulevard and Hudson Terminal (now World Trade Center). Trains initially ran every 4 minutes during rush hours, every 5 minutes during the daytime off-peak, and every 12 minutes at night. The timetable called for 92 express trains and 247 local trains a day. In addition to peak-direction express service (southbound in the morning and northbound in the afternoon), there was a "theater express" service, which ran southbound toward the Theater District for about half an hour during the evening.

On December 15, 1940, with the opening of the IND Sixth Avenue Line, the D train began serving the IND Concourse Line along with the C and CC. It made express stops in peak during rush hours and Saturdays and local stops at all other times. C express service was discontinued in 1949–51, but the C designation was reinstated in 1985 when the use of double letters to indicate local service was discontinued. During this time, the D made local stops along the Concourse Line at all times except rush hours, when the C ran local to Bedford Park Boulevard. On March 1, 1998, the B train replaced the C as the rush-hour local on the Concourse Line, with the C moving to the Washington Heights portion of the Eighth Avenue Line.

Kingsbridge Road was rehabilitated with new elevators in December 2014. The 2015–2019 MTA Capital Plan called for the Concourse Line's 167th Street and 174th–175th Streets stations, along with 30 others, to undergo a complete overhaul as part of the Enhanced Station Initiative. Updates would include cellular service, Wi-Fi, USB charging stations, interactive service advisories and maps, improved signage, and improved station lighting. 174th–175th Streets reopened on December 26, 2018.

In June 2022, the MTA announced that the express track would be closed starting that July, with D trains using the local tracks at all times until the end of 2022. The closure would allow the MTA to conduct structural repairs to the line, including steel and concrete work; the project was to be completed in September 2024. During that time, the line would also be closed for 40 weekends, and there would be overnight work for 75 weeks. The MTA would operate a shuttle bus between Norwood–205th Street and the 4 train at Mosholu Parkway station.

=== Provisions for expansion ===
The Concourse Line is mostly straight north of 161st Street–Yankee Stadium, but makes a slight right turn north of Bedford Park Boulevard to end at Norwood–205th Street, with a provision to extend farther east. The original IND Second System Plan in 1929 proposed extending the line to Baychester Avenue via Burke Avenue and Boston Road. The extension, called "Route 106", was proposed to run elevated over Bronx Park in the lower-deck of a viaduct connecting 205th Street and Burke Avenue. The first stop on the extension would have been at White Plains and Gun Hill Roads. The Second System plans had multiple IND lines criss-crossing the five boroughs; however, the country was in the midst of the Great Depression, and the city had neither the money nor the need to either extend the line east of 205th Street or make the line four tracks.

A second plan in the 1930s had an additional extension along Burke Avenue to the New York, Westchester and Boston Railway, running north along the railroad to Dyre Avenue. Preliminary engineering work for the extension along Burke Avenue took place in 1937 and 1938. The city, however, found it easier and less expensive to purchase the railroad (now the IRT Dyre Avenue Line) and connect it with the IRT White Plains Road Line, which hampered the Burke Avenue−Boston Road extension of the Concourse Line to Baychester Avenue. In the 1960s and 1970 under the city's Program for Action, it was proposed to extend the line a short distance to White Plains Road and Burke Avenue, at the IRT White Plains Road Line. Financial troubles also caused the plan to be aborted.

== Station listing ==
Station service legend
Stops all times	Stops 24 hours a day
Stops all times except late nights	Stops every day during daytime hours only
Stops weekdays during the day	Stops during weekday daytime hours only
Stops all times except rush hours in the peak direction	Stops 24 hours a day, except during weekday rush hours in the peak direction
Stops rush hours only	Stops during weekday rush hours only
Time period details
Disabled access	Station is compliant with the Americans with Disabilities Act
↑	Station is compliant with the Americans with Disabilities Act in the indicated direction only
↓	Station is compliant with the Americans with Disabilities Act in the indicated direction only
	Elevator access to mezzanine only

Neighborhood (approximate)	Disabled access	Station	Tracks	Services	Opened	Transfers and notes
Norwood		Norwood–205th Street	all	D	July 1, 1933	
Center track begins from connection to Concourse Yard
Bedford Park	Disabled access	Bedford Park Boulevard	all	B D	July 1, 1933	Northern terminal of B trains during all weekday rush hours and select weekday middays.
Bedford Park	Disabled access	Kingsbridge Road	all	B D	July 1, 1933	
Fordham Heights		Fordham Road	all	B D	July 1, 1933	Bx12 Select Bus Service; Connection to Metro-North Railroad (Harlem and New Haven Lines at Fordham)
Fordham Heights		182nd–183rd Streets	local	B D	July 1, 1933	
Tremont	Disabled access	Tremont Avenue	all	B D	July 1, 1933	
Tremont		174th–175th Streets	local	B D	July 1, 1933	
Highbridge		170th Street	local	B D	July 1, 1933	
Highbridge / Concourse		167th Street	local	B D	July 1, 1933	
Highbridge / Concourse	Disabled access	161st Street–Yankee Stadium	local	B D	July 1, 1933	Bx6 Select Bus Service; IRT Jerome Avenue Line (4 ) Connection to Metro-North Railroad (Hudson Line at Yankees–East 153rd Street)
Crosses Harlem River into Manhattan via the Concourse Tunnel
Harlem		155th Street	local	B D	July 1, 1933	
Harlem		145th Street	all	B D	September 10, 1932	IND Eighth Avenue Line (A C ) Northern terminal of B trains during select weekday middays and all weekday evenings.
Merges with IND Eighth Avenue Line (B D )
