= Kingsbridge Road station (IND Concourse Line) =

New York City Subway station in the Bronx

Kingsbridge Road
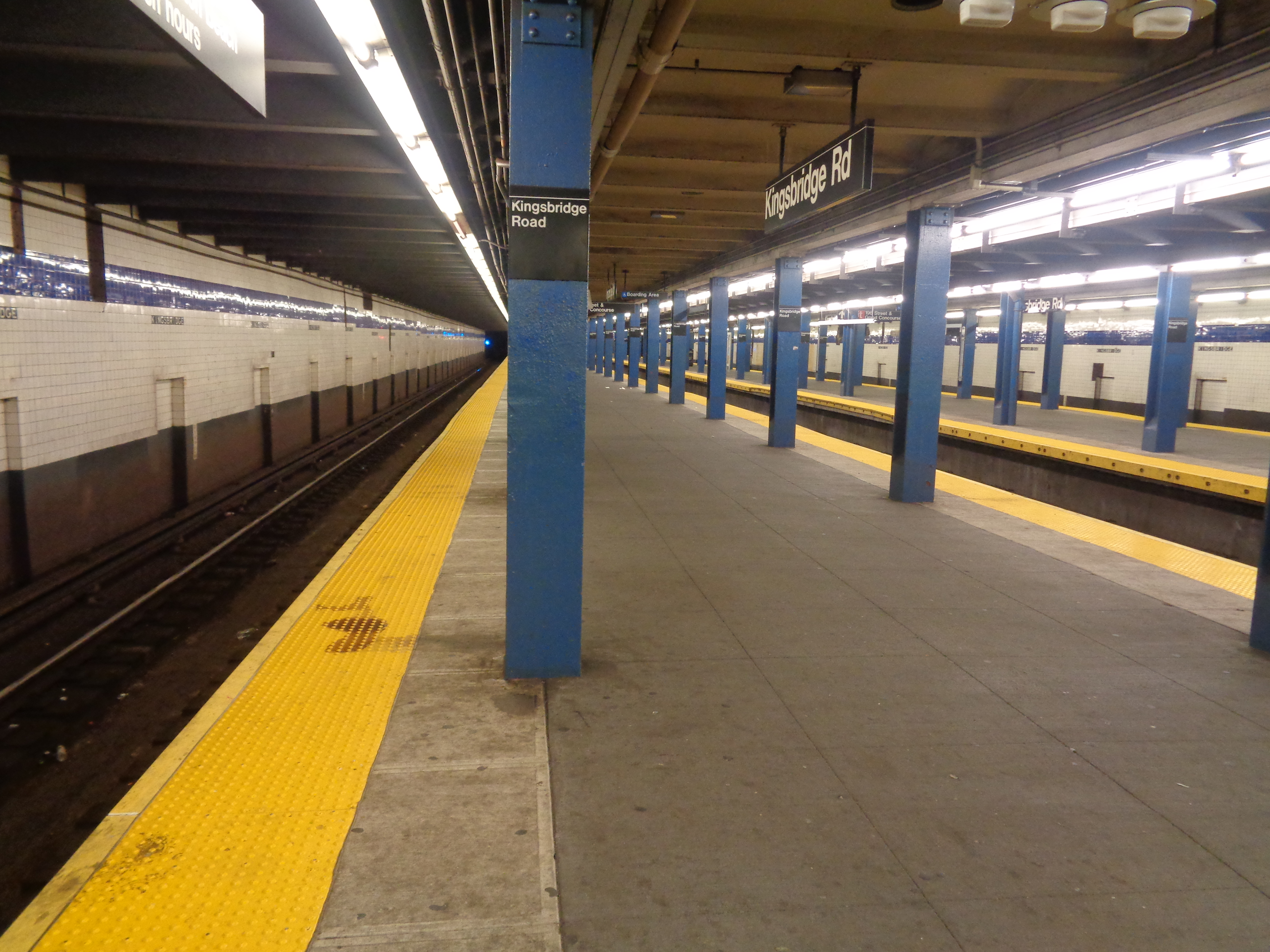
- View from the southbound platform

Station statistics
- Address: East Kingsbridge Road & Grand Concourse; Bronx, New York
- Borough: The Bronx
- Locale: Fordham Manor, Kingsbridge Heights
- Coordinates: 40.866146°N 73.894343°W
- Division: B (IND)
- Line: IND Concourse Line
- Services: B (weekdays only); D (all times)
- Transit: NYCT Bus: Bx1, Bx2, Bx9, Bx22, Bx28; MTA Bus: BxM4
- Structure: Underground
- Platforms: 2 island platforms cross-platform interchange
- Tracks: 3

Other information
- Opened: July 1, 1933; 93 years ago
- Accessible: Yes

Traffic
- 2025: 1,336,891 ▲16.2%
- Rank: 250 out of 423
Services
Preceding station	New York City Subway	Following station
Bedford Park Boulevard B D toward Norwood–205th Street	D (New York City Subway service)	Fordham Road B D toward Coney Island–Stillwell Avenue
Location
Location within New York City Subway
Location within New York City
Location within New York
Track layout
Street map
Station service legend
Symbol	Description
Stops all times except rush hours in the peak direction	Stops all times except rush hours in the peak direction
Stops all times	Stops all times
Stops rush hours only	Stops rush hours only
Stops weekdays during the day	Stops weekdays during the day

The Kingsbridge Road station is an express station on the IND Concourse Line of the New York City Subway. Located within the Fordham Manor and Kingsbridge Heights neighborhoods in the Bronx, it is served by the D train at all times and the B train weekdays only. It has three tracks and two island platforms.

== History ==
This station was built as part of the IND Concourse Line, which was one of the original lines of the city-owned Independent Subway System (IND). The route of the Concourse Line was approved to Bedford Park Boulevard on June 12, 1925 by the New York City Board of Transportation. Construction of the line began in July 1928. The station opened on July 1, 1933, along with the rest of the Concourse subway.

Elevators at the station opened in December 2014, making it compliant with the Americans with Disabilities Act of 1990. The Metropolitan Transportation Authority announced in 2024 that it would replace the station's existing waist-high turnstiles with taller, wide-aisle turnstiles.

== Station layout ==
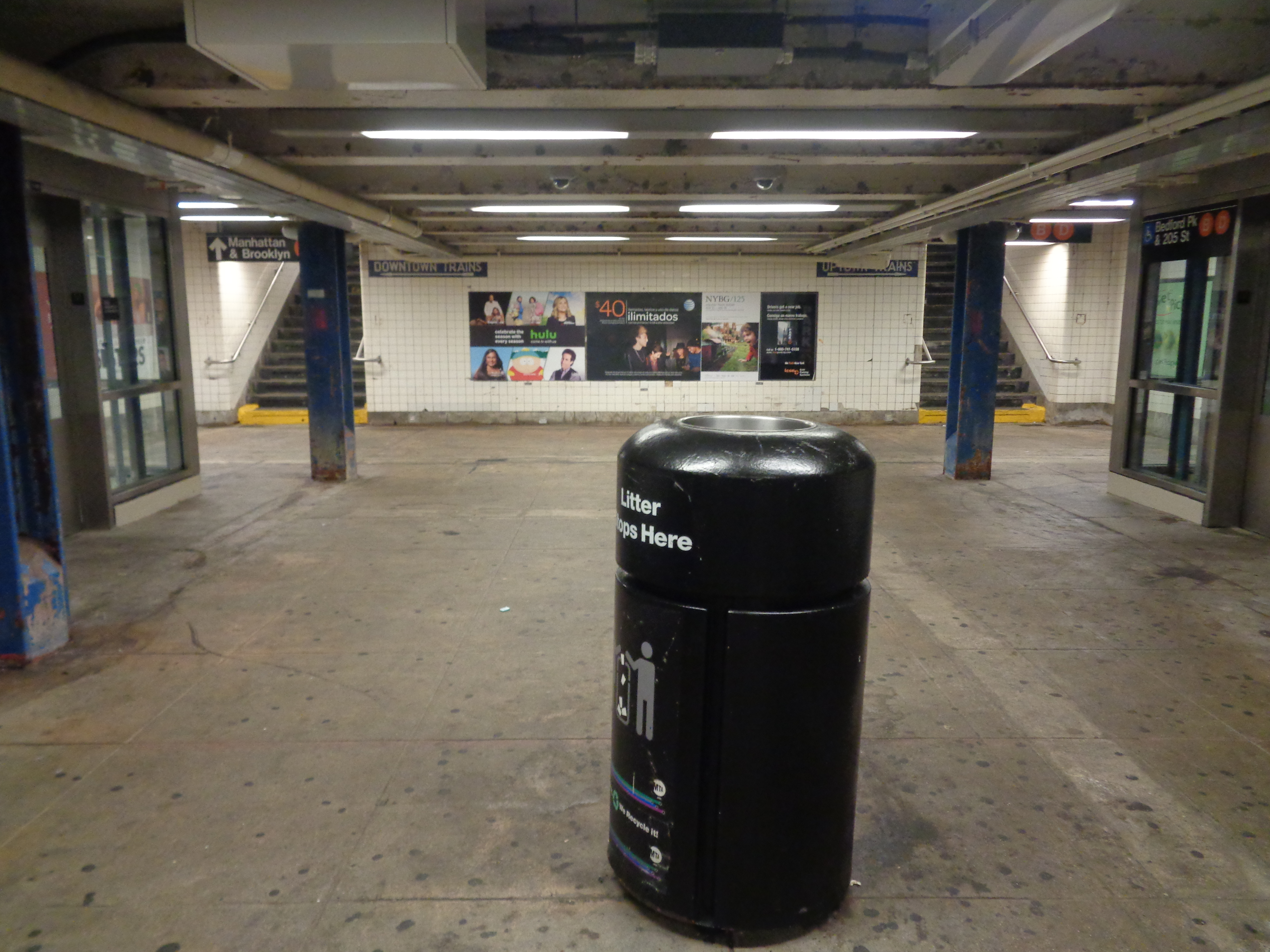
The ADA-compliant Kingsbridge Road mezzanine located below platform level

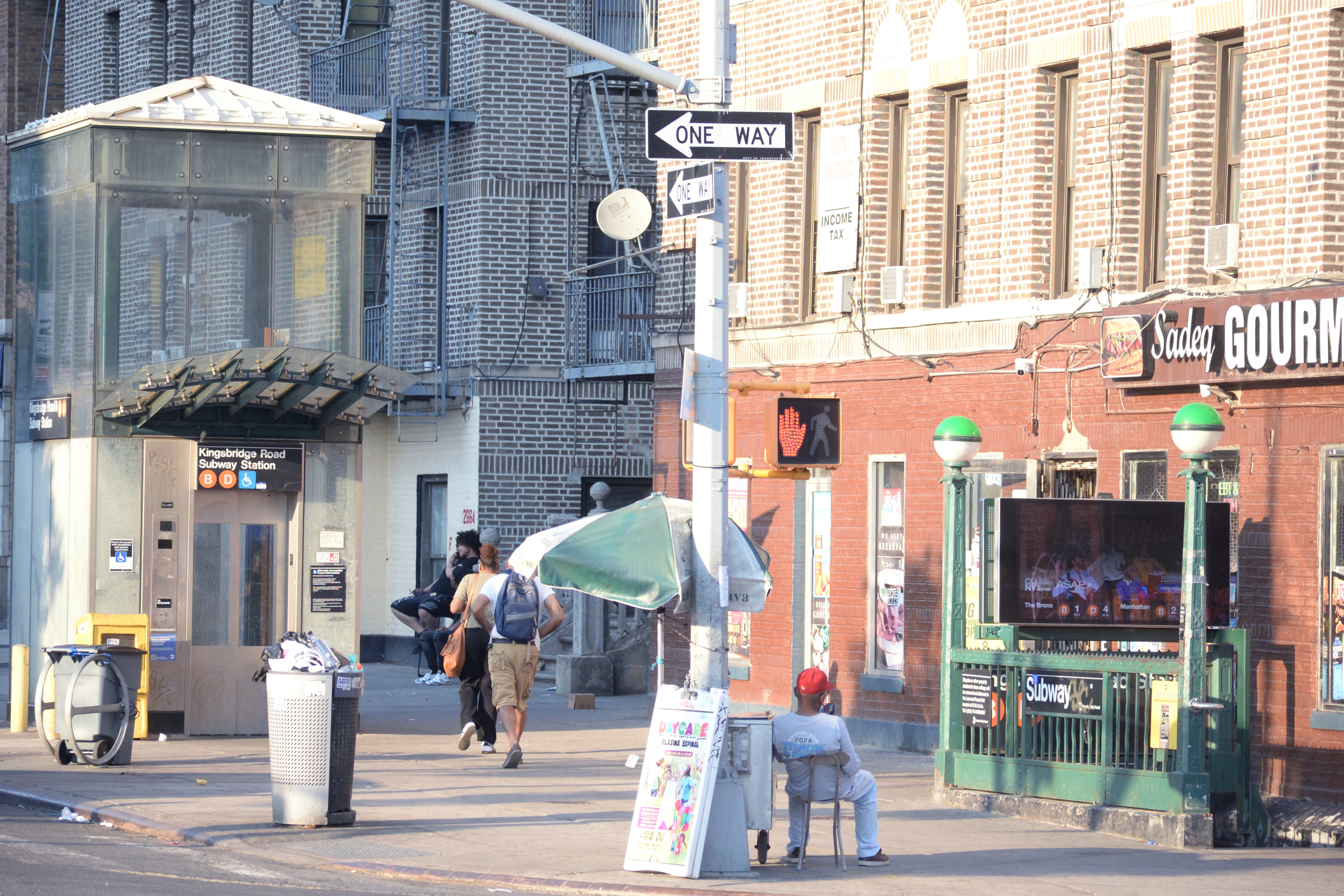
Staircase and elevator on the northeast corner of the station

The station has three tracks and two island platforms. The tile band in this station is Marine Blue and vent chambers are also present. White walls exist at the two northernmost platform staircases to the Kingsbridge Road exit. It is not known why they were built.

The station was renovated to comply with ADA standards, with one elevator from each platform to the Kingsbridge Road mezzanine underneath it, and another from the mezzanine to the northeast corner of the Concourse and Kingsbridge Road.

=== Exits ===
The station has one mezzanine above the platforms and another below them. The part-time and unstaffed entrance is at 196th Street on the north end and contains two street stairs to the northwest and southeast corners of the intersection, and one stair to each platform. This mezzanine is above the platform area.

The full-time entrance with a staffed token booth is at Kingsbridge Road on the south end and contains three pairs of staircases from platform level down to the lower mezzanine. Exits to the street are via a staircase to either northern corner of Kingsbridge Road and Grand Concourse; the exit to the northeastern corner also has an elevator. A ramp also leads to the north side of the Kingsbridge Road underpass, below the Grand Concourse.

The current booth setup (full-time at Kingsbridge; part-time at 196th Street) was instituted in 2013. This was also the original setup. From a booth operation switch in the 1990s until the switch in 2013, the part-time side was at the current full-time side (Kingsbridge) and vice versa. The current setup was created in order to accommodate new elevators in the station.

There is a closed passageway that begins next to the current exit to the Kingsbridge Road underpass, which led to an exit on the south side of the underpass. This exit is sealed by a concrete wall, and the stair to the passageway is walled off. During the summer of 2019, the underpass was the center of unsanitary conditions, a hangout spot for the homeless and a hotspot for fights and drug addicts. As a safety measure, the walkway was sealed off to the public on July 10, 2020.

Both exits to Kingsbridge Road and Grand Concourse also have closed passageways to both southern corners of the same intersection. They are sealed on street level. The passageway to the southwestern corner is blocked by a metal wall, and the one to the southeastern corner was walled off following the installation of the elevator shaft to the northeast corner.
