= Bedford Park Boulevard station =

New York City Subway station in the Bronx

Bedford Park Blvd
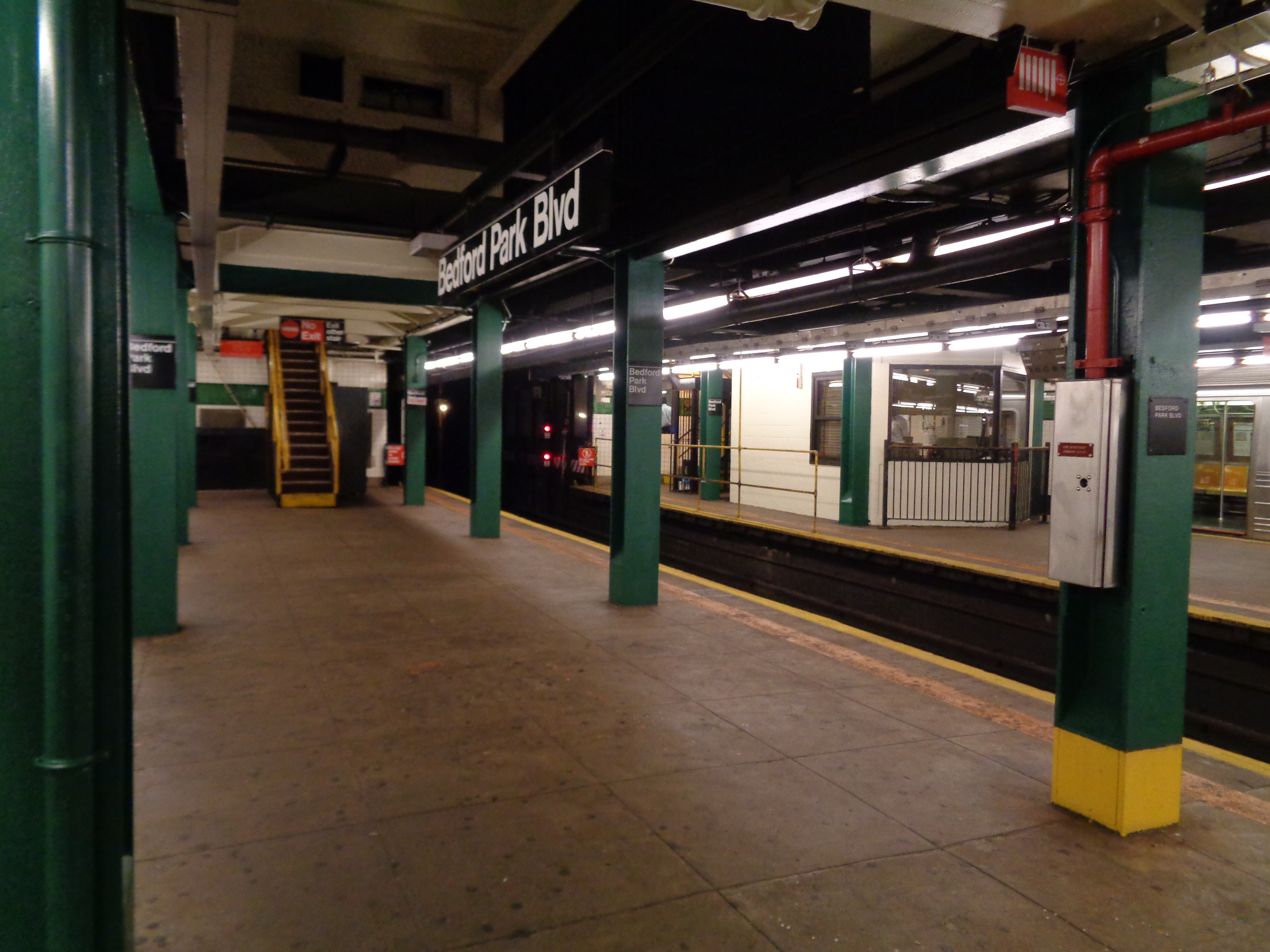
- Looking south on the Norwood-bound platform

Station statistics
- Address: Bedford Park Boulevard & Grand Concourse; Bronx, New York
- Borough: The Bronx
- Locale: Bedford Park
- Coordinates: 40.872507°N 73.887906°W
- Division: B (IND)
- Line: IND Concourse Line
- Services: B (weekdays only); D (all times)
- Transit: NYCT Bus: Bx1, Bx2, Bx25, Bx26; MTA Bus: BxM4
- Structure: Underground
- Platforms: 2 island platforms cross-platform interchange
- Tracks: 3

Other information
- Opened: July 1, 1933; 93 years ago
- Accessible: Yes

Traffic
- 2025: 1,324,631 ▲14.1%
- Rank: 255 out of 423
Services
Preceding station	New York City Subway	Following station
Norwood–205th Street D Terminus	D (New York City Subway service)	Kingsbridge Road B D toward Coney Island–Stillwell Avenue
Location
Location within New York City Subway
Location within New York City
Location within New York
Track layout
Street map
Station service legend
Symbol	Description
Stops all times except rush hours in the peak direction	Stops all times except rush hours in the peak direction
Stops all times	Stops all times
Stops rush hours only	Stops rush hours only
Stops weekdays during the day	Stops weekdays during the day

The Bedford Park Boulevard station is an express station on the IND Concourse Line of the New York City Subway. Located at Bedford Park Boulevard and Grand Concourse in Bedford Park, Bronx, it is served by the D train at all times. It is also the northern terminal for the B train on weekdays.

== History ==
The station was built as part of the sixth and seventh sections of the IND Concourse Line beginning in the late 1920s. The route of the Concourse Line was approved to Bedford Park Boulevard on June 12, 1925 by the New York City Board of Transportation. The line was originally planned to end just north of the Bedford Park Boulevard station, with a provision for an eastern extension. An alternate approach to the current 205th Street station was proposed in February 1929, extending the line across private property onto Perry Avenue. The current routing was selected by June 1929. The station opened on July 1, 1933, along with the rest of the Concourse subway.

As part of the 2015–2019 Metropolitan Transportation Authority Capital Program, elevators were added to the platforms and street, which makes the station fully compliant with accessibility guidelines under the Americans with Disabilities Act of 1990. A contract for the elevators' construction was awarded in April 2018, and substantial completion was projected for June 2020. However, because of the COVID-19 pandemic, completion was pushed back to September 2020, and eventually further back to October 15, 2020, when the elevators finally opened.

== Station layout ==
This underground station has three tracks and two island platforms. Both outer track walls have a lawn green trim line on a darker green border. There are small black "BEDFORD" signs with white lettering below them at regular intervals. Dark green I-beam columns run along both sides of both platforms at regular intervals with alternating ones having the standard black station name plate in white lettering.

There is an equipment room on the south end of the northbound platform. Additionally, a short, one-car length platform is in the tunnel just north of the southbound platform after a gap of about one or two car lengths.

Because Norwood–205th Street (the next stop north) was not intended to be the last stop, trains have their crews changed at this station, as 205th Street does not have any crew quarters.

=== Exits ===
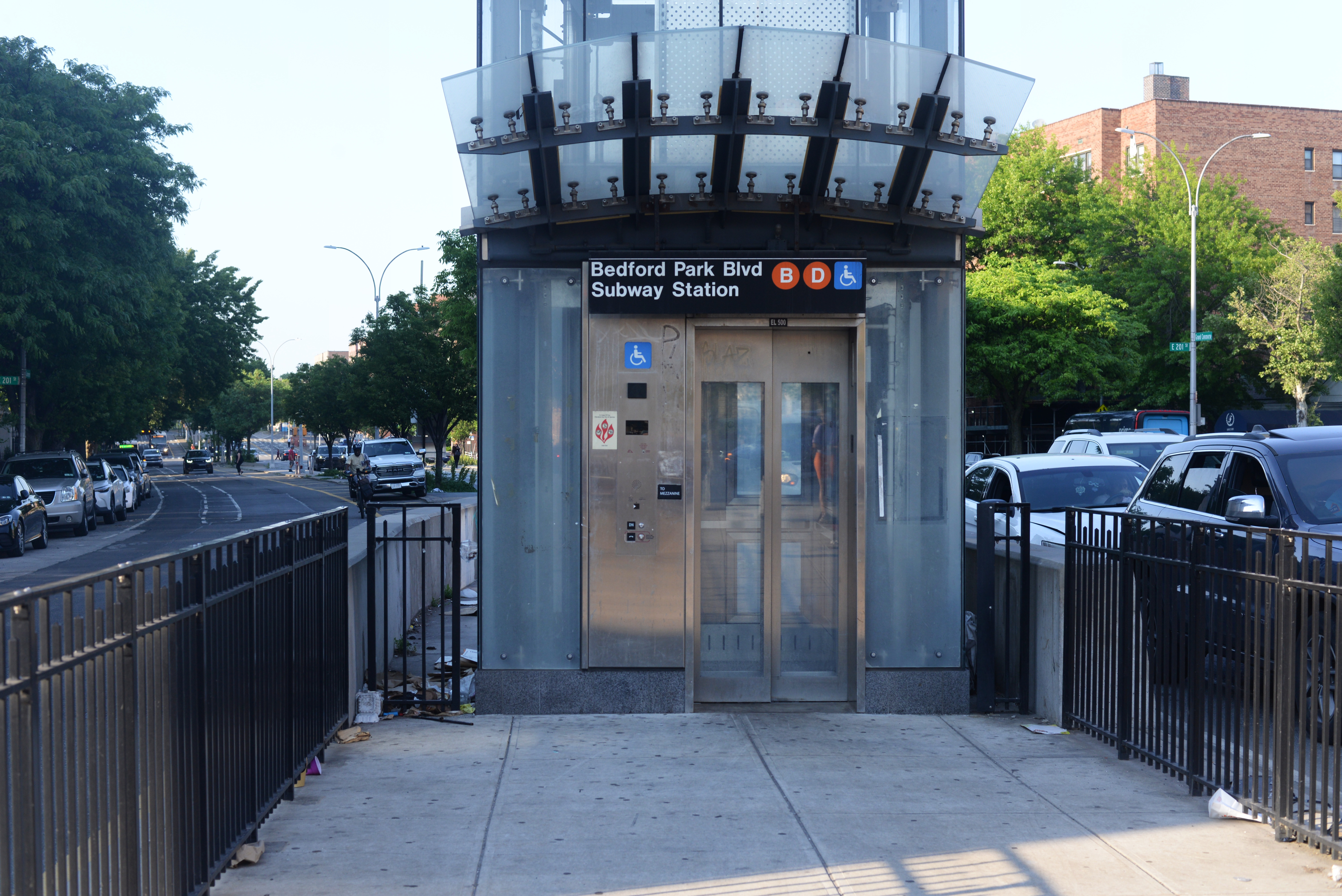
Elevator entrance to the station

This station has two mezzanines above the platform, but formerly had a full-length one. The closed portion is now a master tower that controls the entire Concourse Line. Both platforms also have several closed staircases to this area. The full-time fare control is at the south end of this station. Staircases from each platform go up to a crossover, where a turnstile bank provides access to and from the station. Outside the turnstile bank is a token booth. From outside the turnstile bank, one staircase goes up to either northern corner of Bedford Park Boulevard and Grand Concourse, while a double-wide staircase goes down to the northern sidewalk of an underpass carrying Bedford Park Boulevard below the Grand Concourse.

The fare control area at the north end of the station is unstaffed, containing just full height turnstiles, one staircase going up to the northeast corner of 203rd Street and Grand Concourse, and another staircase going up to the west side of Grand Concourse near this intersection.

The elevator is located on the north side of Bedford Park Boulevard, in the island between both southbound roads of Grand Concourse.

=== Track layout ===
South of this station, the center track splits into two and forms the local tracks of the line while the outer tracks pass under the two center tracks and merge into a single track between them. This center track is the express track of the line and is only used during rush hours in the peak direction. The track layout allows for trains stopping on the outer tracks to remain on the local tracks for the rest of the line. North of the station, the center track widens to two tracks that lead to the Concourse Yard to the west. The outer tracks curve to the east to Norwood–205th Street, the last stop on this line.
