= Sedgwick Avenue =

Avenue in the Bronx, New York

Coordinates: 40°51′37.59″N 73°54′40.74″W

- Hip Hop Boulevard
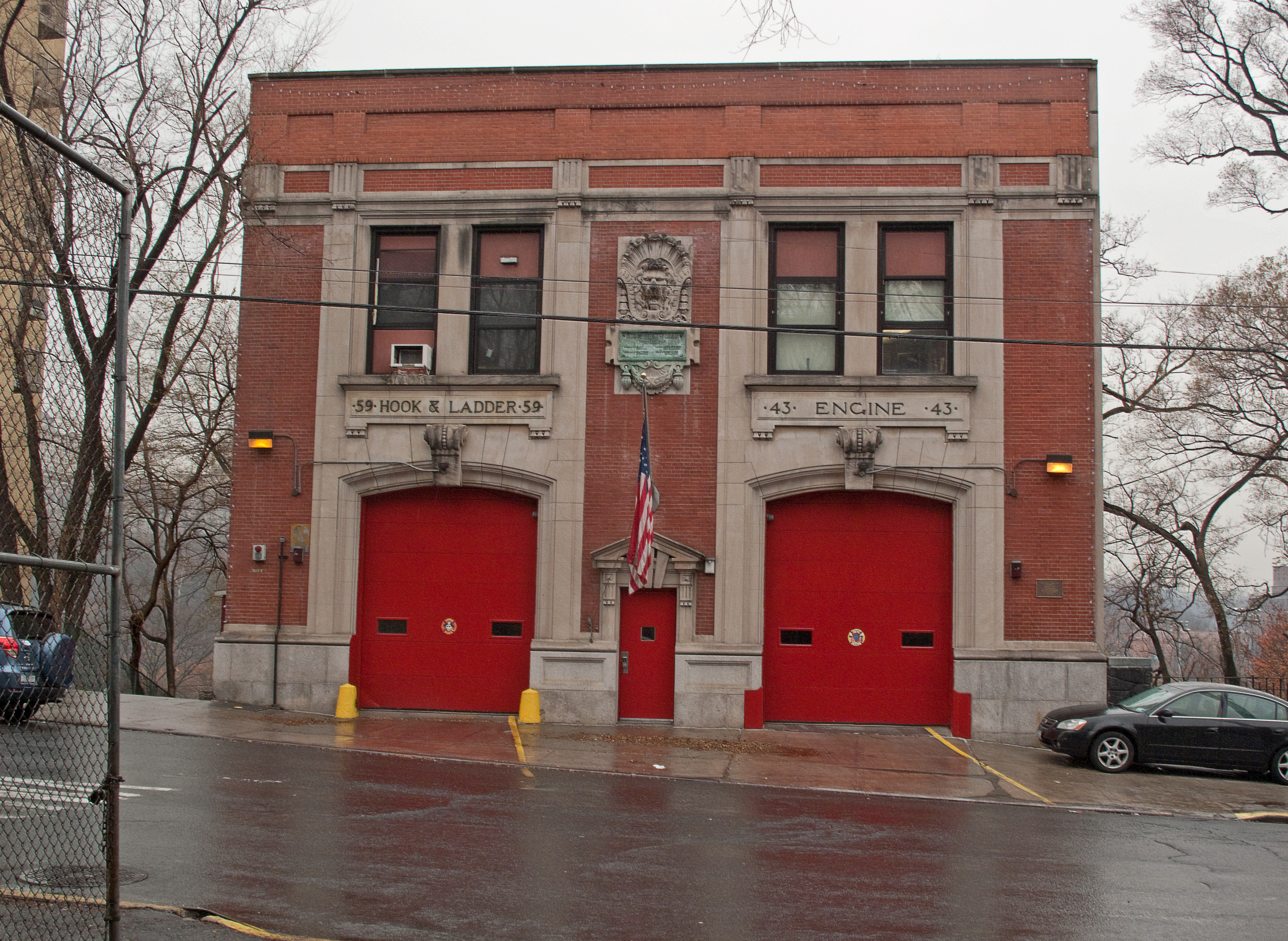
- FDNY Engine 43, Ladder 59 station in Morris Heights
- Owner: City of New York
- Maintained by: NYCDOT
- Length: 4.8 mi (7.7 km)
- Location: Bronx, New York City
- Nearest metro station: IRT Jerome Avenue Line
- South end: Jerome Avenue in Highbridge
- Major junctions: I-87 in Highbridge
- North end: Mosholu Parkway in Bedford Park

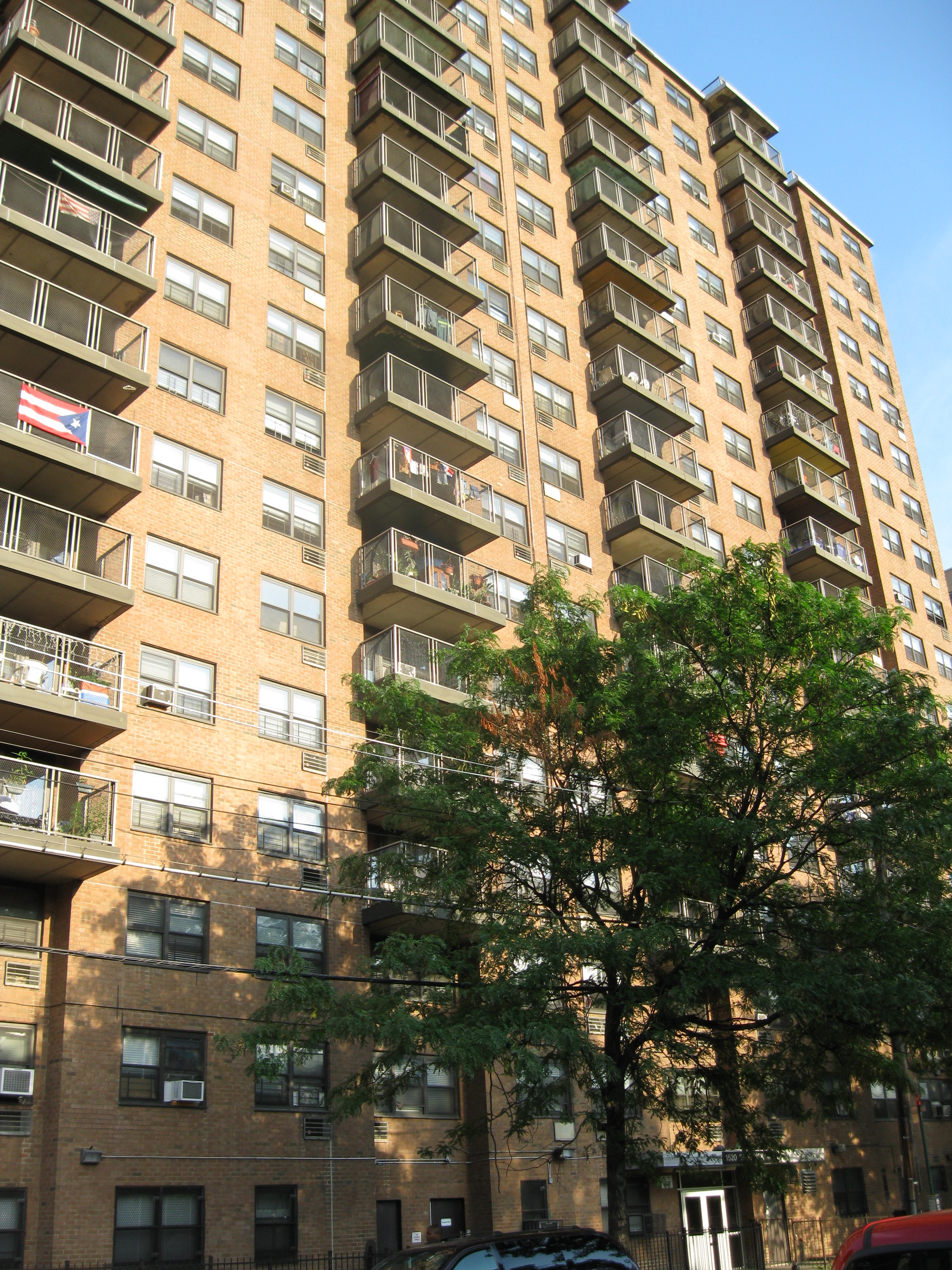
1520 Sedgwick Avenue where DJ Kool Herc threw his first parties

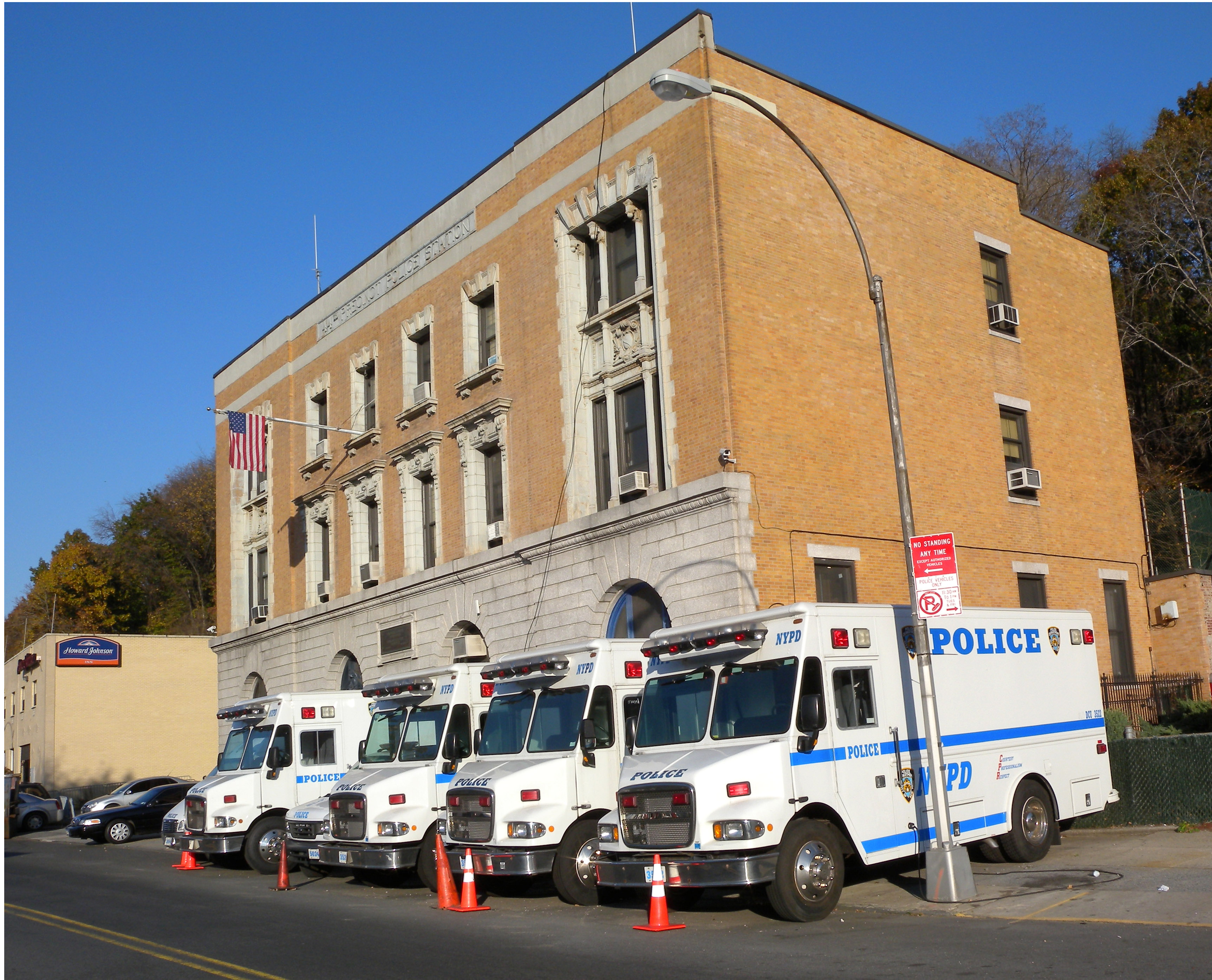
Strategic Response Group 2 (SRG 2) stationhouse, NYPD, Sedgwick Avenue

Sedgwick Avenue is a major street in the Bronx, New York City. It runs roughly parallel to Jerome Avenue, the Major Deegan Expressway, and University Avenue. Sedgwick Avenue is one of the longest streets in the western part of the Bronx, running from Mosholu Parkway at the north to Macombs Dam Bridge at its southern end, about 800 feet (250 m) west of Yankee Stadium.

A smaller Sedgwick Avenue continues into Yonkers, north of Van Cortlandt Park and east of the Saw Mill River Parkway.

== History ==
The street was originally named after a Hessian officer named Emmerich. It was renamed for John Sedgwick in 1886.

From the early 20th century until the 1970s, Sedgwick Avenue was one of the busiest thoroughfares in the Bronx, having streetcars, buses, and train stations. Around 1900, it was a popular road for weekend bicycle tours and military marches to Van Cortlandt Park.

From 1918 to 1958, the Sedgwick Avenue elevated station operated at Webster Avenue.

New York City Mayor Bill de Blasio signed a bill on February 26, 2016, renaming 42 streets and places in New York City. One of the renamed blocks was a block where 1520 Sedgwick Ave is located which was renamed “Hip Hop Boulevard" after DJ Kool Herc who threw a "back to school jam " at 1520 Sedgwick Avenue, and at that party, hip-hop began. DJ Kool Herc had moved his parties to Cedar Park, "attracting b-boys and cool kids from across the Bronx [in] 1974."

== Route description ==
The avenue starts as a northbound service road, running north–south, to Major Deegan Expressway (Interstate 87) at around the Macombs Dam Bridge. Morris Heights, Bronx is adjacent to this section of the avenue. It splits northeast and becomes two-way at West 167th Street; Roberto Clemente State Park is at this intersection, and the University Woods, overlooking the Harlem River, a small wood land crested between Sedgwick and Cedar Avenues, is also nearby. Along this stretch, the Putnam Line had a station at Sedgwick Avenue. The NYPD's Strategic Response Group 2 stationhouse is located on Sedgwick Avenue at 169th Street. Sedgwick Avenue remains a primary thoroughfare through University Heights and Kingsbridge Heights; ZIP codes include 10463, 10467, and 10468. The Sedgwick Avenue station was a train station on the abandoned section of the IRT Ninth Avenue Line from 1918 until 1958. The New York City Housing Authority has a number of large apartment complexes along the avenue. The avenue then turns east, and runs near the west and north sides of the Jerome Park Reservoir. Mosholu Parkway intersects with Sedgwick Avenue at its northern end.

This mostly two-way thoroughfare passes two historic sites:

- The Hall of Fame for Great Americans directly overlooks Sedgwick Avenue.
- DJ Kool Herc is credited with helping to start hip hop and rap music at a house concert at 1520 Sedgwick Avenue.

== Transportation ==
Streetcars used to serve Sedgwick until buses took over. The following Bronx buses run along the avenue:

- Sedgwick Avenue’s main local bus is the Bx18B. All trips go north from West 167th Street to West Tremont Avenue.
- Express service is provided by the BxM3 between West Fordham Road and Van Cortlandt Avenue West.
- The Bx1 and Bx2 serve Sedgwick north of Fort Independence Street, where the latter terminates. From there, the Bx3 provides service to West Kingsbridge Road.
- Additional service north of Van Cortlandt Avenue West is provided by the Bx10.
