= Hip Hop Boulevard =

- Interactive map of Hip Hop Boulevard
- Location: Morris Heights, The Bronx, New York City
- Postal code: 10453
- Coordinates: 40.8471°N 73.9243°W
- South end: Depot Place
- North end: 1520 Sedgwick Avenue

Construction
- Commissioned: February 2016

Hip Hop Boulevard is a co-named section of Sedgwick Avenue in the Morris Heights neighborhood of the Bronx, New York City. Established in February 2016, the honorary street designation recognizes the location as the birthplace of hip hop culture, specifically commemorating 1520 Sedgwick Avenue, where DJ Kool Herc held a pivotal party on August 11, 1973, that is widely credited as the birth of hip hop.

== History ==
Hip Hop Boulevard honors 1520 Sedgwick Avenue, a 102-unit apartment building in Morris Heights that has been historically recognized as the birthplace of hip hop. On August 11, 1973, 18-year-old Clive Campbell, known as DJ Kool Herc, and his sister Cindy Campbell hosted a back-to-school party in the building's ground-floor recreation room. At this event, Herc pioneered the breakbeat technique, using two turntables to extend the instrumental breaks of funk records, allowing dancers more time to perform. This innovation, combined with the emergence of MCing over the beats, laid the foundation for hip hop culture.

The New York State Office of Parks, Recreation and Historic Preservation officially recognized 1520 Sedgwick Avenue as the birthplace of hip hop on July 5, 2007. The building became a focal point for preservation efforts when owners threatened to convert it to market-rate housing in the 2000s, prompting advocacy from hip hop pioneers and housing activists to maintain its affordable housing status.

=== Co-naming initiative ===
The street co-naming initiative began in 2008 when Terry Nelson, former acting District Manager of Community Board 10 in central Harlem and co-director of the Hip Hop Culture Center in Harlem, launched the effort after hosting Kool Herc birthday celebrations in collaboration with DJ Tony Tone Cold Crush, Alexander Pizarro, and local historian Jacob Morris of the Harlem Historical Society. The process took nearly a decade to complete, facing various administrative and political challenges before gaining approval. The initiative received support from multiple organizations and hip hop pioneers, including the Windows of Hip Hop nonprofit, and legendary artists such as Grandmaster Caz, Melle Mel, and DJ Grand Wizard Theodore. Members of the Universal Zulu Nation also endorsed the designation.

=== Official designation ===
The co-naming of Sedgwick avenue to Hip Hop Boulevard was approved by the Bronx Community Board 5 unanimously. The New York City Council approved the street co-naming on February 5, 2016, under legislation introduced by Councilwoman Vanessa Gibson, who represents the district that includes the street. Mayor Bill de Blasio signed the measure on February 26, 2016, officially establishing Hip Hop Boulevard as a co-named section of Sedgwick Avenue. The designated stretch runs from Depot Place to 1520 Sedgwick Avenue, running parallel to the Major Deegan Expressway and the Harlem River.

The official designation was celebrated with a ceremony in June 2017 as part of the first Global Hip Hop Day block party at Cedar Playground. The event, hosted in partnership with Apple Music, Hot 97, the Mayor's Office of Media & Entertainment, Councilwoman Vanessa Gibson, and Borough President Ruben Diaz Jr., featured notable hip hop artists including Kid Capri, Fat Joe, Remy Ma, Slick Rick, and Doug E. Fresh. Music was provided by Hot 97's DJ Enuff, Funk Flex, DJ Camilo, and Kastone.

== Cultural significance ==
Hip Hop Boulevard serves as a landmark destination for hip hop enthusiasts and cultural tourists visiting the Bronx. The street co-naming serves as official recognition of the location's role in the development of hip hop culture and subsequent worldwide cultural influence. The location has become part of cultural heritage tours that regularly stops at 1520 Sedgwick Avenue for educational visits. Tour guides, sometimes including hip hop pioneers like Grandmaster Caz, provide historical context about the birth of hip hop and its development in the Bronx during the 1970s.

New York City has further recognized the cultural importance of Hip Hop Boulevard through commemorative merchandise. In 2025, the New York City Department of Transportation released limited edition Hip Hop Boulevard street signs for sale, with proceeds benefiting the city's general fund.

== See also ==
- Sedgwick Avenue
- DJ Kool Herc
- Hip-hop
