= University Woods =

Public park in the Bronx, New York

- Interactive map of University Woods
- Type: Municipal
- Location: The Bronx, New York City, New York, United States
- Coordinates: 40.858852°N 73.91505°W
- Area: 3.3 acres (1.3 ha)
- Created: 1899
- Operator: New York City Department of Parks and Recreation

University Woods, also known as Cedar Park, is a small woodland park in the University Heights neighborhood of the Bronx in New York City. Overlooking the Harlem River, the park sits between Sedgwick and Cedar Avenues. After having been named "the city's worst park" by the New Yorkers for Parks in the years 2003–2006, a restoration project was begun in 2008 by the Friends of the Woods organization, with a $500,000 grant from Mayor Michael Bloomberg.

University Woods, formerly British Fort #8, has a two-tiered pathway and the original stone walls used by the British troops during the American Revolutionary War. The main stairs, now pending restoration, are a popular passageway between Cedar Avenue and Sedgwick Avenue and lead further up to the Hall of Fame terrace and Bronx Community College.

Friends of the Woods is an organization founded by Brandy Cochrane in 2006 to rehabilitate and maintain the park. Formerly a real estate professional she was drawn to the park while assessing housing in the vicinity. Even though Cochrane had been a resident in the neighborhood for over four years, she was stunned to discover this idyllic hideaway just blocks from her home. Since that time, she has been a public supporter of not only the preservation of rural areas in her neighborhood, but of the value of community cohesiveness, inclusiveness, and assertive actions that can be taken to improve the quality of life in urban areas.

Friends of The Woods received $500,000 from the city of New York and has set about to restore the infrastructure of University Woods. They have partnered with the Parks Department, The Harlem River Ecology Center, the New York State Horticultural Center, and many other ecologically conscious groups to make further improvements to this once abandoned woodland. DJ Kool Herc, who grew up near the park in the 1970s, attended a block party held in 2008 in celebration of the park.

== Sources ==
- Williams, Timothy (July 6, 2005). "Parks Even the Parks Dept. Won't Claim". The New York Times.
- Williams, Timothy (July 12, 2008). "Signs Of Life At Neglected Park". The New York Times.
- "University Woods". New York City Department of Parks and Recreation.
- "2006 Progress Report on Neighborhood Parks" (pdf). New Yorkers For Parks.
