= House concert =

Musical performance in a private residence

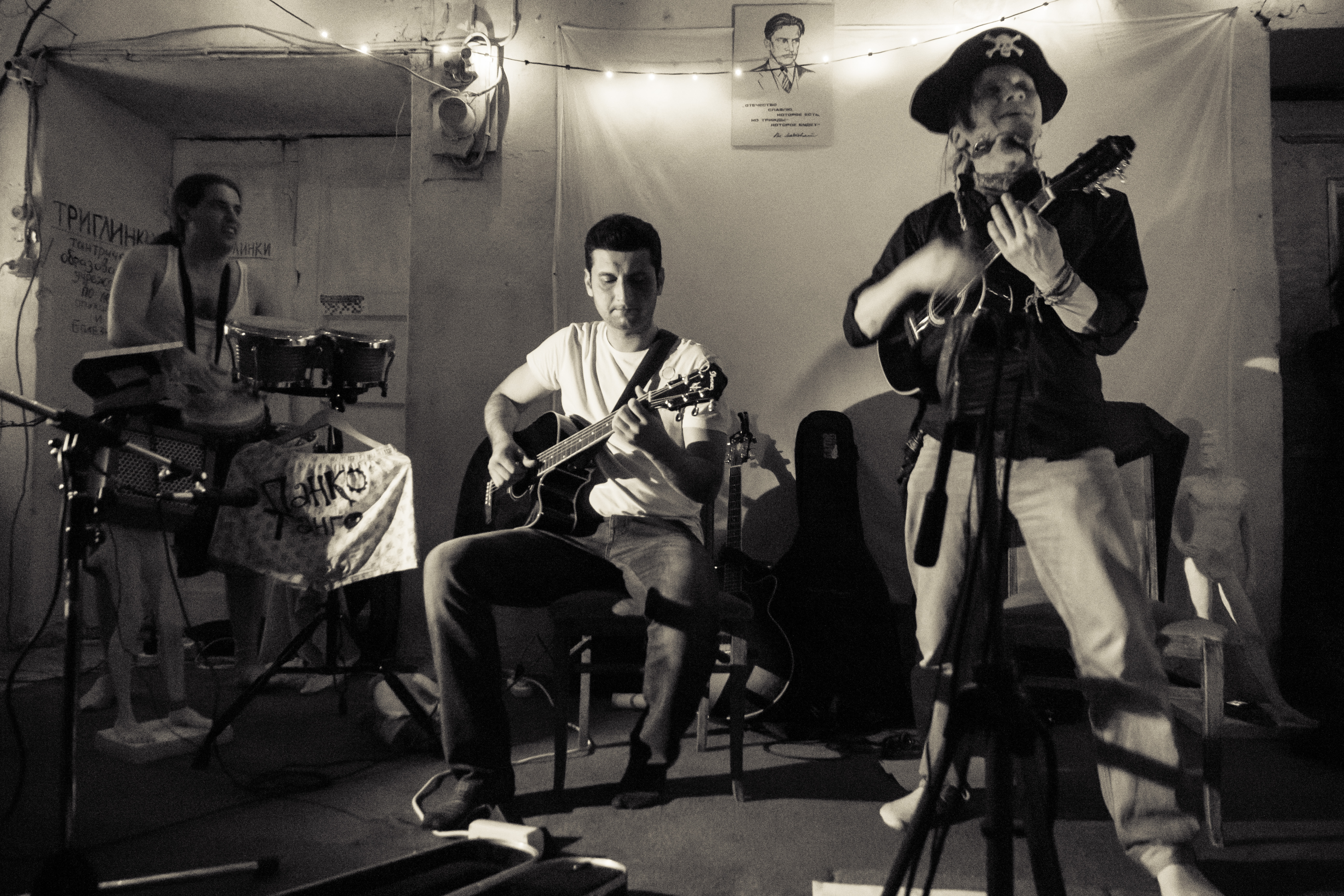
House concert by the band Panko Tango in Saint Petersburg, Russia

A house concert or home concert is a musical concert or performance art that is presented in someone's home or apartment, or a nearby small private space such as a barn, apartment rec room, lawn, or backyard.

Logistics considerations of holding a concert in a contemporary home include audience capacity, collecting cash or donations, whether the proceeds will be split with the host, marketing and whether to publicize the venue, the equipment or sound system, to provide refreshments or to hold a potluck, whether to have one show or present a series, and the choice of musicians.

Common in the historical past, but now unusual in the age of large concert arenas, a house concert is almost invariably described as an "intimate" experience. A true house concert needs to be distinguished from a smaller musical ensemble, recital at a high school, or modern chamber music concert, which may sometimes be called a "house show" or "house concert".

== Logistics ==
Audience capacity for a house concert is typically smaller than at a coffeehouse or club, but some concert spaces may accommodate 200 people; others can entertain two dozen or so.

Generally tickets are not sold in advance, but cash is collected at the show. Sometimes, the money collected goes straight to the performers, with no "profit motive" on the presenter's part. However, at other times, the purpose of the show is to collect money to pay for rent, or is paid by a donation. In fact, calling it a donation may prevent zoning issues that a host is operating a business such as a cabaret illegally or without a license.

Traditionally, there is little or no sound system, so performers may play and sing acoustically, or perform or act without a microphone. Since at least the 1970s, however, extension cords, mult boxes, and other equipment innovations have enabled such performers to hook into a sound system, either inside or outside a house. Nonetheless, the musicians "use just enough equipment to make for a complete experience without being too loud for the neighbors."

Refreshments, if any, are usually either a "pot luck" brought by the listeners, or provided by the hosts using a bit of the gate receipts. Sometimes, the performers get a meal and/or lodging with the presenters as part of their compensation.

Most house concerts are "one-shots", but others are presented as a series, for example, every two to eight weeks over a "season", of anywhere from six to twelve months. Some lesser-known musicians may go on tour with gigs consisting primarily of house concerts. Even notable musical acts, such as Sirsy, may schedule "private party" gigs while on tour.

== Promotion ==
House concerts are conducted "by invitation" (for practical reasons), social media such as Twitter or Facebook, or word of mouth, rather than as "public" concerts like a club or concert hall. However, in smaller towns and cities, the local media may help publicize such a concert. In an academic study on the cataloging of concert event ephemera, one of the only two flyers studied that did not have a publicized venue was for a house concert, the other being obscure.

== Experience ==
Now unusual in the age of large concert arenas, a house concert is almost invariably described as an "intimate" experience. In "a small setting as a house concert, [a singer] fills the air with her voice and [a musician] with his guitar. You are surrounded by the music." It is "up close and personal." The Wyldwood Shows, in Austin, Texas, can accommodate 200 people in a "lush backyard setting for what amounts to a near festival-like atmosphere."

A house concert is also a unique experience in the United States of 2010; one blogger at Wired magazine wrote:

I had never been to a house concert before, and wasn't sure what to expect. We RSVP'd to the proper email address, got the address and printed out directions. Marian was nice enough to let us show up an hour early to chat and feed her dinner. We visited for a while, and then other people started showing up. We knew no one, but most people there were pretty friendly. There were almost two dozen people by the time the concert began. ... All of [the songs] were better live than recorded. I have found that hearing music live gives you a whole new appreciation for the recorded versions. She would also add commentary and asides to many of the songs, which made them funnier and applicable to that particular concert. ... At the break, people paid their money, bought her CDs, and generally gushed about the concert. ... All in all, I would definitely go to a house concert again. Marian says she enjoys them the most, and I can see why. They bring people together for one night, often complete strangers, which can sometimes facilitate more lasting friendships. In addition, you get to hear live music and support the independent arts. Helping one person achieve success inspires others to take chances. Additionally, you can directly support the artist, instead of a venue taking a cut. I wish more musicians would do house concert tours.

— Jenny Williams, blogger for Wired

At house concerts, "you don't have worry about whether you'll have a good seat since the show is literally in the living room of the home ... at ... trailside Court, New City." This comes with a duty to recall "that this is a house concert, so behave accordingly and don't do anything you wouldn't do in your own house, OK?"

People host house concerts because they "want to share great music," or they may live in a town where "there are too few venues where people can go to experience great music in a close and friendly environment." One may also wish to host a home concert because it makes one happy, or "to give exposure to some incredible musicians whose talents [they] truly believe in and wish to help promote." A retired musician may be a host as "one way of reconnecting with that part of themselves."

Enjoyment of house concerts spans age groups, and includes younger kids and teenagers:

Yet recently I played a house concert for a high school graduation party. The 18-year-olds sat in silence for two hours, and at the end bought my CD. This was just an average bunch of Vermont kids, hanging out, grooving to some music. I just want to sing, and if these kids are any indication, I have a sneaking suspicion that they just want to listen.

— Myra Flynn, singer

Folk music singer-songwriter Carrie Elkin says of house concerts:

... they are the bread and butter of our existence because so many of the Cactus Cafe type venues have closed. If you want to go on tour and play every night, the house concerts can fill up the whole [run]. We're really lucky. It's so refreshing to go to a venue and get a home cooked meal. The idea has also taken off in England. It's not that big but we've done a few there. You learn so much more about a place, much more than just showing up at a club and playing.

In the Seoul, South Korea, "The House Concert" series, the audience sits directly on the wooden floor along with the musicians so they can feel the vibration of the instruments, providing an even more intimate and "goose-bump" inspiring connection to the music and the performers. "The House Concert" organizer explains:

There is a world of difference between experiencing the vibration on your body and not. Once you know the feeling, you tend to get addicted to it. I can even say you might not be able to enjoy other concerts.

— Park Chang-soo, pianist and "The House Concert" organizer

== History ==
House concerts are not new, yet have had a recent resurgence in the late 20th and early 21st centuries.

=== Precursors ===
Folk music, country music, and blues music have long histories of performances at people's homes and backyards. Most people's only experience of music was house concerts:

Listening to live music is something that used to be ubiquitous in our culture, before recorded music was widespread. Concerts were attended, balls were held and there was usually at least one person in each family who knew how to play an instrument.

— Jenny Williams, blogger for Wired

Early music was performed commonly as "house concerts"; even Mozart used the format. The lute, an instrument with a "treasure house of music", works best in very small concerts of early music: "The lute is not very loud, and so is not a candidate for Carnegie Hall. It is an intimate instrument, perfect for the player himself, or for a very few listeners. ... "

In the period of the Renaissance and Baroque, especially in the 16th century, all secular music was performed in a chamber of the nobleman's home, and thus called chamber music. Only in the 17th century did it come to mean either secular or religious music, and only in the time of Beethoven and later were halls built specifically for public concerts. Even into the 20th century, chamber music was performed in home concerts. Ralph Kirkpatrick recalled playing a clavichord at a house concert in Hamburg, Germany after 1929.

From the mid-19th century until the mid-20th century, many wealthy individuals had pipe organs installed in their homes. Prior to the advent of recorded music, the organ was the only instrument able to provide a real approximation of orchestral music under the control of one performer, with sufficient volume to entertain a group of people. In Great Britain and Europe, and especially in America, a wealthy person's home was not considered complete without a pipe organ. The AEolian Organ Company in particular catered almost exclusively to this clientele. Many house organs were of modest size, with two manuals and 10 to 20 stops; however, the homes of the richest had organs that rivaled a cathedral organ in size. While many home organs began to have automatic player mechanisms (operating in a manner similar to the player piano roll system) from the 1890s, the highest artistic standard was, of course, a live performer. Members of the upper-class families, such as the Vanderbilts, Carnegies, Mellons, and Schwab had house concerts regularly for their friends to hear a performance by a noted artist on their pipe organ. Dependent on the taste of the host, these house concerts generally included very little "legitimate" organ music, and consisted mainly of arrangements of popular tunes, operatic overtures, and transcriptions of orchestral works. Several prominent organists such as Archer Gibson worked almost exclusively playing house parties.

On December 6, 1897, Norwegian romantic composer Edvard Grieg and his wife Nina Grieg, a lyric soprano, performed some of his music at a private concert at Windsor Castle for Queen Victoria and her court; she later hosted Pablo Casals and the Carl Rosa company.

House concerts have been attested since at least the early 20th century in New York City. In the 1930s Harlem, people rented out "buffet flats" (an apartment room set aside for travellers or shows) for blues concerts or risque performances. At a particularly "open house" of a sex show, Ruby Smith said, "People used to pay good just to go in there and see him do his act."(sic.) An obese African-American female impersonator did her drag show at a buffet flat at 101 W. 140th Street. The elite of Harlem "called on the police to close the brothels and buffet flats. ... " that were using such home concerts as covers for illicit sex.

In 1957, short story writer Walter Ballenger described a house concert for students in Chicago.

=== Soviet Union and post-Soviet Russia ===
In the Soviet Union, a form of house concert known as a kvartirnik (Russian: квартирник, from kvartira, meaning "apartment") became associated with the informal performance of author's song and, later, rock music. Apartment performances by singer-songwriters such as Bulat Okudzhava, Alexander Galich and Vladimir Vysotsky preceded the rock concerts that became prominent in unofficial musical circles during the 1970s and 1980s. Such events offered musicians opportunities to perform for small audiences outside conventional state concert institutions.

The limited space of apartments often favoured acoustic performances and direct exchanges between musicians and listeners. Some concerts were recorded on tape, and copies circulated through magnitizdat, an unofficial network for duplicating and sharing audio recordings; musicologist J. Martin Daughtry describes recordings of Okudzhava's performances made in Moscow and Leningrad apartments. Apartment concerts continued after the dissolution of the Soviet Union, while some later concerts in clubs and on television adopted the name and informal aesthetic of the kvartirnik without taking place in private homes.

=== Hip hop music ===
DJ Kool Herc is credited with helping to start hip hop and rap music at a house concert at an apartment building in the South Bronx. The Bronx's evolution from a hot bed of Latin jazz to an incubator of Hip hop was the subject of an award-winning documentary, produced by City Lore and broadcast on PBS in 2006, "From Mambo to Hip Hop: A South Bronx Tale". Hip Hop first emerged in the South Bronx in the early 1970s. The New York Times has identified 1520 Sedgwick Avenue "an otherwise unremarkable high-rise just north of the Cross Bronx Expressway and hard along the Major Deegan Expressway" as a starting point, where DJ Kool Herc presided over parties in the community room.

On August 11, 1973, DJ Kool Herc was a Dee Jay and Emcee at a party in the recreation room of 1520 Sedgwick Avenue in the Bronx adjacent to the Cross-Bronx Expressway. It was not the actual "Birthplace of Hip Hop"—the genre developed slowly in several places in the 1970s—but was verified to be the place where one of the pivotal and formative events occurred. Specifically, DJ Kool Herc:

extended an instrumental beat (breaking or scratching) to let people dance longer (break dancing) and began MC'ing (rapping) during the extended breakdancing. ... [This] helped lay the foundation for a cultural revolution.

— History Detectives

=== Punk rock ===
Basement shows are common within the North American punk rock scene.

=== House music ===
"House music" may, or may not, have anything to do with house concerts; there is considerable dispute whether the term used for that genre comes from a particular venue (the Warehouse, or House for short), a DJ who invented it at his mother's house concerts, or a club's own trademark style.

That term may have its origin from a Chicago nightclub called The Warehouse which existed from 1977 to 1982, and which was patronized primarily by gay black and Latino men. The disco music played by the club's resident DJ, Frankie Knuckles, said in the Channel 4 documentary Pump Up The Volume, that the first time he heard the term "house music" was upon seeing "we play house music" on a sign in the window of a bar on Chicago's South Side. Chip E.'s 1985 recording "It's House" may also have helped to define this new form of electronic music. Chip E. lent credence to the Knuckles association, claiming the name came from methods of labelling records at the Importes Etc. record store, where he worked in the early 1980s: bins of music that DJ Knuckles played at the Warehouse nightclub was labelled in the store "As Heard At The Warehouse", which was shortened to simply "House".

Another South-Side Chicago DJ, Leonard "Remix" Rroy, in self-published statements, claims he put such a sign in a tavern window because it was where he played music that one might find in one's home or house; in his case, it referred to his mother's soul and disco records, which he worked into his sets.

Juan Atkins, an originator of Detroit techno music, claims the term "house" reflected the exclusive association of particular tracks with particular DJs; those tracks were their "house" records (much like a restaurant might have a "house" salad dressing).

=== Recent uses ===
Recently, Larry Lyon's Americana Unplugged established a house concert-type venue in downtown Davis, Oklahoma featuring folk and Americana musicians from across the globe. House concerts are now held across the United States, especially California, Texas, Brooklyn, New York, and Boston, Massachusetts. There have been house concerts across America, in such places as Springfield, Ohio, Bozeman, Montana, outside Phoenix, Arizona, Vermont, Sisters, Oregon (near Bend, Oregon), New City, New York, and Covington, Georgia.

More recently, they have been reported in many places around the world, from Canada, to South Korea, India and Brazil.

A house concert can be a useful step for curing a musician's "performance anxiety", also known as "stage fright":

I ask the client to set up some performance during the course of the treatment if she doesn't have any already scheduled. There is really no other way to measure change than to get the musician out in the world performing. A "test performance" may be as simple as a house concert in front of friends or a more formal public program. I attend programs (not house recitals) if I believe my attendance will help the client and she wants me to be there.

— Charles D. Plummer

Bruce Watson, who has been called "an icon of the Australian folk scene", has performed extensively at house concerts throughout Australia and New Zealand.

== See also ==
- Basement show
- Garage rock
