= Bronx Community Board 5 =

Bronx Community District 5 Bronx Community Board 5
- Community District
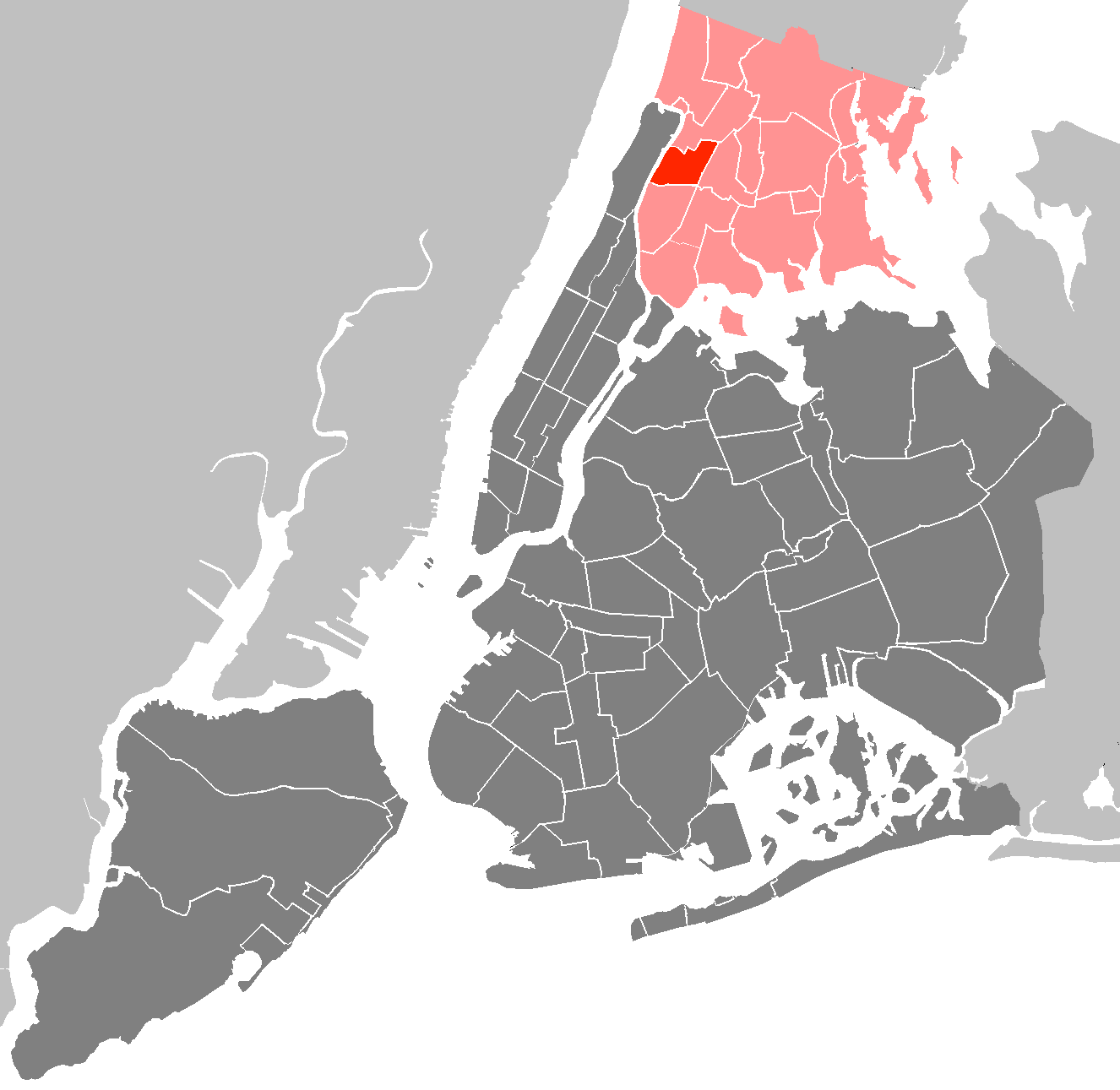
- Location in the Bronx
- Country: United States
- State: New York
- City: New York City
- Borough: The Bronx
- Neighborhoods: list: Fordham; Morris Heights; Mount Hope; University Heights

Government
  - Type: Community board
  - Body: Bronx Community Board 5
  - Chairperson: Osiris Guzman
  - District Manager: Ken Brown

Area
  - Total: 1.4 sq mi (3.6 km^{2})

Population (2017)
  - Total: 140,300
  - Density: 100,000/sq mi (39,000/km^{2})

Ethnicity
  - Hispanic and Latino Americans: 68.4%
  - African-American: 27.5%
  - White: 1.2%
  - Asian: 1.7%
  - Others: 1.1%
- Time zone: UTC−5 (Eastern)
  - Summer (DST): UTC−4 (EDT)
- ZIP codes: 10452, 10453, 10457, 10458, and 10468
- Area codes: 718, 347, and 929, and 917
- Police Precincts: 46th (website)
- Website: www1.nyc.gov/site/bronxcb5/index.page

Bronx Community Board 5 is a local government unit of the city of New York, encompassing the neighborhoods of Fordham, Morris Heights, Mount Hope, and University Heights. It is delimited by Webster Avenue to the east, Hall of Fame Terrace, West 183rd Street, and Fordham Road to the north, the Harlem River to the west, and Washington Bridge and the Cross Bronx Expressway to the south.

Its current chairperson is Angel Caballero, and its district manager Ken Brown.

== Demographics ==
As of the United States 2000 Census, the Community Board has a population of 128,313, up from 118,435 in 1990 and 107,997 in 1980. Of them, 79,048 (61.6%) are of Hispanic origin, 41,609 (32.4%) are Black, non-Hispanic, 1,917 (1.5%) are White, non-Hispanic, 2,071 (1.6%) are Asian or Pacific Islander, 453 (0.4%) American Indian or Alaska Native, 978 (0.8%) are some other race (non-Hispanic), and 2,237 (1.7%) of two or more races (non-Hispanic).
