= Morris Heights, Bronx =

Neighborhood in New York City

Morris Heights
- Neighborhood of the Bronx
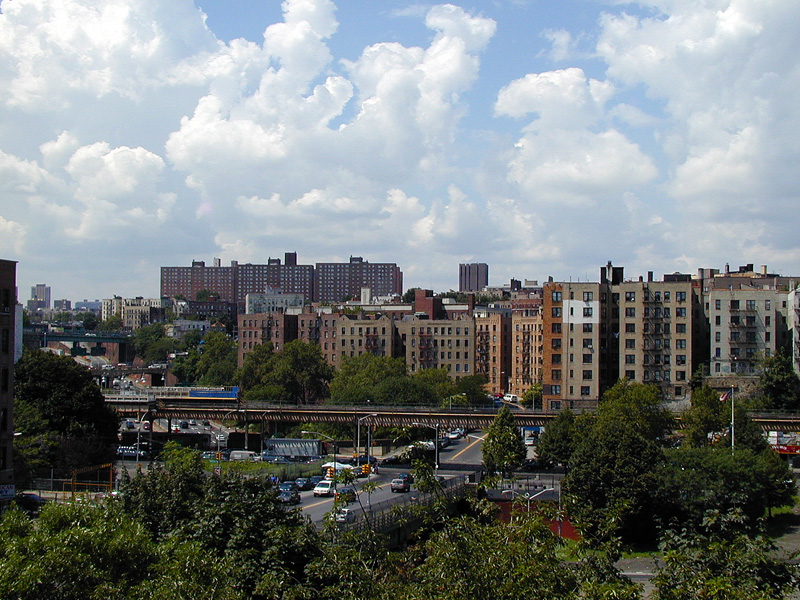
- Featherbed Lane, seen from Grand Concourse
- Interactive map of Morris Heights
- Coordinates: 40.85°N 73.92°W
- Country: United States
- State: New York
- City: New York City
- Borough: The Bronx
- Community District: Bronx 5

Area
  - Total: 0.502 sq mi (1.30 km^{2})

Population (2011)
  - Total: 36,779
  - Density: 73,300/sq mi (28,300/km^{2})

Economics
  - Median income: $24,850
- Time zone: UTC−05:00 (Eastern (EST))
  - Summer (DST): UTC−04:00 (Eastern (EDT))
- ZIP Codes: 10452–10453
- Area code: 718, 347, 929, and 917
- Website: morrisheights.nyc

Morris Heights is a residential neighborhood located in the West Bronx. Its boundaries, starting from the north and moving clockwise are: West Burnside Avenue to the north, Jerome Avenue to the east, the Cross Bronx Expressway to the south, and the Harlem River to the west. University Avenue is the primary thoroughfare through Morris Heights.

The neighborhood is part of Bronx Community Board 5, and its ZIP Codes include 10452 and 10453. The area is patrolled by the New York City Police Department's 46th Precinct. New York City Housing Authority (NYCHA) property in the area is patrolled by P.S.A. 7 at 737 Melrose Avenue in the Melrose section of the Bronx.

== History ==
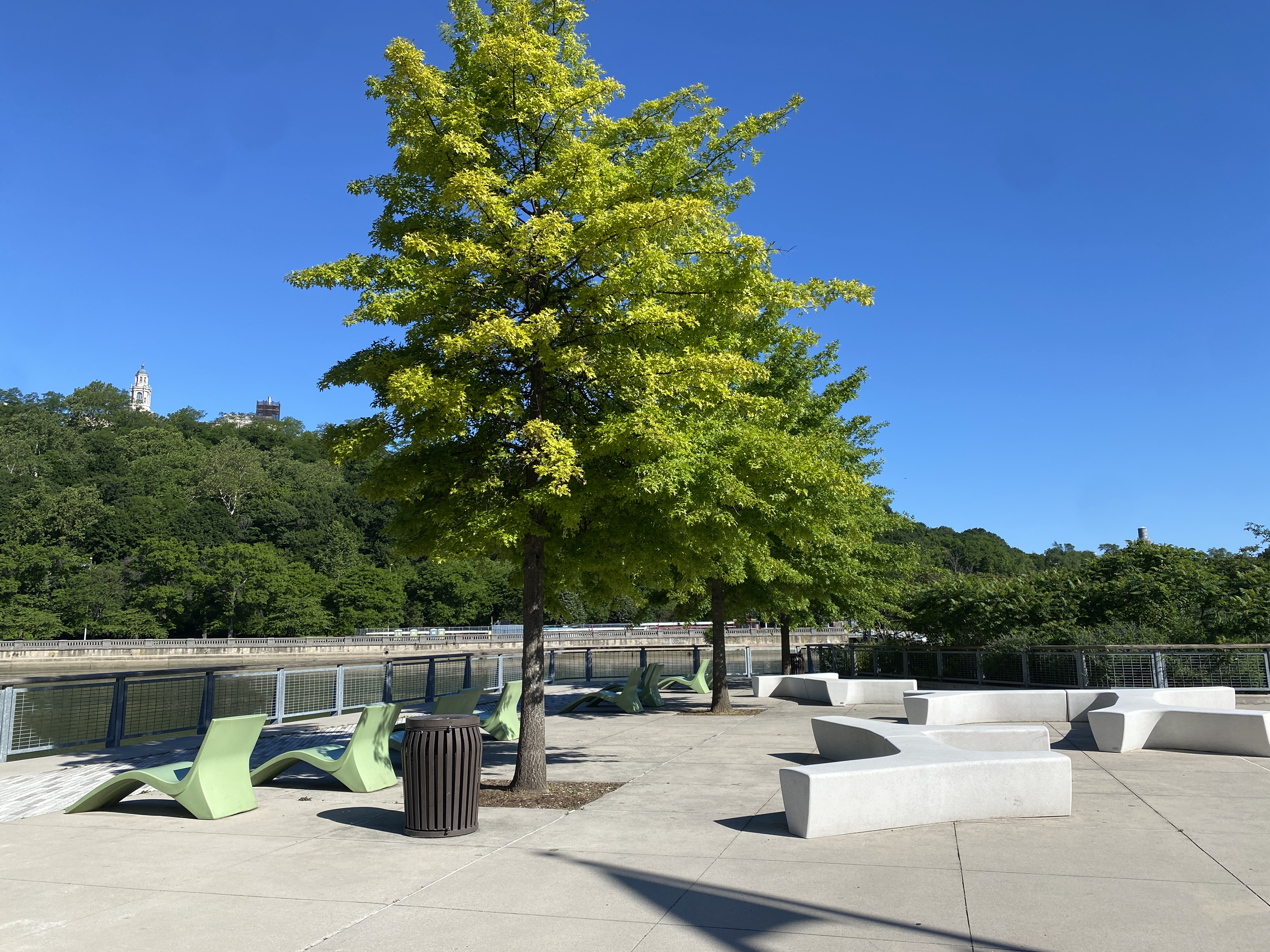
Roberto Clemente State Park

Morris Heights was formerly the home of the Gas Engine & Power Company & Charles L. Seabury Company, a shipbuilding firm located on Mathewson Road near what is today the location of Roberto Clemente State Park. Founded in 1896 by the merger of the formerly separate Gas Engine & Power Company & Charles L. Seabury Company, the firm operated along Morris Heights' waterfront until it moved to City Island following World War II.

After a wave of arson ravaged the low-income communities of New York City throughout the 1970s, many if not most residential structures in Morris Heights were left seriously damaged or destroyed. The city began to rehabilitate many formerly abandoned tenement-style apartment buildings and designate them low-income housing beginning in the late 1970s. Also, many subsidized attached multi-unit townhouses and newly constructed apartment buildings have been or are being built on vacant lots across the neighborhood.

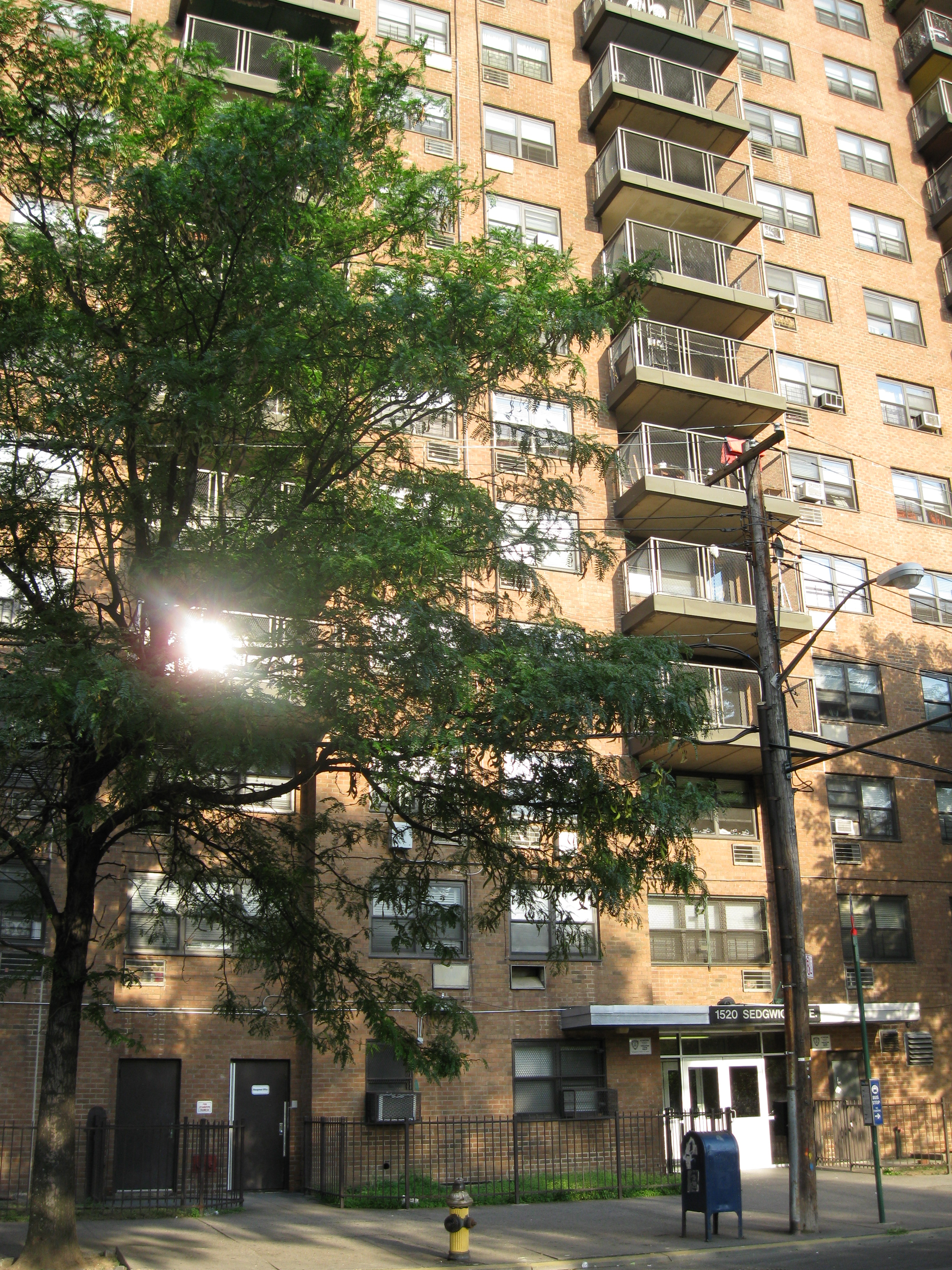
1520 Sedgwick Avenue, considered the birthplace of hip hop

Morris Heights is believed to be the site where Hip Hop culture originated in the 1970s. However, in the late 1960s and early 1970s, several disc jockeys protected by the Black Spades (a violent predominantly African-American orgatnized street gang that promoted their own form of justice; originally from Bronxdale Housing Projects and later recruited several members from Bronx River Housing Projects), and other gangs took their DJ-led block parties in the South Bronx, the East Side of the Bronx, and the West Side.

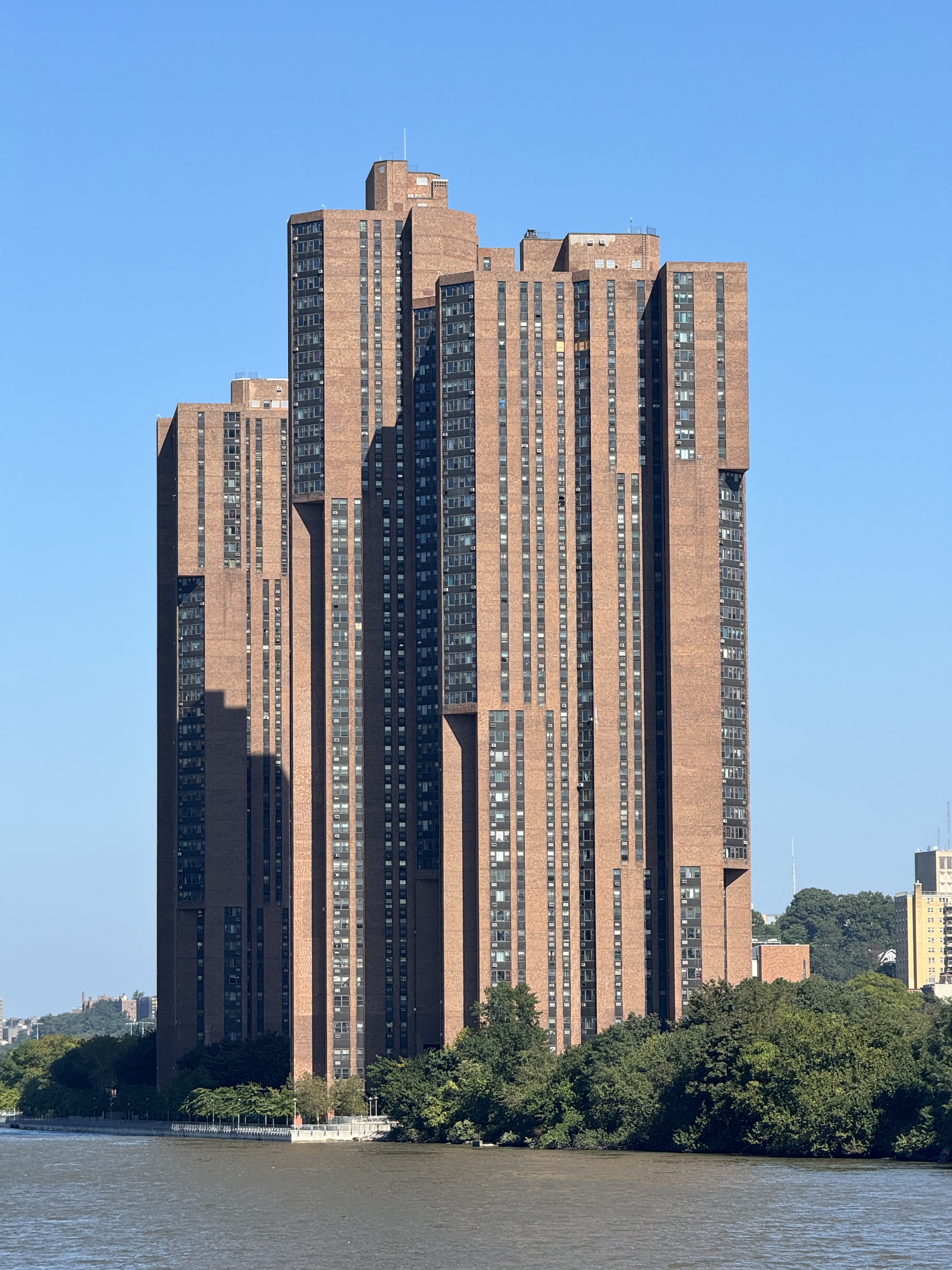
River Park Towers

River Park Towers or the Harlem River Park Towers are two 38-story, and two 44-story residential buildings in the Morris Heights neighborhood . Completed in 1975, they became the tallest buildings in the borough, ahead of Tracey Towers and the multiple high-rises encompassing Co-op City. Currently, no other building in the Bronx has exceeded this height.

== Demographics ==
Morris Heights has a population of around 36,779. Almost half the population lives below the poverty line and receives public assistance (TANF, Home Relief, Supplemental Security Income, and Medicaid). The vast majority of residents in the area are of Hispanic or African American descent. The majority of households are renter- occupied.

Based on data from the 2010 U.S. census, the population of University Heights and Morris Heights was 54,188, a change of -147 (-0.3%) from the 54,335 counted in 2000. Covering an area of 484.32 acres (196.00 ha), the neighborhood had a population density of 111.9 inhabitants per acre (71,600/sq mi; 27,700/km^{2}). The racial makeup of the neighborhood was 1.4% (760) White, 31.8% (17,219) African American, 0.2% (106) Native American, 1.3% (688) Asian, 0% (11) Pacific Islander, 0.3% (158) from other races, and 0.8% (424) from two or more races. Hispanic or Latino of any race were 64.3% (34,822) of the population.

The entirety of Community District 5, which comprises Morris Heights, University Heights, and Fordham, had 136,151 inhabitants as of NYC Health's 2018 Community Health Profile, with an average life expectancy of 79.9 years. This is lower than the median life expectancy of 81.2 for all New York City neighborhoods. Most inhabitants are youth and middle-aged adults: 28% are between the ages of between 0–17, 29% between 25 and 44, and 23% between 45 and 64. The ratio of college-aged and elderly residents was lower, at 12% and 8% respectively.

As of 2017, the median household income in Community District 5 was $30,166. In 2018, an estimated 34% of Morris Heights and Fordham residents lived in poverty, compared to 25% in all of the Bronx and 20% in all of New York City. One in eight residents (13%) were unemployed, compared to 13% in the Bronx and 9% in New York City. Rent burden, or the percentage of residents who have difficulty paying their rent, is 65% in Morris Heights and Fordham, compared to the boroughwide and citywide rates of 58% and 51% respectively. Based on this calculation, as of 2018, Morris Heights and Fordham were considered low-income relative to the rest of the city and not gentrifying.

== Land use and terrain ==
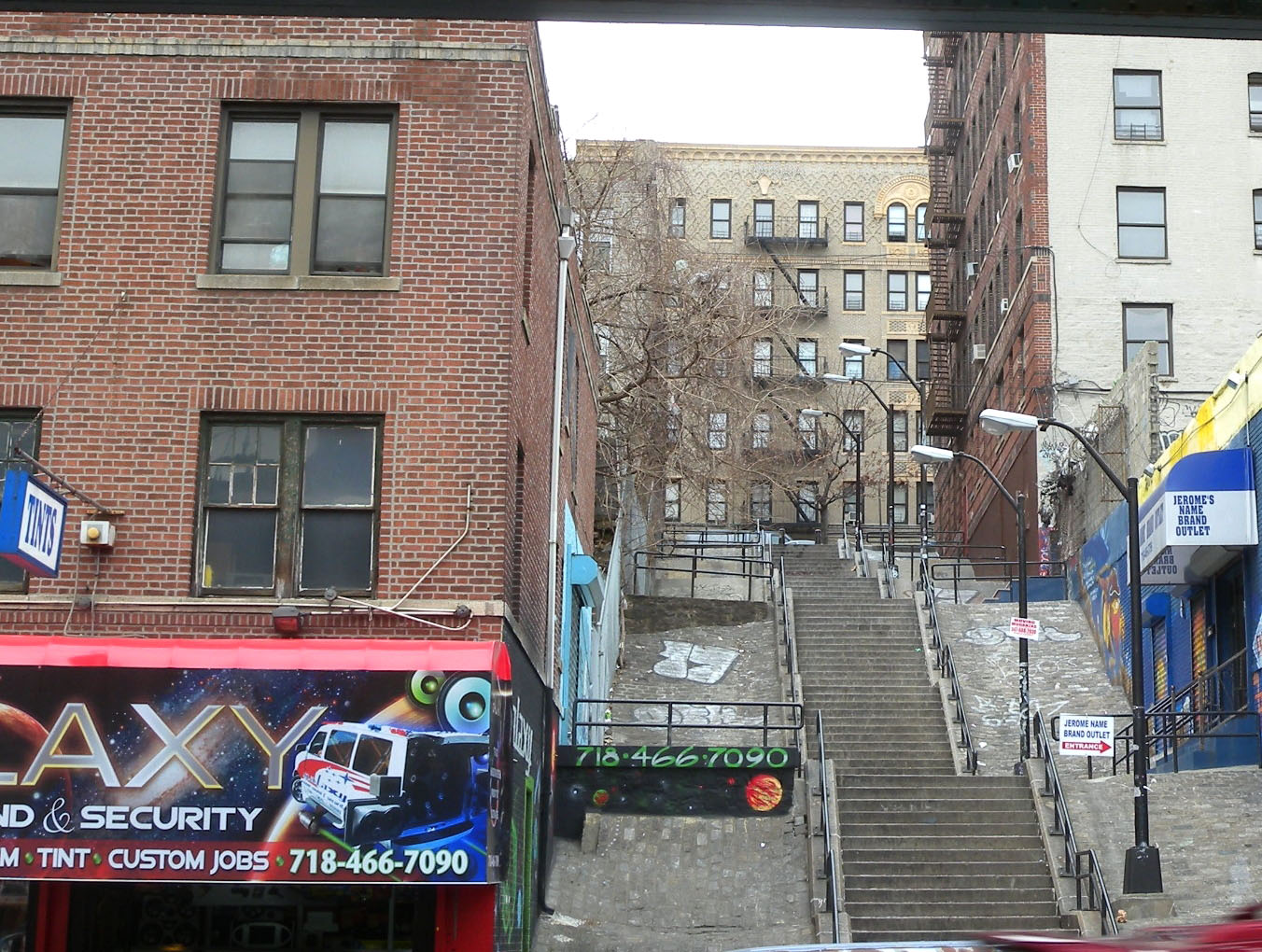
Clifford Place, a step street

Morris Heights is dominated by five- and six-story tenement buildings, older multi-unit homes, vacant lots, newly constructed subsidized attached multi-unit townhouses, and apartment buildings. A significant percentage of the early 20th-century housing stock was structurally damaged by arson and eventually razed by the city. The total land area is less than half one square mile. The terrain is elevated and consists of many hills. Step streets connect areas located at different elevations.

=== Low-income public housing projects ===
Ten New York City Housing Authority (NYCHA) developments are located in Morris Heights.

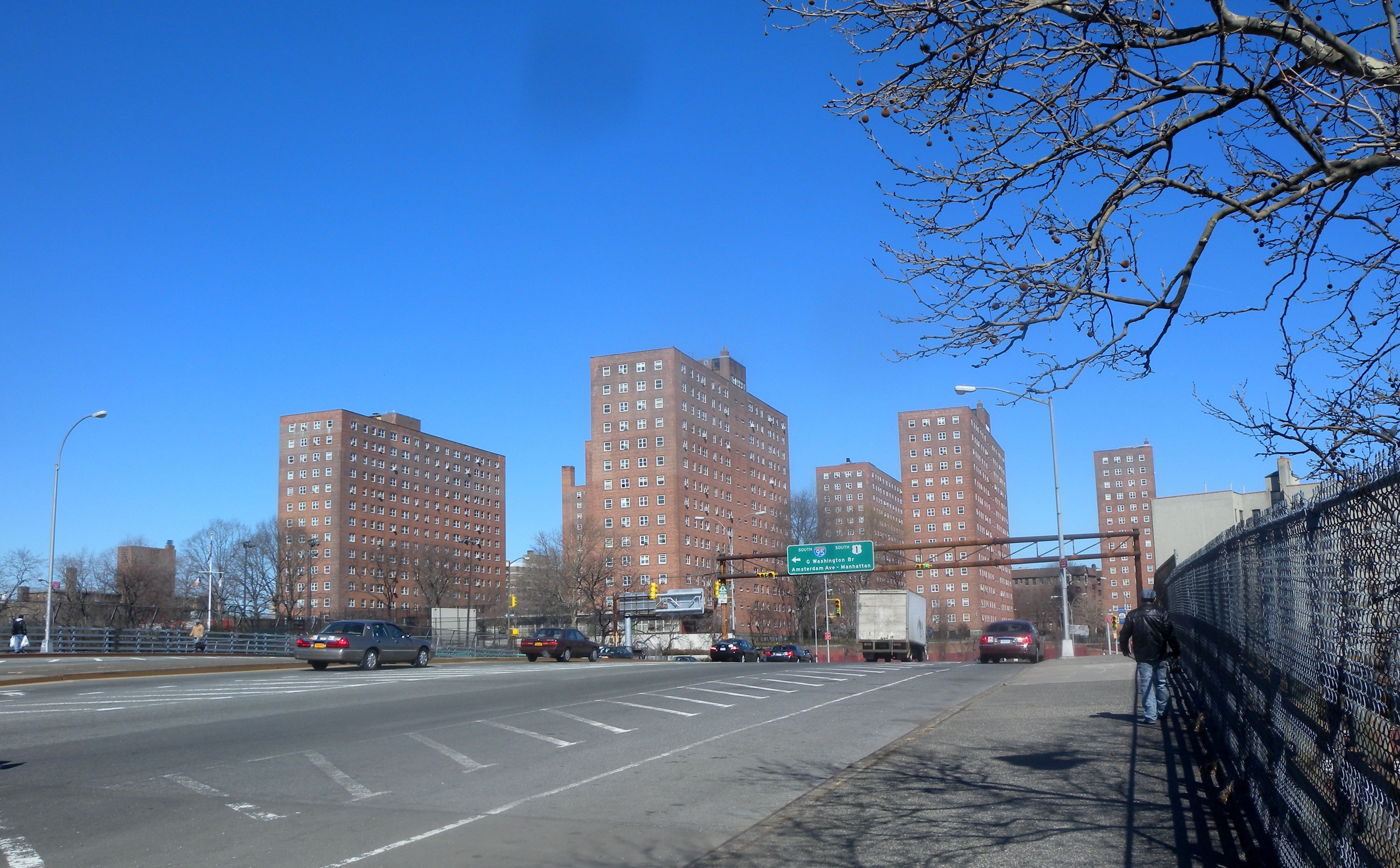
Sedgwick Houses

1. Harrison Avenue Rehab (Group A); one five-story rehabilitated tenement building.
2. Harrison Avenue Rehab (Group B); four rehabilitated buildings, five and six stories tall.
3. Macombs Road; two rehabilitated buildings, five and six stories tall.
4. Morris Heights Rehab; three rehabilitated tenement buildings, five and six stories tall
5. Sedgwick Houses; seven buildings, 14 and 16 stories tall.
6. University Avenue Rehab; four six-story rehabilitated tenement buildings.
7. West Tremont Avenue-Sedgwick Avenue Area; one 12-story building.
8. West Tremont Rehab (Group 1); two rehabilitated tenement buildings, five and six stories tall.
9. West Tremont Rehab (Group 3); one five-story rehabilitated tenement building.
10. West Tremont Rehab (Group 2); two six-story rehabilitated tenement buildings.

== Police and crime ==
Morris Heights and Fordham are patrolled by the 46th Precinct of the NYPD, located at 2120 Ryer Avenue. The 46th Precinct ranked 27th-safest out of 69 patrol areas for per-capita crime in 2010. As of 2018, with a non-fatal assault rate of 126 per 100,000 people, Morris Heights and Fordham's rate of violent crimes per capita was greater than that of the city as a whole. The incarceration rate of 1,033 per 100,000 people was higher than that of the city as a whole.

The 46th Precinct has a lower crime rate than in the 1990s, with crimes across all categories having decreased by 71.3% between 1990 and 2025. The precinct reported 7 murders, 34 rapes, 365 robberies, 756 felony assaults, 175 burglaries, 567 grand larcenies, and 216 grand larcenies auto in 2025.

== Fire safety ==
Morris Heights is served by the New York City Fire Department (FDNY)'s Engine Co. 43/Ladder Co. 59 fire station, located at 1901 Sedgwick Avenue.

== Health ==
As of 2018, preterm births and births to teenage mothers were more common in Morris Heights and Fordham than in other places citywide. In Morris Heights and Fordham, there were 93 preterm births per 1,000 live births (compared to 87 per 1,000 citywide), and 35.3 births to teenage mothers per 1,000 live births (compared to 19.3 per 1,000 citywide). Morris Heights and Fordham has a relatively average population of residents who are uninsured. In 2018, this population of uninsured residents was estimated to be 14%, higher than the citywide rate of 12%.

The concentration of fine particulate matter, the deadliest type of air pollutant, in Morris Heights and Fordham is 0.0083 milligrams per cubic metre (8.3×10^{−9} oz/ft^{3}), more than the city average. Sixteen percent of Morris Heights and Fordham residents are smokers, which is higher than the city average of 14% of residents being smokers. In Morris Heights and Fordham, 34% of residents are obese, 16% are diabetic, and 27% have high blood pressure—compared to the citywide averages of 24%, 11%, and 28% respectively. In addition, 24% of children are obese, compared to the citywide average of 20%.

Seventy-eight percent of residents eat some fruits and vegetables every day, which is less than the city's average of 87%. In 2018, 67% of residents described their health as "good", "very good", or "excellent", lower than the city's average of 78%. For every supermarket in Morris Heights and Fordham, there are 20 bodegas.

The nearest hospitals are Bronx-Lebanon Hospital Center in Claremont, James J. Peters VA Medical Center in Kingsbridge Heights, and St Barnabas Hospital in Belmont. Morris Heights Health Center also provides health services in the area.

== Politics ==
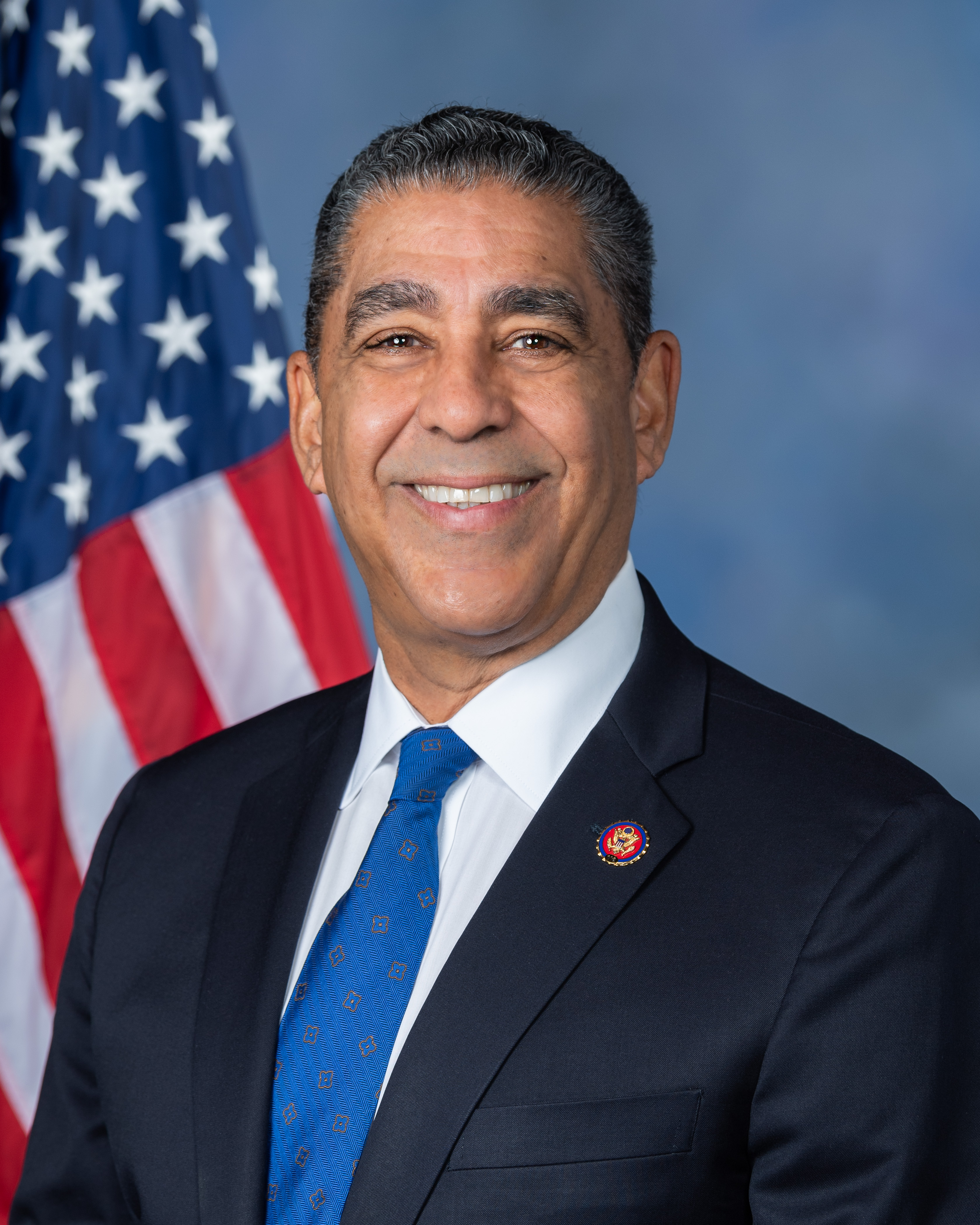
Adriano Espaillat

Politically, Washington Heights is in New York's 13th congressional district for the U.S. House of Representatives represented by Democrat Adriano Espaillat since 2017. On the state level, it is also part of the State Senate 33rd District represented by Gustavo Rivera and State Senate 29th District represented by José M. Serrano, and in the State Assembly 86th District it is represented by Yudelka Tapia. On the city level, the neighborhood is part of the New York City Council 14th district. represented by Pierina Sanchez .

== Post offices and ZIP Codes ==
Morris Heights is covered by ZIP Codes 10453 and 10452. The United States Postal Service operates two post offices nearby: the Morris Heights Station at 2024 Jerome Avenue and the University Heights Station at 1541 Shakespeare Avenue.

== Education ==
Morris Heights and Fordham generally had a lower rate of college-educated residents than the rest of the city as of 2018. While 10% of residents age 25 and older had a college education or higher, 34% had less than a high school education and 46% were high school graduates or had some college education. By contrast, 26% of Bronx residents and 43% of city residents had a college education or higher. The percentage of Morris Heights and Fordham students excelling in math rose from 19% in 2000 to 43% in 2011, and reading achievement increased from 24% to 28% during the same time period.

Morris Heights and Fordham's rate of elementary school student absenteeism was more than the rest of New York City. In Morris Heights and Fordham, 30% of elementary school students missed 20 or more days per school year, higher than the citywide average of 20%. Additionally, 66% of high school students in Morris Heights and Fordham graduated on time, lower than the citywide average of 75%.

=== Schools ===
Public schools include:

- PS 109 (Popham Avenue and West Tremont Avenue)
- PS 204: Morris Heights (Dr. Martin Luther King Jr. Blvd. and West Tremont Avenue)
- PS 226: (Sedgwick Ave and Burnside Ave)
- PS 274/IS 229: Roland N. Patterson (Harlem River Park Bridge and Sedgwick Avenue)
- PS 306 (West Tremont and Jerome Avenues)
- PS 396/MS 390 (West Burnside and Andrews Avenues)
- IS 303: The Leadership and Community Service Academy (West 176th Street and Macombs Road)
- MS 232: The Academy School (West 176th Street and Macombs Road)
- MS 331: The Bronx School of Young Leaders (West Tremont and Davidson Avenue)
- HS 365: The Academy for Language and Technology High School (West 176th Street and Macombs Road)

=== Library ===
The New York Public Library (NYPL) operates the Sedgwick branch at 1701 Martin Luther King Jr. Boulevard. The branch first opened in the Sedgwick Houses in 1951 before moving to its present two-story building in 1994.

== Transportation ==
The following MTA Regional Bus Operations bus routes serve Morris Heights:

- Bx3: to 238th Street station (1 train) or George Washington Bridge Bus Terminal (via University Avenue)
- Bx18: to 170th Street station (B and D trains) (loop, via Macombs Road)
- Bx32: to VA Hospital or Third Avenue–138th Street station (6 and <6> trains, via Morris Avenue)
- Bx36: to Castle Hill or George Washington Bridge Bus Terminal (via Tremont Avenue)
- Bx40: to SUNY Maritime College or River Park Towers (via 180th Street, Tremont and Burnside Avenues)
- Bx42: to Throggs Neck or River Park Towers (via 180th Street, Tremont and Burnside Avenues)

The following New York City Subway stations serve Morris Heights:

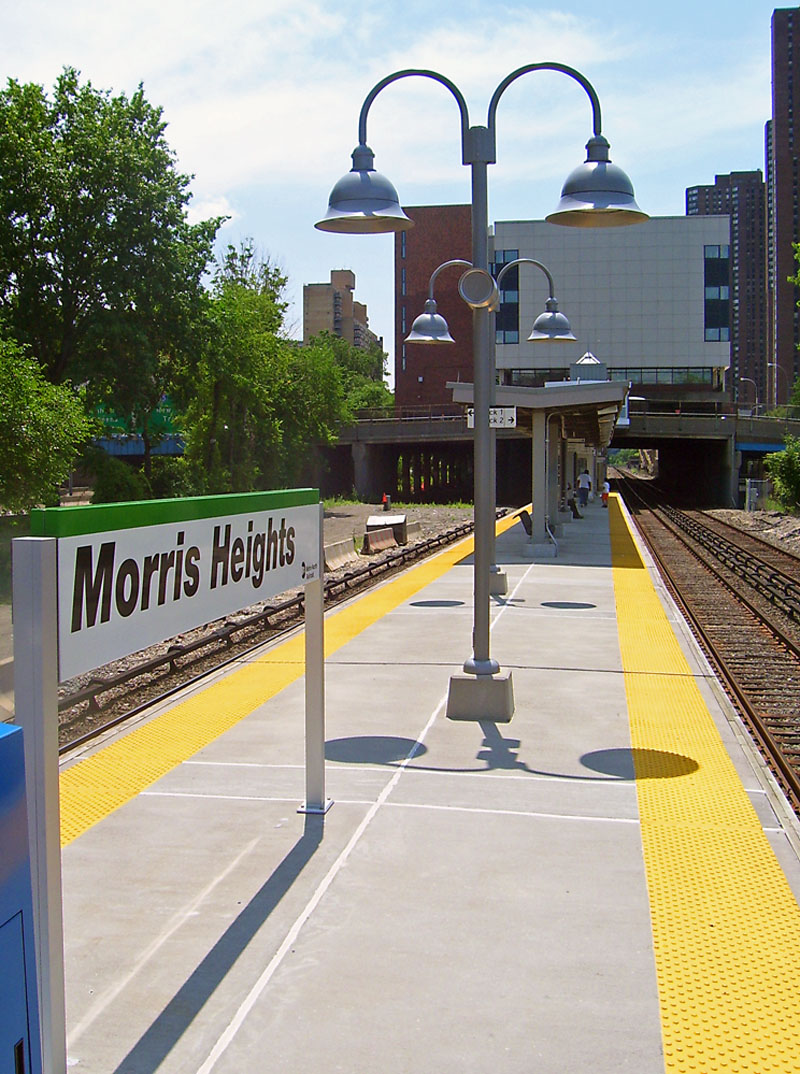
Metro-North's Morris Heights station

- 170th Street (4 train)
- Mount Eden Avenue (4 train)
- 176th Street (4 train)
- Burnside Avenue (4 train)
- 170th Street (B and D trains)
- 174th–175th Streets (B and D trains)
- Tremont Avenue (B and D trains)

The Metro-North Railroad's Hudson Line also serves Morris Heights via the Morris Heights station.

== Notable residents ==
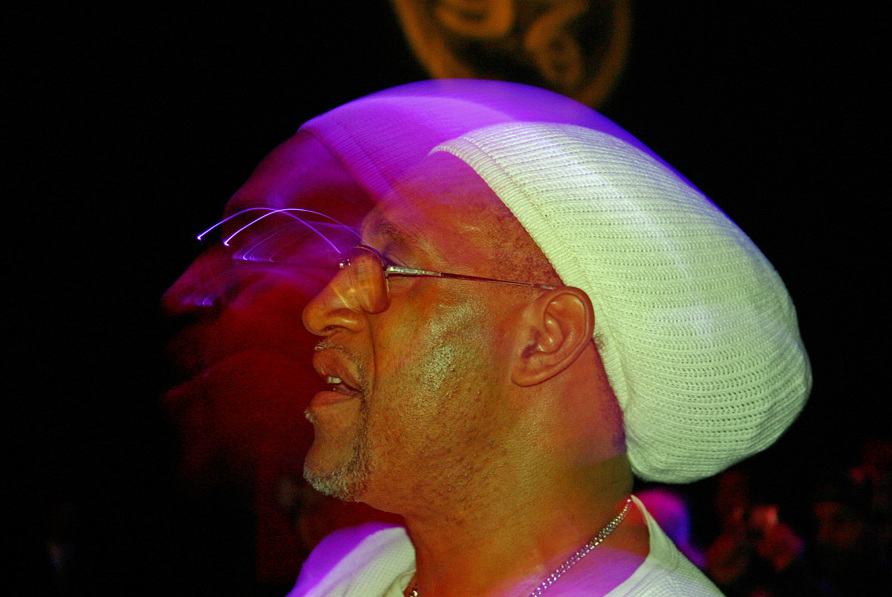
DJ Kool Herc

- DJ Kool Herc (born1955), Jamaican-American DJ, pioneer of hip-hop music
- Lewis Gouverneur Morris (1808–1900), maritime advocate and sheep and cattle breeder
- Robert Price (1932–2016), attorney, investment banker and corporate executive
- Scott La Rock (1962–1987), hip-hop disc jockey and music producer
- Stanley Simon (1930–2023), lawyer and politician
