= Basement show =

Type of musical performance

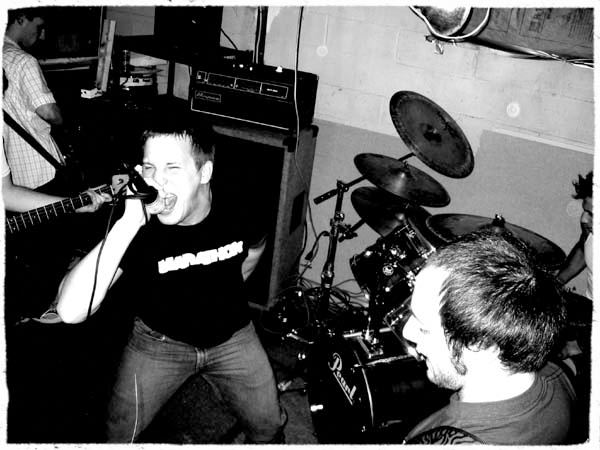
Walk The Line was a Syracuse, NY based hardcore punk band from 2003 to 2006. This picture was from a New Year's Eve basement show.

A basement show is a musical performance, often of the punk rock or hardcore punk variety, that is held in the basement of a residential home, rather than at a traditional venue. These are also sometimes referred to as house shows as they can happen anywhere in a residential house, not just in the basement.

== Background ==
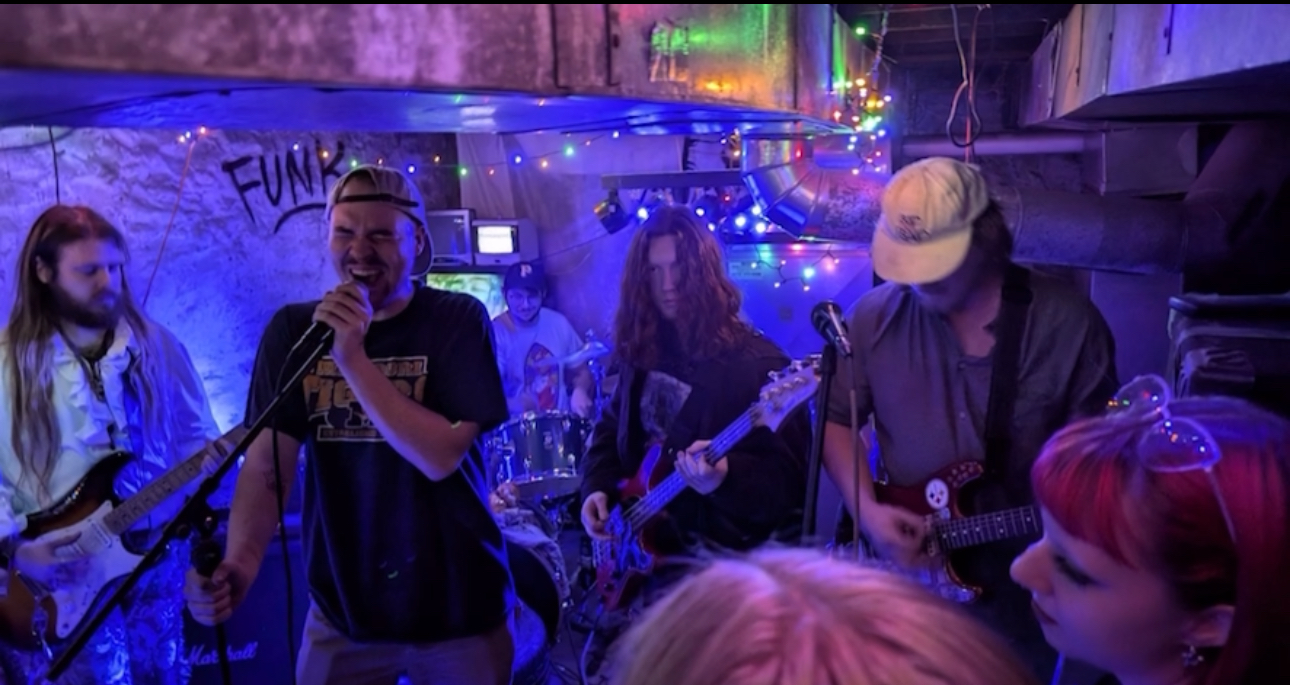
Scrum Force performing at basement show venue Kame House in Pittsburgh in 2024

Basement shows are normally held for a variety of reasons, including:

- lack of a suitable venue in the area;
- convenience and relative ease;
- host can give much back to their local scene and community;
- shows hold important symbolic value to the DIY ethic and punk/hardcore culture;
- shows completely avoid any sort of corporate sponsorship; it is therefore considered the antithesis of selling out, and keeping the scene small and independent;
- lastly, basements are more suitable for smaller bands, with an audience of fewer than 50 people.

Some bands have written songs about this, such as Deerhunter's "Basement Scene" and "Theme Song for a New Brunswick Basement Show" by Lifetime. Basement shows also build on the notion of music being more than just performance, but about the building and strengthening of community. By opening one's home to these performances where people come together to share their artwork/music, they open up a community-based cultural exchange.

== See also ==
- Punk rock
- Garage rock
- House concert
