= 1520 Sedgwick Avenue =

Building in New York City known as the birthplace of Hip Hop

Coordinates: 40°50′50″N 73°55′28″W

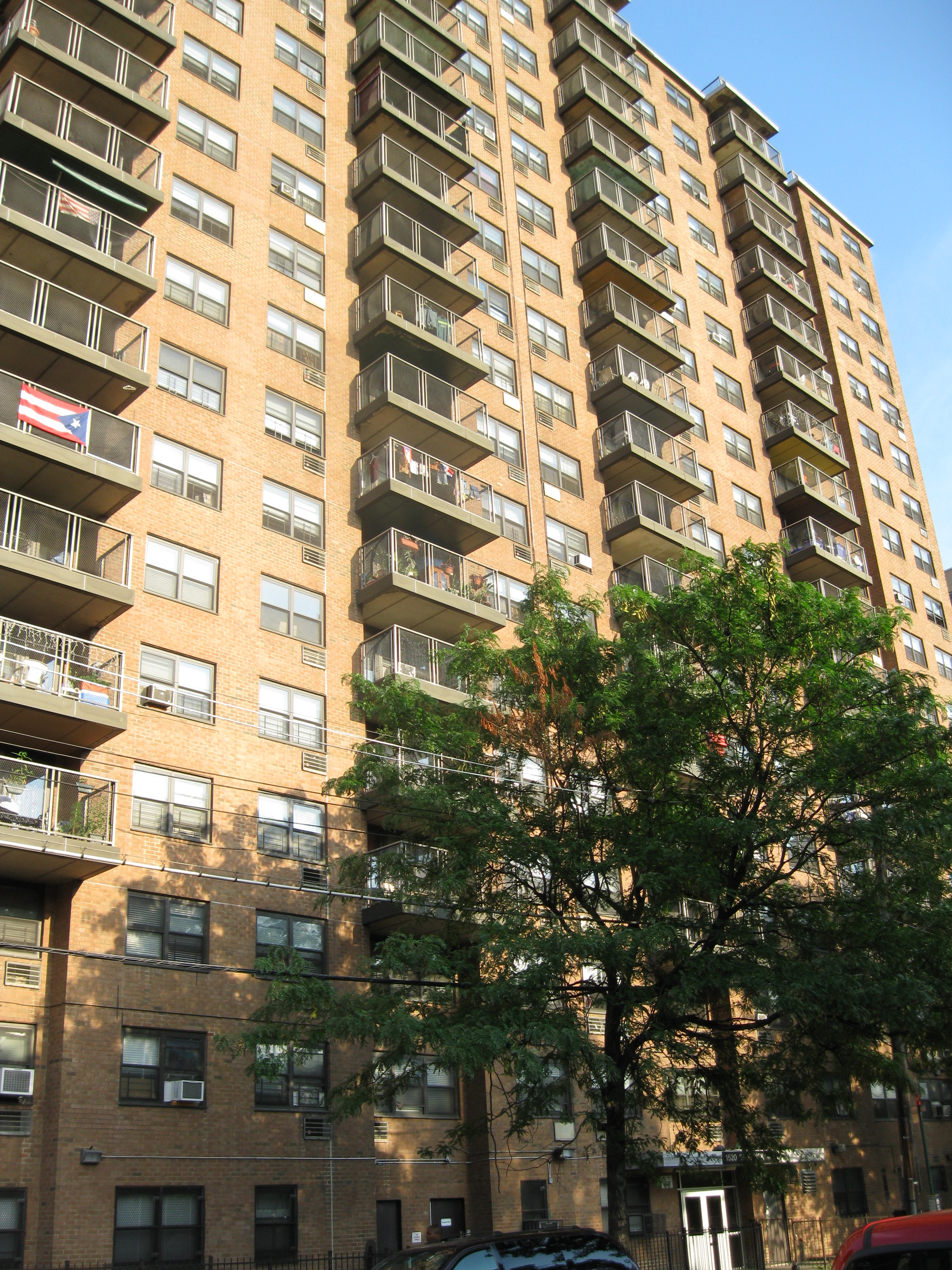
- Front of the building.
- Interactive map of the 1520 Sedgwick Avenue area

General information
- Status: Completed
- Type: Residential
- Location: The Bronx, New York City, New York, United States
- Completed: 1967

Technical details
- Floor count: 18
- Floor area: 119,919 square feet (11,140.8 m^{2})

1520 Sedgwick Avenue is a 102-unit apartment building in the Morris Heights neighborhood of the Bronx in New York City. Described in The New York Times as a long-time "haven for working class families", it has been historically accepted as the birthplace of hip hop.

The first mortgages for units at 1520 Sedgwick were made in 1967. Following a long period of neglect and shady dealings in the 1990s and 2000s, observers described the building as a symbol of the city's affordable housing crisis.

== History ==
The creation of the Cross Bronx Expressway uprooted thousands in the Bronx during the early 1970s, displacing communities, and fostering white flight. 1520 Sedgwick Avenue, which received its first mortgage in 1967, is located on the Expressway.

=== Hip Hop birthplace ===
1520 Sedgwick Avenue has been called "the birthplace of hip hop." As hip hop grew throughout the Bronx, 1520 was a starting point where Clive Campbell, later known as DJ Kool Herc, presided over parties in the community room at a pivotal point in the genre's history.

DJ Kool Herc is credited with helping to start hip hop and rap music at a house concert at 1520 Sedgwick Avenue on August 11, 1973. At the concert he was a DJ and MC in the recreation room of 1520 Sedgwick Avenue. Sources have noted that while 1520 Sedgwick Avenue was not the actual birthplace of hip hop – the genre developed slowly in several places in the 1970s – it was verified to be the place where one of the pivotal and formative events occurred that spurred hip hop culture forward. During a rally to save the building, DJ Kool Herc said, "1520 Sedgwick is the Bethlehem of hip-hop culture."

On August 11, 1973, Clive Campbell aka DJ Kool Herc spun the turntables at a back-to-school birthday party for his sister Cindy Campbell held in the recreation center at 1520 Sedgwick. After spending months perfecting a new technique involving "playing the frantic grooves at the beginning or in the middle of the song" with two turntables, a mixer, and two copies of the same record, Campbell unveiled the technique at his sister's party. After renting the recreation room for 25 dollars, Cindy charged 25 cents for females and 50 cents for males to attend. "I wrote out the invites on index cards, so all Herc had to do was show up. With the party set from 9 p.m. to 4 a.m., our mom served snacks and dad picked up the sodas and beer from a local beverage warehouse." With the exhibition of his new style, Campbell's friend Coke La Rock demonstrated another innovation called rapping. Attendees, or people who later falsely claimed to be there, include Grandmaster Caz, leader of the Cold Crush Brothers, Grandmaster Flash, Busy Bee, Afrika Bambaataa, Sheri Sher, Mean Gene, Kool DJ Red Alert, and KRS-One.

In February 2016, a sign that reads "Hip-Hop Blvd" stands outside 1520 Sedgwick Avenue.

=== Ownership and maintenance ===
Starting in the early 2000s, building owners threatened to turn 1520 into high rent units. Senator Schumer led a rally in 2007 focused on maintaining the affordable costs of the housing in order to maintain its working-class roots. The New York State Office of Parks, Recreation and Historic Preservation recognized the building as the "birthplace of hip hop" on July 5, 2007.

Starting in 2007 the building's owners sought to repeal the status afforded to the building by the Mitchell-Lama Housing Program, which allowed it to maintain rent control for low-income and working class residents. Despite work by groups such as the Urban Homesteading Assistance Board and the Tenants and Neighbors Association to preserve the building's Mitchell-Lama status, the courts allowed the building's status to be repealed. In 2008 the building was sold to a real estate group that included Mark Karasick, a prominent real estate investor, which intended to turn the building into market-rate housing. However, after the United States housing bubble burst, a period of neglect and threats of forced evictions daunted residents, and despite promises to the opposite, the building fell into decline. In 2010 the city's Housing Development Corporation provided a $5.6 million loan to allow Winn Development and a new group called Workforce Housing Advisors to buy the building's mortgage from Sovereign Bank for $6.2 million. Rafael E. Cestero, the commissioner of the New York City Department of Housing Preservation and Development, said they supported the sale in order to help provide sustainable housing for working-class families.

On November 7, 2011, following a foreclosure auction with no active bidders, Workforce Housing Advisors were able to take title of 1520 Sedgwick Avenue. Several residents, who were present at the auction along with tenant advocacy group Urban Homesteading Assistance Board, wept with joy when the auctioneer announced no bids had been registered. John Crotty of Workforce Housing Advisors told the New York Times that his group intends to renovate the distressed building and work with tenants to recognize its importance. The group's investors are more interested in steady, secure returns than in making money quickly. Some money for renovations will be provided by New York City's department of Housing Preservation and Development, and the Housing Development Corporation.

== See also ==
- Roots of hip hop
