= Americana Unplugged =

Americana Unplugged was a live music series, held every first Thursday, established in 2006 by Larry Lyon featuring singer-songwriters from across America and abroad, while contributing to local charities. Artists also performed free concerts for children, the local Veteran’s Center and retirement centers. The concerts were usually held monthly at the LaVille Inn in downtown Davis, Oklahoma. Americana Unplugged also hosted two free Christmas concerts (Albert & Gage, then Big Wide Grin) in the high school auditorium funded by local businesses. Larry Lyon donated all his time and other costs associated with the series as a way of giving back to the community.

The series showcased artists who had performed at the Kennedy Center for the Performing Arts (Johnsmith, Sisters Morales, Jez Lowe, Acoustic Eidolon), or had performed on PBS’s Austin City Limits (Albert & Gage), been Grammy nominees (John Fullbright) or Country Music Award winners (Susan Gibson for "Wide Open Spaces"), winners of song writing competitions from national music festivals (Eric Hansen, The Dreamsicles, Karen Mal, Small Potatoes, Stacey Earle), or other international competitions (Jez Lowe (England), Hans Theessink (Germany)), or have had their songs recorded by artists such as John Denver & Jerry Jeff Walker (Chuck Pyle), Chet Atkins (Emily Kaitz), The Dixie Chicks (Susan Gibson), or Clint Black & Ricky Skaggs (Shake Russell). Artists included Kevin Welch, Beppe Gambetta (Italy), Sisters Morales, Stacey Earle, Ronnie Cox (of Dueling Banjos from The Deliverance), Ken Gaines, The Laws (Canada), Tom Pra Sado Rao, Kat Eggleston, Big Wide Grin, Dana Cooper, Acoustic Idolon, Michael Fracasso, Jack Saunders and many, many more.

Each concert benefitted a local charity, with each artist receiving 100% of the cover charge while local businesses and individuals either provided a service or a pledge to make a matching percentage monetary contribution to each identified cause. As of September 2009, sponsors had pledged or contributed over $20,000 for local causes, such as the spay and neuter clinic, the family shelter, the children's shelter, the HeadStart program, the volunteer firemen and police, the high school band, Key Club and Future Farmers of America, the Davis Main Street Association, the Public School Foundation, wildlife rehabilitation, the Chamber of Commerce, and the local Boy and Girl Scouts.

The concert series ended in 2010, when organizer Larry Lyon moved to New Mexico.
