= University Heights, Bronx =

Neighborhood in New York City

University Heights
- Neighborhood of the Bronx
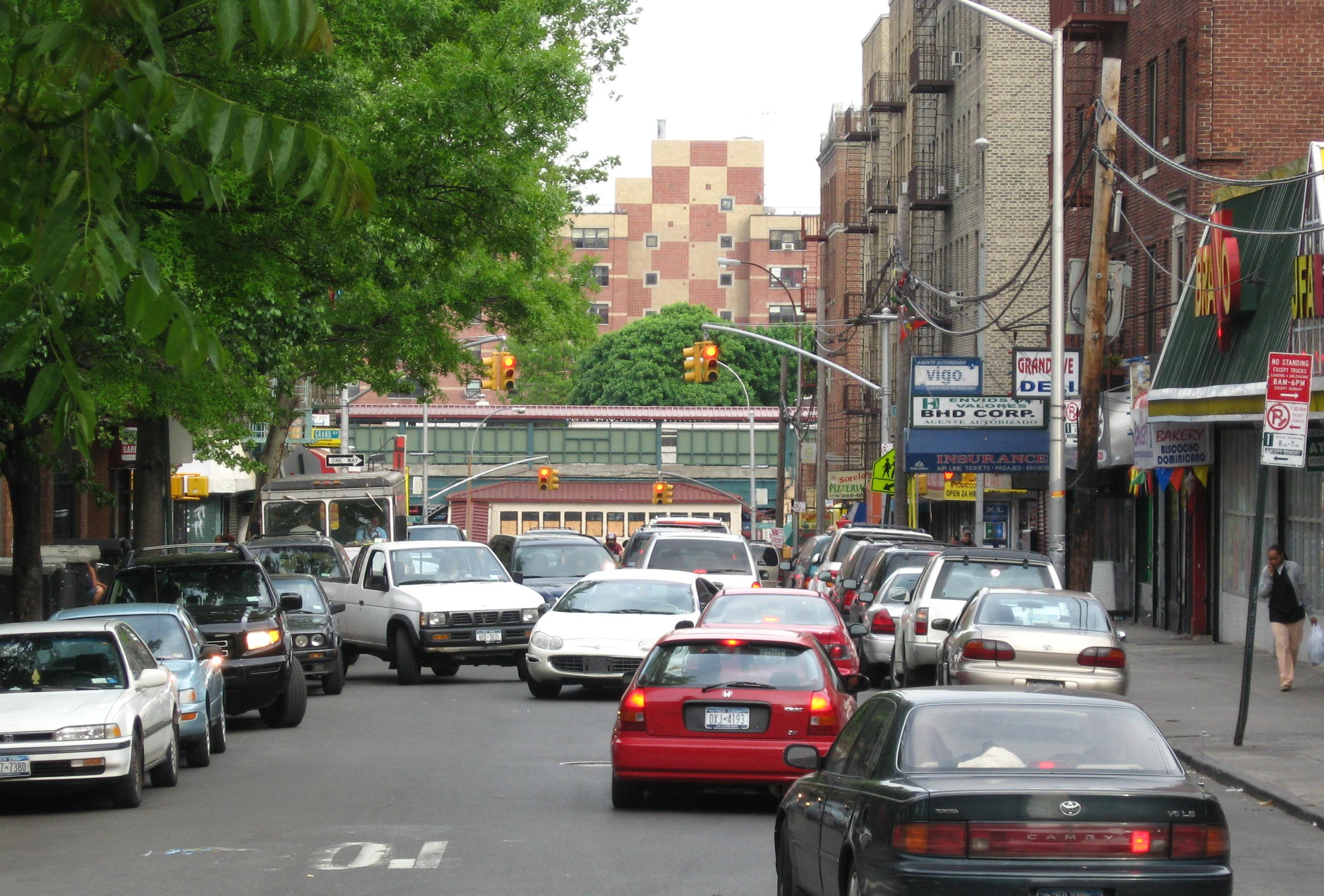
- Looking east on 183rd Street from Croton Aqueduct
- Location in New York City
- Coordinates: 40.86°N 73.909°W
- Country: United States
- State: New York
- City: New York City
- Borough: The Bronx
- Community District: Bronx 5 and Bronx 7

Area
  - Total: 0.397 sq mi (1.03 km^{2})

Population (2011)
  - Total: 25,702
  - Density: 64,700/sq mi (25,000/km^{2})

Economics
  - Median income: $29,651
- ZIP Codes: 10453, 10468
- Area code: 718, 347, 929, and 917
- Website: www.universityheights.nyc

University Heights is a neighborhood of the West Bronx in New York City. Its boundaries, starting from the north and moving clockwise, are: West Fordham Road to the north, Jerome Avenue to the east, West Burnside Avenue to the south, and the Harlem River to the west. University Avenue is the primary thoroughfare in University Heights.

The neighborhood is mostly part of Bronx Community Board 5, with a small portion in Community Board 7. Its ZIP Codes include 10453 and 10468. The nearest subway is the IRT Jerome Avenue Line (4 train), operating along Jerome Avenue. The area is patrolled by the New York City Police Department's 46th Precinct. New York City Housing Authority property in the area is patrolled by P.S.A. 7 at 737 Melrose Avenue in the Melrose section of the Bronx.

== History ==
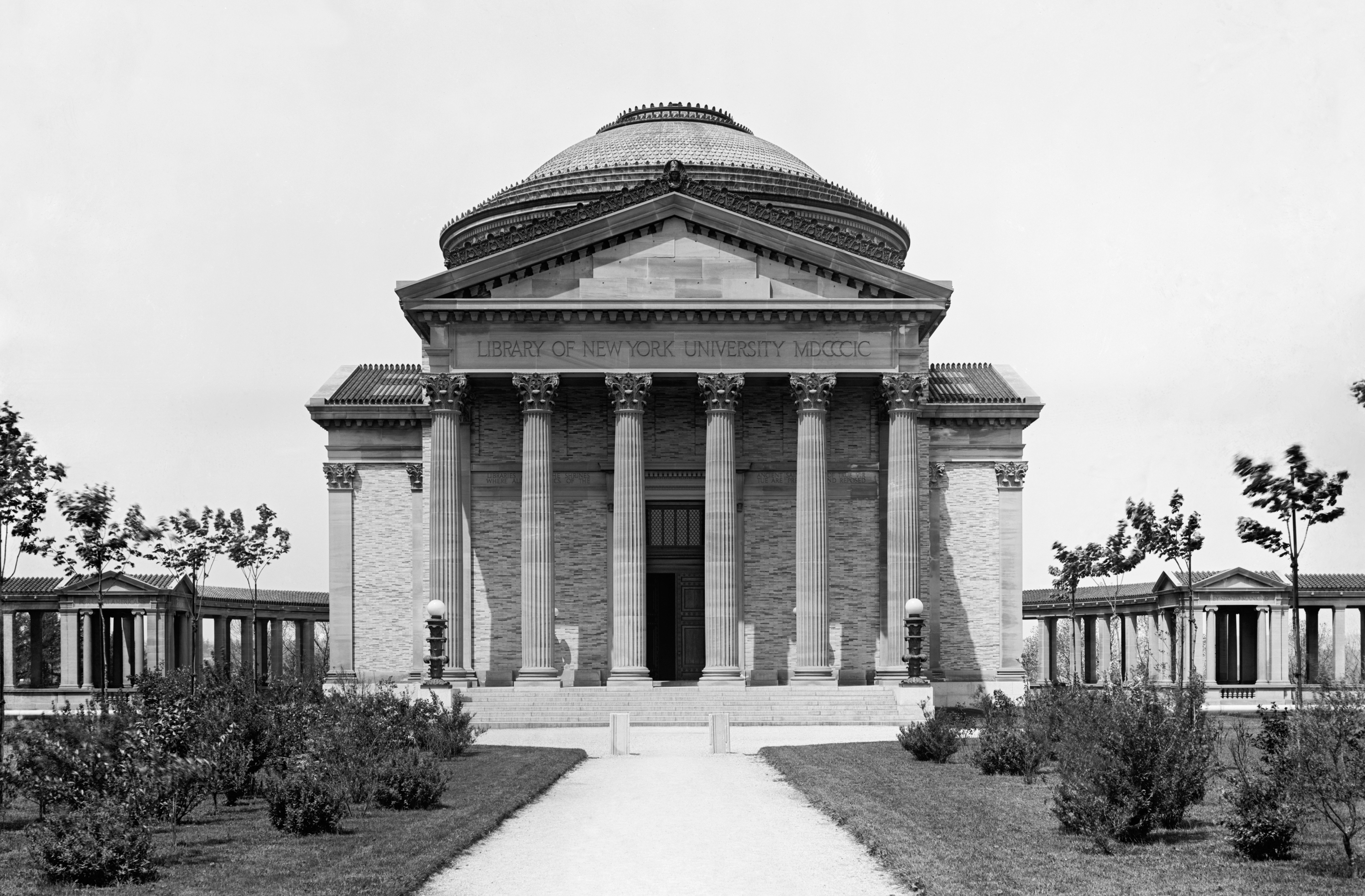
Gould Memorial Library of Bronx Community College, designed by architect Stanford White, shown in 1904 when the campus was part of New York University; the Hall of Fame for Great Americans arcade is visible on either side of the library

The neighborhood takes its name from the hill on which New York University's Bronx campus was built in 1894. The campus includes the Hall of Fame for Great Americans. Although NYU sold the campus to the City University of New York to house Bronx Community College in 1973, the neighborhood name has endured. The New York Times quoted the Encyclopedia of New York City as saying that NYU "dominated the neighborhood", since much of University Heights was filled with dormitories and other residential buildings for NYU.

With the opening of the New York City Subway's IRT Jerome Avenue Line in 1917, the neighborhood began a rapid transition from a one-time farm community that had become a place where wealthy people had their mansions and suburban villas, to an urban neighborhood built almost entirely of low-rise apartment buildings housing the prosperous middle classes.

== Demographics ==
University Heights has a population of around 25,702. There is a mix of renter-occupied as well as owner-occupied households. The demographics are 23.0% African American, 2.0% White, 3.4% Asian or Pacific Islander and 72.6% Hispanic or Latino, the majority of which are of Dominican and Puerto Rican descent.

Based on data from the 2010 United States census, the population of University Heights and Morris Heights was 54,188, a change of −147 (−0.3%) from the 54,335 counted in 2000. Covering an area of 484.32 acres (196.00 ha), the neighborhood had a population density of 111.9 inhabitants per acre (71,600/sq mi; 27,700/km^{2}). The racial makeup of the neighborhood was 1.4% (760) White, 31.8% (17,219) African American, 0.2% (106) Native American, 1.3% (688) Asian, 0% (11) Pacific Islander, 0.3% (158) from other races, and 0.8% (424) from two or more races. Hispanic or Latino of any race were 64.3% (34,822) of the population.

The entirety of Community District 5, which comprises University Heights and Fordham, had 136,151 inhabitants as of NYC Health's 2018 Community Health Profile, with an average life expectancy of 79.9 years. This is lower than the median life expectancy of 81.2 for all New York City neighborhoods. Most inhabitants are youth and middle-aged adults: 28% are between the ages of between 0–17, 29% between 25 and 44, and 23% between 45 and 64. The ratio of college-aged and elderly residents was lower, at 12% and 8% respectively.

As of 2017, the median household income in Community District 5 was $30,166. In 2018, an estimated 34% of University Heights and Fordham residents lived in poverty, compared to 25% in all of the Bronx and 20% in all of New York City. One in eight residents (13%) were unemployed, compared to 13% in the Bronx and 9% in New York City. Rent burden, or the percentage of residents who have difficulty paying their rent, is 65% in University Heights and Fordham, compared to the boroughwide and citywide rates of 58% and 51% respectively. Based on this calculation, as of 2018, University Heights and Fordham are considered low-income relative to the rest of the city and not gentrifying.

== Land use and terrain ==
University Heights consists of 5- and 6-story buildings, older multi-unit homes, newly constructed multi-unit townhouses and apartment buildings, and co-ops. The total land area is roughly one square mile. The terrain is elevated and hilly. There are many shops along Fordham Road.

=== Public housing projects ===
- There are ten NYCHA developments located in University Heights.
1. Harrison Avenue Rehab (Group A); a 5-story building.
2. Harrison Avenue Rehab (Group B); four buildings, 5 and 6 stories tall.
3. Macombs Road; two buildings, 5 and 6 stories tall.
4. Morris Heights Rehab; three buildings, 5 and 6 stories tall.
5. Sedgwick Houses; seven buildings, 14 and 15 stories tall.
6. University Avenue Rehab; four 6-story buildings.
7. West Tremont Avenue-Sedgwick Avenue Area; a 12-story building.
8. West Tremont Rehab (Group 1); two buildings, 5 and 6 stories tall.
9. West Tremont Rehab (Group 2); two 6-story buildings.
10. West Tremont Rehab (Group 3); a 5-story building.

== Police and crime ==
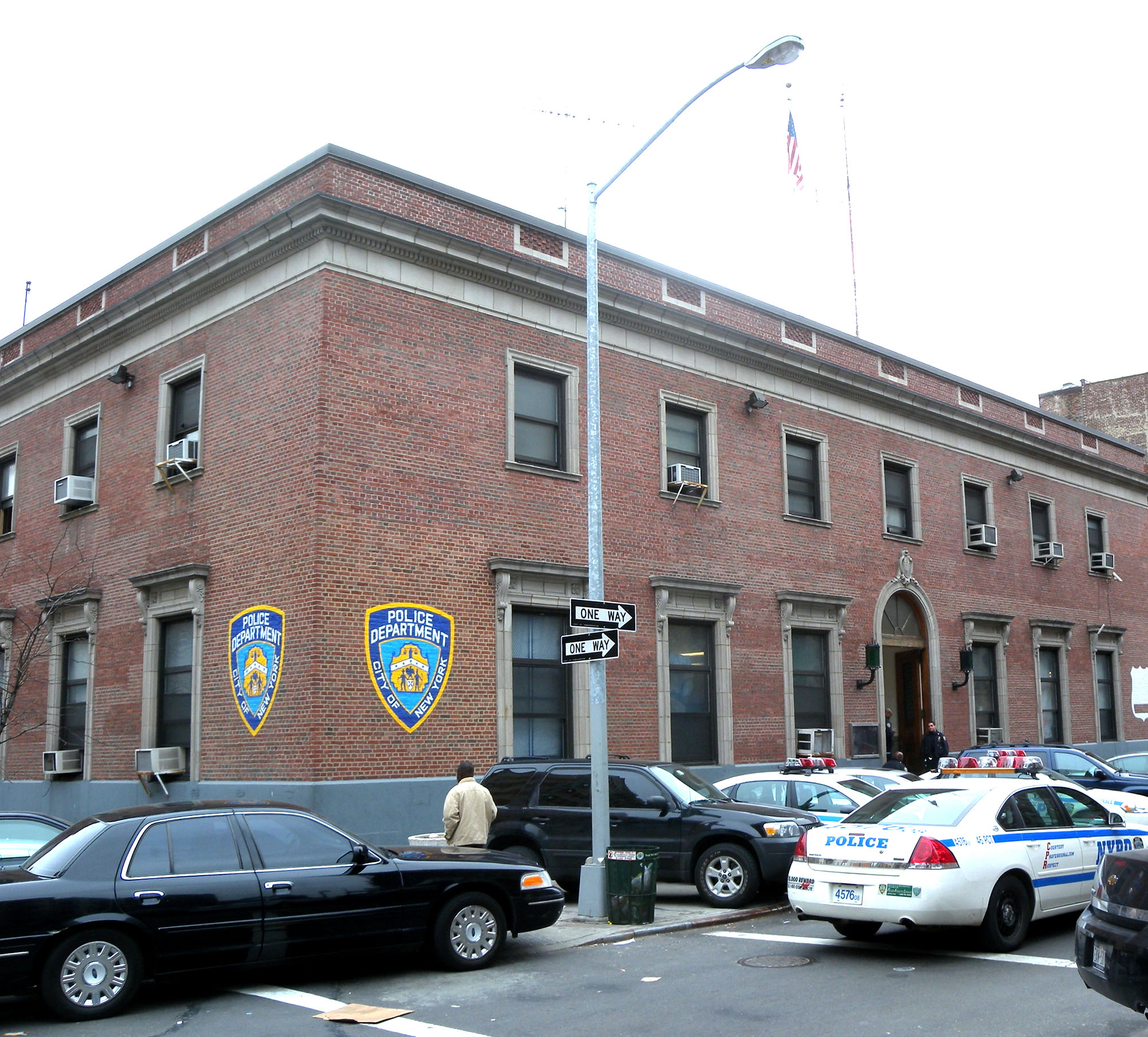
46th Precinct

University Heights and Fordham are patrolled by the 46th Precinct of the NYPD, located at 2120 Ryer Avenue. The 46th Precinct ranked 27th safest out of 69 patrol areas for per-capita crime in 2010. As of 2018, with a non-fatal assault rate of 126 per 100,000 people, University Heights and Fordham's rate of violent crimes per capita is greater than that of the city as a whole. The incarceration rate of 1,033 per 100,000 people is higher than that of the city as a whole.

The 46th Precinct has a lower crime rate than in the 1990s, with crimes across all categories having decreased by 74.6% between 1990 and 2022. The precinct reported 17 murders, 34 rapes, 384 robberies, 729 felony assaults, 218 burglaries, 611 grand larcenies, and 219 grand larcenies auto in 2022.

== Fire safety ==
University Heights is located near two New York City Fire Department (FDNY) fire stations. Engine Co. 43/Ladder Co. 59 is located at 1901 Sedgwick Avenue, while Engine Co. 75/Ladder Co. 33/Battalion 19 is located at 2175 Walton Avenue.

== Health ==
As of 2018, preterm births and births to teenage mothers are more common in University Heights and Fordham than in other places citywide. In University Heights and Fordham, there were 93 preterm births per 1,000 live births (compared to 87 per 1,000 citywide), and 35.3 births to teenage mothers per 1,000 live births (compared to 19.3 per 1,000 citywide). University Heights and Fordham has a relatively average population of residents who are uninsured. In 2018, this population of uninsured residents was estimated to be 14%, higher than the citywide rate of 12%.

The concentration of fine particulate matter, the deadliest type of air pollutant, in University Heights and Fordham is 0.0083 milligrams per cubic metre (8.3×10^{−9} oz/ft^{3}), more than the city average. Sixteen percent of University Heights and Fordham residents are smokers, which is higher than the city average of 14% of residents being smokers. In University Heights and Fordham, 34% of residents are obese, 16% are diabetic, and 27% have high blood pressure—compared to the citywide averages of 24%, 11%, and 28% respectively. In addition, 24% of children are obese, compared to the citywide average of 20%.

Seventy-eight percent of residents eat some fruits and vegetables every day, which is less than the city's average of 87%. In 2018, 67% of residents described their health as "good", "very good", or "excellent", lower than the city's average of 78%. For every supermarket in University Heights and Fordham, there are 20 bodegas.

The nearest hospitals are Bronx-Lebanon Hospital Center in Claremont, James J. Peters VA Medical Center in Kingsbridge Heights, and St Barnabas Hospital in Belmont.

== Post office and ZIP Codes ==
University Heights is covered by ZIP Codes 10453 south of Hall of Fame Terrace and 10468 north of Hall of Fame Terrace. The United States Postal Service operates the Morris Heights Station post office at 2024 Jerome Avenue.

== Education ==
University Heights and Fordham generally have a lower rate of college-educated residents than the rest of the city as of 2018. While 10% of residents age 25 and older have a college education or higher, 34% have less than a high school education and 46% are high school graduates or have some college education. By contrast, 26% of Bronx residents and 43% of city residents have a college education or higher. The percentage of University Heights and Fordham students excelling in math rose from 19% in 2000 to 43% in 2011, and reading achievement increased from 24% to 28% during the same time period.

University Heights and Fordham's rate of elementary school student absenteeism is more than the rest of New York City. In University Heights and Fordham, 30% of elementary school students missed twenty or more days per school year, higher than the citywide average of 20%. Additionally, 66% of high school students in University Heights and Fordham graduate on time, lower than the citywide average of 75%.

=== Schools ===
Public schools include:

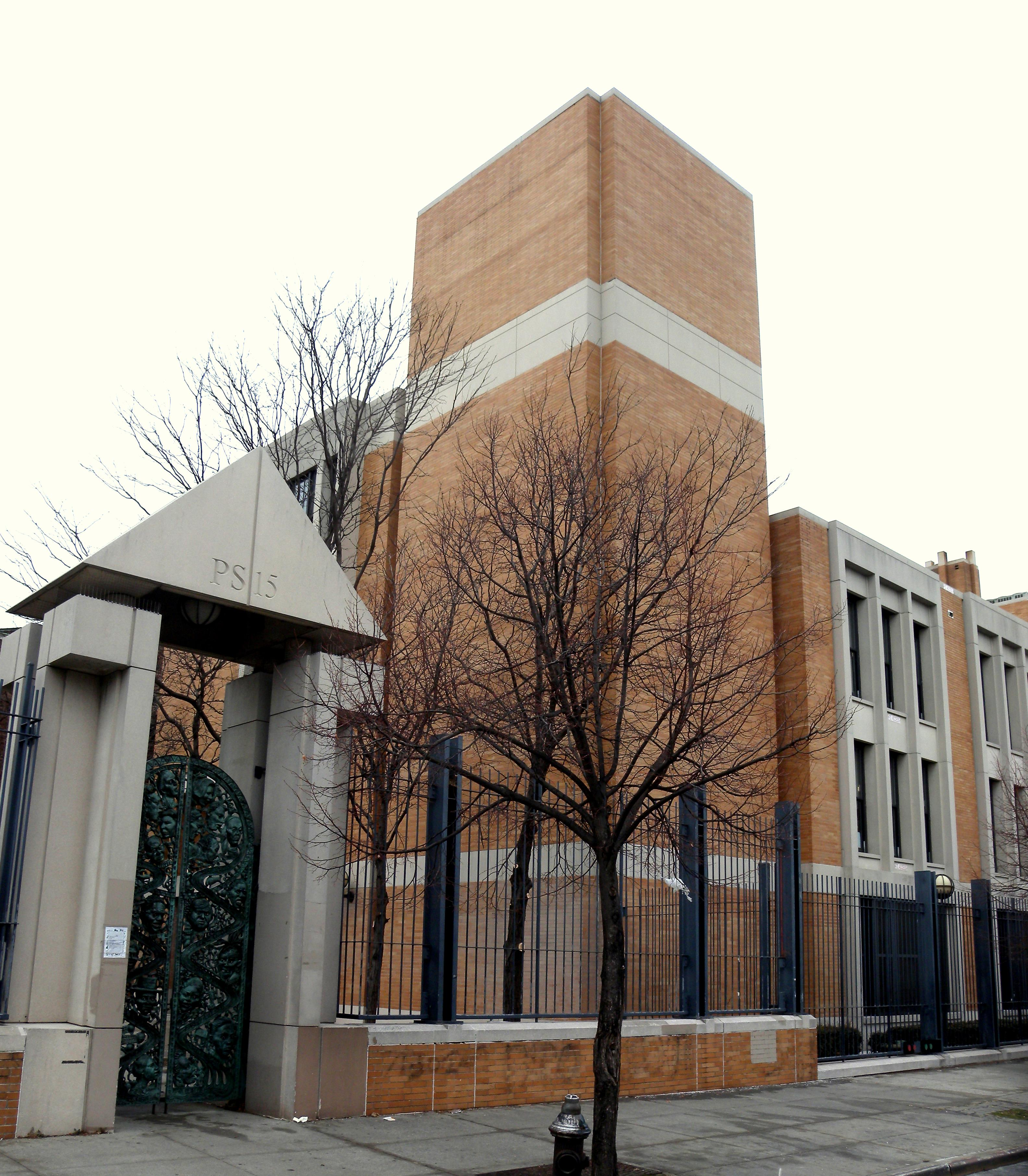
Looking northwest at PS 15

- PS/MS 15/PS 291 (Hall of Fame Terrace and Andrews Avenue North)
- PS 33: Timothy Dwight (East 184th Street and Jerome Avenue)
- MS 447: Creston Academy (East 181st Street and Creston Avenue)
- PS 91: Anthony Baez (Clinton Place and Aqueduct Avenue East)
- PS 226: Nadia J. Pagan (West Burnside Avenue and Sedgwick Avenue)
- PS/MS 279: Capt. Manuel Rivera (Walton Avenue and East 181st Street)
- PS 396 (West Burnside Avenue and Andrews Avenue South)
- MS 206: Ann Cross Mersereau (West 183rd Street and Aqueduct Avenue East)
- MS 331: The Bronx School of Science Inquiry and Investigation (West Tremont and Davidson Avenue)
- MS 390: (West Burnside Avenue and Andrews Avenue South)
- MS 399: Elizabeth Barrett Browning (East 184th Street and Morris Avenue)

In the past, the neighborhood had two parochial schools, operated by the Roman Catholic Archdiocese of New York. They have both closed, leaving no local parochial schools.

- Holy Spirit School (Dr. Martin L. King Jr. Boulevard and University Avenue), closed in 2013. Michael Powell of The New York Times wrote that the school's tuition fees were "a pittance compared with a Dalton or a Brearley."
- St. Nicholas of Tolentine Elementary School (2336 Andrews Avenue), closed in 2019

In the early- to mid-20th century, University Heights had a significant Jewish population, with a number of large synagogues. The Akiba Academy functioned from 1947 to 1970 out of the Hebrew Institute of University Heights building at 1835 University Avebue, now the Kips Bay Boys and Girls Club building. In 1968, it merged with two other Jewish day schools to form Salanter Akiba Riverdale Academy, and moved to a new Riverdale campus in 1970.

=== Libraries ===
The New York Public Library (NYPL) operates two branches near University Heights. The Francis Martin branch is located at 2150 University Avenue. Named after Bronx's first district attorney Francis W. Martin, the branch opened in 1957 and was renovated in 2008. The Jerome Park branch is located at 118 Eames Place. The branch first opened in 1957, but moved to its current one-story structure in 1969 and was renovated in 2007.

== Transportation ==
The following MTA Regional Bus Operations bus routes serve University Heights:

- Bx3: to 238th Street station (1 train) or George Washington Bridge Bus Terminal (via University Avenue)
- Bx12: to Bay Plaza Shopping Center or Inwood–207th Street station (A train) (via Fordham Road and Pelham Parkway)
- Bx32: to VA Hospital or Third Avenue–138th Street station (6 and <6> trains) (via Morris and Jerome Avenues)
- Bx40: to SUNY Maritime College or River Park Towers (via 180th Street, Tremont and Burnside Avenues)
- Bx42: to Throggs Neck or River Park Towers (via 180th Street, Tremont and Burnside Avenues)

The following New York City Subway stations serve University Heights:

- Burnside Avenue station (4 train)
- 183rd Street station (4 train)

The Metro-North Railroad's Hudson Line also serves University Heights via the University Heights station.

University Heights Bridge connects the neighborhood to Inwood, Manhattan over the Harlem River to the west.

== Notable residents ==
- Dolph Schayes, NBA basketball player

== See also ==
- Hall of Fame for Great Americans
- Sedgwick Avenue
- University Woods
- Norwood News
