= DJ Kool Herc =

Jamaican-American DJ (born 1955)

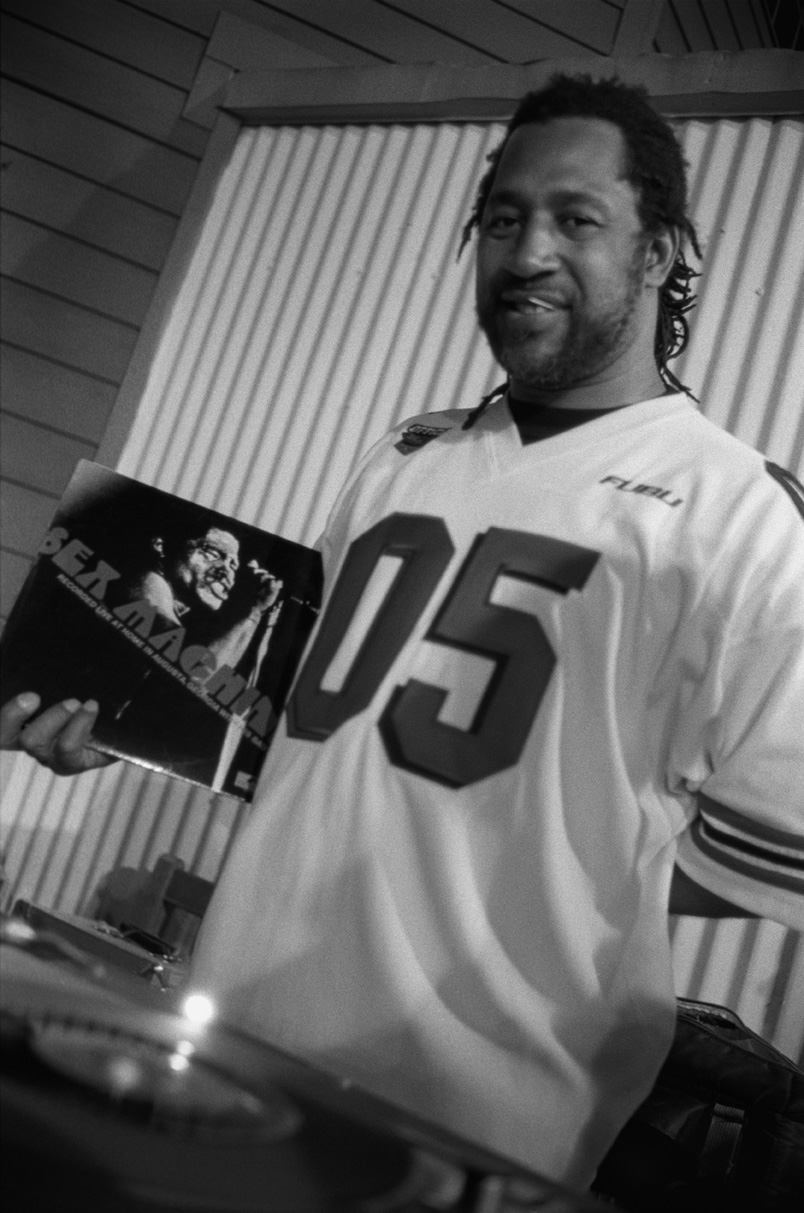
- DJ Kool Herc in 1999

Background information
- Also known as: Kool DJ Herc; Kool Herc; Father of Hip-Hop
- Born: Clive Campbell; April 16, 1955 (age 71); Kingston, Jamaica
- Origin: The Bronx, New York City, US
- Genre: Hip hop
- Occupation: DJ
- Years active: 1973–present
- Website: djkoolherc.com

Clive Campbell (born April 16, 1955), known professionally as DJ Kool Herc, is a Jamaican-American DJ. A pioneer of hip hop, he helped popularize the genre in the Bronx, New York City, in 1973. He is often referred to as the founder of hip hop. Dubbed the "Father of Hip-Hop", Campbell began playing hard funk records of the sort typified by James Brown. Campbell isolated the instrumental portion of the record which emphasized the drum beat—the "break"—and switch from one break to another. Using the same two-turntable set-up of disco DJs, he used two copies of the same record to elongate the break. This breakbeat DJing, using funky drum solos, formed the basis of hip hop. Campbell's announcements and exhortations to dancers helped lead to the syncopated, rhythmically spoken accompaniment now known as rapping.

He called the dancers "break-boys" and "break-girls", or simply b-boys and b-girls, terms that continue to be used fifty years later in the sport of breaking. Campbell's DJ style was quickly taken up by figures such as Afrika Bambaataa and Grandmaster Flash. Unlike them, he never made the move into commercially recorded hip hop in its earliest years. On November 3, 2023, Campbell was inducted into the Rock and Roll Hall of Fame in the Musical Influence Award category.

== Biography ==
=== Early life and education ===
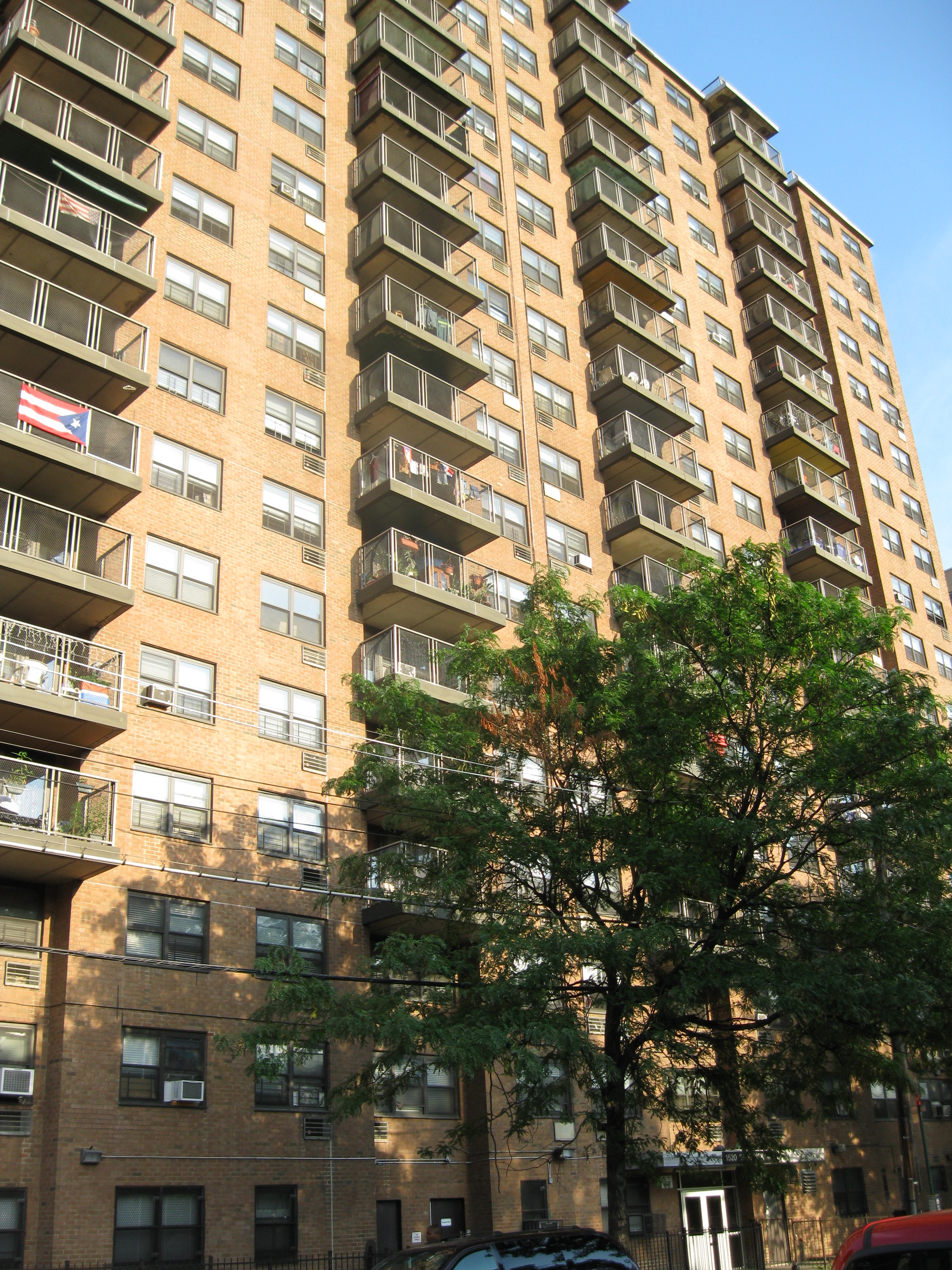
The front of 1520 Sedgwick Avenue, where Campbell lived with his family and threw his first parties

Clive Campbell was the first of six children born to Keith and Nettie Campbell in Kingston, Jamaica. While growing up, he saw and heard the sound systems of neighborhood parties called dance halls, and the accompanying speech of their DJs, known as toasting. He emigrated with his family at the age of 13 to The Bronx, New York City in November 1967.

Campbell attended the Alfred E. Smith Career and Technical Education High School in the Bronx, where his height, frame, and demeanour on the basketball court prompted the other kids to nickname him "Hercules". After being involved in a physical altercation with school bullies, the Five Percenters came to Herc's aid, befriended him and as Herc put it, helped "Americanize" him with an education in New York City street culture. He began running with a graffiti crew called the Ex-Vandals, taking the name Kool Herc. Herc recalls persuading his father to buy him a copy of "Sex Machine" by James Brown, a record that not a lot of his friends had, and which they would come to him to hear. He used the recreation room of their building, 1520 Sedgwick Avenue.

Herc's first sound system consisted of two turntables connected to two amplifiers and a Shure "Vocal Master" PA system with two speaker columns, on which he played records such as James Brown's "Give It Up or Turnit a Loose", Jimmy Castor's "It's Just Begun" and Booker T. & the M.G.'s' "Melting Pot". With Bronx clubs struggling with street gangs, uptown DJs catering to an older disco crowd with different aspirations, and commercial radio also catering to a demographic distinct from teenagers in the Bronx, Herc's parties, organized and promoted by his sister Cindy, had a ready-made audience.

=== The "break" ===
DJ Kool Herc developed the style that was used as one of the additions to the blueprints for hip hop. Herc used the record to focus on a short, heavily percussive part in it: the "break". Since this part of the record was the one the dancers liked best, Herc isolated the break and prolonged it by changing between two record players. As one record reached the end of the break, he cued a second record back to the beginning of the break, which allowed him to extend a relatively short section of music into a "five-minute loop of fury". This innovation had its roots in what Herc called "The Merry-Go-Round", a technique by which the deejay switched from break to break at the height of the party. This technique is specifically called "The Merry-Go-Round" because according to Herc, it takes one "back and forth with no slack."

Herc stated that he first introduced the Merry-Go-Round into his sets in 1973. The earliest known Merry-Go-Round involved playing James Brown's "Give It Up or Turnit a Loose" (with its refrain, "Now clap your hands! Stomp your feet!"), then switching from that record's break into the break from a second record, "Bongo Rock" by the Incredible Bongo Band. From the "Bongo Rock"'s break, Herc used a third record to switch to the break on "The Mexican" by the English rock band Babe Ruth.

Kool Herc also contributed to developing the rhyming style of hip hop by punctuating the recorded music with slang phrases, announcing: "Rock on, my mellow!" "B-boys, b-girls, are you ready? Keep on rock steady" "This is the joint! Herc beat on the point" "To the beat, y'all!" "You don't stop!" For his contributions, Time nicknamed Herc the "Founding Father of Hip Hop", called him "nascent cultural hero", and an integral part of the beginnings of hip hop.

On August 11, 1973, DJ Kool Herc was a disc jockey and emcee at a party hosted by himself and his younger sister Cindy at 1520 Sedgwick Avenue. She wanted to earn extra cash for back-to-school clothes, so she decided to throw a party where her older brother, then just 18 years old, would play music for the neighborhood in their apartment building. She promoted the event with flyers and organized the party. She also styled her brother's clothes for the party.

According to music journalist Steven Ivory, in 1973, Herc placed on the turntables two copies of Brown's 1970 Sex Machine album and ran "an extended cut 'n' mix of the percussion breakdown" from "Give It Up or Turnit a Loose", signalling the birth of hip hop.

=== B-boys and b-girls ===
The "b-boys" and "b-girls" were the dancers to Herc's breaks, who were described as "breaking". Herc has noted that "breaking" was also street slang of the time meaning "getting excited", "acting energetically", or "causing a disturbance". Herc coined the terms "b-boy", "b-girl", and "breaking" which became part of the lexicon of what would be eventually called hip hop culture. Early Kool Herc b-boy and later DJ innovator Grandmixer DXT describes the early evolution as follows:

... [E]verybody would form a circle and the B-boys would go into the center. At first the dance was simple: touch your toes, hop, kick out your leg. Then some guy went down, spun around on all fours. Everybody said wow and went home to try to come up with something better.

In the early 1980s, the media began to call this style "breakdance", which in 1991 The New York Times wrote was "an art as demanding and inventive as mainstream dance forms like ballet and jazz." Since this emerging culture was still without a name, participants often identified as "b-boys", a usage that included and went beyond the specific connection to dance, a usage that would persist in hip hop culture.

=== Move to the streets ===
With the mystique of his graffiti name, his physical stature, and the reputation of his small parties, Herc became a folk hero in the Bronx. He began to play at nearby clubs including the Hevalo (now Salvation Baptist Church), Twilight Zone, Executive Playhouse, the PAL on 183rd Street, as well as at high schools such as Dodge and Taft. Rapping duties were delegated to Coke La Rock and Theodore Puccio. Herc's collective, known as The Herculoids, was augmented by Clark Kent and dancers The Nigga Twins. Herc took his soundsystem (the herculords) —still legendary for its sheer volume—to the streets and parks of the Bronx. Nelson George recalls a schoolyard party:

The sun hadn't gone down yet, and kids were just hanging out, waiting for something to happen. Van pulls up, a bunch of guys come out with a table, crates of records. They unscrew the base of the light pole, take their equipment, attach it to that, get the electricity – Boom! We got a concert right here in the schoolyard and it's this guy Kool Herc. And he's just standing with the turntable, and the guys were studying his hands. There are people dancing, but there's as many people standing, just watching what he's doing. That was my first introduction to in-the-street, hip hop DJing.

=== Influence on artists ===
In 1975, the young Grandmaster Flash, to whom Kool Herc was, in his words, "a hero", began DJing in Herc's style. By 1976, Flash and his MCs The Furious Five played to a packed Audubon Ballroom in Manhattan. Venue owners were often nervous of unruly young crowds, however, and soon sent hip hop back to the clubs, community centres and high school gymnasiums of the Bronx.

Afrika Bambaataa first heard Kool Herc in 1973. Bambaataa, at that time a general in the notorious Black Spades gang of the Bronx, obtained his own soundsystem in 1975 and began to DJ in Herc's style, converting his followers to the non-violent Zulu Nation in the process. Kool Herc began using The Incredible Bongo Band's "Apache" as a break in 1975. It became a firm b-boy favourite—"the Bronx national anthem"—and is still in use in hip hop today. Steven Hager wrote of this period:

For over five years the Bronx had lived in constant terror of street gangs. Suddenly, in 1975, they disappeared almost as quickly as they had arrived. This happened because something better came along to replace the gangs. That something was eventually called hip-hop.

=== Later years ===
Herc in New York, 2006

Kool Herc appeared in Hollywood's motion picture take on hip hop, Beat Street (Orion, 1984), as himself. In the mid-1980s, his father died, and he became addicted to crack cocaine. "I couldn't cope, so I started medicating", he said of this period.

In 1994, Herc performed on Terminator X & the Godfathers of Threatt's album, Super Bad. In 2005, he wrote the foreword to Jeff Chang's book on hip hop, Can't Stop Won't Stop. In 2005 he appeared in the music video of "Top 5 (Dead or Alive)" by Jin from the album The Emcee's Properganda. In 2006, he became involved in getting hip hop commemorated at the Smithsonian Institution museums.

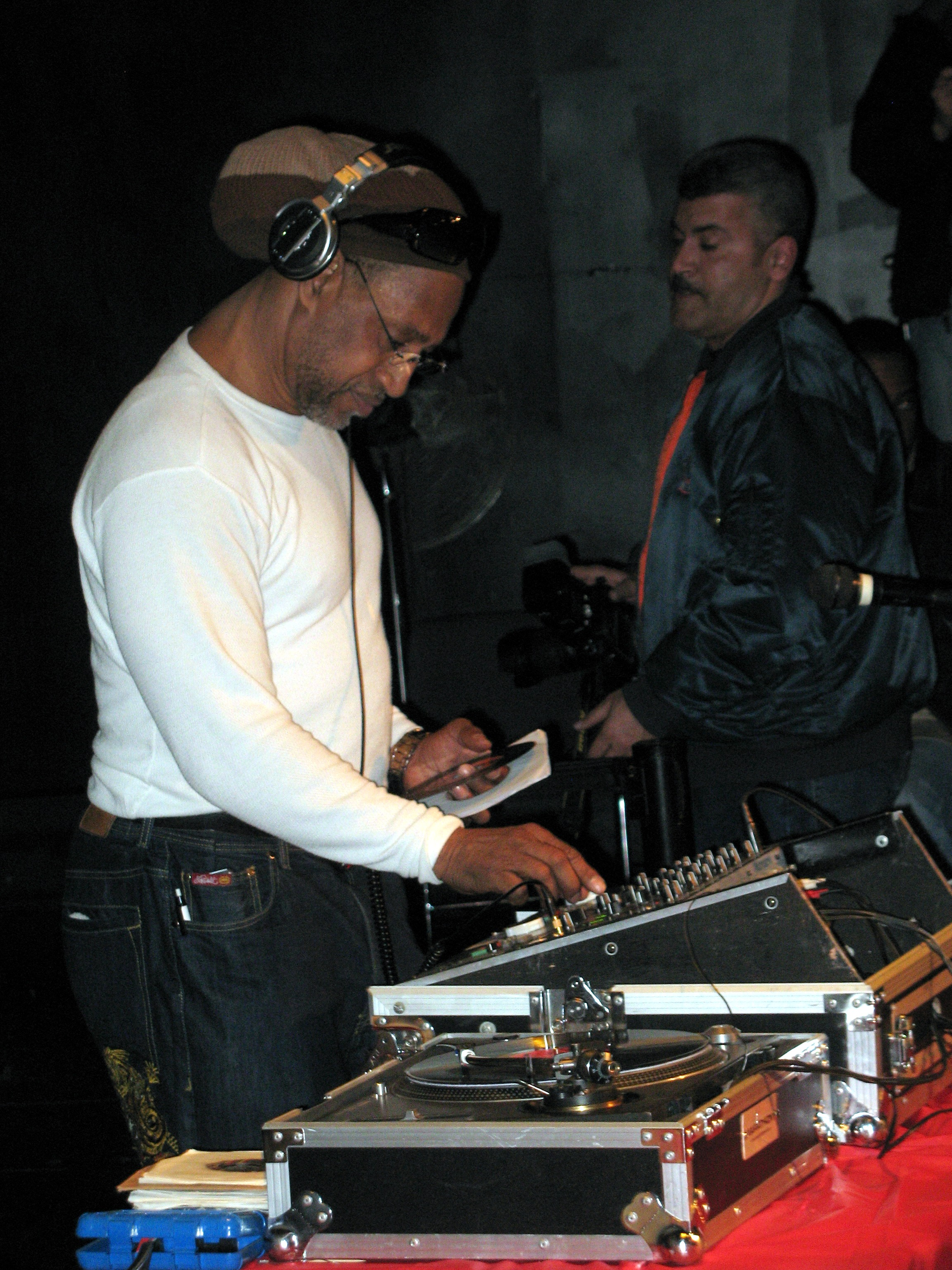
Herc spinning records in the Hunts Point section of the Bronx at a February 28, 2009 event addressing the "West Indian Roots of Hip-Hop"

Since 2007, Herc has worked on a campaign to prevent 1520 Sedgwick Avenue from being sold to developers and withdrawn from its status as a Mitchell-Lama affordable housing property. In the summer of 2007, New York state officials declared 1520 Sedgwick Avenue the "birthplace of hip-hop", and nominated it to national and state historic registers. The city's Department of Housing Preservation and Development ruled against the proposed sale in February 2008, on the grounds that "the proposed purchase price is inconsistent with the use of property as a Mitchell-Lama affordable housing development". It is the first time they have so ruled in such a case.

According to The Source, DJ Kool Herc fell gravely ill in early 2011 and was said to lack health insurance. He had surgery for kidney stones, with a stent placed to relieve the pressure. He needed follow-up surgery but St. Barnabas Hospital in the Bronx, the site that performed the previous surgery, requested that he make a deposit toward the next surgery, because he had missed several follow-up visits. (The hospital noted that it would not turn away uninsured patients in the emergency room.) DJ Kool Herc and his family set up an official website on which he described his medical issue and set a larger goal of establishing the DJ Kool Herc Fund to pioneer long-term health care solutions. In April 2013, Campbell recovered from surgery and moved into post-medical care. In May 2019, Kool Herc released his first vinyl record with Mr. Green.

== Discography ==
=== Albums ===
- DJ Kool Herc and Mr Green: Last of the Classic Beats (2019)

=== Live albums or recordings ===
- L Brothers vs The Herculoids – Bronx River Centre (1978)
- DJ Kool Herc and Whiz kid with the Herculoids: Live at T-Connection (1981)
- DJ Kool Herc: Tim Westwood show December 28, 1996

=== Guest appearances ===
- Terminator X: "Herc's Message" from Super Bad (1994)
- The Chemical Brothers: "Elektrobank" from Dig Your Own Hole (1997)
- Substantial: "Sacrifice" from Sacrifice (2008)
- DJ Sharp & DJ Icewater: "Call me Herc" from Can't Stop Won't Stop – The Next Lesson Mixtape (2005)

=== Songs ===
- DJ Kool Herc – B-Boy Boogie

== See also ==
- Disco King Mario – American rapper (1956–1994)
- DJ Hollywood – American MC and disc jockey (born 1954)
- Grandmaster Flowers – American rapper and DJ
