= Melrose, Bronx =

Neighborhood in New York City

Melrose
- Neighborhood of the Bronx
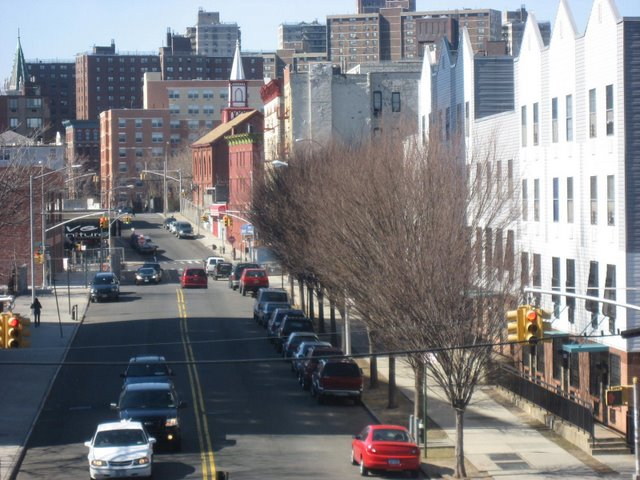
- Looking west across St Ann's Avenue and along East 156th Street
- Interactive map of Melrose
- Coordinates: 40.825°N 73.91°W
- Country: United States
- State: New York
- City: New York City
- Borough: The Bronx
- Community District: Bronx 1
- Founded: 19th century
- Named for: Melrose Abbey

Area
  - Total: 0.408 sq mi (1.06 km^{2})

Population (2011)
  - Total: 24,913
  - Density: 61,100/sq mi (23,600/km^{2})

Economics
  - Median income: $24,467
- ZIP Codes: 10451, 10455, 10456
- Area code: 718, 347, 929, and 917
- Website: www.melrose.nyc

Melrose is a residential neighborhood in the South Bronx, within the southwestern section of the New York City borough of the Bronx. It adjoins the business and onetime theater area known as The Hub. Melrose is rectangular-shaped, being bordered by Saint Anns Avenue on the east, 149th Street on the south, Park Avenue on the west, and 163rd Street to the north. Melrose Avenue and Third Avenue are the primary thoroughfares through Melrose.

The neighborhood is part of Bronx Community Board 1, and its ZIP Codes include 10451, 10455, and 10456. The area is patrolled by the New York City Police Department's 40th Precinct. New York City Housing Authority (NYCHA) property in the area is patrolled by P.S.A. 7 at 737 Melrose Avenue.

Predominantly German American in the 19th century, it was home to Haffen Brewing Company. Then the German population waned, especially post-World War II. The neighborhood until the 1960s was mostly Irish and Italian. It is now primarily Latino.

Grupo TACA operates a Bronx-area TACA Satellite at 570 Melrose Avenue.

== History ==
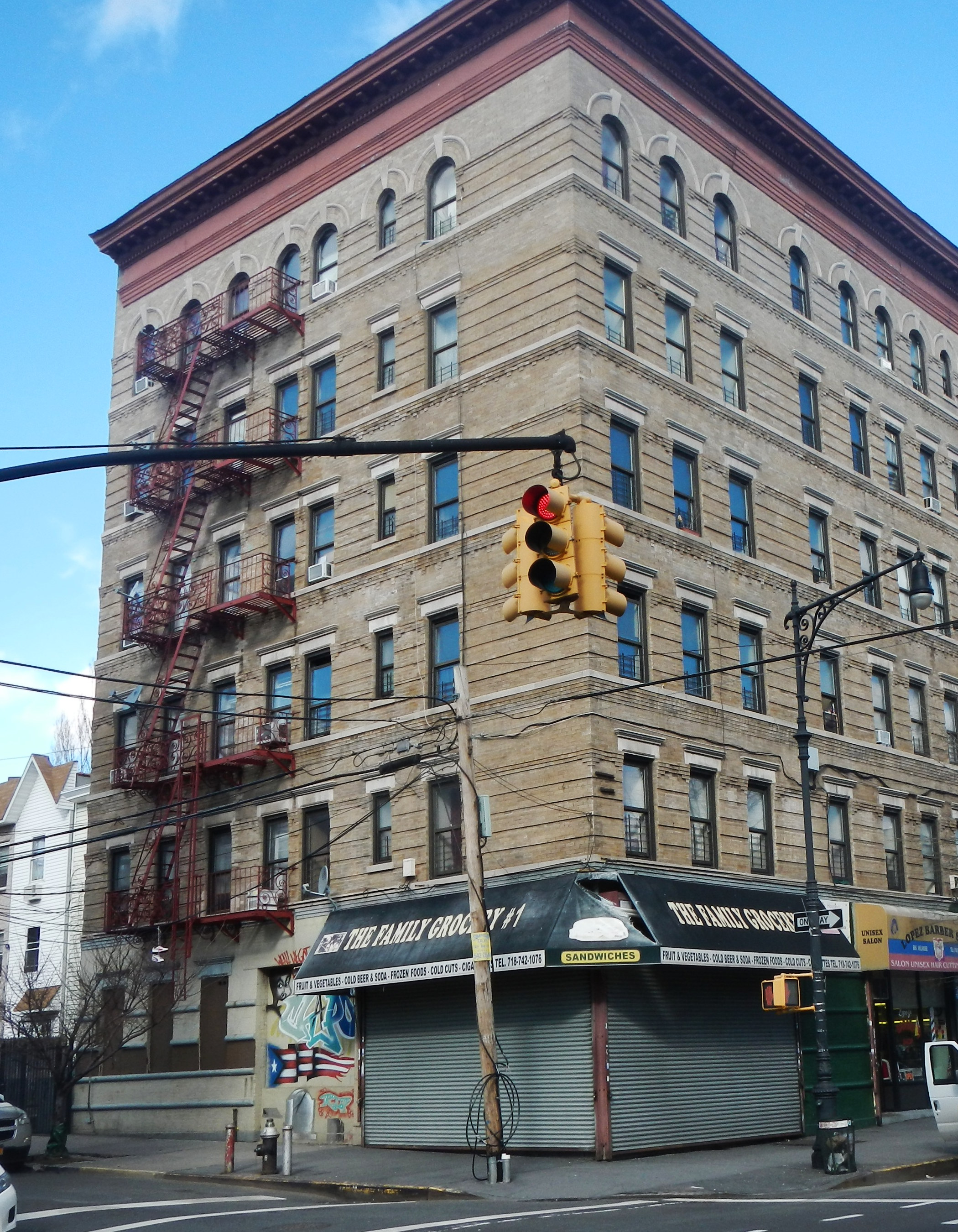
Looking northwest at apartment building on Melrose Avenue and E 154th Street

Melrose was a village in the town of Morrisania, in the county of Westchester, before being incorporated into New York City in 1874 as part of the Twenty-Third Ward. Originally a dense working-class neighborhood, the housing that was often hastily built to capitalize on the turn-of-the-20th-century immigrant escape from Manhattan soon became unsuitable to all but the poorest. A mass exodus soon took place as New York City policy–induced arson soon ravaged the neighborhood throughout the 1960s and 1970s. In 1973, the City of New York dismantled the Third Avenue El (an original draw to the neighborhood) due to low ridership. By the 1980s the neighborhood had decayed severely, and much of the original housing stock was lost. Vacant buildings and then lots became commonplace.

Since the mid-1990s, but especially in the 2000s, significant renewal has taken place. A prominent player in the revitalization efforts has been the group Nos Quedamos, which in English means "we stay". Many abandoned structures have been renovated, and many lots have been constructed on. In most recent years the area has seen a significant "Green" construction boom, with Melrose leading the borough in the number of LEED-certified apartment buildings, the largest being Via Verde, winner of the 2013 Rudy Bruner Award for Urban Excellence silver medal. Melrose is also home to the Bronx campus of Boricua College. Despite lingering social problems due to a continued significant poverty presence, Melrose has come a long way from a previously "forgotten" neighborhood.

Four historic Melrose churches date to before 1900: the German Methodist Church (1878) 790 Elton Ave., The German Reformed Church (1885) (seen in the distance with white steeple picture above) 744 Elton Ave., Immaculate Conception Church (1887) 389 E. 150th St. and the German Lutheran Church (1895) 376 E. 156th St.

The Melrose neighborhood has grown since Jimmy Carter's famous visit to the Bronx in 1977 and will continue to do so as the city's last parcels are sold for development. Many parcels are still in the development phase but will skyrocket the Melrose population.

In 2012, residents expressed concern regarding the Melrose Metro-North station in the neighborhood. Residents would like to see more frequent service, but track and capacity limitations hinder the amount of service available for the stop. Other concerns regarded the lack of handicap access and the past closure of the main entrance to the stop. The main entrance was closed when the community was at the height of its turmoil, but as the community has regained its footing the desire to have the station open to the primary commercial street, East 161st Street, has grown.

== Demographics ==
Melrose is a high-density neighborhood with a population consisting primarily of Latin Americans and African Americans. Almost half of the population lives below the federal poverty line.

Based on data from the 2010 United States census, the population of Melrose, including northeastern Mott Haven, was 39,214, a change of 6,019 (15.3%) from the 33,195 counted in 2000. Covering an area of 396.81 acres (160.58 ha), the neighborhood had a population density of 98.8 inhabitants per acre (63,200/sq mi; 24,400/km^{2}).

The racial makeup of the neighborhood was 1.5% (571) White, 27.5% (10,787) African American, 0.2% (84) Native American, 0.8% (314) Asian, 0% (11) Pacific Islander, 0.2% (93) from other races, and 0.7% (260) from two or more races. Hispanic or Latino of any race were 69.1% (27,094) of the population.

The entirety of Community District 1, which comprises Melrose and Mott Haven, had 98,403 inhabitants as of NYC Health's 2018 Community Health Profile, with an average life expectancy of 77.6 years. This is lower than the median life expectancy of 81.2 for all New York City neighborhoods. Most inhabitants are youth and middle-aged adults: 28% are between the ages of between 0–17, 28% between 25 and 44, and 21% between 45 and 64. The ratio of college-aged and elderly residents was lower, at 12% and 10% respectively.

As of 2017, the median household income in Community Districts 1 and 2, including Longwood, was $20,966. In 2018, an estimated 29% of Melrose and Mott Haven residents lived in poverty, compared to 25% in all of the Bronx and 20% in all of New York City. One in eight residents (12%) were unemployed, compared to 13% in the Bronx and 9% in New York City. Rent burden, or the percentage of residents who have difficulty paying their rent, is 58% in Melrose and Mott Haven, compared to the boroughwide and citywide rates of 58% and 51% respectively. Based on this calculation, as of 2018, Melrose and Mott Haven are considered to be low-income relative to the rest of the city and is gentrifying.

== Land use and terrain ==
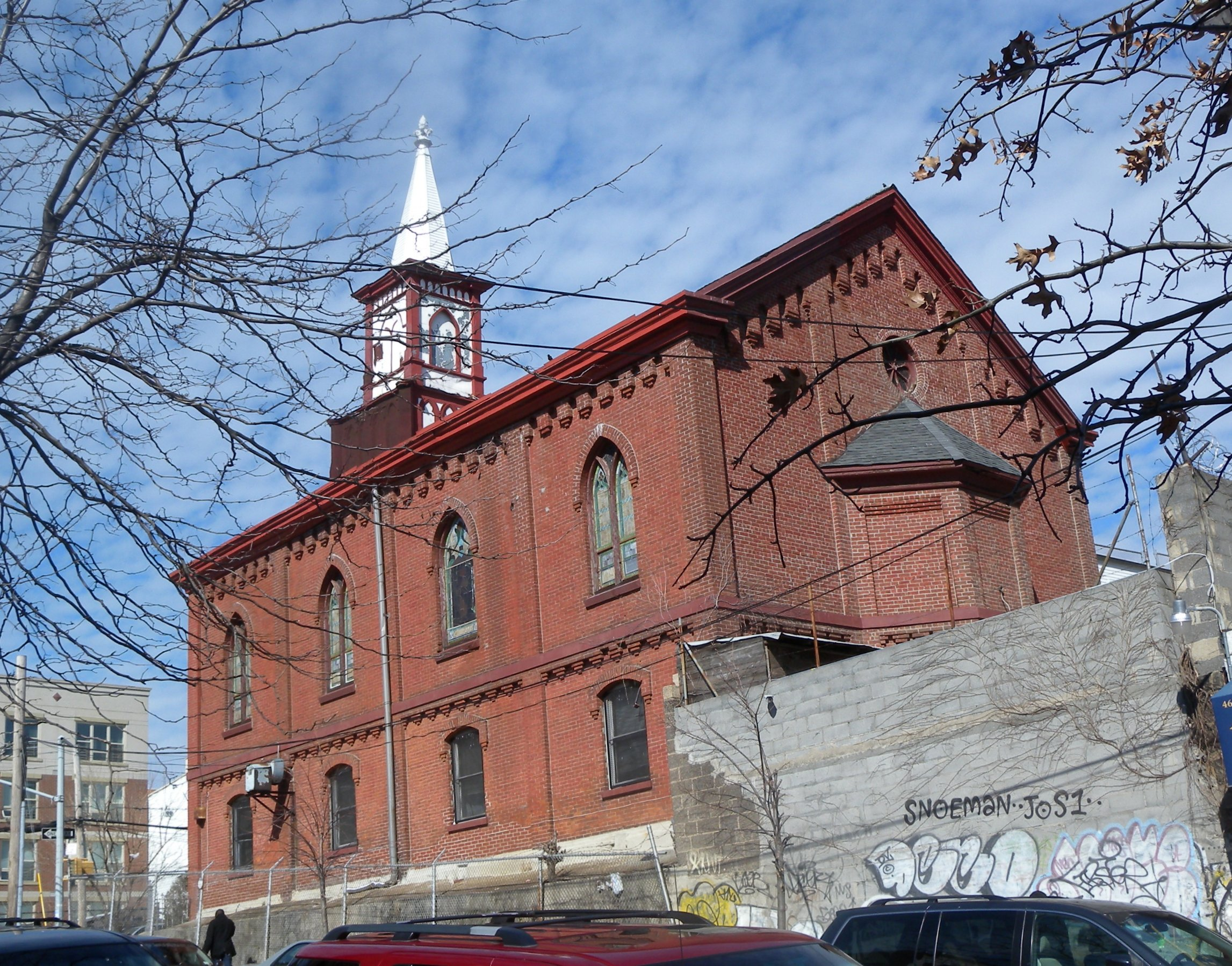
Melrose Community Reformed Church

Melrose is dominated by large residential housing complexes of various types, primarily public housing, and tenement style apartment buildings. Most of the original housing stock which consisted of older multi-unit homes and tenements were structurally damaged by arson during the citywide fiscal crisis and eventually razed by the city. In the last decade, construction of modern 2- and 3-unit row-houses and apartment buildings have increased the percentage of owners versus renters. The neighborhood contains one of the highest concentrations of NYCHA projects in the Bronx. The terrain is somewhat hilly.

=== The Third Avenue Business Improvement District ===
The Hub-Third Avenue BID is a major local retail district located where five major thoroughfares converge: East 149th Street, Westchester, Willis, Melrose and Third Avenues. The area is served by the 2 and 5 lines at East 149th Street and Third Avenue. One of The Bronx's largest shopping areas (eclipsed only by Fordham Road).

=== Low-income public housing projects ===
- There are five NYCHA developments located in Melrose.
1. East 152nd Street-Courtlandt Avenue; two buildings, 11 and 12 stories tall.
2. Jackson Houses; seven 16-story buildings.
3. Melrose Houses; eight 14-story buildings.
4. Morrisania Air Rights; three buildings, 19, 23, and 29 stories.
5. South Bronx Area (Site 402); four buildings, 3 stories tall.
- Park Avenue Green, the largest certified Passive House in North America, opened in 2019.

== Media ==
The Mott Haven Herald is a news outlet that reports in Mott Haven, Melrose, and Port Morris. It is produced by students at the City University Graduate School of Journalism and edited by Joe Hirsch.

== Police and crime ==
Melrose and Mott Haven are patrolled by the 40th Precinct of the NYPD, located at 257 Alexander Avenue. The 40th Precinct ranked 59th safest out of 69 patrol areas for per-capita crime in 2010. As of 2018, with a non-fatal assault rate of 186 per 100,000 people, Melrose and Mott Haven's rate of violent crimes per capita is greater than that of the city as a whole. The incarceration rate of 1,214 per 100,000 people is higher than that of the city as a whole.

The 40th Precinct has a lower crime rate than in the 1990s, with crimes across all categories having decreased by 60.2% between 1990 and 2022. The precinct reported 15 murders, 31 rapes, 559 robberies, 850 felony assaults, 365 burglaries, 753 grand larcenies, and 306 grand larcenies auto in 2022.

== Fire safety ==
Melrose contains two New York City Fire Department (FDNY) fire stations:

- Engine Co. 71/Ladder Co. 55/Division 6 – 720 Melrose Avenue
- Squad 41 – 330 East 150th Street

In addition, FDNY EMS Station 14 is located at Lincoln Hospital at 234 East 149th Street.

Also FDNY EMS Station 55 is located at 3134 Park Avenue.

== Health ==
As of 2018, preterm births and births to teenage mothers are more common in Melrose and Mott Haven than in other places citywide. In Melrose and Mott Haven, there were 95 preterm births per 1,000 live births (compared to 87 per 1,000 citywide), and 35.1 births to teenage mothers per 1,000 live births (compared to 19.3 per 1,000 citywide). Melrose and Mott Haven has a relatively high population of residents who are uninsured. In 2018, this population of uninsured residents was estimated to be 14%, slightly higher than the citywide rate of 12%.

The concentration of fine particulate matter, the deadliest type of air pollutant, in Melrose and Mott Haven is 0.0086 milligrams per cubic metre (8.6×10^{−9} oz/ft^{3}), more than the city average. Fifteen percent of Melrose and Mott Haven residents are smokers, which is higher than the city average of 14% of residents being smokers. In Melrose and Mott Haven, 42% of residents are obese, 20% are diabetic, and 38% have high blood pressure—compared to the citywide averages of 24%, 11%, and 28% respectively. In addition, 24% of children are obese, compared to the citywide average of 20%.

Eighty-two percent of residents eat some fruits and vegetables every day, which is less than the city's average of 87%. In 2018, 72% of residents described their health as "good", "very good", or "excellent", lower than the city's average of 78%. For every supermarket in Melrose and Mott Haven, there are 25 bodegas.

The nearest hospital is NYC Health + Hospitals/Lincoln.

== Post offices and ZIP Codes ==
Melrose is covered by multiple ZIP Codes. Most of the neighborhood is located in 10451, but the southeastern corner is part of 10455 and the northeastern corner is part of 10456. The United States Postal Service operates two post offices in Melrose: The Melcourt Station at 860 Melrose Avenue, and the Bronx Station at 558 Grand Concourse.

== Education ==
Melrose and Mott Haven generally have a lower rate of college-educated residents than the rest of the city as of 2018. While 16% of residents aged 25 and older have a college education or higher, 41% have less than a high school education and 43% are high school graduates or have some college education. By contrast, 26% of Bronx residents and 43% of city residents have a college education or higher. The percentage of Melrose and Mott Haven students excelling in math rose from 18% in 2000 to 37% in 2011, though reading achievement decreased slightly from 25% to 24% during the same time period.

Melrose and Mott Haven's rate of elementary school student absenteeism is more than the rest of New York City. In Melrose and Mott Haven, 32% of elementary school students missed twenty or more days per school year, higher than the citywide average of 20%. Additionally, 62% of high school students in Melrose and Mott Haven graduate on time, lower than the citywide average of 75%.

=== Schools ===
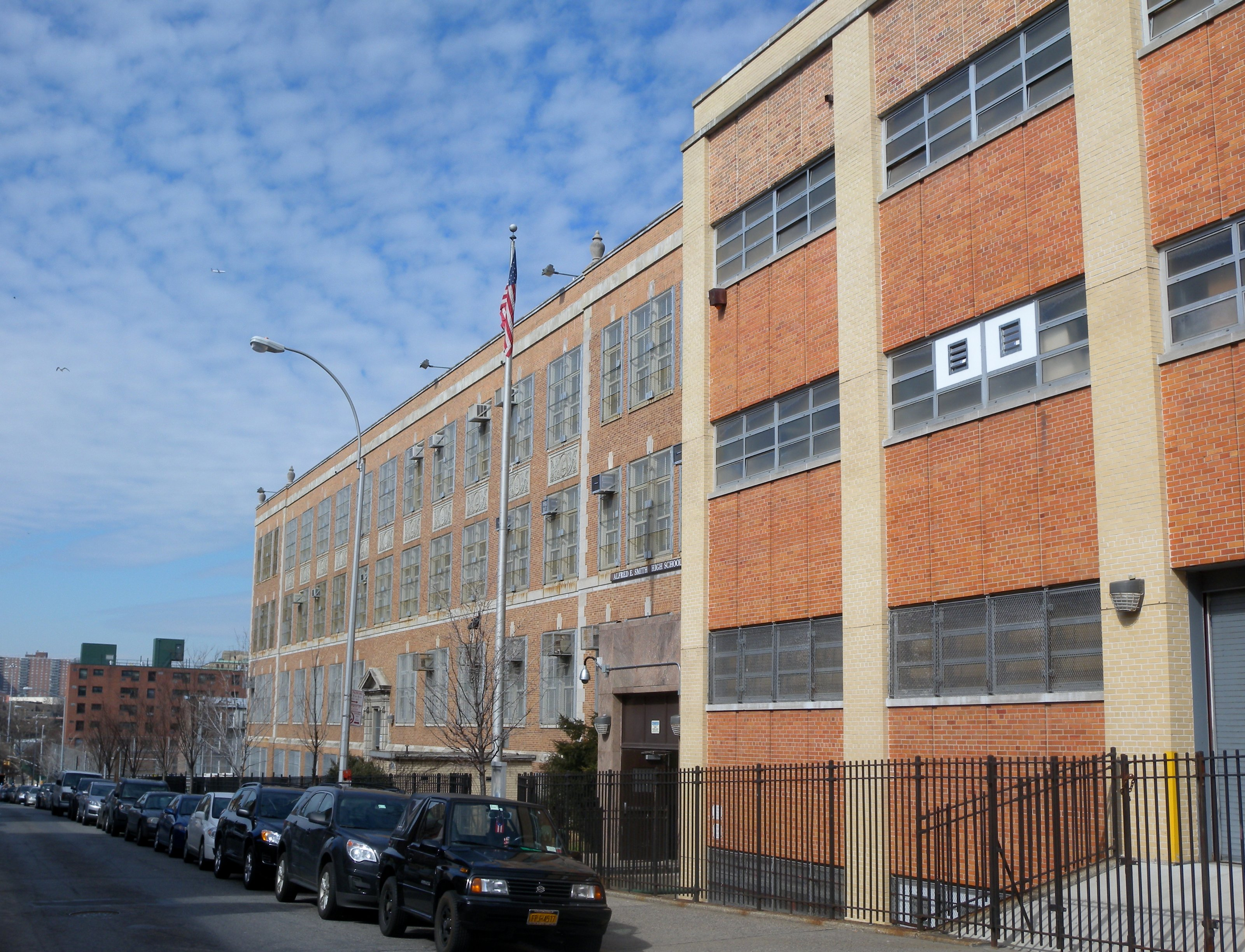
Alfred E. Smith High School on East 151st Street

Public schools:

- PS 1: Courtlandt (East 152nd St and Courtlandt Avenue)
- PS 29: Melrose (East 156th St and Courtlandt Avenue)
- Alfred E. Smith High School (East 151st St and Courtlandt Avenue)
- Bronx Haven High School (East 151st St and Courtlandt Avenue)

Private School:

- Immaculate Conception (378 E 151st St.)
- St. Peter and Paul (838 Brook Avenue)
- Boricua College (890 Washington Avenue)

=== Libraries ===
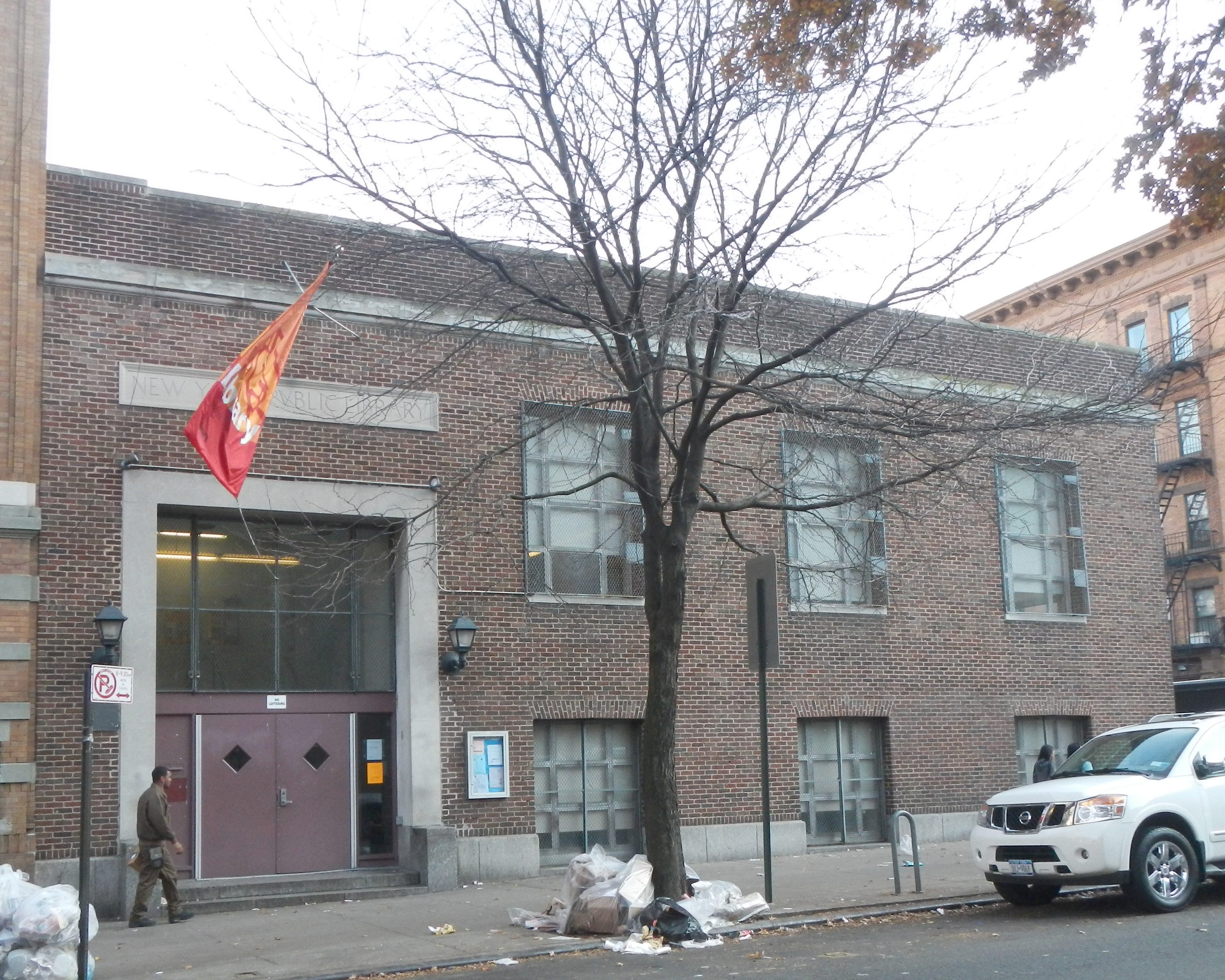
New York Public Library, Melrose branch

The New York Public Library operates the Melrose branch at 910 Morris Avenue. The branch, a two-story, 10,000-square-foot (930 m^{2}) Carnegie library, opened in 1914. It originally had four stories, but the top two floors were removed in a 1959 renovation.

== Transportation ==
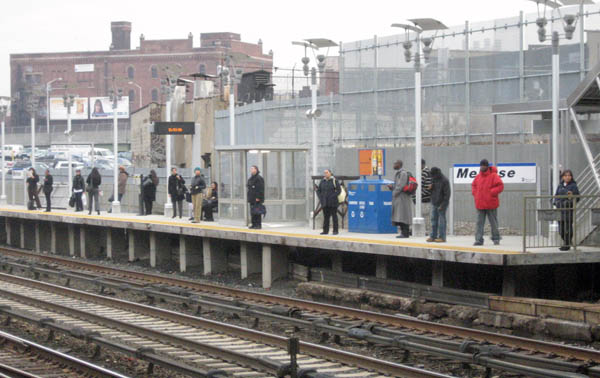
Melrose Metro-North station

The following MTA Regional Bus Operations bus routes serve Melrose:

- Bx2: to Mott Haven-136 Street or Kingsbridge Heights (via 149th Street and Grand Concourse)
- Bx4: to Third Avenue–149th Street or Westchester Square (via Westchester Avenue)
- Bx6 and Bx6 Select Bus Service: to Hunt's Point or Riverside Drive (via 161st and 163rd Streets)
- Bx15: to Fordham Plaza or The Hub (via Third Avenue)
- Bx19: to New York Botanical Garden or Riverbank State Park (via East 149th Street and Southern Boulevard)
- Bx21: to Westchester Square or Mott Haven (via Boston Road and Morris Park Avenue)
- Bx41 and Bx41 Select Bus Service: to Williamsbridge (via Webster Avenue)

The following New York City Subway stations serve Melrose:

- Third Avenue–149th Street (2 and 5 trains)
- 149th Street–Grand Concourse station (2 and 5 trains)
- 149th Street-Grand Concourse station (4 train)

Metro-North Railroad's Melrose station, a local station on 162nd Street, is served by the Harlem Line, with commuter rail service to Grand Central Terminal.

== Notable people ==
Notable current and former residents of Melrose include:

- B-Lovee (born 2000), drill rapper affiliated with the OGz group
- Willie Colon (born 1983), football player who played in the NFL for the Pittsburgh Steelers and New York Jets
- Louis F. Haffen (1854–1935), engineer and politician who was the first Bronx Borough President
- Sha EK (born 2003), drill artist affiliated with the OGz group
- Jimmie Walker (born 1947), actor who played James "J.J." Evans Jr. on the television show Good Times
