= Mott Avenue =

Mott Avenue may refer to the following stations of the New York City Subway:

- 149th Street – Grand Concourse (IRT White Plains Road Line), in the Bronx; serving the 2 and 5 trains
- Far Rockaway – Mott Avenue (IND Rockaway Line), the southern terminal of the A train in Queens
