= 231st Street station =

New York City Subway station in the Bronx

231 Street
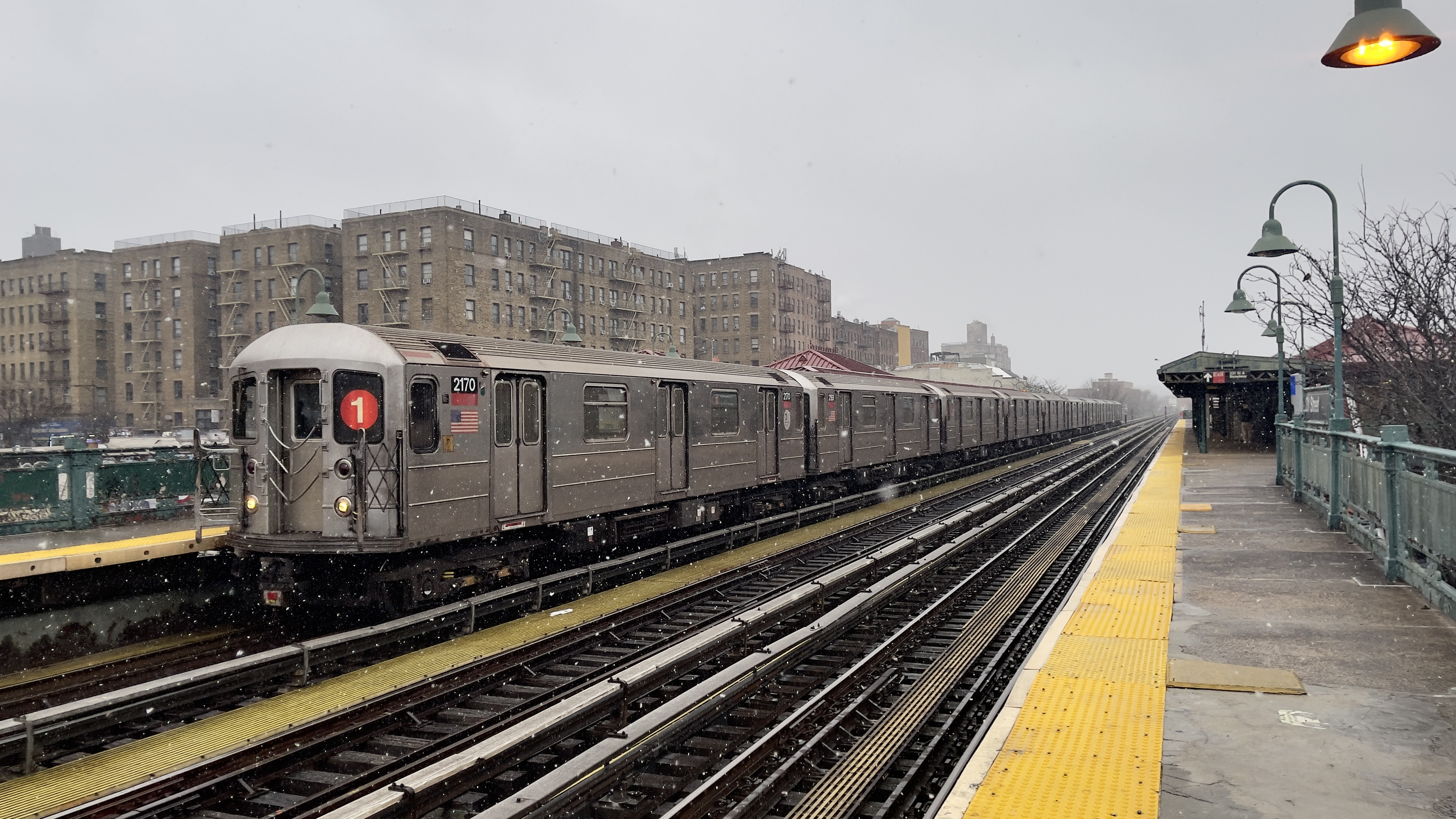
- South Ferry bound 1 train arriving

Station statistics
- Address: West 231st Street & Broadway; Bronx, New York
- Borough: The Bronx
- Locale: Kingsbridge
- Coordinates: 40.879°N 73.905°W
- Division: A (IRT)
- Line: IRT Broadway–Seventh Avenue Line
- Services: 1 (all times)
- Transit: NYCT Bus: Bx1, Bx2, Bx7, Bx9, Bx10, Bx20; MTA Bus: BxM1, BxM2, BxM18 (on 230th Street)
- Structure: Elevated
- Platforms: 2 side platforms
- Tracks: 3 (2 in regular service)

Other information
- Opened: January 27, 1907 (119 years ago)
- Accessible: Yes

Traffic
- 2025: 1,964,559 ▲9.7%
- Rank: 181 out of 423
Services
| Preceding station | New York City Subway | Following station |
|---|---|---|
| 238th Street toward Van Cortlandt Park–242nd Street | Local | Marble Hill–225th Street toward South Ferry |
Location
Location within New York City Subway
Location within New York City
Location within New York
Track layout
Street map
Station service legend
| Symbol | Description |
| Stops all times | Stops all times |

The 231st Street station is a local station on the IRT Broadway–Seventh Avenue Line of the New York City Subway. Located at the intersection of West 231st Street and Broadway in the Kingsbridge neighborhood of the Bronx, it is served by the 1 train at all times.

== History ==
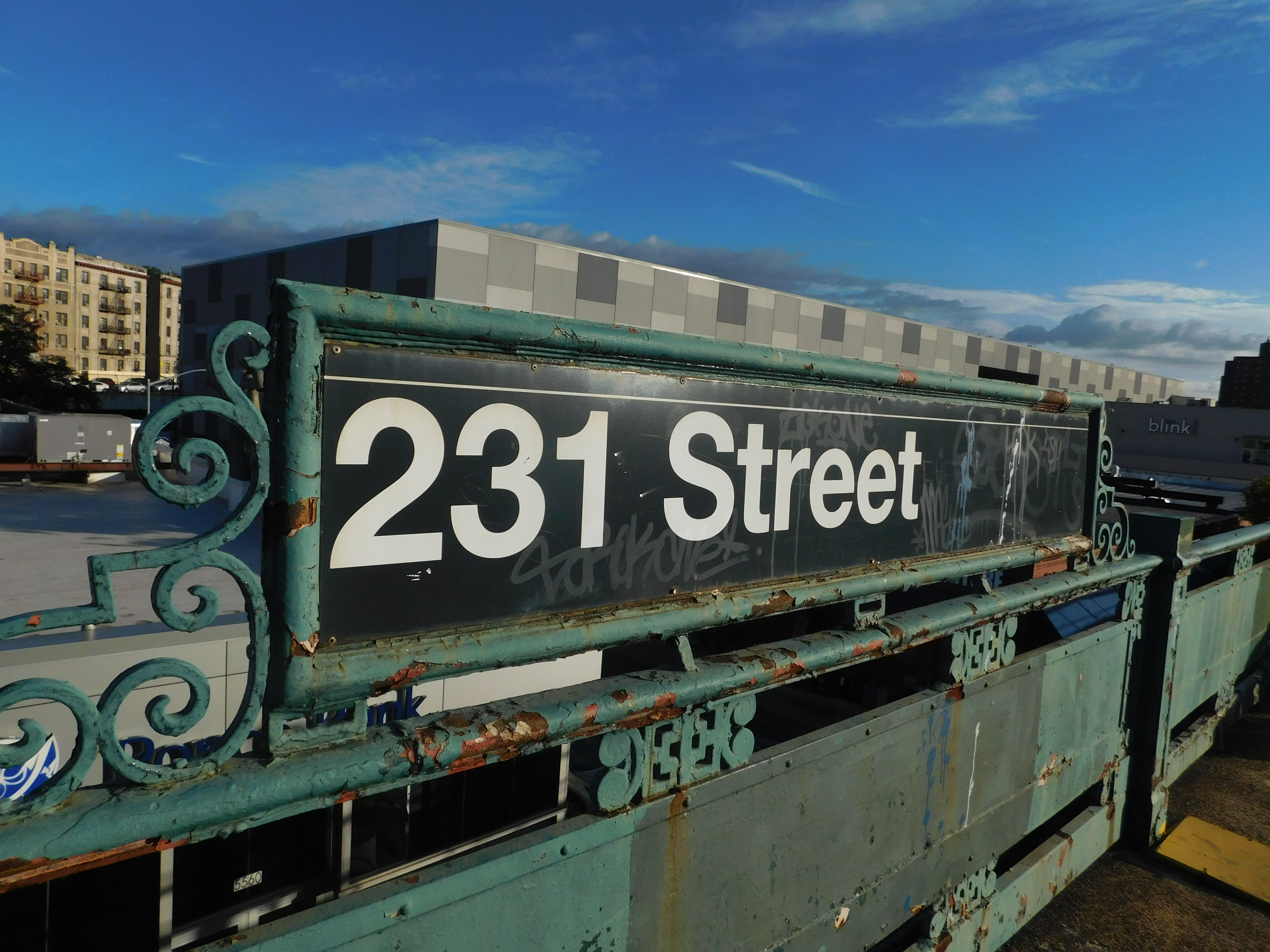
Signage at 231st Street station

This station opened on January 27, 1907, as 230th Street station. It was built near the site of the originally proposed northern terminus of the IRT Broadway–Seventh Avenue Line at Bailey Avenue and 230th Street, a block southeast of the current station. It was also located near two former Kingsbridge railroad stations owned by two separate railways inherited by the New York Central Railroad; one was along a former segment of the Spuyten Duyvil and Port Morris Railroad (now the Hudson Line), and the other was for the New York and Putnam Railroad (now abandoned).

To address overcrowding, in 1909, the New York Public Service Commission proposed lengthening the platforms at stations along the original IRT subway. As part of a modification to the IRT's construction contracts made on January 18, 1910, the company was to lengthen station platforms to accommodate ten-car express and six-car local trains. In addition to $1.5 million (equivalent to $51.8 million in 2025) spent on platform lengthening, $500,000 (equivalent to $17.3 million in 2025) was spent on building additional entrances and exits. It was anticipated that these improvements would increase capacity by 25 percent. The northbound platform at the 231st Street station was extended 50 feet (15 m) at both its north and south ends, while the southbound platform was not lengthened. Six-car local trains began operating in October 1910, and ten-car express trains began running on the West Side Line on January 24, 1911. Subsequently, the station could accommodate six-car local trains, but ten-car trains could not open some of their doors.

The city government took over the IRT's operations on June 12, 1940. Platforms at IRT Broadway–Seventh Avenue Line stations between 103rd Street and 238th Street, including those at 231st Street, were lengthened to 514 feet (157 m) between 1946 and 1948, allowing full ten-car express trains to stop at these stations. A contract for the platform extensions at 231st Street and five other stations on the line was awarded to the Rao Electrical Equipment Company and the Kaplan Electric Company in June 1946. The platform extensions at these stations were opened in stages. On July 9, 1948, the platform extensions at stations between 207th Street and 238th Street, including the 231st Street station, were opened for use at the cost of $423,000. At the same time, the IRT routes were given numbered designations with the introduction of "R-type" rolling stock, which contained rollsigns with numbered designations for each service. The route to 242nd Street became known as the 1.

In 2002, it was announced that 231st Street would be one of ten subway stations citywide, as well as one of five on the IRT Broadway–Seventh Avenue Line, to receive renovations. The station was extensively renovated in 2003–2004, which included installation of elevators for both platforms to make it fully ADA-accessible and replacing the exit-only turnstiles on the 242nd Street-bound platform with both High Entry/Exit and Exit-only turnstiles, allowing both access and exit from that side.

== Station layout ==
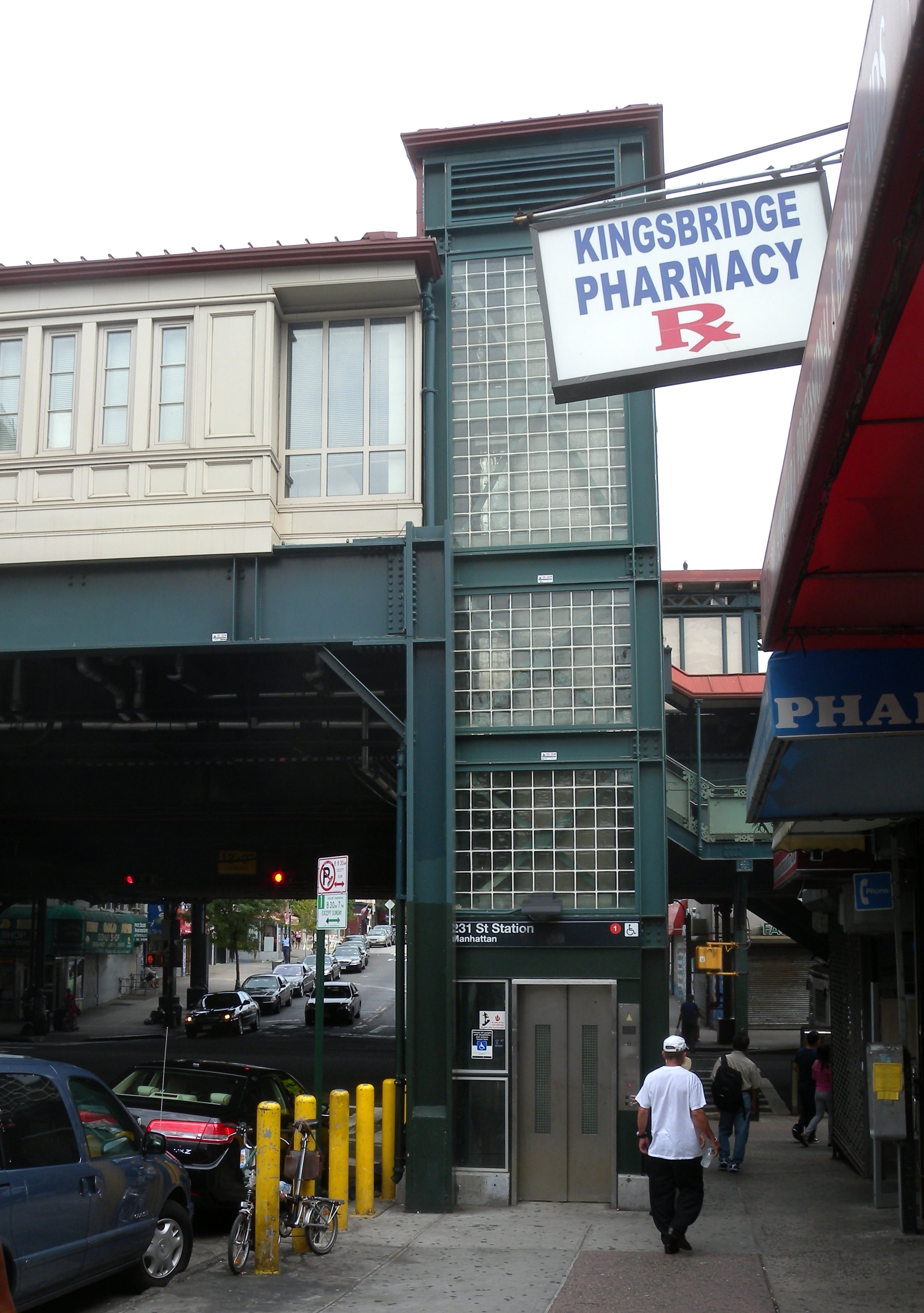
Station elevator

This elevated station has two side platforms and three tracks. The center track that bypasses this station is not used in revenue service. The station is served by the 1 at all times and is between 238th Street to the north and Marble Hill–225th Street to the south. This is the IRT Broadway–Seventh Avenue Line's southernmost station in the Bronx, as the Marble Hill–225th Street station is physically on the mainland of New York State, but legally part of Manhattan.

Both platforms have beige windscreens and red canopies with green frames and outlines in the center and green waist-high, steel fences at either ends with lampposts at regular intervals. The platforms are offset with the Manhattan-bound platform to the south of the 242nd Street-bound one. The station signs are in the standard black name plates in white lettering.

There are two sets of artwork at this station. One of them was made in 1991 and is called Elevated Nature I-IV by Wopo Holup. It consists of gray marble tiles with a green border on the platform walls of the station house. It is also located at four other stations on this line. The other artwork was made in 2007 by Felipe Galindo and is called Magic Realism in Kingsbridge. It consists of stained glass panels on the platform windscreens depicting images of the surrounding area.

Each platform has an adjacent same-level station house in the center. However, only the station house of the Manhattan-bound platform is open to the public. A set of doors from the platform leads to a small waiting area and a bank of turnstiles. On the 242nd Street-bound platform, a set of High Entry/Exit and Exit-Only turnstiles lead to a passageway around the station house separated from the platform by a metal fence.

=== Exits ===
Outside the fare control area on the Manhattan-bound platform, there is a token booth, two staircases going down to either western corner of 231st Street and Broadway, and one elevator going down to the southwest corner. Two emergency gates on the platform lead directly to each of the staircases. Outside the fare control area on the 242nd Street-bound platform, there are two staircases going down to either eastern corner of 231st Street and Broadway and one elevator going down to the southeast corner.
