= Holup =

Holup is a surname. Notable people with the surname include:

- Joe Holup (1934–1998), American basketball player
- Wopo Holup (1937–2017), American artist
