= East 149th Street (Bronx) =

Street in the Bronx, New York

Coordinates: 40.8050755°N 73.9022407°W

- Eugenio Maria de Hostos Boulevard
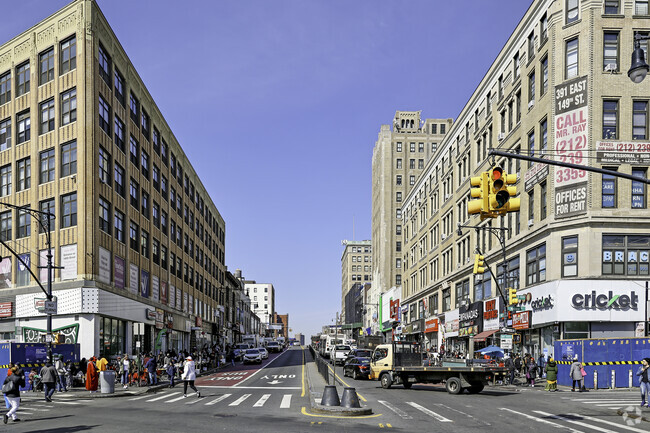
- East 149th Street at The Hub, facing west.
- Interactive map of East 149th Street
- Owner: City of New York
- Maintained by: NYCDOT
- Length: 2.0 mi (3.2 km)
- Location: Bronx, New York City
- West end: 145th Street Bridge in Mott Haven
- East end: Oak Point Avenue in Hunts Point

East 149th Street, co-named Eugenio Maria de Hostos Boulevard, is a major east-west thoroughfare in the South Bronx section of New York City, running from the Harlem River in the west to the East River in the east. It serves as the border for the neighborhoods of Mott Haven, Concourse Village, Melrose, Port Morris, and Hunts Point. East 149th Street has played a significant role in the development of the Bronx, serving as a key commercial, transportation, and cultural corridor for over a century.

In the mid-to-late 1800s, as the Bronx transitioned from rural farmland to an urbanized borough, East 149th Street emerged as an important roadway connecting the waterfront industries along the Harlem River to the growing residential and commercial districts further east. The construction of the 145th Street Bridge in 1905 provided a direct connection between Upper Manhattan and the Bronx, reinforcing 149th Street’s role as a vital east-west route.

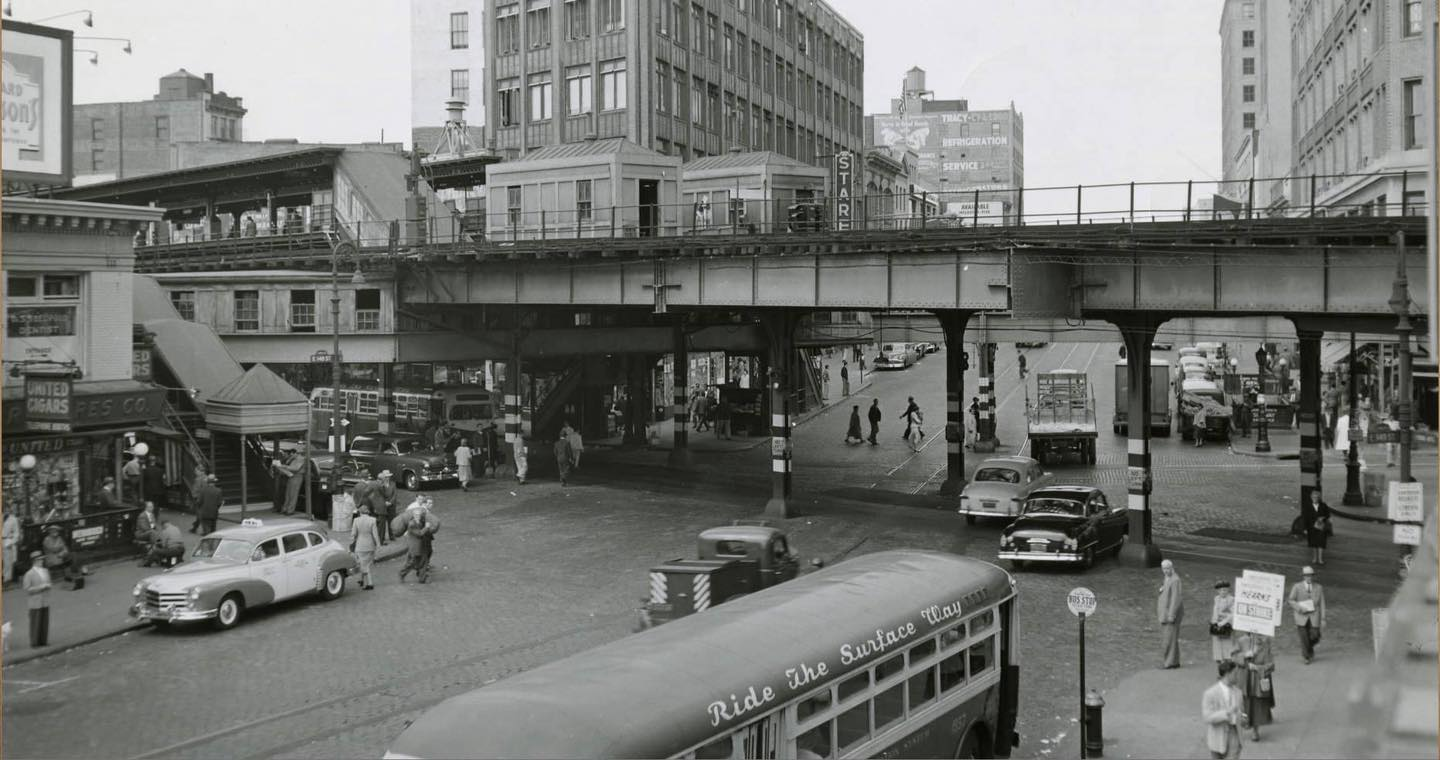
149th Street at The Hub, 1953

By the early 1900s, 149th Street became a bustling commercial strip, particularly at the intersection of Third Avenue, Melrose Avenue, and Willis Avenue, where The Hub developed as a major shopping and business district. This area became known as "The Broadway of the Bronx", attracting department stores, theaters, and restaurants. The expansion of the elevated train and trolley lines further boosted commercial activity, making 149th Street one of the busiest streets in the South Bronx.

The 1950s-1970s saw economic shifts that impacted the Bronx, including deindustrialization, suburban migration, and financial disinvestment. Many businesses along 149th Street closed, and The Hub declined in prominence. The South Bronx became synonymous with urban decay during this period, as abandoned buildings and economic hardship affected the neighborhood.

Recently, East 149th Street has experienced significant revitalization. New housing developments, community initiatives, and commercial investments have brought renewed vibrancy to the corridor. The Bronx General Post Office at 558 Grand Concourse, a landmarked Art Deco building, was repurposed into a mixed-use facility.

The East 149th Street Development transformed an underutilized industrial site into 310 units of affordable housing and recreational space, addressing the community's need for residential options. Additionally, 110 East 149th Street became the first ground-up office building constructed in the Bronx in decades, reflecting the area's growing appeal as a place to live and work.

== Transportation ==
The following bus routes serves 149th Street:

- The Bx19 is the primary route of 149th Street, serving from the 145th Street Bridge to Southern Boulevard.
- The Bx2 runs from Bergen Avenue to Grand Concourse.
- The Bx17 runs from St. Ann's Avenue to Prospect Avenue.

Several bus routes terminates at 149th Street:

- The Bx4 at The Hub - serving Westchester Avenue.
- The Bx13 at the Bronx Terminal Market - serving River Avenue.
- The Bx15 and Bx15 Limited at The Hub - serving Third Avenue.
- The Bx41 and Bx41 SBS at The Hub - serving Melrose Avenue.
- The M125 at The Hub - serving Willis Avenue

There are three subway stations that serves 149th Street:

- 149th Street–Grand Concourse (2, 4, and 5 trains).
- Third Avenue–149th Street (2 and 5 trains).
- East 149th Street (6 train) at Southern Boulevard.
