= Bx1 and Bx2 buses =

Bus routes in the Bronx, New York

bx1 bx1, bx2
- Grand Concourse
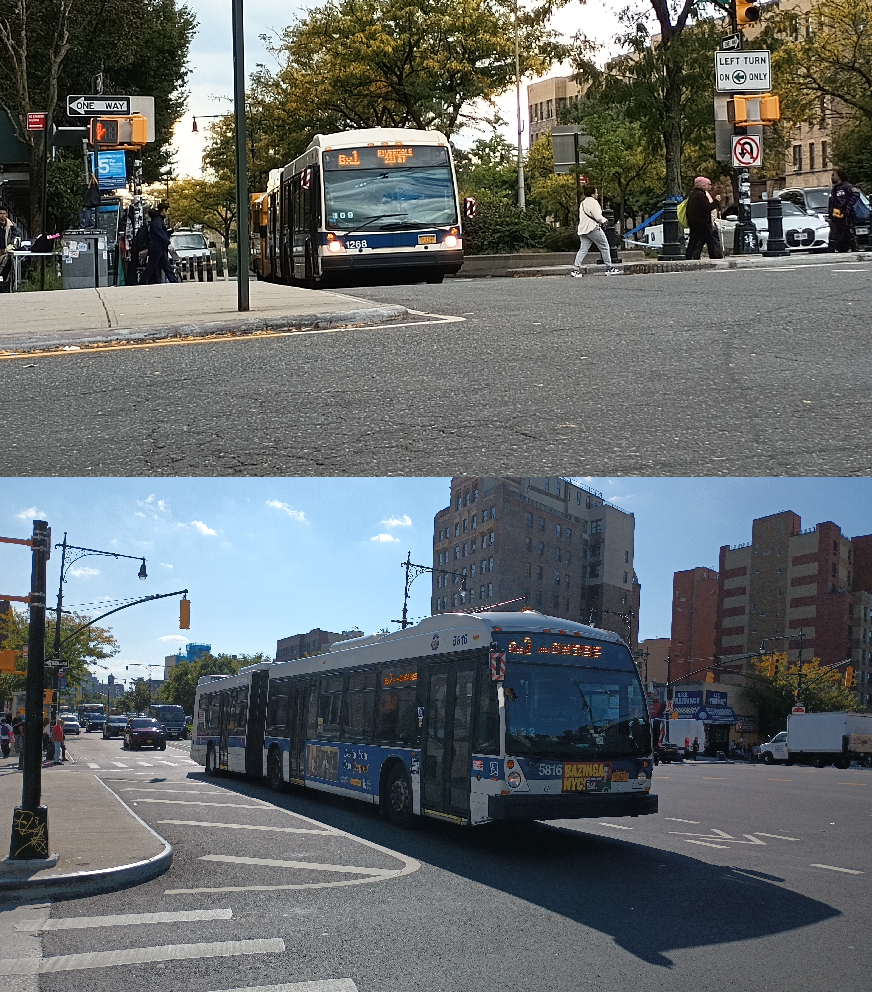
- A 2010 Nova Bus LFS Articulated (1268) on the Riverdale-bound Bx1 Limited (top) at 167th Street and a 2011 Nova Bus LFS Articulated (5816) on the Bx2 (bottom) at Burnside Avenue.

Overview
- System: MTA Regional Bus Operations
- Operator: Manhattan and Bronx Surface Transit Operating Authority
- Garage: Kingsbridge Depot
- Vehicle: Main vehicles: Nova Bus LFS articulated; New Flyer Xcelsior XD60; Supplemental service: Nova Bus LFS; Nova Bus LFS HEV; Nova Bus LFSe+
- Began service: 1921

Route
- Locale: The Bronx, New York, U.S.
- Communities served: Riverdale, Kingsbridge, Kingsbridge Heights, Bedford Park, Fordham, Tremont, Concourse, Melrose, Mott Haven
- Start: Bx1: Riverdale – 231st Street; Bx2: Kingsbridge Heights – Fort Independence Street
- Via: Grand Concourse, East 149th Street (Bx2 only)
- End: Mott Haven – 138th Street
- Length: Bx1: 7.5 miles (12.1 km); Bx2: 7 miles (11 km)

Service
- Operates: All times except late nights
- Annual patronage: 4,453,946 (2025)
- Transfers: Yes
- Timetable: Bx1/Bx2

The Bx1 and Bx2 are two bus routes that run on the Grand Concourse in the Bronx, New York City. The routes, which are operated by MaBSTOA, also follow Sedgwick Avenue and Mosholu Parkway for a short distance at their northern end. As the numbers suggest, these were the first two bus routes in the Bronx.

== Route description and service ==
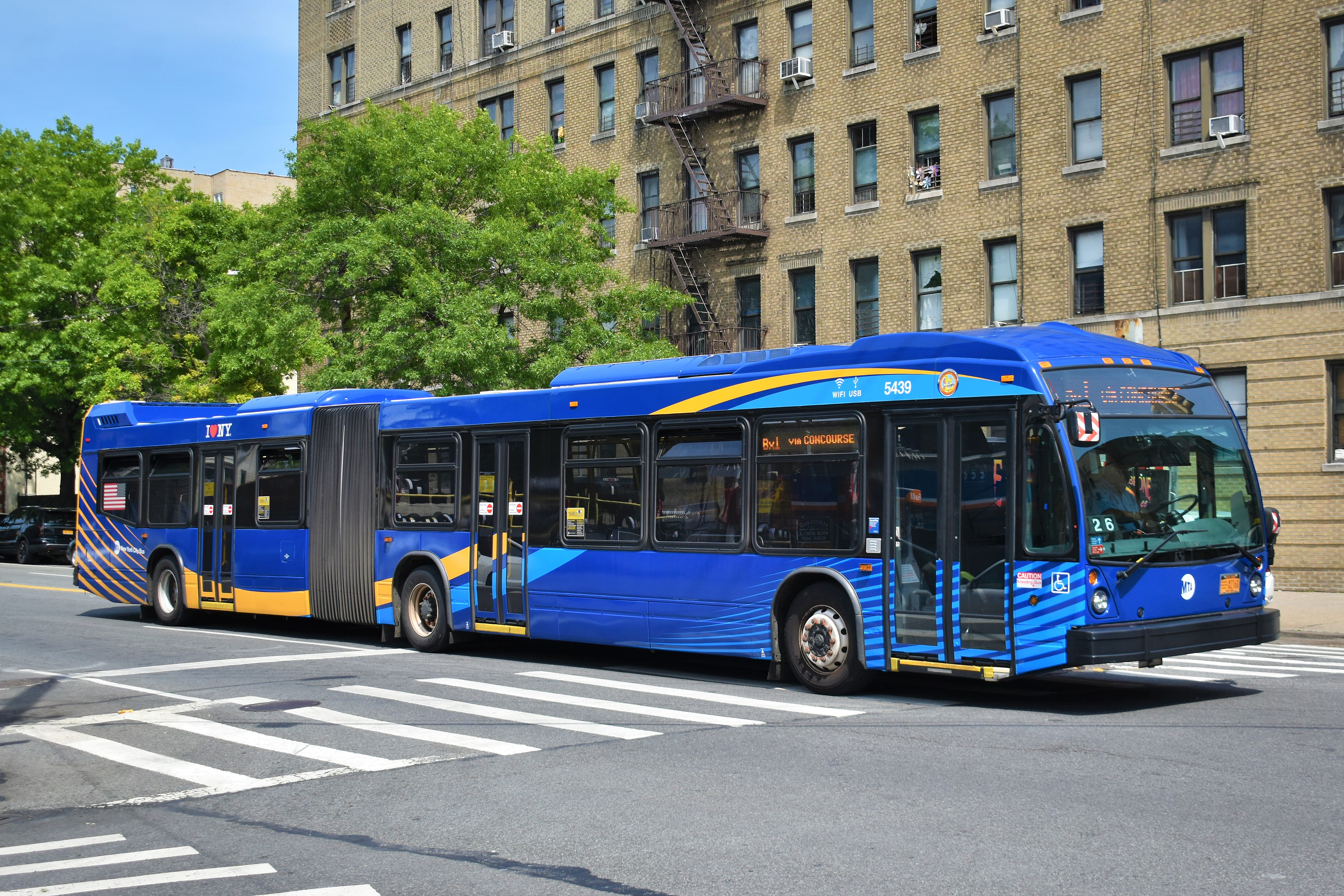
A 2016 Nova Bus LFS Articulated (5439) waiting to make a left turn in Kingsbridge on the Bx1 Limited, bound for Mott Haven.

Except at their extreme northern and southern ends, the Bx1 and Bx2 share the same alignment. The only differences are:

- In Mott Haven (southern end), the Bx2 turns east at Hostos Community College and then runs along 149th Street to serve some of the shopping district between there and Third Avenue, then turning south onto Courtlandt Avenue, which ends at Third Avenue and 146th Street, allowing the Bx2 to continue to operate down Third Avenue toward 136th Street, while the Bx1 continues down Grand Concourse.
- In Kingsbridge Heights (northern end), only the Bx1 continues down into Riverdale along 231st Street, though some early morning Bx2 cut-ins and early Sunday AM service also serves this segment.

The Bx1 and Bx2 bus routes share the majority of their alignment from the Grand Concourse and 149th Street north along the Concourse and Mosholu Parkway and west along Sedgwick Avenue to Heath Avenue on the west side of the Jerome Park Reservoir. At their ends, a divergence occurs as noted above.

Until August 2008, when permanent traffic changes were enacted in Mott Haven at 149th Street, Melrose/Willis Avenues, and Third Avenue, the Bx2 turned east off of the Grand Concourse at 165th Street and ran down Melrose Avenue to 149th Street.

Along the way, connections to the New York City Subway can be made at:

- Third Avenue–138th Street (6 and <6> trains)
- 138th Street–Grand Concourse (4 and 5 trains; Bx1 only)
- Third Avenue–149th Street (2 and 5 trains; Bx2 only)
- 149th Street–Grand Concourse (2, 4, and 5 trains)
- 161st Street–Yankee Stadium (4, B, and D trains)
- Bedford Park Boulevard (B and D trains)
- Mosholu Parkway (4 train; select northbound Bx2 buses terminate there)
- 231st Street (1 train; Bx1 and some weekday southbound and Sunday-morning Bx2 buses)
- Fordham Road station (B and D trains; select northbound Bx1 buses terminate there)

As of September 2010, the Bx1 operates as a limited-stop service during the daytime on weekdays and Saturdays, while the Bx2 serves as the local. Before September 2010, both routes had a limited-stop variant.

=== School trippers ===
When school is in session, three extra southbound trips operate from Paul Avenue near the Bronx High School of Science to 165th Street. Departing at 2:40, 3:25, and 3:35pm, these trips operate as the Bx1 but make local stops.

== History ==
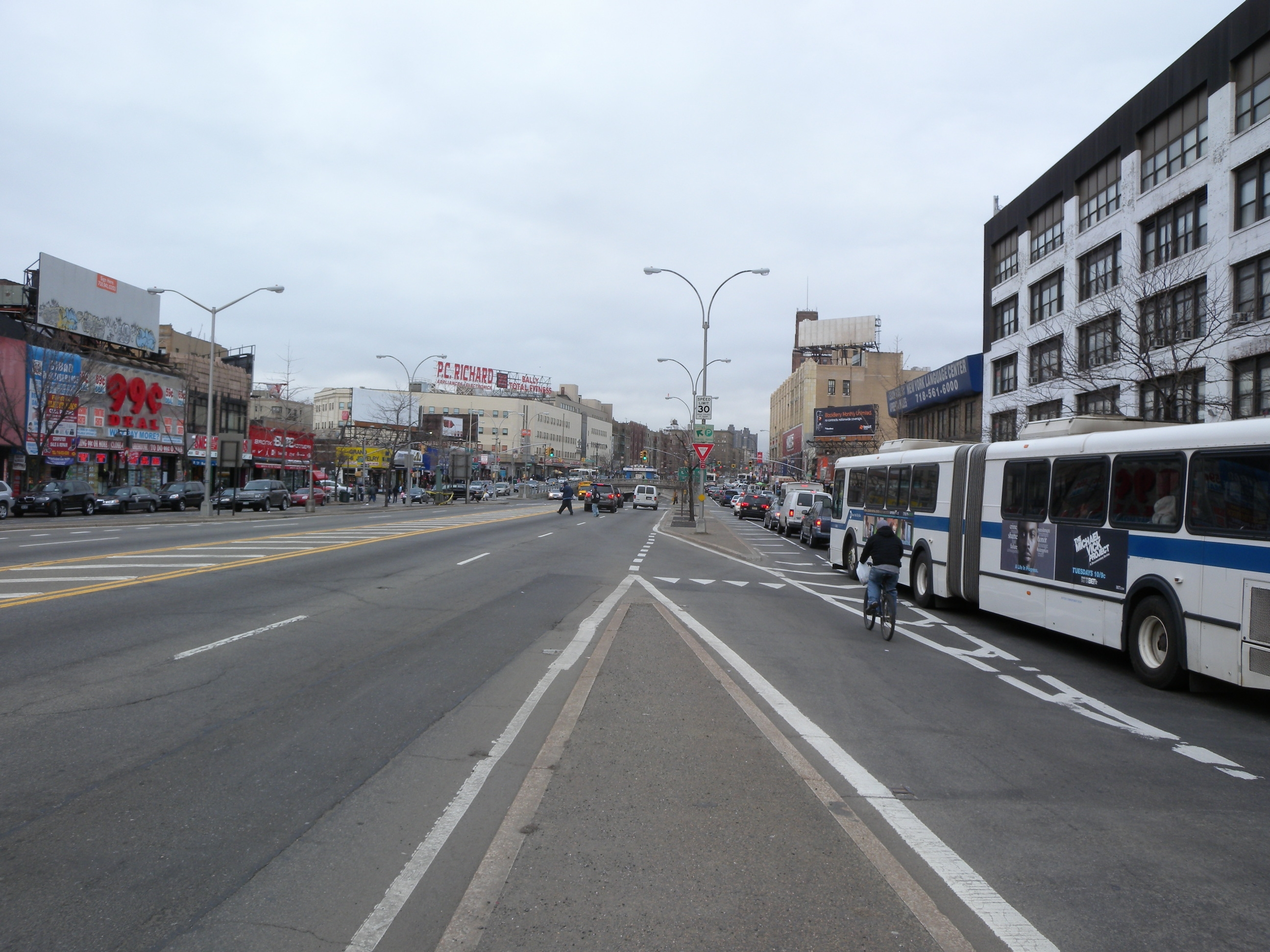
A New Flyer D60HF on the Bx1 or Bx2 at Grand Concourse/East 187th Street

=== Early history ===
Concourse Bus Line, Inc. was incorporated in early July 1921 by Major Emit Leindorf, deputy police commissioner in charge of motor transport under Mayor Hylan. The company soon began operating on the Grand Concourse as part of Hylan's "emergency bus lines". The Third Avenue Railway obtained an injunction against the operation on early March 1923, leading the city to assign two franchises to the company in mid-April, from Grand Concourse and Mosholu Parkway south to Fifth Avenue (Harlem, Manhattan) and Melrose Avenue and 150th Street (The Hub, Bronx). Along with a route to the Rockaways, the Concourse service was one of only two of Hylan's lines unaffected by a July 1923 injunction, since they had franchises, but were discontinued anyway by September 1924 due to the failure of the five-cent fare to pay the costs.

The franchises were reassigned to the Fifth Avenue Coach Company, which began operating the routes on October 11, 1924, for ten cents. (The Manhattan line had been truncated to 138th Street in the Bronx.) On September 14, 1927, the routes (Bx1 and Bx2 respectively) were again reassigned to the Surface Transportation Corporation, the bus subsidiary of the Third Avenue Railway, as two of its initial twelve routes. In April 1928, the original terminus was at Moshulu Parkway.

=== Late 20th century ===
The bankrupt Surface Transportation Corporation's routes were taken over by Fifth Avenue Coach Lines in 1956, and the New York City Transit Authority subsidiary Manhattan and Bronx Surface Transit Operating Authority acquired all of the Fifth Avenue Coach routes in 1962.

Southbound Bx2 service originally ran via Third Avenue between East 161st Street and The Hub-East 150th Street until July 1974. Some Bx2 trips also ran via Paul Avenue and Bedford Park Boulevard in both directions until July 1974, when the Bx1 took over this role. The original northwestern terminus of the Bx1 was at Broadway and 231st Street. The Bx1 was extended to Riverdale at West 246th Street in February 1984, and was later cut back to its current terminus in 1990 after the Bx7 started running all times except nights. Some Bx1 trips also ran via Paul Avenue and Bedford Park Boulevard in both directions until March 1993.

Limited-Stop service was introduced to the Bx1 on February 23, 1993 as a weekday rush hour-only service. Initially, it would have been implemented in January. This service improvement was put into place as part of the Fare Deal Ridership Growth Program. The change resulted in an increase in ridership. In July 1994, the Board approved a plan to expand the hours of limited-stop service to operate continuously between 6:30 a.m. and 7 p.m., and to introduce Bx2 limited-stop service, to go into effect in September 1994. In March 1995, all Sunday Bx1 service began running via the Grand Concourse north of Bedford Park Boulevard. Between 10 a.m. and 6 p.m. alternate buses had run along Paul Avenue and West 205th Street. This branch was underutilized, serving fewer than ten passengers, and the split in service underserved the Grand Concourse. Limited-stop service was eventually extended to run weekdays and Saturdays in September 1996. It also became the first route in the city to use articulated buses on September 30, 1996.

=== 21st century ===
In March 2002, the MTA announced it planned to revise service on the Bx1, Bx2, and Bx41 routes in Mott Haven by extending the Bx1 and Bx2 to a new terminal at Lincoln Avenue and East 138th Street and truncating the Bx41 to East 149th Street and Third Avenue. The Bx41 would have a terminal loop consisting of Third Avenue, East 146th Street, Willis Avenue, East 147th Street, and Third Avenue. At the time, the Bx1 had terminated at the 138th Street–Grand Concourse subway station, while the Bx2 had terminated at East 147th Street and Third Avenue near the Third Avenue–149th Street subway station. The changes were intended to improve service reliability on the Bx1 and Bx2 by consolidating route supervision at their new terminal. There was no dispatcher at Grand Concourse and East 138th Street, and without full supervision, trips were often out of order when they merged at Grand Concourse and East 165th Street. The truncation of the Bx41 made the changes cost-neutral and ensured there would not be too many buses in the vicinity of East 138th Street and Lincoln Avenue. About 1,000 Bx41 daily riders would need to transfer with the changes. The changes took effect on September 8, 2002.

Bx2 service ran along East 165th Street and Melrose Avenue until August 2008, when all buses started running at East 149th Street and Third Avenue.

On September 12, 2010, the Bx2 limited-stop service was eliminated, with all Bx2 buses running as locals. In addition, all Bx1s on weekdays between 6 a.m. and 6:30 p.m. and on Saturdays between 10 a.m. and 6 p.m. began operating as limiteds.

== See also ==
- IND Concourse Line, the subway line that runs along Grand Concourse.
