= Grand Concourse (Bronx) =

Boulevard in the Bronx, New York

- Grand Boulevard and Concourse
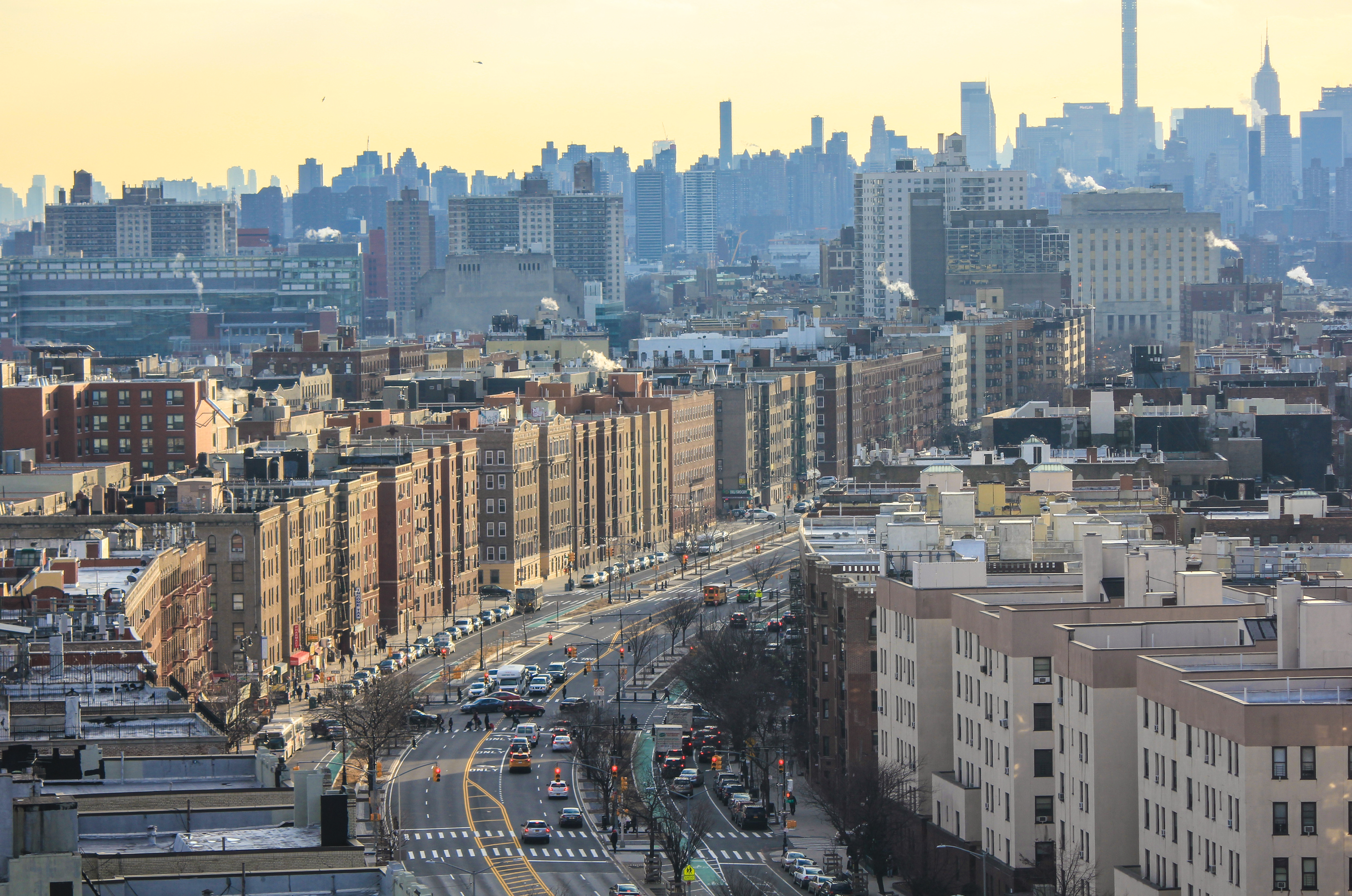
- Looking southward from 179th Street with Manhattan in the background
- Interactive map of Grand Concourse
- Owner: City of New York
- Maintained by: NYCDOT
- Length: 5.2 mi (8.4 km)
- Location: Bronx, New York City
- Nearest metro station: IND Concourse Line
- South end: I-87 / East 138th Street in Mott Haven
- North end: Mosholu Parkway in Bedford Park

Construction
- Construction start: 1894
- Completion: 1909

Other
- Designer: Louis Aloys Risse
- Grand Concourse Historic District
- U.S. National Register of Historic Places
- U.S. Historic district
- New York City Landmark
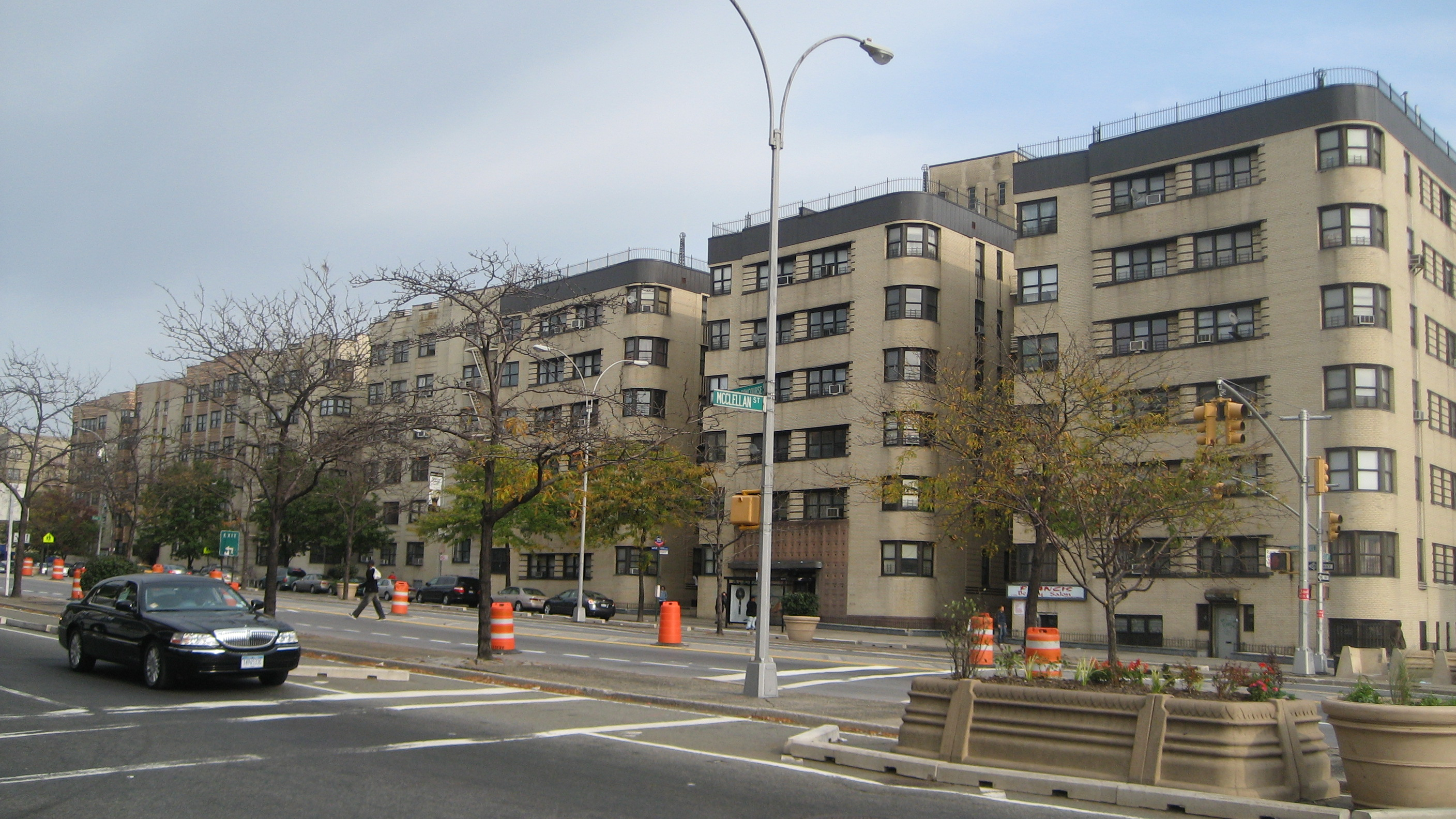
- Art Deco apartment buildings along Grand Concourse

- Location within New York City
- Location: The Bronx, New York
- Coordinates: 40°49′50″N 73°55′15″W
- Architectural style: Late 19th and 20th Century Revivals, Art Deco
- NRHP reference No.: 87001388
- NYCL No.: 2403

Significant dates
- Added to NRHP: August 24, 1987
- Designated NYCL: October 25, 2011

The Grand Concourse (also known as the Grand Boulevard and Concourse) is a 5.2-mile-long (8.4 km) thoroughfare in the borough of the Bronx in New York City. Grand Concourse runs through several neighborhoods, including Bedford Park, Concourse, Highbridge, Fordham, Mott Haven, Norwood and Tremont. For most of its length, the Concourse is 180 feet (55 m) wide, though portions of the Concourse are narrower.

The Grand Concourse was designed by Louis Aloys Risse, an immigrant from Saint-Avold, Lorraine, France. Risse first conceived of the road in 1890, and the Concourse was built between 1894 and 1909, with an additional extension in 1927. The development of the Concourse led to the construction of apartment buildings (a plurality of six-story high-class semi-fireproof elevator apartment houses was perceptibly interspersed with buildings that ranged from a more affordable tier of five-story New Law walk-up apartment houses to a handful of taller fireproof apartment houses comparable to those on Manhattan's luxury thoroughfares) surrounding the boulevard. By 1939, it was called "the Park Avenue of middle-class Bronx residents". A period of decline followed in the 1960s and 1970s, when these residences became dilapidated and the Concourse was redesigned to be more motorist-friendly. Renovation and redevelopment started in the 1980s, and a portion of the Grand Concourse was reconstructed starting in the 2000s.

The southern portion of the Grand Concourse is surrounded by several historically important residential buildings, which were listed on the National Register of Historic Places in 1987 as part of the Grand Concourse Historic District. In 2011, the New York City Landmarks Preservation Commission designated numerous buildings around the Grand Concourse as part of a city landmark district. Additionally, several individual points of interest are located on or near the Concourse, including the Bronx Museum of the Arts and Edgar Allan Poe Cottage.

== Description ==
The Grand Concourse's southern terminus is at East 138th Street. Shortly afterward, it merges with the entrance ramp to southbound Major Deegan Expressway (I-87), as well as the exit ramp from northbound I-87. The Grand Concourse continues as a divided eight-lane avenue, with two to three traffic lanes in each direction, until East 161st Street. North of there, the service roads in each direction begin, and a unidirectional buffered bike lane runs on the left edge of either service road. The Grand Concourse is briefly a ten-lane boulevard with four roadways, two in each direction, until just south of 165th Street. There, the northbound and southbound inner roadways merge into a five-lane undivided roadway with two lanes in each direction and a left-turn lane and painted median in the center. The buffered bike lanes on each service road end at East 171st Street, and conventional bike lanes start on the right lane of the respective service roads. This configuration with three roadways (two service roads and one main road) continues north until Mosholu Parkway, where the Grand Concourse ends. At Fordham Road, the main road passes underneath in a grade-separated junction, while the service roads intersect with Fordham Road.

== Transportation ==
Grand Concourse is served by the following subway lines:

- Between approximately 161st and 204th Streets, the New York City Subway's IND Concourse Line (B and D trains) runs under the Grand Concourse.
- The IRT Jerome Avenue Line (4 and 5 trains) runs underneath the boulevard for a short section south of 149th Street, which includes the 149th Street–Grand Concourse station complex (2, 4, and 5 trains).

The following bus routes serve the corridor:

- Local service is provided by the Bx1 along its entire length.
- Express service is provided by the BxM4 south of Van Cortlandt Avenue East, with no stops made south of East 158th Street.
- The Bx2 provides additional local service north of East 149th Street.

== History ==
=== Construction ===
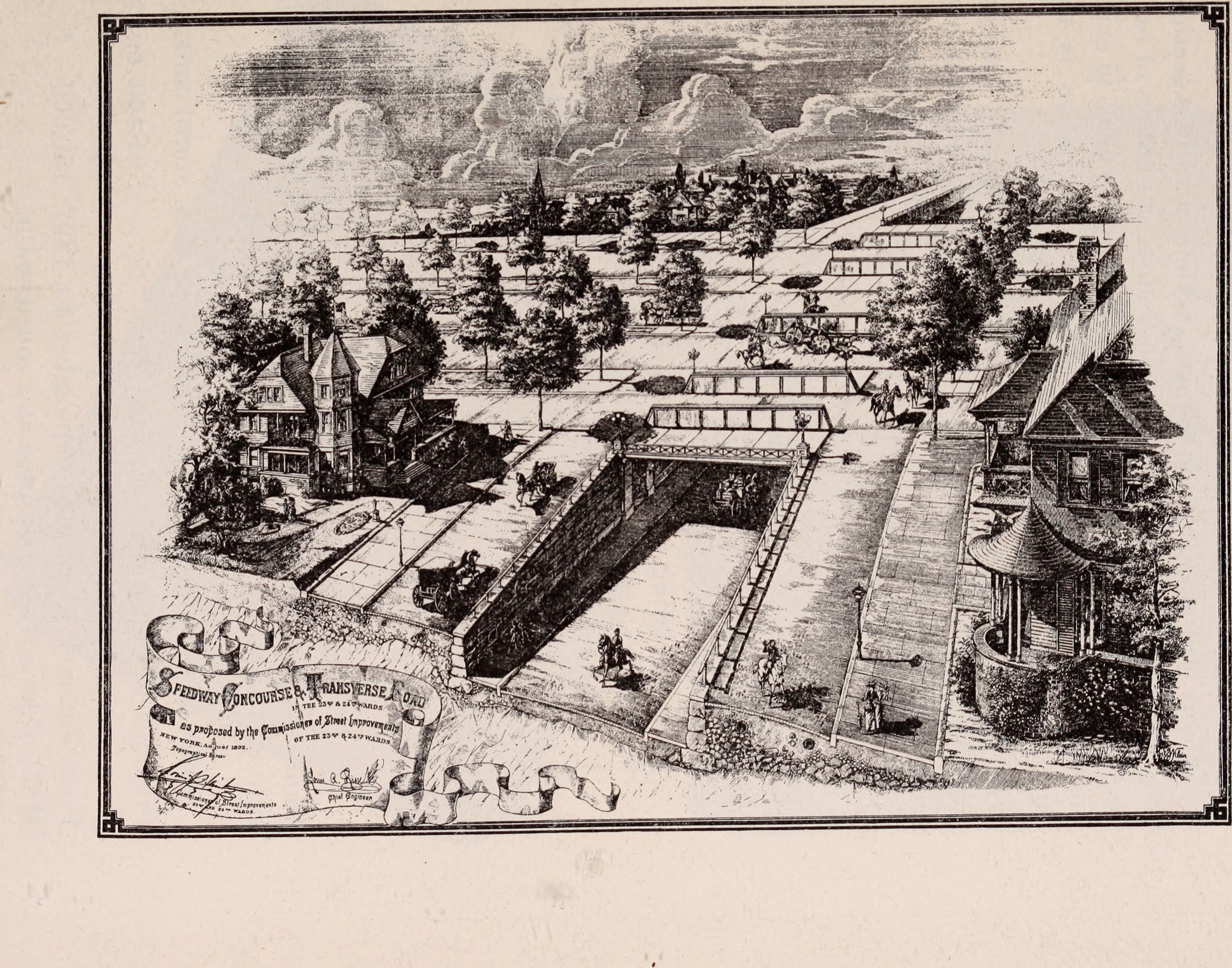
Intersection plan, 1892

Risse first conceived of the road in 1890, as a means of connecting the borough of Manhattan to the northern Bronx. Construction began on the Grand Concourse in 1894 and it was opened to traffic in November 1909. Built during the height of the City Beautiful movement, it was modeled on the Champs-Élysées in Paris but is considerably larger, stretching four miles (6 km) in length, measuring 180 feet (55 m) across, and separated into three roadways by tree-lined dividers, so some minor streets did not cross the Concourse. The cost of the project was $14 million (worth $541,800,000 today).

The Grand Concourse originally stretched from Bronx Borough Hall at 161st Street north to Van Cortlandt Park. It was expanded southward to 138th Street in 1927 after Mott Avenue was widened to accommodate the boulevard. Evidence of the Grand Concourse extension's old name is present at the 149th Street–Grand Concourse station, where there are signs reading "Mott Avenue".

=== Development ===
The Interborough Rapid Transit Company's Jerome Avenue Line opened a few blocks west of the Grand Concourse in 1917, initiating a housing boom amongst upwardly mobile, predominantly Jewish and Italian, families who were fleeing the crowded tenements of Manhattan. In 1923, Yankee Stadium opened near the Grand Concourse at 161st Street, down the hill from the Concourse Plaza Hotel. South of Fordham Road, the palatial Loew's Paradise theater, one of the Loew's Wonder Theatres and at one time the largest movie theater in New York City, was constructed in 1929.

Development of the Concourse was further encouraged by the opening of the Independent Subway System's Concourse Line in 1933. By the mid-1930s, almost three hundred apartment buildings had been built along the Concourse. Customarily five or six stories high with wide entrance courtyards bordered with grass and shrubs, among these apartments are many of the finest examples of Art Deco and Art Moderne architecture in the United States. Even though the Great Depression, which was happening at the time, ended the period of tremendous growth, privately financed apartment buildings continued to be constructed. Furthermore, work was done on the Grand Concourse as part of WPA programs. During this period, the Bronx had more amenities than other boroughs: in 1934, almost 99% of residences had private bathrooms, and 95% had central heating. In the 1939 WPA Guide to New York City, the Grand Concourse was described as "the Park Avenue of middle-class Bronx residents, and the lease to an apartment in one of its many large buildings is considered evidence of at least moderate business success."

=== Decline ===
In 1941, the New York City Planning Department proposed converting the boulevard into an expressway, in order to connect the Major Deegan Expressway and the proposed Park Avenue Expressway to the south with the Mosholu Parkway to the north. However, these plans were abandoned following the southern extension of the Bronx River Parkway in the 1940s and the extension of the Major Deegan Expressway to the north in the 1950s.

The south and central Bronx rapidly deteriorated in the 1960s, as there was general disinvestment in the region's real estate, exacerbated by urban renewal and redlining programs. Many white residents of the South Bronx left for suburban areas in a process known as white flight; they were helped by the construction of the Interstate Highway System. At the same time, African Americans and Puerto Ricans were moving to the Bronx for blue-collar jobs; however, these jobs were increasingly being shifted to the suburbs, the Southern United States, and other countries. Racial discrimination against these demographic groups prevented them from moving to the suburbs, forcing them into deteriorating urban housing stock. The buildings around the Concourse thus came to be perceived as old and low-rent, and subsequent cycles of disinvestment led landlords on the Concourse to pay decreasingly less attention to their housing stock, while banks and insurance companies failed to give financial support to these neighborhoods. Further outward migration between 1968 and 1970 drained the areas along the Grand Concourse of most of its remaining middle-class residents. Many buildings in the area were damaged by arson, vandalism, and a lack of maintenance.

The road itself was modified to be more hospitable to motorists. During the 1960s, the New York City Department of Parks and Recreation removed the grass median on the Concourse and replaced it with cement that was painted green. By the 1980s, The New York Times characterized the Concourse as "a driver’s paradise". Traffic lights were timed so that motorists received a "green wave", moving through multiple intersections per light cycle. Meanwhile, pedestrian crossings and trees were eliminated, and green highway signs were placed on the Concourse.

=== Restoration ===
During the 1980s, landlords along the Concourse and elsewhere in the South Bronx began rehabilitating their buildings. The Bronx Museum of the Arts, was one of the institutions to move to the area, relocating in 1982 to a former synagogue at Grand Concourse and 167th Street. The city created the "Special Grand Concourse Preservation District" in 1989 to preserve the character of residential buildings on the Concourse. This led to new building developments on the Concourse starting in the 1990s, including the Rafael Viñoly-designed Bronx Housing Courthouse at 1118 Grand Concourse. In addition, basement stores started opening on the Concourse in the 1980s, serving the predominantly minority communities around the boulevard. By 2003, a New York Times writer observed that "every block between 161st Street and 196th Street now has a grocery, a barber shop, a travel agency or a medical clinic".

==== Boulevard reconstruction ====
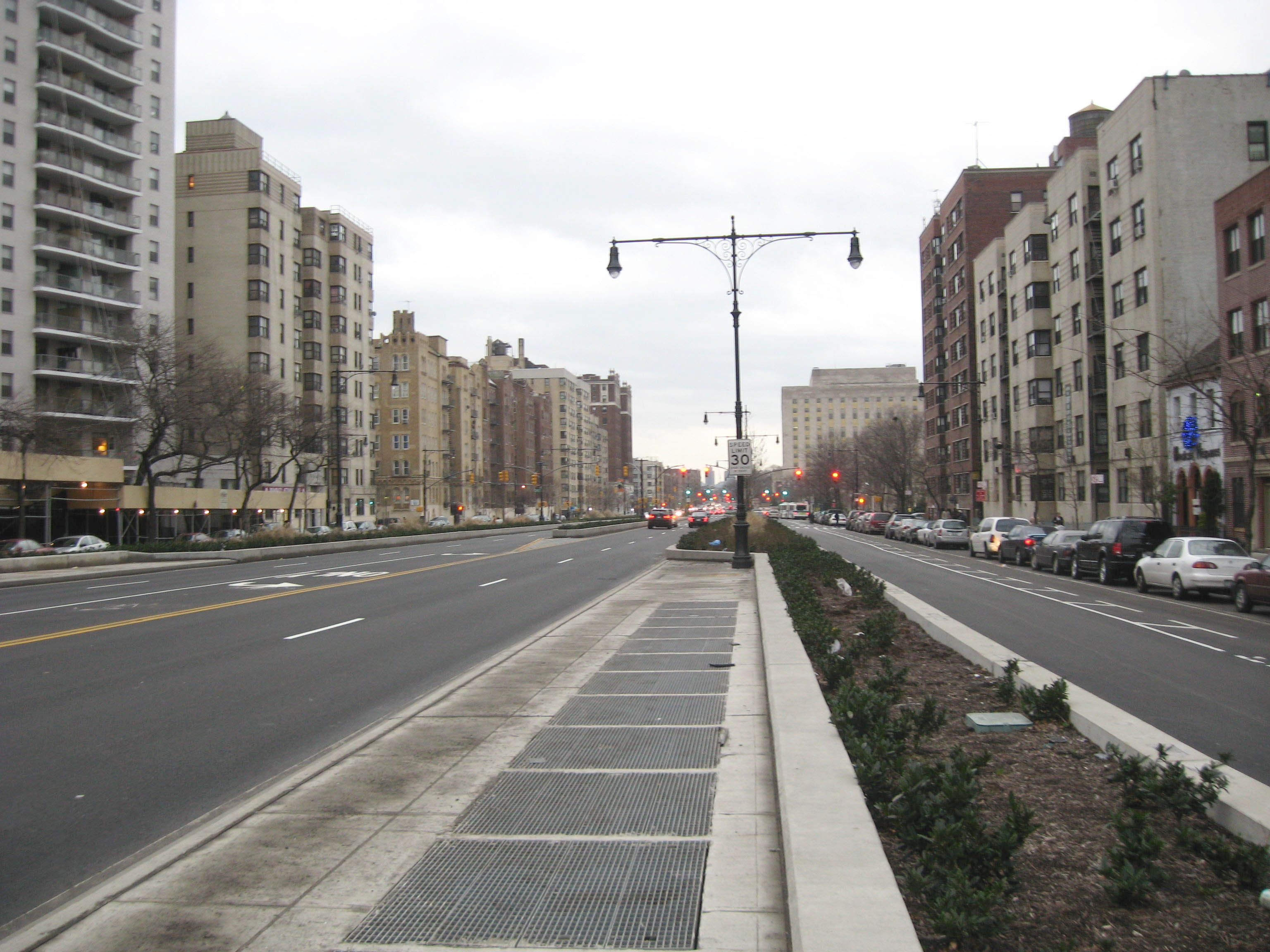
Renovated intersection with 161st Street in 2008

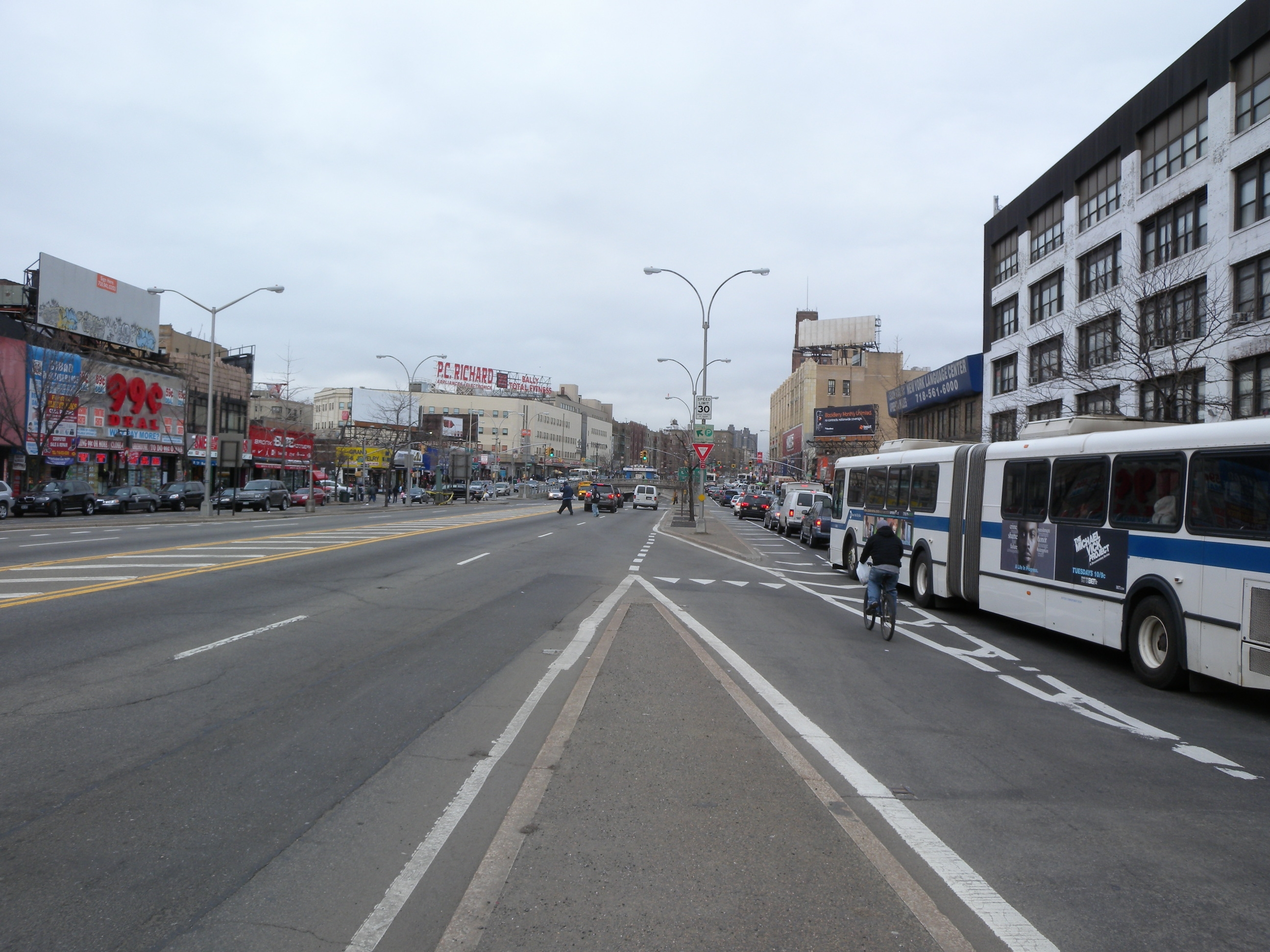
Unrenovated section at East 187th Street

By the early 1990s, politicians and community advocates strove to make the Concourse more usable for pedestrians. At that time, the Concourse was one of the most dangerous streets in New York City, with twelve pedestrians dying in 1991, rivaling the reputation of Queens Boulevard as the "Boulevard of Death". In 1992, the New York City Department of Transportation (NYCDOT) conducted a study of the Grand Concourse, which resulted in improvements such as left-turn signals; pedestrian barriers; roadway markings; repainted crosswalks; and new and improved signage. These improvements continued along the entire corridor through 2006. As an experiment, the NYCDOT also completely rebuilt the section between 161st Street and 167th Streets starting in 1999, as a "demonstration" project. The Grand Concourse underwent an $18 million restoration and landscaping to widen and landscape the medians; improve lighting; add new signage; build pedestrian planters in the medians; and add bike lanes. This resulted in a 69% drop in accidents along this section between 1998 and 2005. The final part of the demonstration project was completed in 2008.

Following the success of the "demonstration" reconstruction, the NYCDOT unveiled a four-phase capital project between 161st Street and Fordham Road as part of a capital project, which would receive funding directly from the city. The demonstration project was the first phase of the capital project. A reconstruction of the Grand Concourse between 166th and 171st Street began in 2013 and was finished in June 2017. Funding is being allocated for a reconstruction of the Grand Concourse from 171st Street to 175th Street, which is already in planning. In January 2017, the New York City Department of Transportation started planning for a fourth phase, which will renovate the section between 175th Street and Fordham Road.

==== Gentrification ====
Because of its attractive art deco buildings and close proximity to Manhattan, the southern portion has been experiencing gentrification and is drawing many young professionals to the area. Since the 2000s, the area around the Grand Concourse has been the center of what real estate agents are calling a “renewal", with new residents moving in, and severe crime rates having decreased significantly. The New York Times cited several residents who believed that, while the region would experience demographic changes, it would be working-class, “community-oriented” people, as opposed to the richer individuals that have gentrified other neighborhoods of the city.

Examples of gentrification on the lower Grand Concourse include the high-rises 425 Grand Concourse and 276 Grand Concourse, which have doormen, gyms, garages, and rooftop terraces for their residents.

== Significant buildings ==
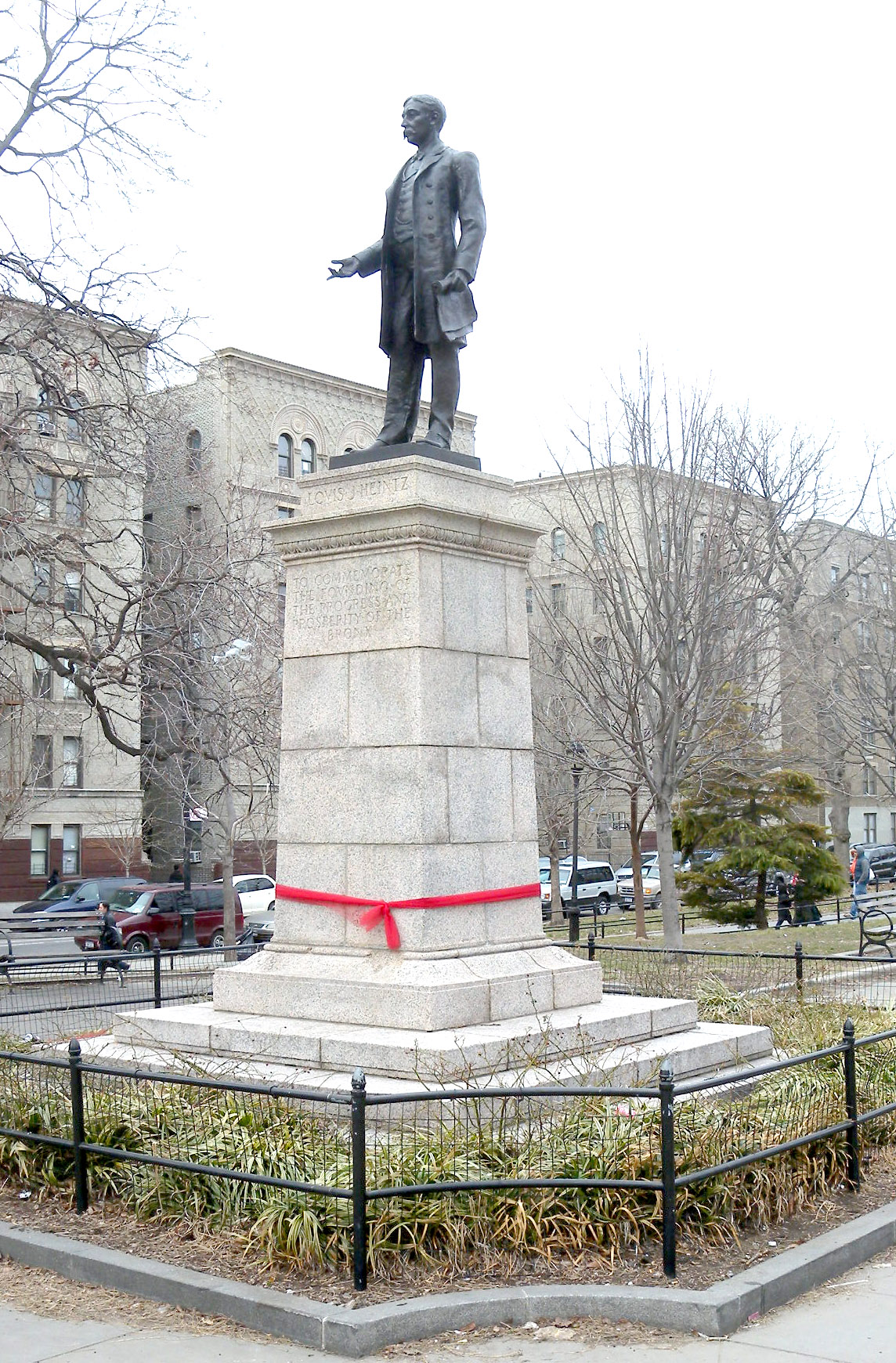
Louis J Heintz, promoter of Grand Concourse, in Kilmer Park

Several buildings of importance to New York City and the Bronx, both because of their history and their current use, are located along the Grand Concourse. There are also numerous structures designated as New York City Landmarks (NYCL) and National Register of Historic Places (NRHP) on the Concourse. From south to north (in increasing address order), they include:

- 500 Grand Concourse - Hostos Community College, not a historically designated site, but an important element in the Nuyorican history of the city.
- 558 Grand Concourse – Bronx General Post Office (NRHP, NYCL; built 1935-1937; architect Thomas Harlan Ellett). The interior includes a notable series of New Deal-era murals in fresco created in 1939 by Ben Shahn and Bernarda Bryson Shahn.
- 851 Grand Concourse – The Bronx County Courthouse (NRHP, NYCL; built 1931-1934; architect Joseph H. Freelander and Max Hausle)
- 1040 Grand Concourse – The Bronx Museum of the Arts (built 1961, converted to museum 1982, addition 2006)
- 1125 Grand Concourse – Andrew Freedman Home (NYCL; built 1924; architect Friedlander Jacobs), later converted into a small hotel
- 1150 Grand Concourse – The Fish Building (built 1937)
- 2403 Grand Concourse – Loew's Paradise Theater (NYCL; built 1929)
- 2516-2530 Grand Concourse – Dollar Savings Bank Building (NRHP, NYCL; built 1932–33, 1937–38, and 1949–52; architect Adolf L. Muller of Halsey, McCormack & Helmer). The 10-story headquarters of the Dollar Dry Dock Savings Banks (now liquidated), it contains a clock tower at its top.
- 2640 Grand Concourse – Poe Cottage, the last home of Edgar Allan Poe (NRHP, NYCL; built 1812; architect John Wheeler)

=== Grand Concourse Historic District ===
In 2011, the New York City Landmarks Preservation Commission designated the Grand Concourse from 153rd to 167th Streets as part of the Grand Concourse Historic District. The State of New York had previously nominated the buildings at 730–1000, 1100–1520, 1560, and 851–1675 Grand Concourse for listing on the National Register of Historic Places as a historic district.

== In popular culture ==
- On the 1970s hit sitcom Rhoda, Rhoda Morgenstern's parents Martin and Ida Morgenstern lived on the Grand Concourse. The historic 1974 episode "Rhoda's Wedding" showed actress Valerie Harper (as Rhoda) running through the Bronx in her wedding gown, and running across the Grand Concourse into her parents' building. It was shot on location.
- The Fordham Road-Concourse area and Krum's soda fountain are featured in Avery Corman's The Old Neighborhood novel.
- In Jacob M. Appel's story, "The Grand Concourse" (2007), a woman who grew up in the Lewis Morris Building returns to the Morrisania neighborhood with her adult daughter to discover the boulevard is far from how she remembers it.
- In Ayn Rand's Novel, "The Fountainhead," Peter Keating and Dominique Francon are driving to Connecticut to find a judge and get married. She tells him, "Get to the Grand Concourse. Fewer lights there."

== See also ==
- 1100 Grand Concourse
- Paradise Theater

== Sources ==
- Gonzalez, Evelyn (2006). The Bronx. New York Chichester: Columbia University Press. ISBN 978-0-231-12115-6. OCLC 71238523.
- "Grand Concourse Historic District" (PDF). New York City Landmarks Preservation Commission. October 25, 2011.
- Rosenblum, Constance (2009). Boulevard of Dreams: Heady Times, Heartbreak, and Hope along the Grand Concourse in the Bronx. NYU Press. ISBN 978-0-8147-7636-0.
