= 149th Street–Hostos station =

New York City Subway station in the Bronx

149 Street–Hostos
- New York City Subway station complex
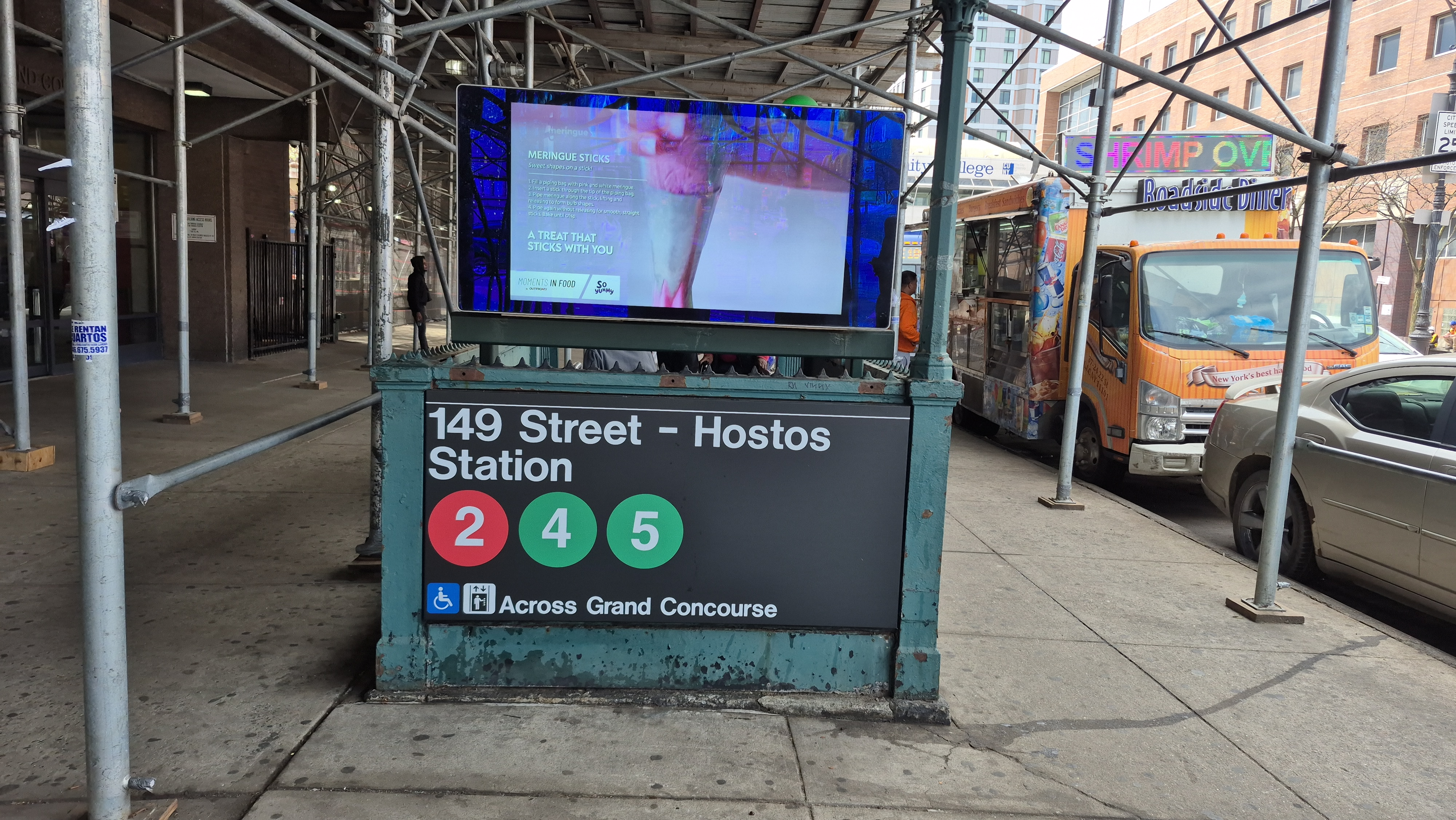
- New station entrance sign in 2026

Station statistics
- Address: East 149th Street & Grand Concourse; Bronx, New York
- Borough: The Bronx
- Locale: Mott Haven, Melrose, Concourse
- Coordinates: 40.8181°N 73.9275°W
- Division: A (IRT)
- Line: IRT Jerome Avenue Line; IRT White Plains Road Line
- Services: 2 (all times); 4 (all times); 5 (all except late nights)
- Transit: NYCT Bus: Bx1, Bx2, Bx19; Bx13 (on River Avenue)
- Levels: 2

Other information
- Accessible: Yes
- Former/other names: 149th Street–Grand Concourse

Traffic
- 2025: 2,533,664
- Rank: 148 out of 423
Location
Location within New York City Subway
Location within New York City
Location within New York
Street map
Station service legend
Symbol	Description
Stops all times except late nights	Stops all times except late nights
Stops all times	Stops all times

The 149th Street–Hostos station (formerly the 149th Street–Grand Concourse station) is a New York City Subway station complex shared by the IRT Jerome Avenue Line and the IRT White Plains Road Line. It is located at East 149th Street and Grand Concourse in Mott Haven, Melrose and Concourse in the Bronx. The complex is served by the 2 and 4 trains at all times, and by the 5 train at all times except late nights.

== History ==
=== First subway ===
Planning for a subway line in New York City dates to 1864. However, development of what would become the city's first subway line did not start until 1894, when the New York State Legislature passed the Rapid Transit Act. The subway plans were drawn up by a team of engineers led by William Barclay Parsons, the Rapid Transit Commission's chief engineer. It called for a subway line from New York City Hall in lower Manhattan to the Upper West Side, where two branches would lead north into the Bronx. A plan was formally adopted in 1897, and legal challenges were resolved near the end of 1899. The Rapid Transit Construction Company, organized by John B. McDonald and funded by August Belmont Jr., signed the initial Contract 1 with the Rapid Transit Commission in February 1900, in which it would construct the subway and maintain a 50-year operating lease from the opening of the line. In 1901, the firm of Heins & LaFarge was hired to design the underground stations. Belmont incorporated the Interborough Rapid Transit Company (IRT) in April 1902 to operate the subway.

The 149th Street–Mott Avenue station was constructed as part of the connection between the IRT's East Side Branch (now the Lenox Avenue Line) and the West Farms Branch (now the White Plains Road Line). This connection was constructed in two phases: section 9A, west of Gerard Avenue in the Bronx, and section 9B, east of Gerard Avenue. McMullen and McBean were hired to build section 9A on September 10, 1901, while J. C. Rodgers & Son were hired to build section 9B on June 13, 1901.

The 8,000-foot-long (2,400 m) section 9 began at 135th Street and Lenox Avenue in Manhattan, ran under the Harlem River, and surfaced in the Bronx at Melrose Avenue. In the portions of this double track section not beneath the river, three types of construction (standard steel frame, reinforced concrete, and concrete arch) were used. Twin cast-iron tunnels were built under the Harlem River tunnel; each measured 450 feet (140 m) long, with an interior diameter of 14 feet (4.3 m), and were connected by a vertical cast iron diaphragm. The two tubes were surrounded by a layer of concrete measuring at least 1 foot (0.30 m) thick, while the roof was covered by a layer of concrete 2.5 feet (0.76 m) thick. An order issued by the United States War Department required that the top of the subway tunnel be at least 20 feet (6.1 m) below the tide level of the river. As a result, the tubes sloped downward at a 3 percent grade on either side of the river; these were the steepest sections of track built in Contract 1. Since the river bed contained clay, silt, and irregular rock, it could not be excavated using a conventional shield. Instead, the contractor suggested building a submerged rectangular cofferdam extending from the shore to the middle of the river, then excavating the riverbed and constructing the tunnel one half at a time. The Chief Engineer of the Rapid Transit Commission agreed to permit this method of tunnel construction, and work on the Harlem River tunnel began from the west side of the river in June 1901.

The Mott Avenue station itself was built using cut-and-cover construction, since the poor composition of the rock in the area made it difficult for contractors to excavate the station using rock tunneling. The roof of the station was constructed as a massive concrete arch. The connection between the IRT White Plains Road Line and the IRT Lenox Avenue Line, including the 149th Street station, opened on July 10, 1905. Trains from the newly opened IRT subway ran via the line. Initially, the station was served by East Side express trains, which had their southern terminus at South Ferry and had their northern terminus at 145th Street or West Farms (180th Street). In 1906, West Farms express trains began operating through to Atlantic Avenue in Brooklyn.

To address overcrowding, in 1909, the New York Public Service Commission proposed lengthening the platforms at stations along the original IRT subway. As part of a modification to the IRT's construction contracts made on January 18, 1910, the company was to lengthen station platforms to accommodate ten-car express and six-car local trains. In addition to $1.5 million (equivalent to $51.8 million in 2025) spent on platform lengthening, $500,000 (equivalent to $17.3 million in 2025) was spent on building additional entrances and exits. It was anticipated that these improvements would increase capacity by 25 percent. Both platforms at the 149th Street station were extended 130 feet (40 m) to the east. On January 23, 1911, ten-car express trains began running on the West Farms Branch. The platforms at the Mott Avenue station were only eight cars long.

=== Dual Contracts ===
The Dual Contracts, which were signed on March 19, 1913, were contracts for the construction and/or rehabilitation and operation of rapid transit lines in the City of New York. The contracts were "dual" in that they were signed between the City and two separate private companies (the Interborough Rapid Transit Company and the Brooklyn Rapid Transit Company), all working together to make the construction of the Dual Contracts possible. The Dual Contracts promised the construction of several lines in the Bronx. As part of Contract 3, the IRT agreed to build an elevated line along Jerome Avenue in the Bronx.

The Jerome Avenue Line station opened as part of the initial section of the line to Kingsbridge Road on June 2, 1917. Service was initially operated as a shuttle between Kingsbridge Road and 149th Street. Through service to the IRT Lexington Avenue Line began on July 17, 1918. The line was completed with a final extension to Woodlawn on April 15, 1918. This section was initially served by shuttle service, with passengers transferring at 167th Street. On August 1, 1918, the Broadway–Seventh Avenue Line opened south of Times Square–42nd Street, thereby dividing the original IRT line into an H-shaped system. Through service began on the new east and west side trunk lines. In 1920, a project to extend the Mott Avenue station platforms 230 feet (70 m) to the west to provide a connection with a proposed station on the New York Central Railroad was completed.

=== Post-unification ===
The Mott Avenue station became the Grand Concourse–149th Street station on March 13, 1934, after Mott Avenue was renamed the Grand Concourse. The city government took over the IRT's operations on June 12, 1940. The IRT routes were given numbered designations with the introduction of "R-type" rolling stock. These fleet contained rollsigns with numbered designations for each service. The first such fleet, the R12, was put into service in 1948. The route from the Broadway–Seventh Avenue Line to the White Plains Road Line became known as the 2. The route from the Lexington Avenue Line to the Jerome Avenue Line became the 4, while the route from the Lexington Avenue Line to the White Plains Road Line became the 5. The New York City Transit Authority (NYCTA) announced plans in 1956 to add fluorescent lights above the edges of the Jerome Avenue Line station's platforms.

The original elevators to the White Plains Road Line platforms, and the areas near the elevators, were closed in 1975 due to security reasons. In 2013, several local institutions and groups of riders protested in support of restoring the elevators. In February 2014, the MTA initially stated in February 2014 that there were no plans to reopen the elevators since the station "was not a main station."

As part of the MTA's 2015–2019 Capital Program, all platforms at the 149th Street–Grand Concourse station received full ADA accessibility. In December 2015, the MTA planned to repair both elevators in addition to installing another one across the street. It was estimated that $45 million would go towards this previous elevator installation and repair plan.

By 2020, the MTA planned to rebuild one of the two original elevators so that it operates from the headhouse to the pedestrian overpass above the lower-level platforms, and build two new elevators with three stops. It was estimated that "over $50 million" would go towards this new installation and repair plan. Construction of the new elevators and the refurbishment of an existing elevator shaft started in August 2020 after a "preliminary design stage". The project also involved renovating the Mott Avenue Control House.

Substantial completion was initially projected for July 2023, but delays mounted. In March 2024, completion of the elevators had been pushed back to December 2024, and that November the projected completion date was again pushed back to March 2025. In December 2025, the opening of the elevators was pushed further back to 2026, with the MTA citing "unforeseen electrical distribution protection needs" with the complex's existing electrical distribution room. As of July 2026, the MTA was "wrapping up" the project, with plans to open the elevators later that summer. The station ultimately became accessible in September 2026.

In 2022, the New York State Legislature passed a bill to rename the station as 149th Street–Hostos station. Governor Kathy Hochul signed the bill into law on June 30, 2022. According to the bill's sponsor memorandum, the renaming was intended to recognize the importance and value of Hostos Community College to the South Bronx community and to further a sense of cultural identity and belonging in the area.

== Station layout ==
=== Exits ===
There are two exit stairs each to the southwest and southeast corners of 149th Street and Grand Concourse. On the southwest corner, there is also an elevator that runs between street level and the lower mezzanine. Hostos Community College is located outside both exits, and the Bronx General Post Office is across 149th Street from the southeast exit.

=== Elevators ===
When the station was first opened, the only way to exit the station was through two elevators. The elevators had four levels: one at the northbound lower-level platform, one at the level of a pedestrian overpass connecting the two lower-level platforms at their southern ends, one at the mezzanine of the upper-level platforms, and one at a street-level headhouse. When the elevators were opened up for service, they were considered state-of-the-art at the time, holding up to 20 people. The elevators closed in 1975.

As of 2020, the MTA planned to rebuild one of the two original elevators so that it operates from the headhouse to the pedestrian overpass above the lower-level platforms, and build two new elevators with three stops. One elevator would have stops at both Manhattan-bound platforms and the overpass, and the other would have stops at both northbound platforms and the overpass. A new fare control area would be built somewhere in the overpass level. Construction began after August 2020, and the elevators opened in September 2026 after more than three years of delays.

== IRT Jerome Avenue Line platforms ==
149 Street–Hostos
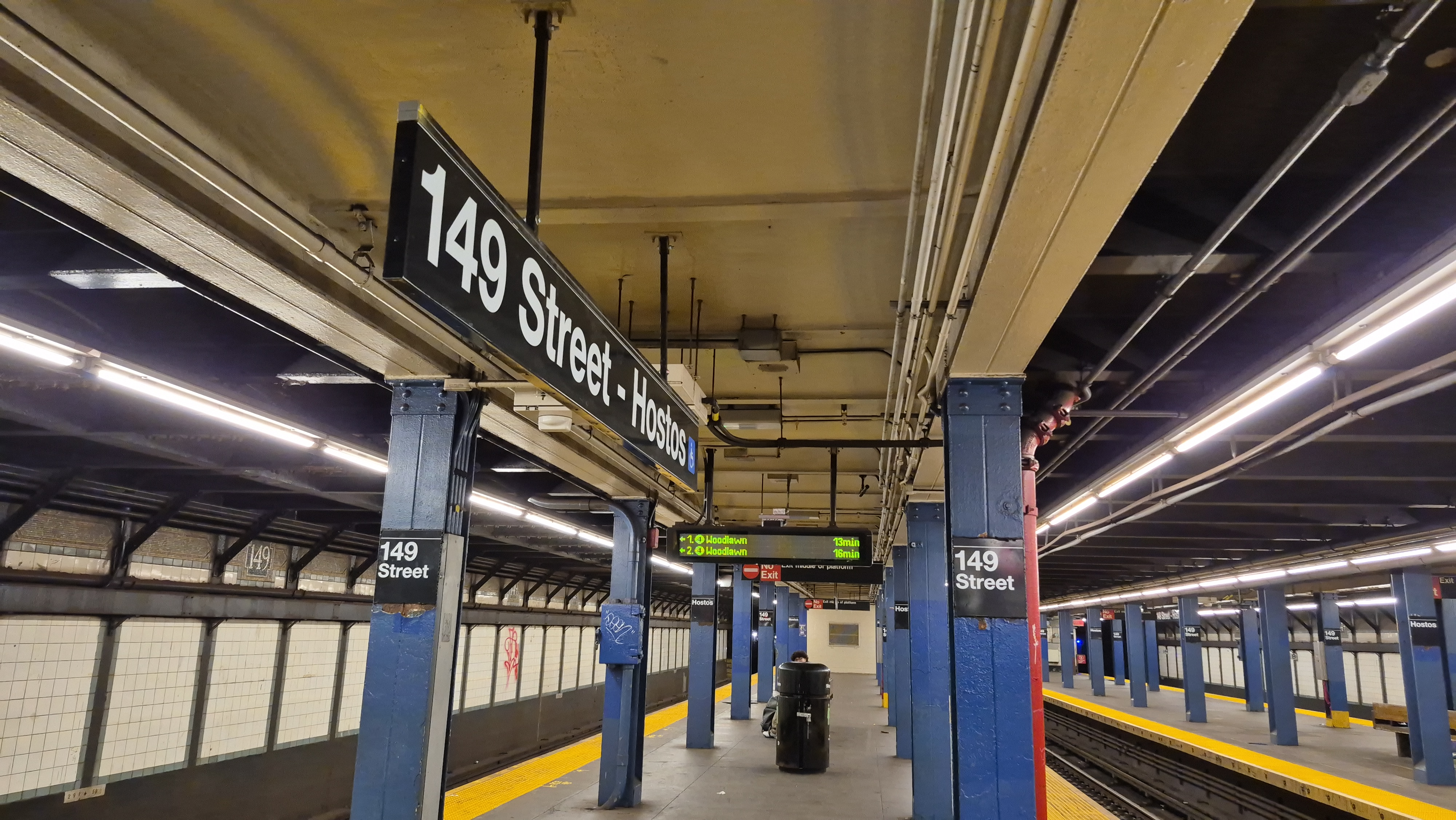
- View from the northbound platform

Station statistics
- Division: A (IRT)
- Line: IRT Jerome Avenue Line
- Services: 4 (all times)
- Structure: Underground
- Platforms: 2 island platforms cross-platform interchange
- Tracks: 3

Other information
- Opened: June 2, 1917; 109 years ago
- Accessible: Yes
- Former/other names: 149th Street–Grand Concourse
Services
Preceding station	New York City Subway	Following station
161st Street–Yankee Stadium 4 toward Woodlawn	4 (New York City Subway service)	125th Street 4 express
161st Street–Yankee Stadium 4 toward Woodlawn	4 (New York City Subway service)	138th Street–Grand Concourse 4 toward Crown Heights–Utica Avenue
Non-revenue services and lines
Preceding station	New York City Subway	Following station
Burnside Avenue express	no regular service	
Track layout
Station service legend
Symbol	Description
Stops all times except rush hours in the peak direction	Stops all times except rush hours in the peak direction
Stops all times	Stops all times
Stops rush hours in the peak direction only	Stops rush hours in the peak direction only

The 149th Street–Hostos station is an express station on the IRT Jerome Avenue Line that has three tracks and two island platforms, with the center track used only in the peak direction during rush hours. The station is served by the 4 at all times and is between 138th Street–Grand Concourse to the south and 161st Street–Yankee Stadium to the north. For southbound trains using the center track during the a.m. rush hour, the next stop is 125th Street.

This station is on the upper level of the two-level station complex, with a free transfer to the IRT White Plains Road Line on the lower level. The station was opened on June 2, 1917, and was the southern terminus of the Jerome Avenue Line until it was extended through Mott Haven Avenue into the Upper East Side extension of the IRT Lexington Avenue Line.

== IRT White Plains Road Line platforms ==
149 Street–Hostos
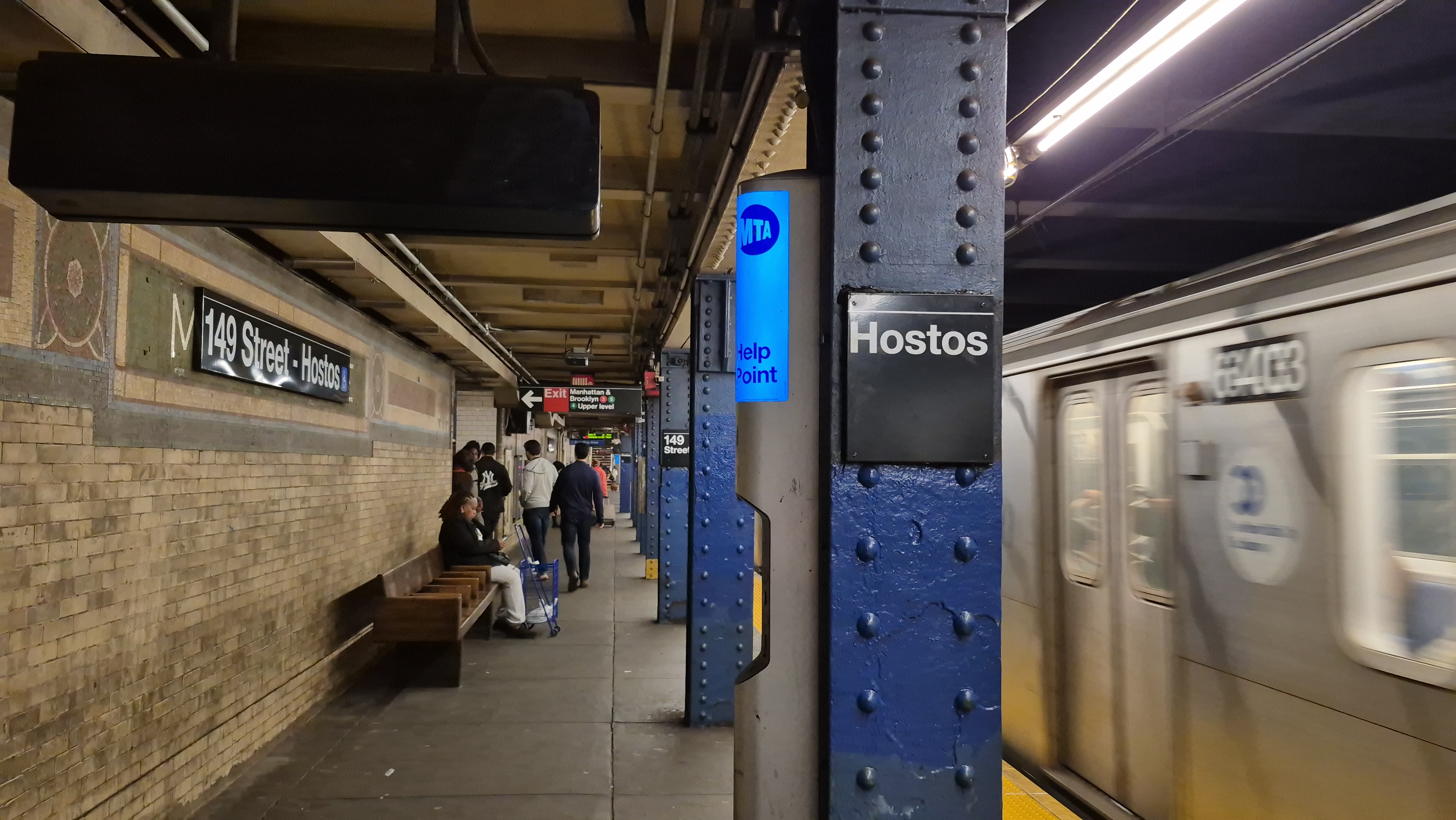
- View from the northbound platform

Station statistics
- Division: A (IRT)
- Line: IRT White Plains Road Line
- Services: 2 (all times); 5 (all times except late nights)
- Structure: Underground
- Platforms: 2 side platforms
- Tracks: 2

Other information
- Opened: July 10, 1905; 121 years ago
- Accessible: Yes
- Accessibility: Same-platform transfer available
- Former/other names: Mott Avenue, 149th Street–Grand Concourse
Services
Preceding station	New York City Subway	Following station
Third Avenue–149th Street 2 5 via East 180th Street	Local	135th Street 2 toward Flatbush Avenue–Brooklyn College
Third Avenue–149th Street 2 5 via East 180th Street	5 (New York City Subway service)	138th Street–Grand Concourse 5 toward Flatbush Avenue–Brooklyn College
Track layout
Station service legend
Symbol	Description
Stops all times except late nights	Stops all times except late nights
Stops all times	Stops all times
- Mott Avenue Control House
- U.S. National Register of Historic Places
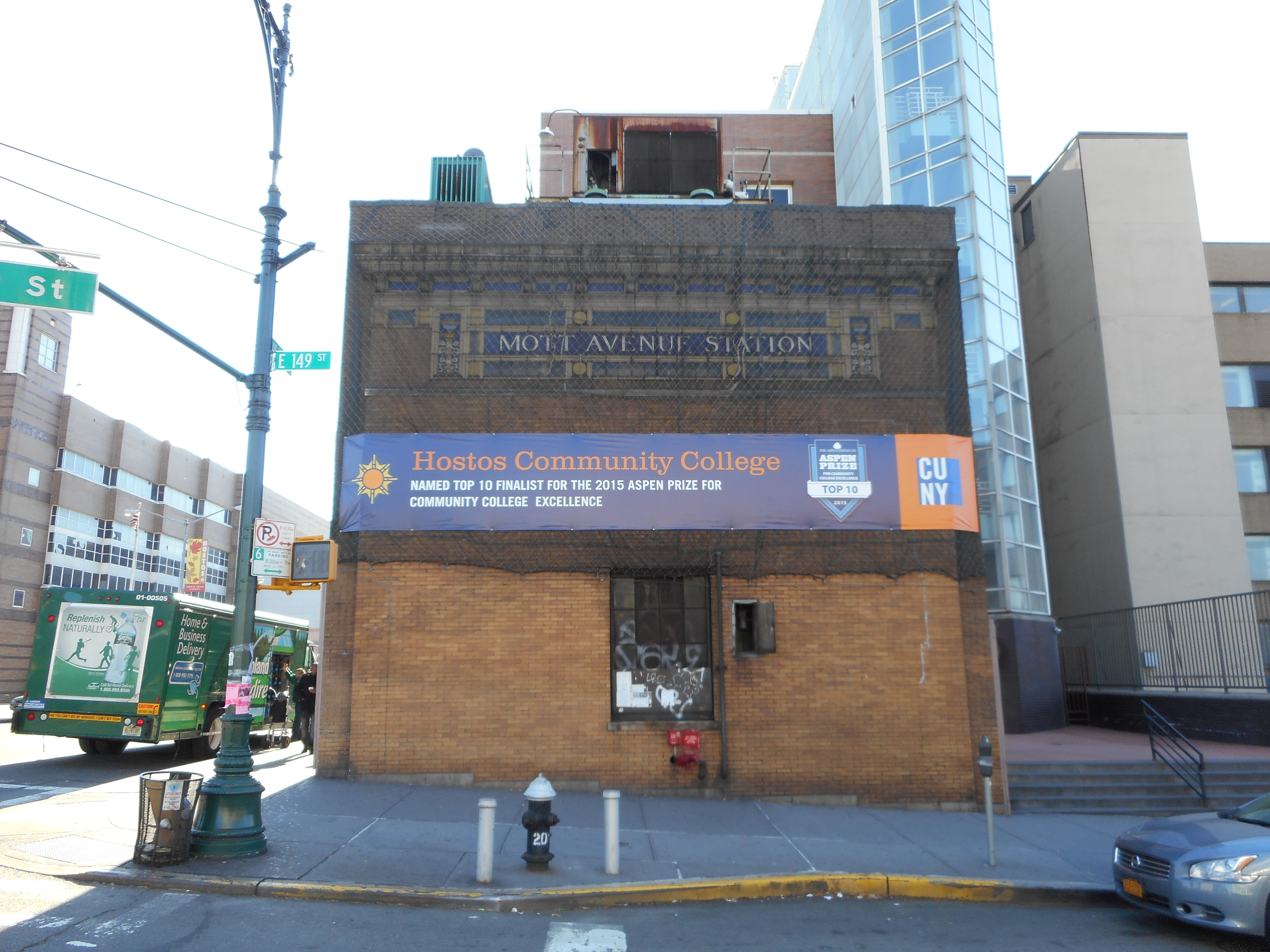
- Seen in November 2014
- MPS: New York City Subway System MPS
- NRHP reference No.: 80002590
- Added to NRHP: May 6, 1980

The 149th Street–Hostos station on the IRT White Plains Road Line has two tracks and two side platforms. The station is served by the 2 at all times and by the 5 except at night. The next stop to the west (railroad south) is 135th Street for 2 trains and 138th Street–Grand Concourse for 5 trains. The next stop to the east (railroad north) is Third Avenue–149th Street for all service.

The station is built at a deep level and contains arched ceilings, similar in design to those of 168th Street and 181st Street stations on the IRT Broadway–Seventh Avenue Line. As a result, it was initially only accessible by elevators. Unlike at other stations on the original IRT, there was an overpass connecting the two platforms.

Originally opened as the Mott Avenue station on July 10, 1905, 149th Street–Grand Concourse was the first subway station to be opened in the Bronx. The original headhouse is listed in the National Register of Historic Places.

Today, all of the original mosaic "Mott Avenue" name tablets have been covered over with metal "149 St–Hostos" signs. Only one name tablet, located on the downtown platform between the last two staircases at the northern end, remained uncovered and survived intact until a few years into the 21st century when a serious water leak after very heavy rainfall caused individual tiles to separate from the wall and fall off. There were no known plans by the MTA to repair or restore this name tablet. In late 2011, the MTA covered this name tablet with a metal "149 St–Grand Concourse" sign. Until 2002, there were no columns between the northbound and southbound tracks; thin supports for a communications conduit have since been installed.

West of the station are track connections to the IRT Jerome Avenue Line. The line splits and makes a sharp turn to merge with the Jerome Avenue Line just south of the upper level station. Due to high usage levels and the sharp turn of the connection, it often causes delays on the 5 train. The White Plains Road Line continues straight under the Harlem River and merges with the IRT Lenox Avenue Line at 142nd Street Junction.

=== Connection to unbuilt New York Central Railroad station ===
There are some remaining signs on the walls that point to a never-built station of the New York Central Railroad lines, now part of Metro-North Railroad. The station had been approved in 1908 and would have been located at 149th Street and Park Avenue, one block east. As part of the project, the eastern ends of the White Plains Line platforms were extended to the east, underpinning both the New York Central line and the IRT Third Avenue Line. The western ends of the platforms were truncated in 1918 to allow the construction of the track connection to the Jerome Avenue Line.
