= Wopo Holup =

American artist

Wopo Holup (April 2, 1937 – September 29, 2017) was an American artist known for her public art installations.

== Early life and education ==
She was born Phyllis Anna Holup to Henry and Ilean Hill Holup in San Diego in 1937. The nickname Wopo, which would become her professional name, was a mispronounced version of a name given to her by neighbors who were of Miwok descent.

Holup attended the San Francisco Art Institute, where she graduated in the class of 1965. In 1967 she completed her MFA from Mills College in Oakland.

== Career ==
=== Public art ===
Holup has had public art commissions installed in New York City, Denver, CO, Lowell, MA, New Brunswick, NJ and Kansas City, MO. Her artworks frequently embed natural imagery into the urban environment. She frequently spoke of her dedication to public art, especially in a public transit setting, telling the New York Times in 1989 that ''Putting art work in a subway station elevates the mundane experience of riding to work or to school.''

Her first major commissioned work, Triumph of Pegasus (1988), is a monumental bas-relief sculpture installed at a training center for blind and visually impaired people in New Jersey. Holup intended the sculpture to be touched, so it could provide equal engagement for people of all visual abilities. The relief sculpture depicts the mythological story of Pegasus doing battle with the Chimera. It was commissioned as a result of the State of New Jersey Public Building Arts Inclusion Act, and is constructed of black-pigmented cement polished with linseed oil.

Holup's most significant work is River That Flows Two Ways (2000), a series of 37 sculptural cast-iron and bronze panels installed as part of a railing on the waterfront at Battery Park. The panels frame the view beyond them, incorporating both the landscape of the city and the river into the artwork. They depict Lower Manhattan historical sites, like Trinity Church and Fort Amsterdam, juxtaposed with representations of the river and local wildlife. The artwork was commissioned by the Conservancy for Historic Battery Park and its $300,000 cost was funded by the Hanover Square Pilot Funds, the Greenacre Foundation, the New York State Environmental Protection Fund and the Starr Foundation.

The River, a 2007 work in Kansas City, also incorporates water imagery. The installation consists of a bronze and limestone inlay in the floor of the Shoal Creek police academy and patrol station, mapping the Missouri River between St. Louis and Kansas City.

Holup has many artworks installed in New York City's transit infrastructure, at sites including an underpass below the Brooklyn Queens Expressway, and elevated subway stations on the 1 line (formerly the IRT) between 125th Street in Upper Manhattan and 242nd Street in the Bronx.

=== Drawing and painting ===
Holup collaborated with Ntozake Shange on illustrations for a 1981 poetry chapbook titled Some Men.

Her drawing Mississippi Delta is in the collection of the Denver Art Museum. Holup's later-career artworks, shown in a posthumous exhibition at the Boulder Museum of Contemporary Art, were large-scale drawings in graphite on vellum, with gold and aluminum leaf. These drawings employ the river and waterway imagery that her public artworks also drew on.

== Selected artworks ==
- Triumph of Pegasus (1988), New Brunswick, NJ
- Elevated Nature (1991), New York City
- New Growth Forest (1999) Philadelphia Zoo
- River That Flows Two Ways (2000), New York City
- Common Ground (2005), Queens, New York
- Orchard Road Orchard (2006), Denver, CO
- The River (2007), Kansas City, MO
- The Gold Star Project (2008), New York City
- Phases of the Moon (2012), Vail, CO
- Colorado River (2016), Denver, CO
- St Vrain River (2016), Denver, CO

== Selected exhibitions ==
=== Solo exhibitions ===
- Wopo Holup. CUE Art Foundation, 2012.
- Wopo Holup: Endless Places, Present. Boulder Museum of Contemporary Art, 2018

=== Group exhibitions ===
- Abstract Landscape Colorado. Denver International Airport, 2016

== Personal life ==
Holup was married to Jack Brannon from 1954 until their divorce in 1966. Her second marriage was to William Morehouse, 1968-1978. Her 1984 marriage to artist Peter Brown lasted 33 years until her death.

She was a parishioner at Trinity Church in Lower Manhattan, and a member of its New Beginners seniors group.

Holup lived and worked in New York and Lyons, CO.
