= Norwood–205th Street station =

New York City Subway station in the Bronx

Norwood–205 Street
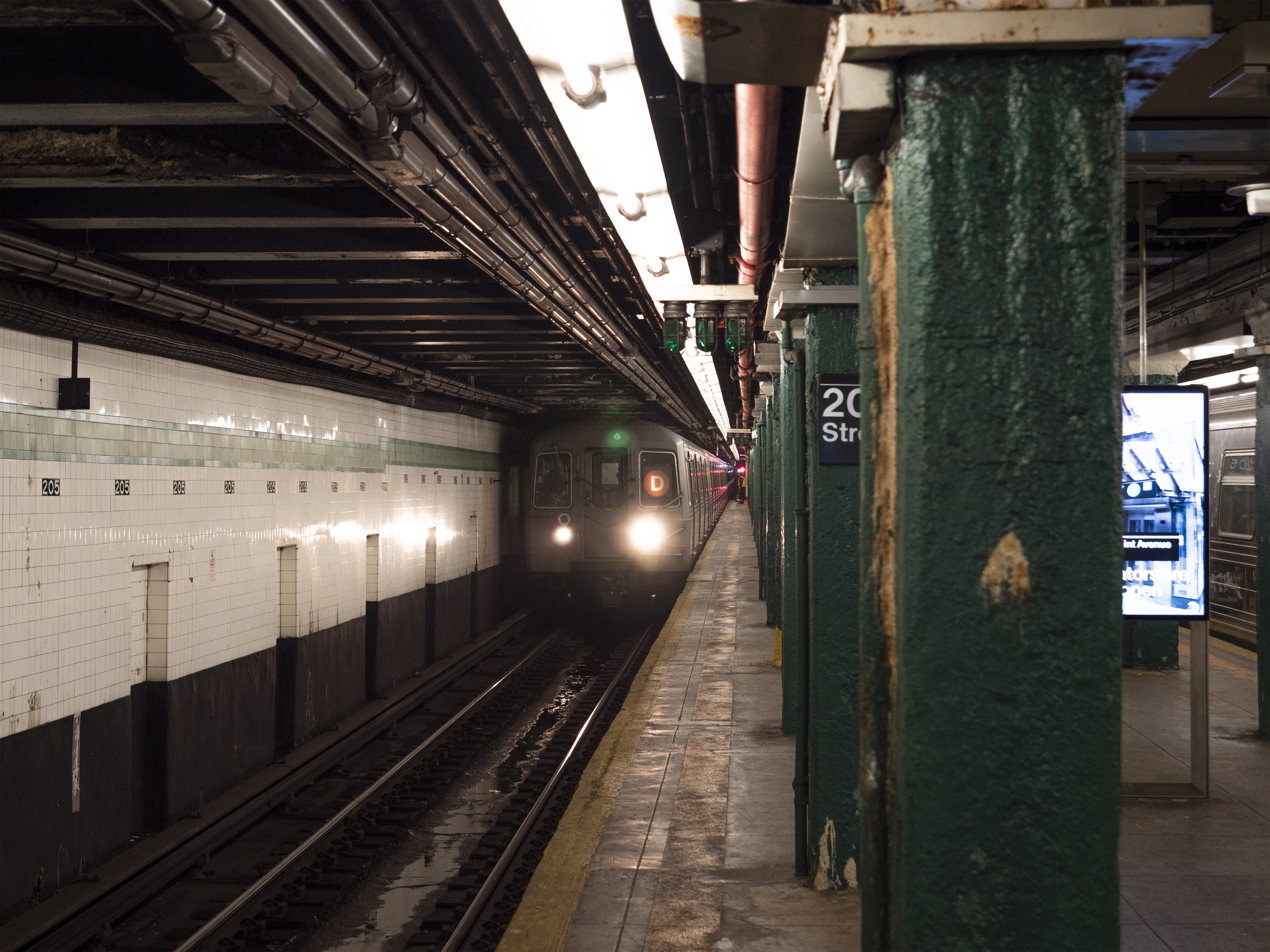
- An R68 D train arriving at the station

Station statistics
- Address: East 205th Street & Bainbridge Avenue; Bronx, New York
- Borough: The Bronx
- Locale: Norwood
- Coordinates: 40.874908°N 73.879452°W
- Division: B (IND)
- Line: IND Concourse Line
- Services: D (all times)
- Transit: NYCT Bus: Bx10, Bx16, Bx28, Bx34, Bx38
- Structure: Underground
- Platforms: 1 island platform
- Tracks: 2

Other information
- Opened: July 1, 1933; 93 years ago
- Accessible: No; planned
- Former/other names: 205th Street

Traffic
- 2025: 1,373,772 ▲6.9%
- Rank: 244 out of 423
Services
Preceding station	New York City Subway	Following station
Terminus	D (New York City Subway service)	Bedford Park Boulevard toward Coney Island–Stillwell Avenue
Location
Location within New York City Subway
Location within New York City
Location within New York
Track layout
Street map
Station service legend
Symbol	Description
Stops all times	Stops all times

The Norwood–205th Street station (signed as 205th Street station) is the northern terminal station on the IND Concourse Line of the New York City Subway. Located in Norwood, Bronx, it is served by the D train at all times. Due to changes in the street grid of the neighborhood, the station has exits to East 205th Street and Perry Avenue, as well as to East 206th Street and Bainbridge Avenue.

This station was constructed as part of the Independent Subway System, and opened in 1933, along with the rest of the Concourse Line. This station was not intended to be the terminus of the Concourse Line or the D train; the tracks were supposed to have been extended east past Bronx Park and the IRT White Plains Road Line along Burke Avenue to serve the northeast section of the Bronx. But, with the city's acquisition of the New York, Westchester and Boston Railway and subsequent conversion into the IRT Dyre Avenue Line, such an extension was deemed unnecessary. In the early 1950s, vacant land above the east end of the station was given to the New York Public Library and to the New York City Department of Parks and Recreation.

== History ==
The station was built as part of the sixth and seventh sections of the IND Concourse Line beginning in the late 1920s. The station was built underneath preexisting private property for most of its length, passing directly under East 205th Street at its eastern end. The station opened on July 1, 1933, along with the rest of the Concourse subway. On July 1, 1937, an escalator opened in the station, the first of its kind in the Bronx.

In the early 1950s, a portion of the vacant land above the east end of the station was relinquished by the New York City Board of Transportation in order to construct the New York Public Library's Mosholu Branch. The site, which had been purchased by the Board of Transportation in the 1930s for the construction of the station, had first been earmarked for a library in 1945. The library opened on August 6, 1954. That year, the remainder of the land, controlled by the New York City Transit Authority, was transferred to the New York City Department of Parks and Recreation in order to construct Whalen Playground.

On August 23, 1954, a D train relaying east of the station overshot the bumper blocks at the end of the track, crashing into the wall at the end of the line. The train motorman was trapped in the tunnel for seven hours, and when he was freed, his left foot had to be amputated.

As part of its 2025–2029 Capital Program, the MTA has proposed making the station wheelchair-accessible in compliance with the Americans with Disabilities Act of 1990.

== Station layout ==
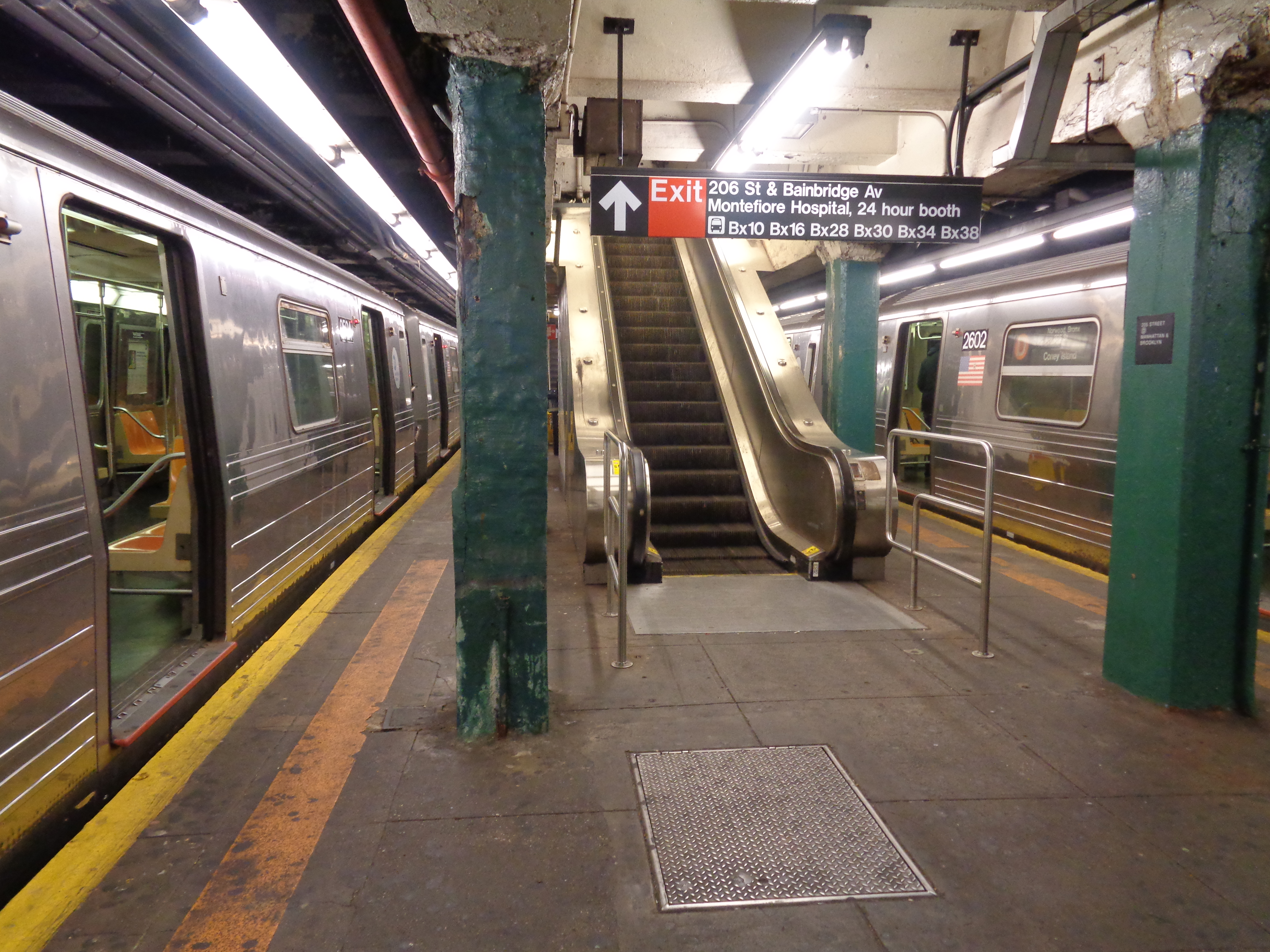
The escalator to the western fare control area at Bainbridge Avenue

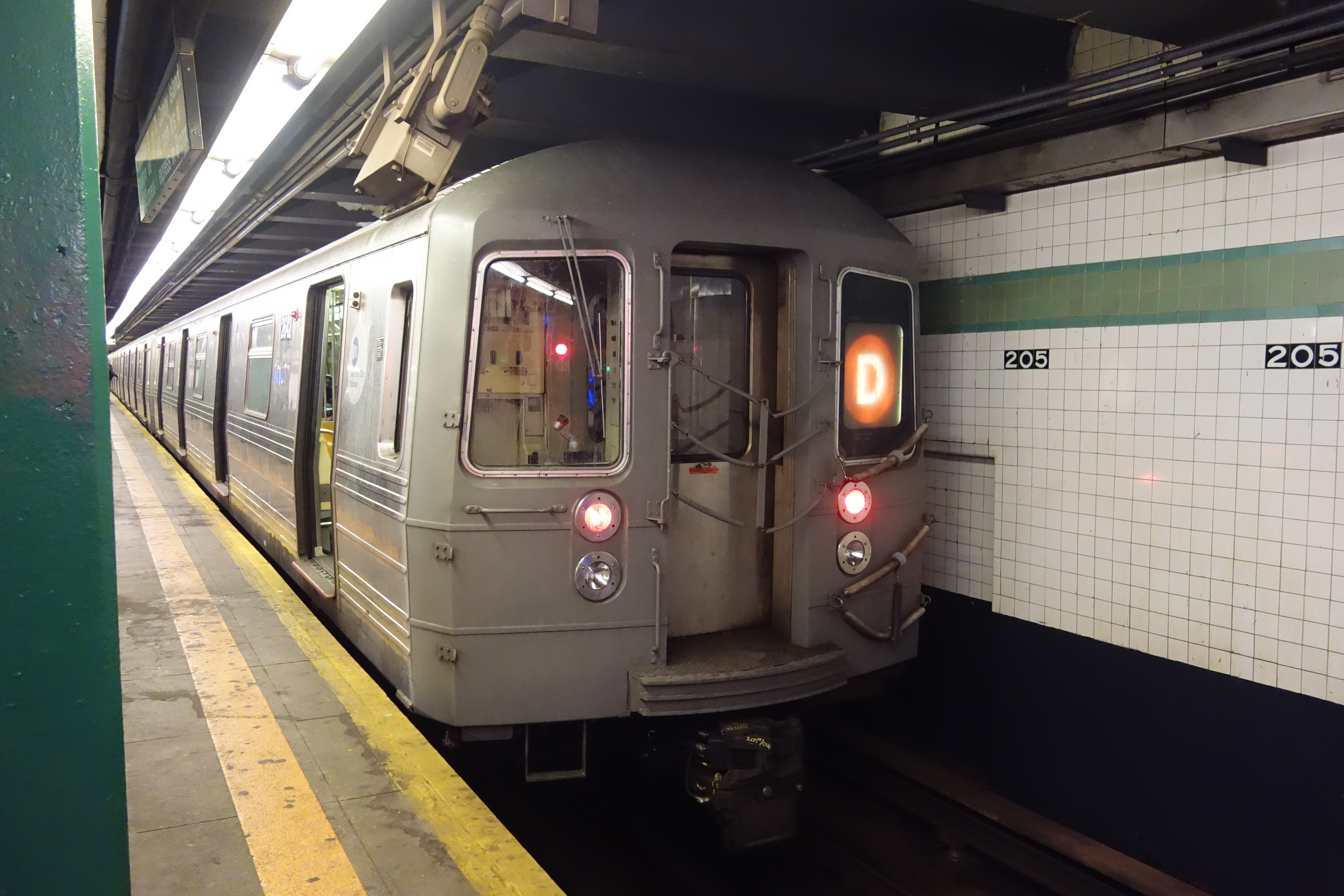
D train at the platform

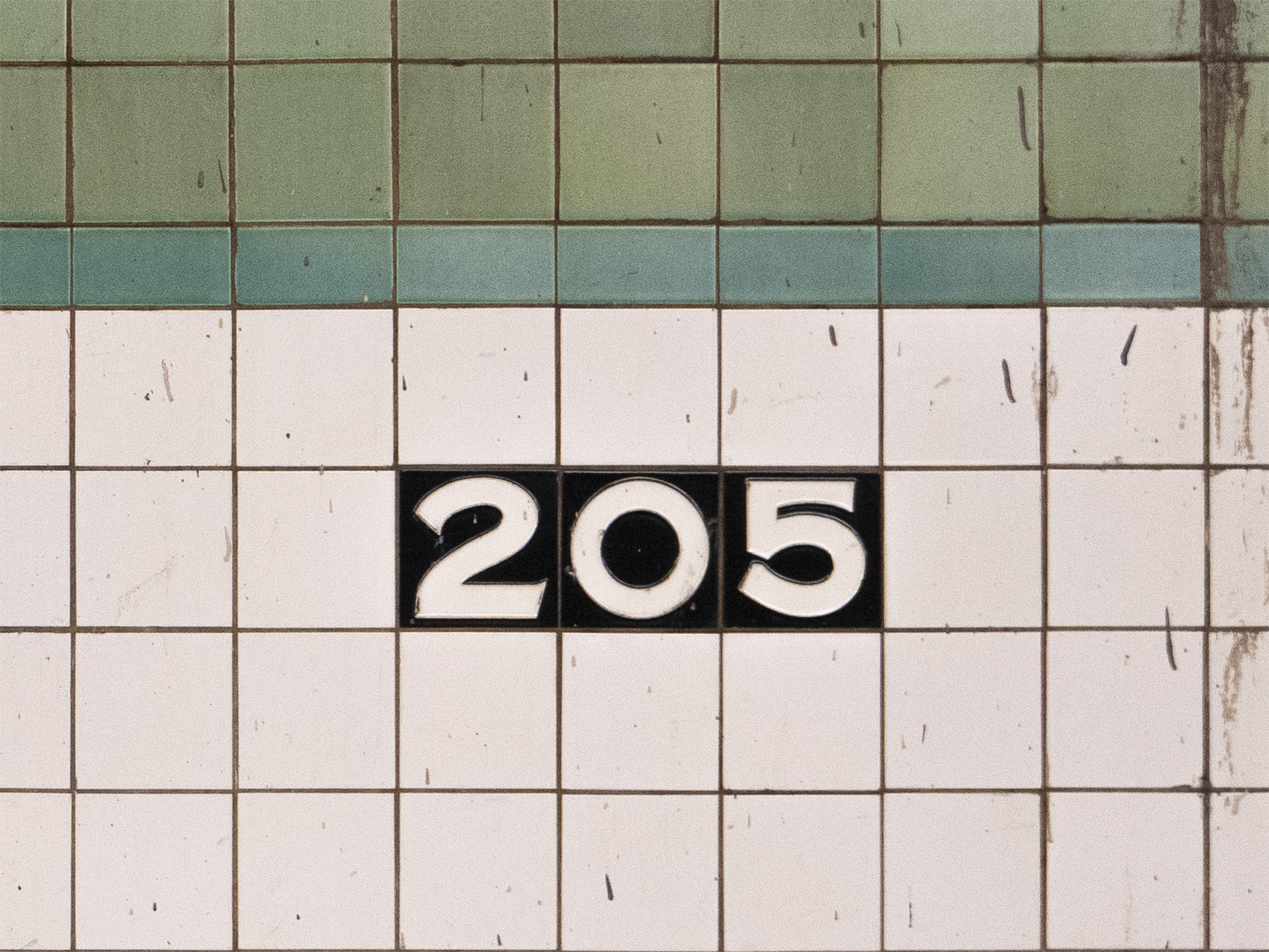
Tile caption below trim line

This underground station has two tracks and one island platform. The D train serves the station at all times. The station is the northern terminus for D trains; the next station to the south is Bedford Park Boulevard.

Both track walls have a lime green trim line with a medium Persian green border. Small tile captions reading "205" in white lettering on a black background are placed below the trim at regular intervals. The platform has a row of concrete-clad I-beam columns on both sides; these are painted medium Hunter green. There is clear evidence of water damage and mold due to poor drainage in numerous areas along the platform ceiling, the wall tiles, and to a number of the support columns. The station was also notorious for having piles of trash bags on the platform and at entrances, as well as for large amounts of litter on the tracks due to an absence of trash cans. 205th Street station was declared one of the five worst in the system in terms of maintenance and appearance by the New York City Transit Riders Council in 2005, problems which have persisted into the 2010s.

Due to changes in the street grid of the neighborhood, the station is located at East 205th Street and Perry Avenue at its eastern end, and at East 206th Street and Bainbridge Avenue at its western end. East 205th Street turns diagonally southwest at Perry Avenue, while the subway maintains its previous direction, lining up with Van Cortlandt Avenue before turning south onto Grand Concourse.

=== Exits ===
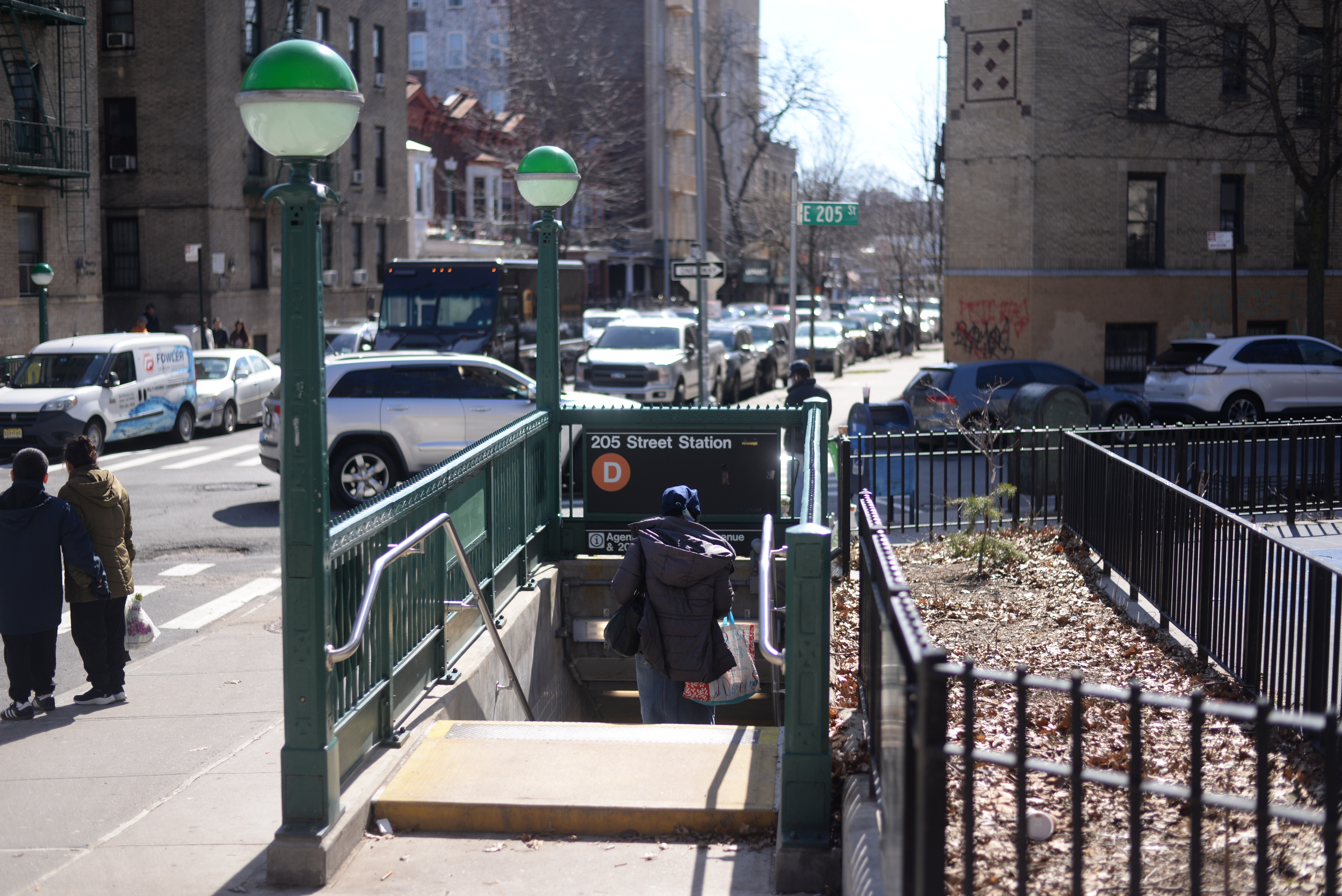
Exit at 205th St and Perry Avenue

This station has two fare control areas. The full-time side at the west (railroad south) end has a turnstile bank, token booth, and two staircases going up to the southeast and northwest corners of East 206th Street and Bainbridge Avenue. Because of the varying topography of the surrounding neighborhood, a single escalator was installed in 1937 in this fare control area, traversing an elevation difference of 25 feet (7.6 m) between the mezzanine and platform. Access to fare control otherwise requires walking up three flights of stairs from platform level.

The other fare control area, at the station's east (railroad north) end, accessed by a ramp to the platform, is unstaffed, containing full-height turnstiles and two staircases going up to the northwest and southeast corners of East 205th Street and Perry Avenue. The token booth at this location was closed on July 30, 2005 and removed sometime afterward.

== Track layout ==
This station was not intended to be the terminus of the Concourse Line or the D train; both tracks were supposed to have been extended east past Bronx Park and the IRT White Plains Road Line along Burke Avenue to serve the northeast section of the Bronx. This idea was postponed due to lack of funding, and ultimately mothballed when the City of New York bought the right-of-way of the bankrupt New York, Westchester and Boston Railway and converted it for subway use in 1941. Another proposal in the 1970s involved extending the Concourse Line to White Plains Road, but financial troubles caused the plan to be aborted.

As a result of the planned extension, the two tracks continue east of this station for about 700 feet along 205th Street to Webster Avenue, ending at a concrete wall. This station does not have any crew quarters; crews are changed at Bedford Park Boulevard, the next station south. Additionally, there is no diamond crossover between the tracks west of this station; here, a center track forms leading west to the Concourse Yard. Because of this, terminating trains arrive on the southern (railroad northbound) track and discharge their passengers before continuing east to the end of the track. They then use the diamond crossover there to return to this station on the northern (railroad southbound) track and begin service to Manhattan and Brooklyn. Due to the track configuration, trains may reverse into the yard from the southern track, and trains from the yard may start service on the northern track.

== Nearby points of interest ==
The station is located close to several Norwood landmarks, including the New York Public Library's Mosholu Branch; the Montefiore Medical Center and North Central Bronx Hospital, north of the station on East 210th Street; St. Brendan's Church and School; the Valentine–Varian House; and the Williamsbridge Oval, the former site of the Williamsbridge Reservoir.
