= Church of the Epiphany (Roman Catholic, Manhattan) =

Church in New York City

Coordinates: 40°44′14″N 73°58′55″W

The Church of the Epiphany
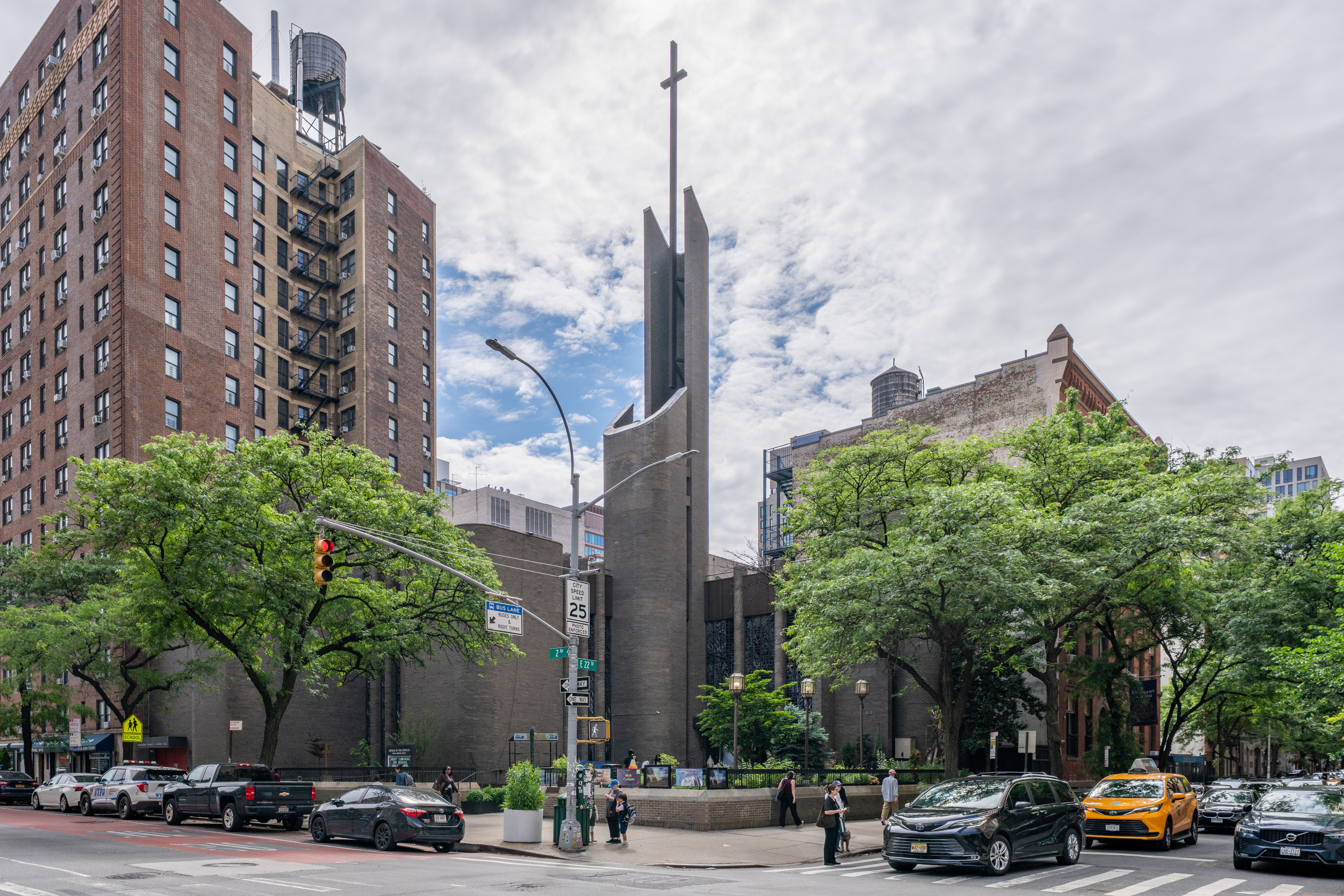
- (2026)
- Interactive map of the The Church of the Epiphany area

General information
- Architectural style: Modernist
- Location: 373 Second Avenue, Manhattan, New York City, United States
- Construction started: Church: 1965; Rectory: 1936
- Completed: Church: 1967; Rectory: 1937
- Cost: Church: $1,200,000 (1965); Rectory: $50,000 (1936)
- Client: Roman Catholic Archdiocese of New York

Design and construction
- Architects: Church: Belfatto & Pavarini; Rectory: Robert J. Reiley

Website
- Church of the Epiphany, Manhattan

The Church of the Epiphany is a parish church of the Roman Catholic Archdiocese of New York, located at 373 Second Avenue at the corner of East 22nd Street, in the Gramercy Park neighborhood of Manhattan in New York City. It operates a co-educational PreK–8 Catholic school and Religious Education program.

== History ==
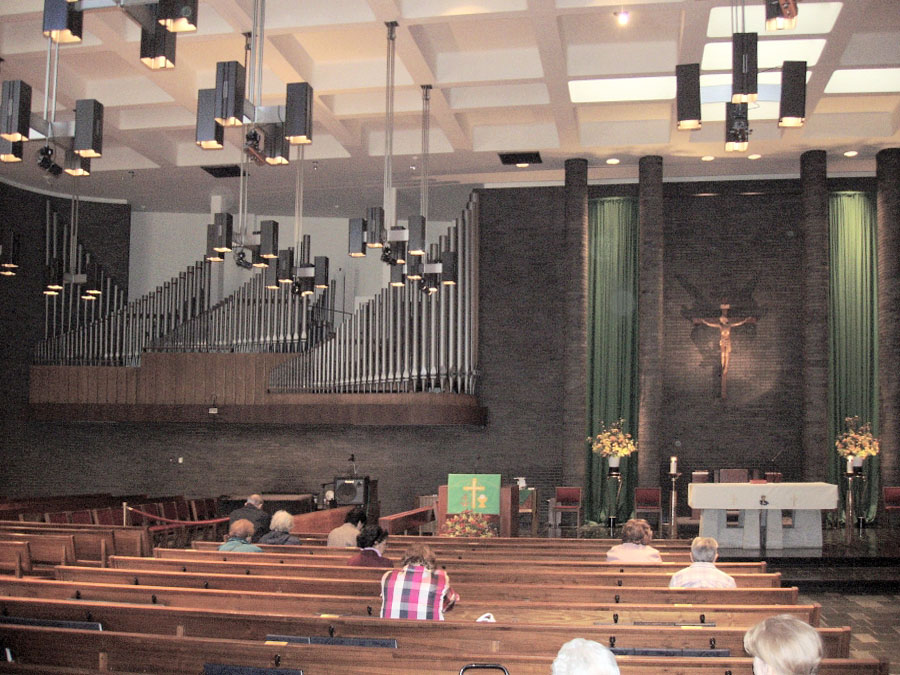
Church interior

The parish was established in 1868; 158 years ago. Its first Mass took place on January 5, 1868, the eve of the Epiphany Feast for which the parish was named. The first church building was designed by Napoleon LeBrun, constructed in 1869–1870, and dedicated on April 3, 1870. An errant cigarette burned down the building on December 20, 1963.

The current church was designed by Belfatto & Pavarini and built in 1965–1967 for $1,200,000 ($11,600,000 in current dollar terms), on the same site as the previous church. The seating is distributed closely around the main altar, supporting the liturgical reforms of Vatican II. The stained glass windows incorporate a Madonna and Child rescued from the fire. A new, three-manual pipe organ was built by the Delaware Organ Company. In 2000, the AIA Guide to New York City called this church: "the most positive modernist religious statement on Manhattan Island to date."

The parochial school was founded in 1888, and currently enrolls over 500 students. Now led by a lay principal and faculty, it was historically staffed by the Sisters of Charity of New York and the Congregation of Christian Brothers. The original building at 234 East 22nd Street has been joined by 141 East 28th Street (formerly St. Stephen's School) and 152 East 29th Street (Early Childhood Center).

The current four-story brick rectory was built at 239 East 21st Street in 1936–1937, designed by Robert J. Reiley.
