= Thomas John McDonnell =

American prelate

His Excellency, The Most Reverend Thomas John McDonnell
- Coadjutor Bishop of Wheeling
- Appointed: March 7, 1951
- Term ended: February 25, 1961
- Successor: Joseph Howard Hodges
- Previous post: Auxiliary Bishop of New York (1947–1951)

Orders
- Ordination: September 20, 1919
- Consecration: September 15, 1947 by Francis Spellman

Personal details
- Born: August 18, 1894 New York, New York, US
- Died: February 25, 1961 (aged 66) Huntington, West Virginia, US
- Buried: Mount Calvary Cemetery, Wheeling, West Virginia
- Denomination: Roman Catholic
- Motto: Ad Jesum Per Mariam (To Jesus through Mary)

Styles of Thomas John McDonnell
- Reference style: The Most Reverend
- Spoken style: Your Excellency

Thomas John McDonnell, D.D., (August 18, 1894 – February 25, 1961) was an American prelate of the Roman Catholic Church who served as the coadjutor bishop of the Diocese of Wheeling in West Virginia from 1951 until his death.

McDonnell previously served as an auxiliary bishop of the Archdiocese of New York from 1947 to 1951. He also served as national director of the Society for the Propagation of the Faith from 1936 to 1950.

== Biography ==
=== Early life ===
Thomas McDonnell was born on August 18, 1894, in New York City. He attended St. Francis Xavier High School and Cathedral College, both in Manhattan. Deciding to become a priest, he then entered St. Joseph's Seminary in Yonkers, New York.

=== Priesthood ===
McDonnell was ordained to the priesthood for the Archdiocese of New York on September 20, 1919. After his ordination, McDonnell was assigned as assistant rector at the new St. Clare Mission Church in Staten Island. On October 30, 1921, he sang the mass dedicating the church.

In 1923, Auxiliary Bishop John J. Dunn named McDonnell as his priest-secretary. At the same time, McDonnell became archdiocesan director for the Society for the Propagation of the Faith (the Society). Around this time, he received a Master of Arts degree from Fordham University in the Bronx.

The Vatican in 1936 appointed McDonnell as national director for the Society. While serving as director, he traveled to Australia, East Asia and Oceania. In 1937, the Vatican elevated McDonnell to the rank of domestic prelate. McDonnell was admitted as an affiliated member of the Marist Brothers in 1944.

=== Auxiliary Bishop of New York ===
On July 2, 1947, Pope Pius XII appointed McDonnell as an auxiliary bishop of New York and titular bishop of Sela. He was consecrated at St. Patrick's Cathedral in Manhattan on September 15, 1947. His principal consecrator was Cardinal Francis Spellman and the co-consecrators were Cardinals Richard Cushing and James McIntyre. McDonnell took as his episcopal motto: "Ad Jesum Per Mariam" (To Jesus through Mary).

On March 17, 1948, McDonnell celebrated a cathedral mass in honor of St. Patrick, with Spellman presiding. Over 3,000 parishioners were in attendance and the mass was covered in The New York Times. On June 6, 1948, McDonnell presided at a mass celebrating the golden jubilee of Monsignor John J. E. O'Brien, pastor of St. Agnes Parish in Manhattan. McDonnell resigned as national director of the Society in 1950.

=== Coadjutor Bishop of Wheeling ===
On March 7, 1951, Pius XII appointed McDonnell as coadjutor bishop of Wheeling, with the right to succeed Bishop John Joseph Swint.

On October 24, 1953, McDonnell consecrated the altar in Our Lady Seat of Wisdom Chapel at Marist College with the relics of two martyrs, Pope Urban I and St. Felician, On May 16, 1954, All Saints Catholic Church in Bridgeport, West Virginia, was dedicated by him. McDonnell dedicated Sacred Heart Catholic Church in Williamson, West Virginia on May 27, 1951, and its school on December 15, 1957.

=== Death and legacy ===
McDonnell died suddenly at St. Mary's Hospital in Huntington, West Virginia, of an acute viral infection on February 25, 1961.
