= Belfatto & Pavarini =

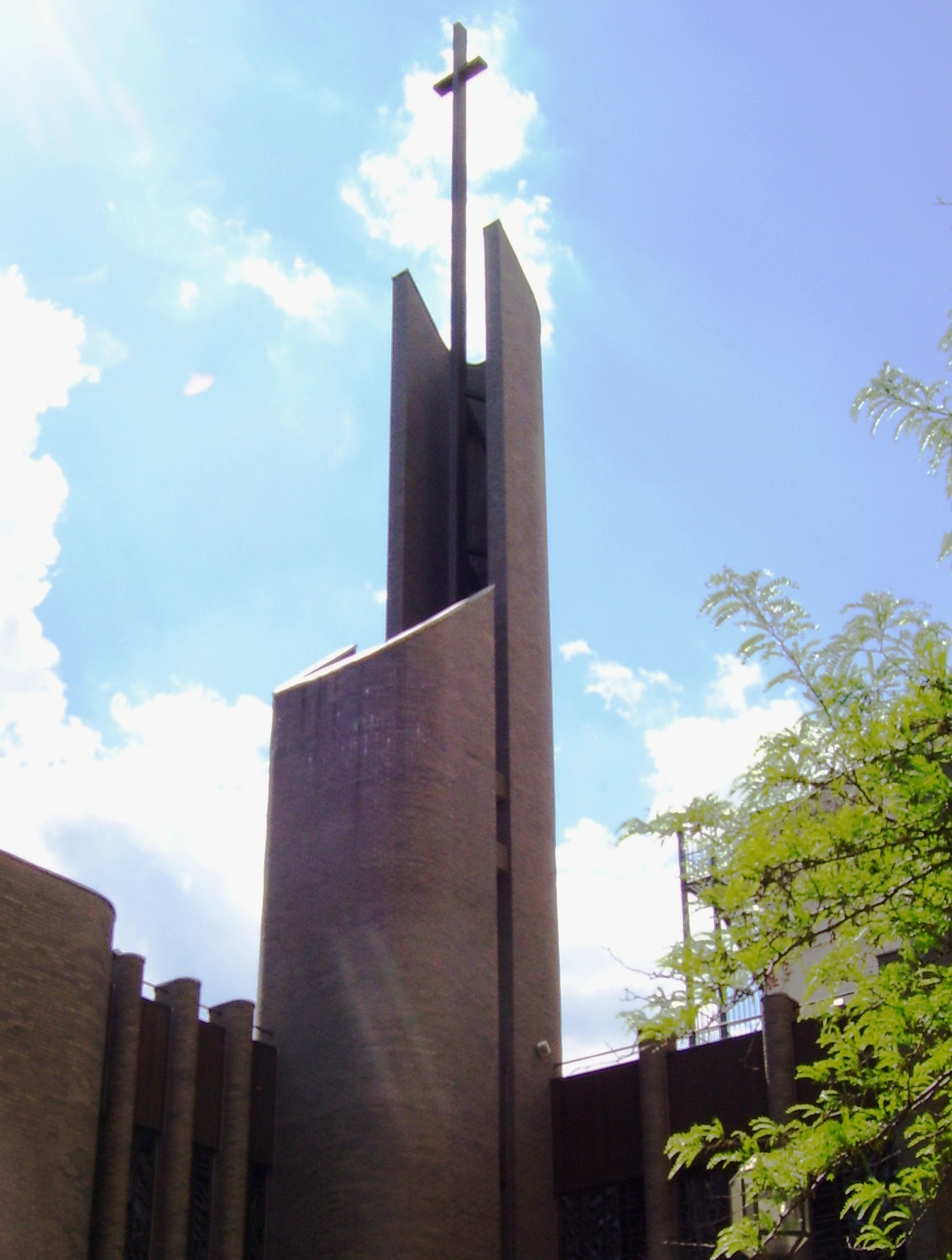
- Epiphany Church (New York City), built 1965, photographed 2010

Practice information
- Key architects: Joseph H. Belfatto
- Location: New York City

Belfatto & Pavarini was an American architecture firm based in New York City, practicing in the mid-20th century. Led by Joseph H. Belfatto (1925–2014), the firm was notable for its Modernist style of design, principally of St. Brendan's Church (Bronx, New York) (1966) and Epiphany Church (New York City) (1965).
