= Williamsbridge Oval =

Public park in the Bronx, New York

Williamsbridge Oval Park
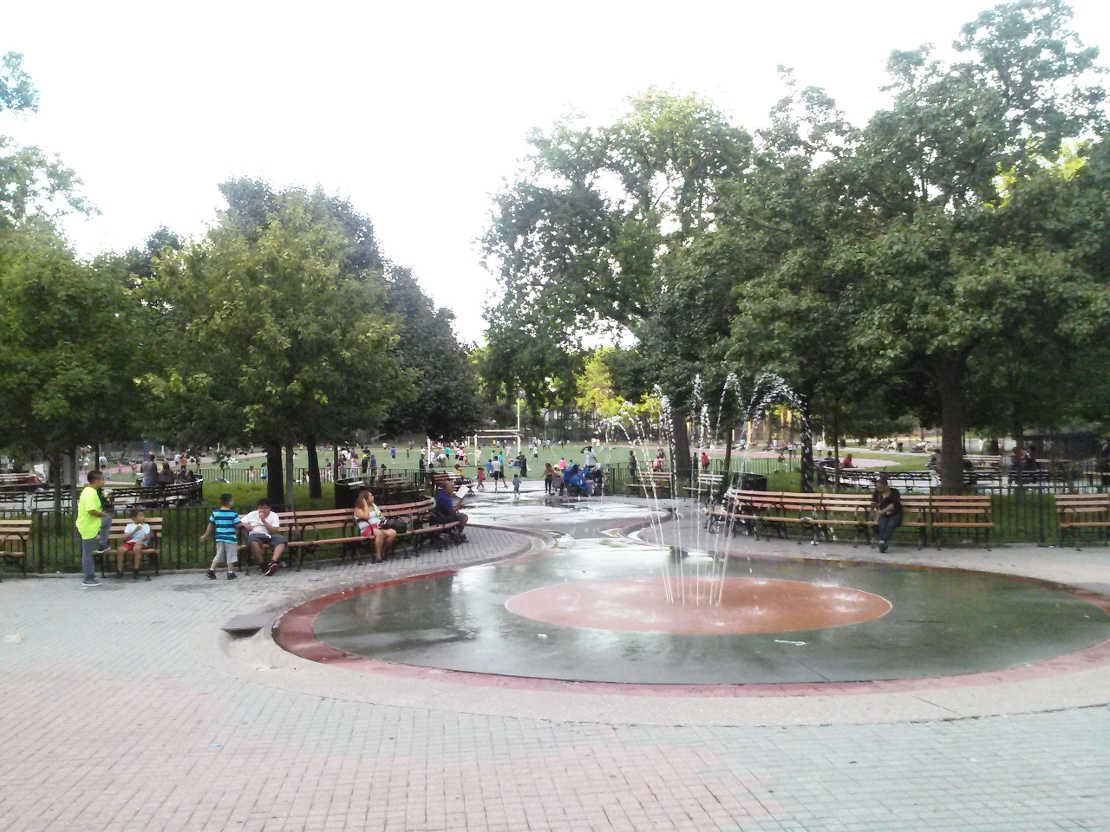
- A typical July evening in Williamsbridge Oval
- Interactive map of Williamsbridge Oval Park
- Type: Neighborhood Park
- Location: The Bronx, New York City, NY, US
- Coordinates: 40°52′39″N 73°52′39″W
- Area: 19.75 acres (7.99 ha)
- Created: 1934
- Operator: New York City Department of Parks and Recreation
- Williamsbridge Oval Park
- U.S. National Register of Historic Places
- Location within New York City Location within the United States
- Location: Reservoir Oval E. & W., Norwood, Bronx, New York
- Coordinates: 40°52′39″N 73°52′39″W
- Area: 18.87 acres (7.64 ha)
- Built: 1937
- Architect: Aymar Embury II; Nelson M. Wells; Gilmore David Clarke
- Architectural style: Beaux Arts, Art Moderne
- NRHP reference No.: 15000229
- Added to NRHP: May 14, 2015

The Williamsbridge Oval is a park located in Norwood, Bronx, New York City. It is listed in the National Register of Historic Places.

== History ==
The Williamsbridge Oval Park was built on the site of the Williamsbridge Reservoir after the reservoir was drained and the land transferred to the Parks Department in 1934. The park was funded, designed, and built by the Works Progress Administration under the supervision of the New York City Parks Department and was officially opened on September 11, 1937.

== Attractions ==
Williamsbridge Oval has multiple playgrounds, tennis courts, basketball courts, plus an athletic field, a 400m 4-lane running track, a dog run, playground spray showers, ornamental flower beds and walking paths shaded by trees.

The original 1930s recreation center was reopened in 2013 after extensive renovations.

The park hosts community and NYC Parks sponsored events all year round.

== In popular culture ==
- In Penny Marshall's film Awakenings (1990), Robin Williams' and Robert De Niro's characters are filmed taking a walk through the Williamsbridge Oval park.

== Image gallery ==
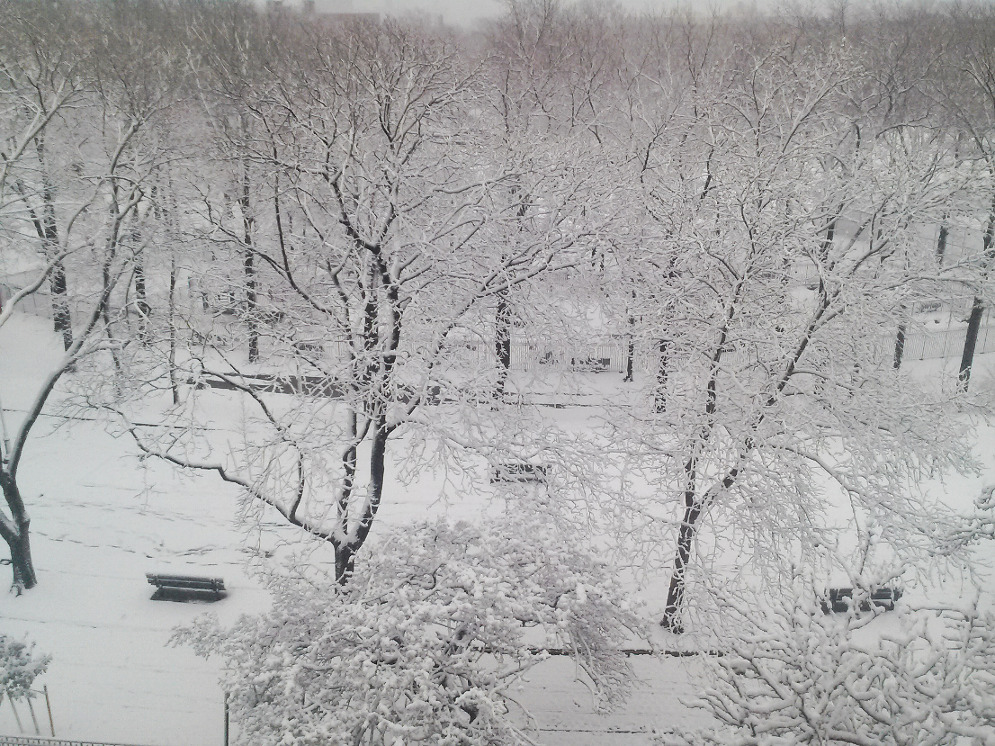
A winter snowfall in Williamsbridge Oval Park

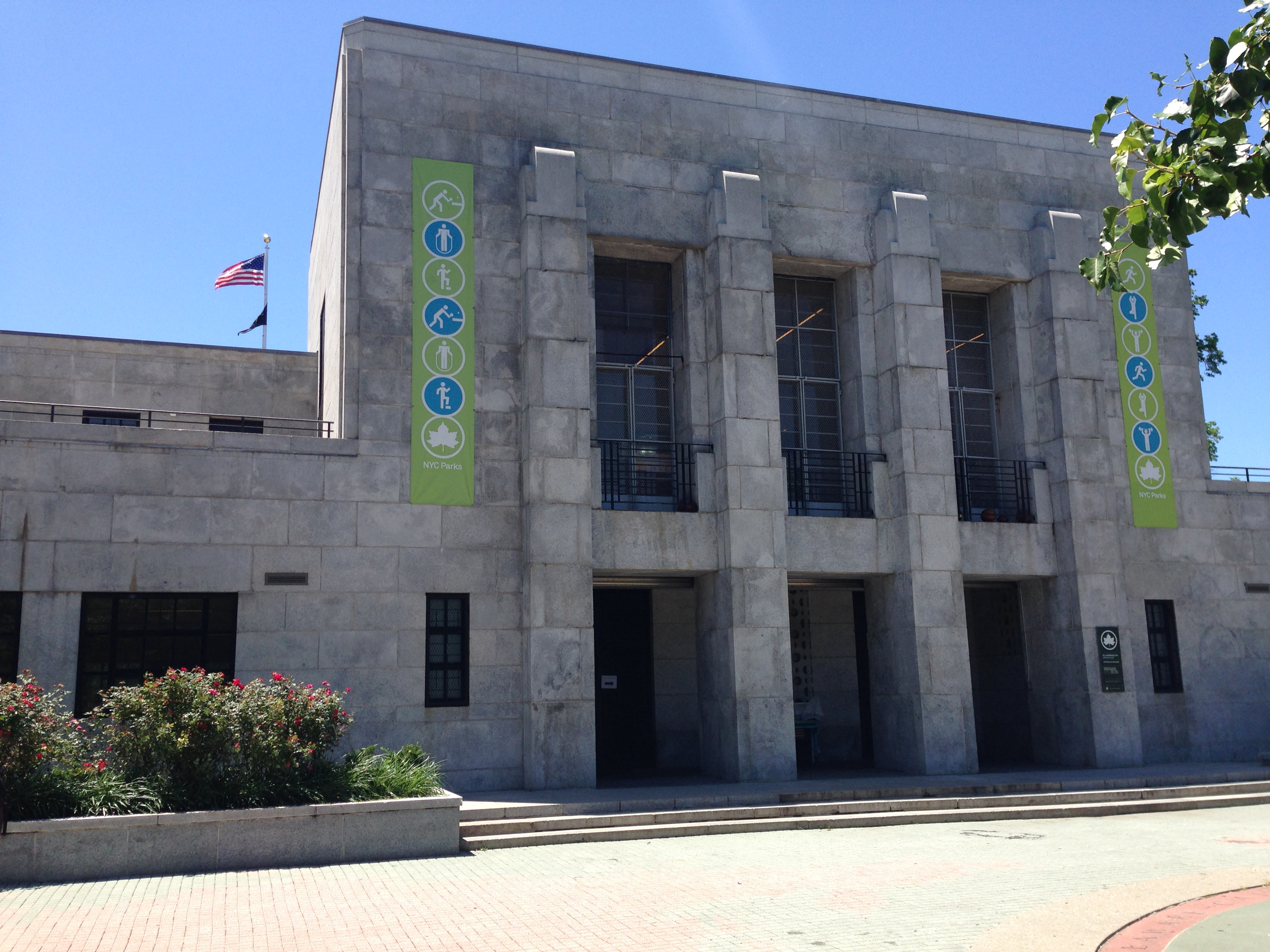
Williamsbridge Oval Park Recreation Center
