= Williamsbridge Reservoir =

Former lake in the Bronx, New York

- 1911-1913 map

- Location within New York City Location within New York
- Location: Williamsbridge Oval, Bronx, New York
- Coordinates: 40°52′39″N 73°52′38″W
- Type: former lake
- Surface area: 13.1 acres (5.3 ha)

Williamsbridge Reservoir was a natural lake (despite its name) measuring 13.1 acres (5.3 ha) just south of Van Cortlandt Park in the Bronx, New York. Specifically the body of water was located at 208th Street and Bainbridge Avenue. It was shaped like a saucer and was normally 41 feet (12 m) deep. Its water level dropped approximately 14 feet (4.3 m) in mid-August 1901. On April 3, 1934 Commissioner of Water Supply, Gas and Electricity, Maurice P. Davidson, proposed that it be offered to Robert Moses to be used as a park site. The reservoir had ceased to be used after 1919.

== History of reservoir site ==
1901 map

A site for the Montefiore Home, first organized in 1884, was acquired in the West Bronx, between Columbia Oval and the Williamsbridge Reservoir, in January 1910. On the plot a hospital for treating various diseases replaced the previous site of the Montefiore Home, a building at Broadway (Manhattan) between 137th Street and 138th Street.

In June 1928 a four-year-old boy, Frederic Fleishaus, of 3315 Rochambeau Avenue, the Bronx, drowned in Williamsbridge Reservoir. He gained access to the water through a small opening in an eight-foot fence which had been erected for protection.

The Williamsbridge Reservoir property came under the control of the New York State Office of Parks, Recreation and Historic Preservation on June 27, 1934. A new sport and play area covering 20 acres (8.1 ha), known as the Williamsbridge Oval Park and Williamsbridge Playground and Recreation Center, opened there on September 11, 1937. A Works Progress Administration project, the facilities cost $1,500,000 to build. It features a Beaux Arts landscape and Art Moderne recreation center.

The Keeper's House at Williamsbridge Reservoir was listed on the National Register of Historic Places in 1999. Sixteen years later, the entire park was listed on the Register as well.
