= Parish of St. Brendan and of St. Ann =

Parish of St. Ann-St. Brendan
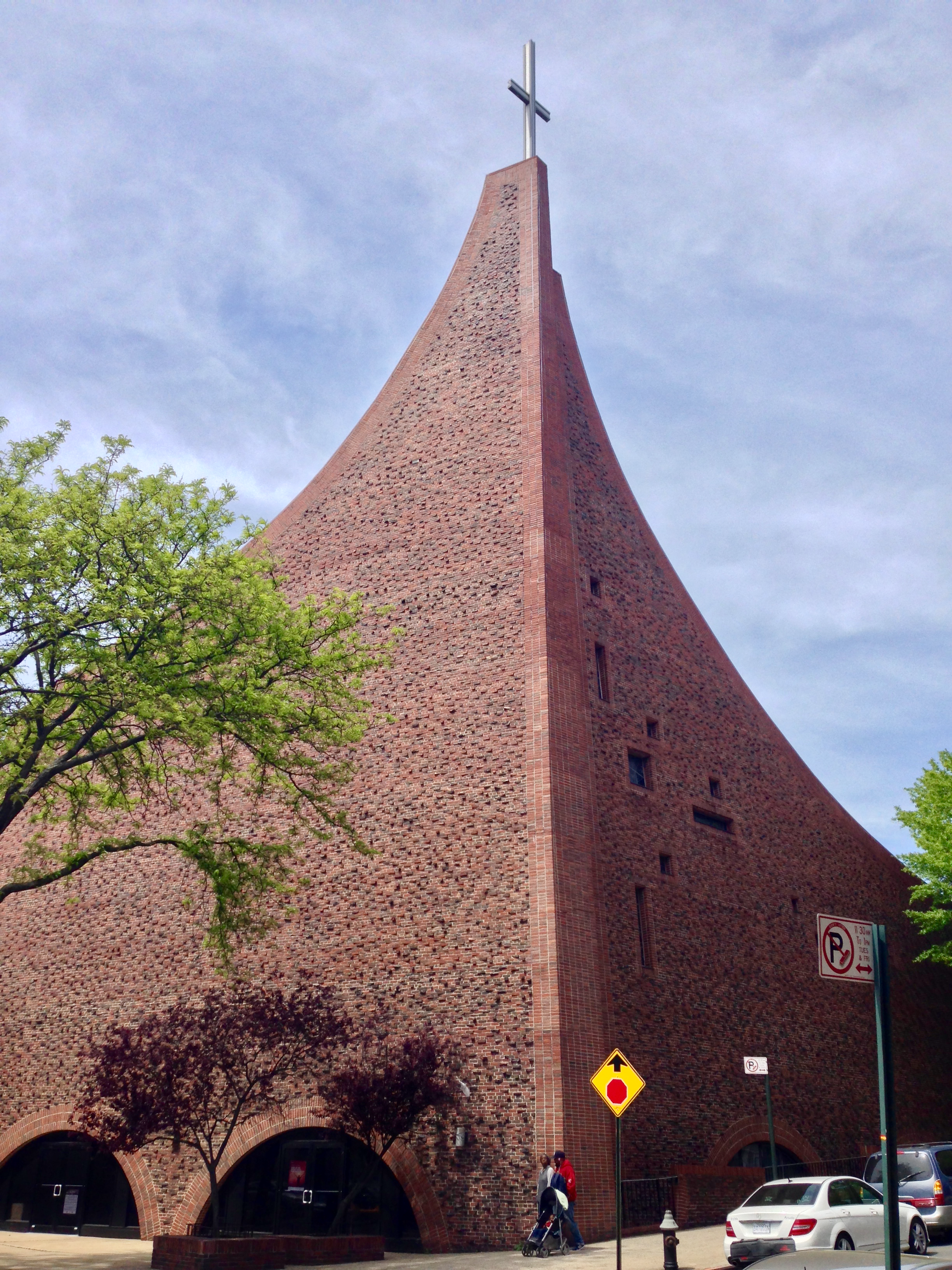
- Location: 333 East 206 Street, Bronx, New York 10467
- Country: United States
- Denomination: Roman Catholic

History
- Founded: August 1, 2015
- Dedication: St. Ann and St. Brendan

Architecture
- Architect: Belfatto & Pavarini
- Architectural type: Church
- Style: Modernist
- Groundbreaking: 1965
- Completed: 1966

Administration
- Archdiocese: New York

Clergy
- Pastor: Rev. Raul Miguez

The Parish of St. Ann-St. Brendan is a parish of the Archdiocese of New York located in the Bronx, New York. It was created on August 1, 2015, by the merger of two previous parishes, the Shrine Church of St. Ann and the Parish of St. Brendan.

== History ==
As part of a sweeping merger of parishes of the archdiocese by Cardinal Timothy Dolan, the Archbishop of New York, the decision was made to merge these two parishes. The former St. Brendan's Church was designated to serve as the parish church of the new parish. The inaugural Mass of the new parish took place on August 1, 2015.

== St. Brendan's ==
The Church of St. Brendan
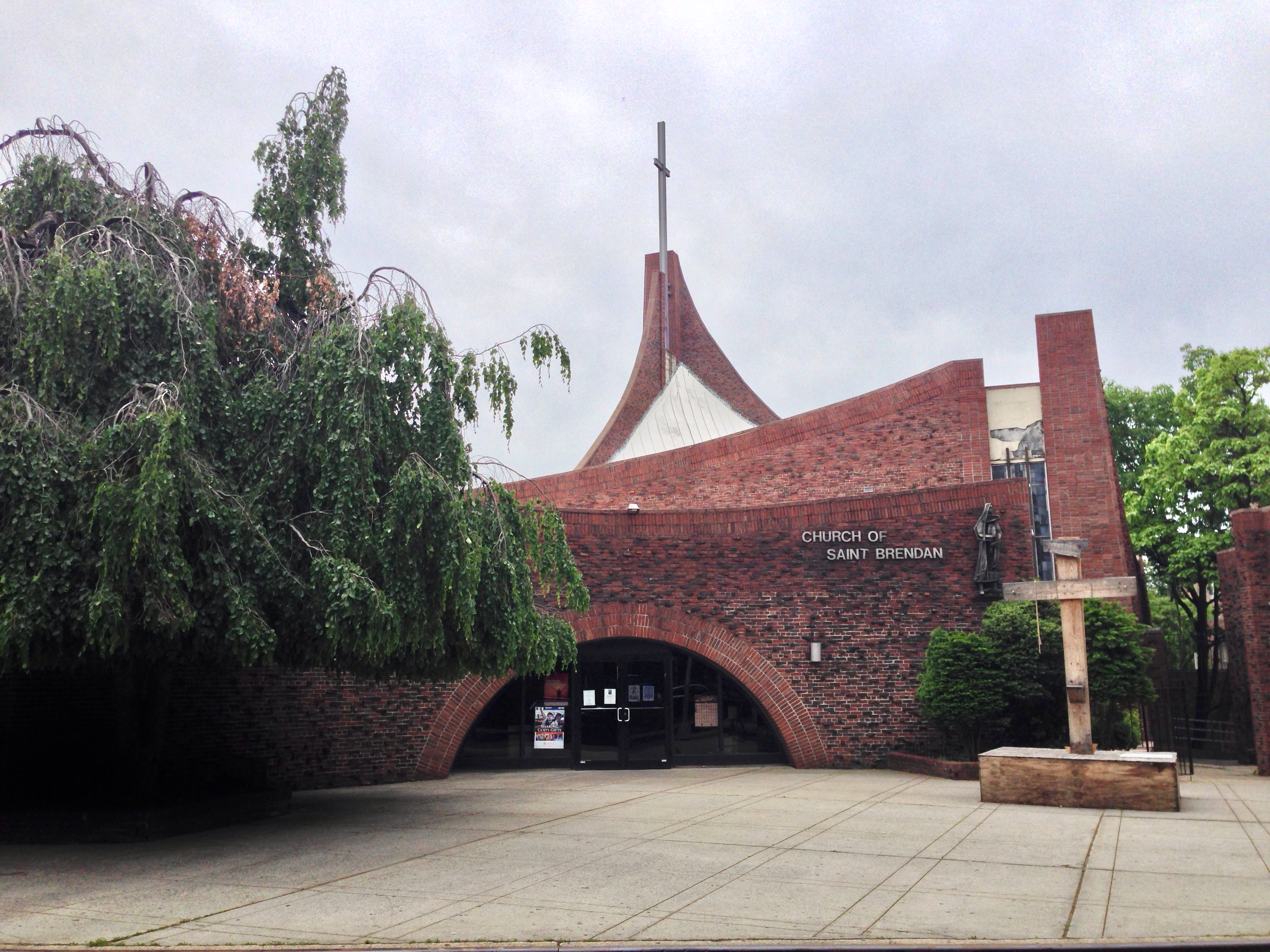
- Church of Saint Brendan in Norwood, Bronx.

General information
- Location: Bedford Park / Norwood, The Bronx, New York City

Technical details
- Structural system: Steel frame with brick cladding

The Church of St. Brendan is a parish church under the authority of the Roman Catholic Archdiocese of New York, located at East 207th Street and Perry Avenue in the Norwood neighborhood of The Bronx, New York City. The parish was merged with that of the Church of St. Ann on August 1, 2015.

=== Parish history ===
Originally, Catholics in the Norwood section of the Bronx worshipped at St. Mary's Church in Williamsbridge. St. Brendan's parish was established in 1908. Fr. Denis O’Donovan was appointed Rector. Initially, a small frame building on Webster Avenue and 205th Street was converted into use as a chapel. A larger stone Gothic church was completed and dedicated on November 21, 1909.

Its affiliated K-8 school was founded in 1912 by the Dominican Sisters and classes were first held in the basement of the parish church. In 1923, the school moved into a large fireproof building.

=== Buildings ===
The church building was built 1966 to Modernist designs by the architectural firm of Belfatto & Pavarini to resemble the prow of a ship. The nautical design references the titular saint, Saint Brendan the Navigator. The rectory address is 333 East 206th St., Bronx NY 10467.

== Shrine Church of St. Ann ==
Shrine Church of St. Ann
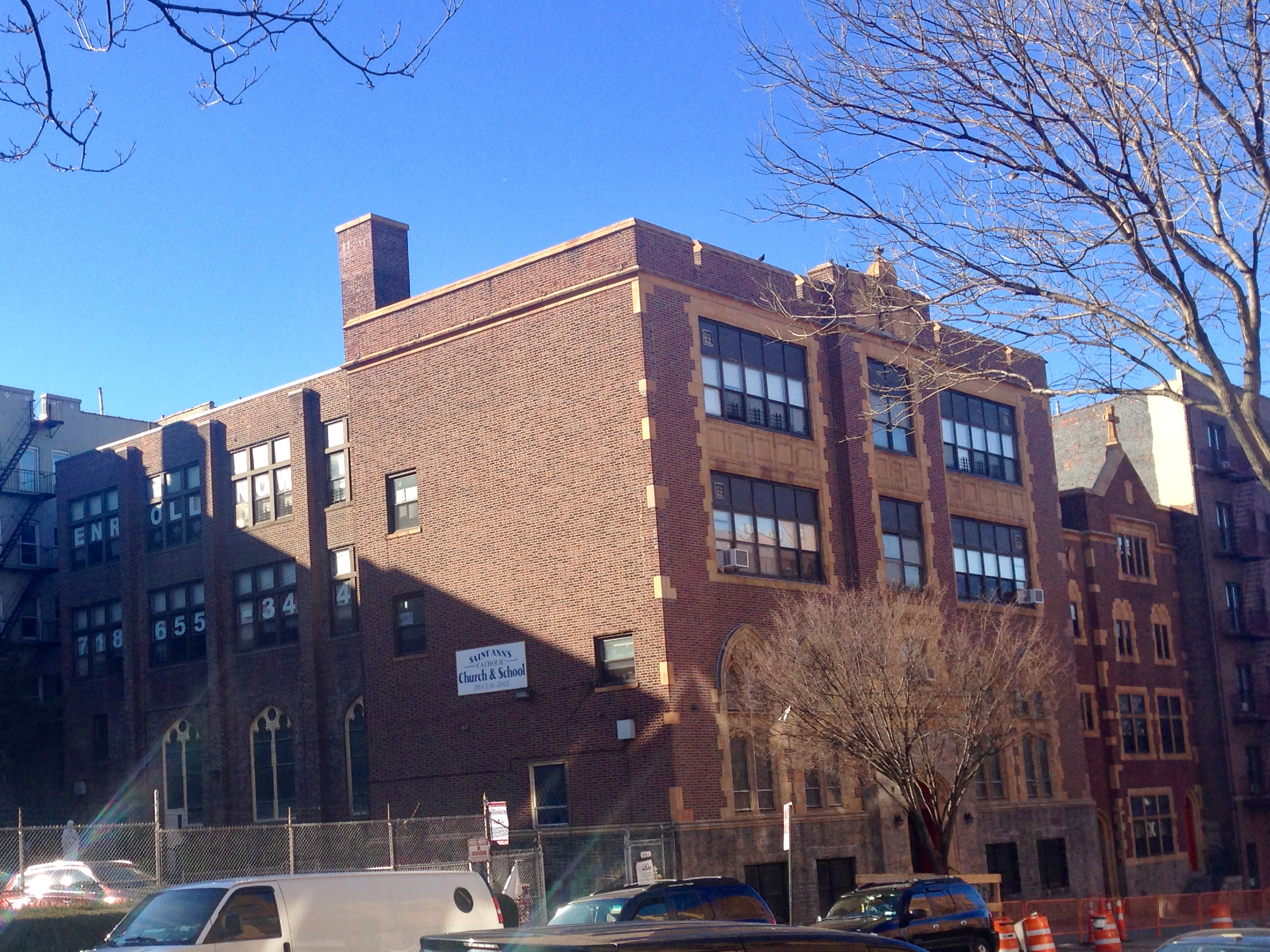
- Location: 3519 Bainbridge Avenue, Bronx, New York 10467
- Country: United States
- Denomination: Roman Catholic

History
- Founded: December 25, 1927
- Founder: Rev. Martin Cavanaugh
- Dedication: Saint Ann

Architecture
- Functional status: closed
- Architect: Viemuster & Brady
- Architectural type: Church and school
- Style: Collegiate Gothic with Decorated Gothic and Tudor Gothic
- Groundbreaking: 1928
- Completed: 1929
- Construction cost: $300,000
- Closed: August 1, 2015

Administration
- Archdiocese: New York

Clergy
- Pastor: Rev. Francis P. Scanlon

The Shrine Church of St. Ann was a parish church under the authority of the Roman Catholic Archdiocese of New York, located at Bainbridge Avenue, just north of Gun Hill Road, in the Norwood area of the Bronx, New York. The parish was founded in 1927, and closed as of August 1, 2015. The parish was merged with the former Parish of St. Brendan, with the Church of St. Brendan being designated as the parish church of the new combined parish, which was named the Parish of St. Brendan-St. Ann.

=== History ===
The parish was founded in 1927 by Cardinal Patrick J. Hayes, the Archbishop of New York, to serve the growing population of the North Bronx, due to the recent completion of various subway lines which were being extended to that northernmost region of the City of New York. The first Mass was celebrated on Christmas Day of that year in the cafeteria of Montefiore Home and Hospital, located across the street from the planned site of the church.

The new parish had from the outset the unique distinction of being designated as not a territorial parish church but as a shrine dedicated to its patron saint, Saint Ann, the mother of the Blessed Virgin Mary, and the grandmother of her son, Jesus. From the time of its founding in 1927, an annual novena of Masses in honor of this saint was observed during the nine days leading up to her feast day.

The original property purchased for the parish extended from East Gun Hill Road one block north. The decision was made by the Rev. Martin Cavanaugh, the founding pastor, to make the school the first building to be constructed for the parish complex, with the worship area to be in the school gymnasium until a church could be constructed. This was not to be, however, as the Great Depression started just as the school was being completed. As a consequence, the pastor had to make the lower part of the school the permanent site of the parish church.

Additionally, an adjacent lot had to be sold to cover the debts from the construction of the school and an adjoining convent. The convent had to be taken over by the clergy to serve as the parish rectory, and plans for any further building were scrapped.

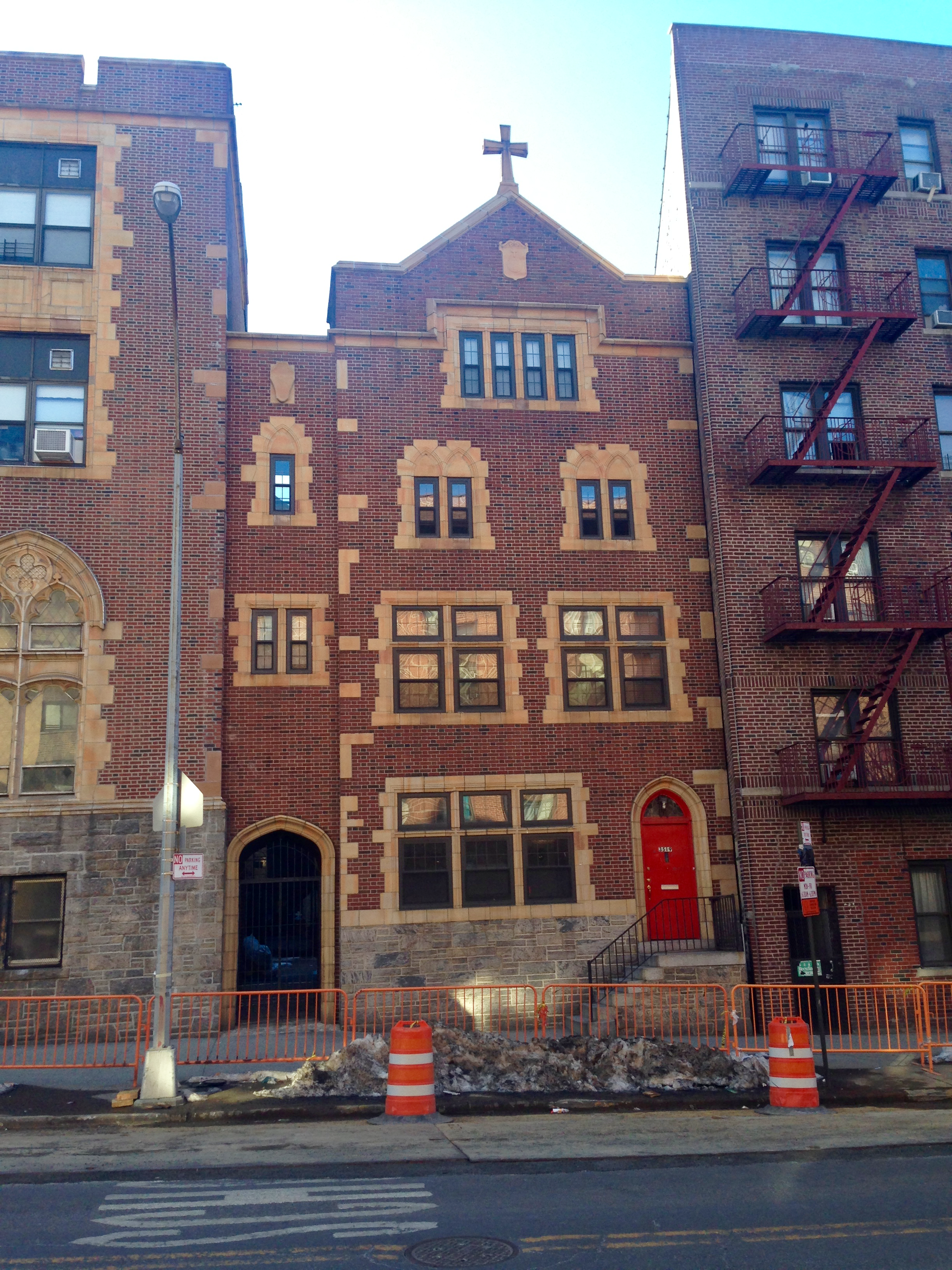
The former parish rectory (2017)

=== Buildings ===
The church and parish school were located in the same building, a common school-above-church design feature of several New York City parishes. It is a red brick multistory Collegiate Gothic structure with Decorated Gothic and Tudor Gothic design elements with terracotta trim over a raised field-stone basement and entrance breakfront. The church was located at the building's piano nobile, above the raised basement and accessed by both a perron through an ornate Tudor-arched entrance and a second flight within the building. The school was located on the two floors above the church.

In the 1960s, a new convent was built just to the north of the original property in order to house the community of Dominican Sisters of Sparkill teaching in the school, who had been required to live in the convent of the neighboring St. Brendan Parish, where they also taught. These Sisters withdrew from serving in the parish in the 1980s. Later the building became occupied by the Franciscan Friars of the Renewal, who initially used it as their novitiate. It is currently occupied by their coworkers, the Franciscan Sisters of the Renewal, who run a food pantry for the parish.

=== School ===
Founded at the establishment of the parish, the school consisted of eight grades, operated by the parish. It was staffed for many years by the Dominican Sisters, with the staff transforming to all lay people during the 1970s.

In 2013, operation of the school was removed from the authority of the pastor and it was joined to all other parochial schools in the borough under the authority of a regional archdiocesan authority. For the following school term, the school had an enrollment of about 150 students, down by half of its previous enrollment.

=== Closing ===
In 2013, the Archdiocese of New York began a year-long process of evaluation of all its parishes, called Making All Things New. It released the results of this study in November of the following year. Among the many similar decisions reached by the study was that the Parish of St. Ann should be merged with the neighboring Parish of St. Brendan. In November 2014, an official decree was issued by Cardinal Timothy M. Dolan, then the Archbishop of New York, making these changes effective as of August 1 of the following year. It was decreed that the church was to no longer be used for religious functions.

The school was allowed to continue operating after the closing of the parish church. It was closed, however, by the archdiocese at the end of the school term in June 2017. The reason given was the difficulty of maintaining the facilities, given that half of the building was unoccupied.

Immediately after the school was closed, Dolan decreed that, at the request of the pastor of the new parish, the church was to be deconsecrated from its religious use, and thereby was available for sale for other purposes.
