= History of the BRT and BMT =

History of New York City rapid transit (1899–1940)

Brooklyn Union Elevated Railroad New York Consolidated Railroad New York Rapid Transit Corporation
Overview
- Headquarters: Brooklyn, NY
- Locale: New York City
- Dates of operation: 1899 – 1907 (B'klyn Heights RR); 1907 – 1912 (B'klyn Union El. RR); 1912 – 1923 (NY Consol. RR); 1923–1940 (NYRT Corp.)

Technical
- Track gauge: 4 ft 8 1/2 in (1,435 mm) standard gauge

Starting in 1899, the Brooklyn Rapid Transit Company (BRT; 1896–1923) and Brooklyn–Manhattan Transit Corporation (BMT; 1923–1940) operated rapid transit lines in New York City — at first only elevated railways and later also subways.

Until 1907, these lines were leased to the Brooklyn Heights Railroad, which also operated the BRT's surface transit lines. In 1907, the lease of the Brooklyn Union Elevated Railroad was canceled, and this company began to operate most of the rapid transit lines. A new company, the New York Consolidated Railroad, was formed in 1912 as the rapid transit operating subsidiary, and that same year the New York Municipal Railway was formed to enter into Contract 4 of the Dual Contracts with the city, under which the BRT gained subways and elevated extensions.

In 1923, as part of the reorganization of the BRT into the BMT, the two companies were merged to form the New York Rapid Transit Corporation; the Brooklyn and Queens Transit Corporation was similarly formed in 1929 as the surface transit subsidiary. When the New York City Board of Transportation took over the BMT in 1940, the company ceased to operate.

== BRT (1899–1923) ==
The Brooklyn Union Elevated Railroad was incorporated on January 30, 1899, and acquired the property of the bankrupt Brooklyn Elevated Railroad on February 17. The BRT gained control a month later, on March 25, and leased the elevated company to the Brooklyn Heights Railroad, until then solely a street railway company, on April 1. The other elevated company in Brooklyn, the Kings County Elevated Railway, was sold under foreclosure to the BRT on July 6, 1899, and reorganized on August 1 as the Kings County Elevated Railroad.

The first step in simplifying the corporate structure was made in 1900, when the Sea View Railroad (Brighton Beach Line) was merged into the Kings County Elevated (on May 9) and the Kings County Elevated was then merged into the Brooklyn Union Elevated (on May 24). The lease to the Brooklyn Heights was canceled effective March 1, 1907, after which the Brooklyn Union Elevated operated itself. At the same time, the lease of the ground-level Canarsie Railroad, which was run as part of the elevated system, was transferred to the Brooklyn Union Elevated. The Sea Beach Railway (Sea Beach Line) and South Brooklyn Railway (Culver Line), which had been operated by the Brooklyn Heights as part of its elevated system, were released for independent operation.

Thus, as of March 1907, the following lines were operated with elevated trains:

Brooklyn Union Elevated Railroad

- Brighton Beach Line, Park Row, Lower Manhattan to Coney Island
  - via Long Island Rail Road Manhattan Beach Division to Manhattan Beach
- Broadway Line, Broadway Ferry, Williamsburg to Cypress Hills
  - via incline and Long Island Rail Road Atlantic Avenue Division to Jamaica, Queens; also via Rockaway Beach Division to Rockaway Park, Queens
- Canarsie Line, Broadway Ferry, Williamsburg to Canarsie Landing
- Fifth Avenue Line, Park Row, Lower Manhattan to Bay Ridge
- Fulton Street Line, Park Row, Lower Manhattan to City Line
- Lexington Avenue Line, Park Row, Lower Manhattan to Cypress Hills
- Myrtle Avenue Line, Park Row, Lower Manhattan to Ridgewood, Queens

Nassau Electric Railroad

- West End Line, Park Row, Lower Manhattan to Coney Island (operated by the Brooklyn Union Elevated north of 36th Street); the Nassau Electric also operated 86th Street Line trolleys on the West End Line south of Bath Beach

Sea Beach Railway

- Sea Beach Line, Park Row, Lower Manhattan to Coney Island (operated by the Brooklyn Union Elevated north of 36th Street, and by the Sea Beach over Nassau Electric trackage rights on the West End Line between 36th Street and Bath Junction); the Sea Beach also operated trolleys west of Bath Junction

South Brooklyn Railway

- Culver Line, Park Row, Lower Manhattan to Coney Island (operated by the Brooklyn Union Elevated north of 36th Street); many trolleys were also operated over the line

The Sea Beach Railway was soon leased by the Brooklyn Union Elevated, but the other two lines — the Culver and the West End — continued to be operated separately. On November 30, 1912, the Brooklyn Union Elevated Railroad, Canarsie Railroad, and Sea Beach Railway merged to form the New York Consolidated Railroad.

The New York Municipal Railway was incorporated on September 27, 1912, in order to lease the BRT lines built by the city under Contract 4 of the Dual Contracts. This lease was made for 49 years from January 1, 1917. Under the terms of the contract, the two systems were to be operated as one, and the city had the right of recapture, under which it could take back the lines it owned for city operation after ten years. Contract 4 elevated lines were completed above the West End tracks in 1917 and the Culver tracks in 1920, ending elevated operations on the surface. Despite being leased to the New York Municipal Railway, all the new lines were operated by the elevated company - the New York Consolidated Railroad.

The following construction was done under Contract 4:

- Broadway Subway, Lower Manhattan to Long Island City, Queens
- Canal Street Subway, Lower Manhattan
- Centre Street Loop Subway, Lower Manhattan
- Gravesend Avenue Elevated, Coney Island, Brooklyn to Sunset Park, Brooklyn
- Eastern District Subway, Midtown Manhattan to East New York, Brooklyn
- Fourth Avenue Subway, Bay Ridge, Brooklyn to Downtown Brooklyn
- New Utrecht Avenue Elevated, Coney Island, Brooklyn to Sunset Park, Brooklyn
- Trackage rights over the Astoria Elevated and Corona Elevated in Queens, leased to the Interborough Rapid Transit Company

The following construction was done at the New York Municipal Railway's own expense:

- Brighton Beach Elevated reconstruction, Coney Island
- Flatbush Avenue Subway, Prospect Park, Brooklyn to Downtown Brooklyn
- Jamaica Avenue Elevated, Cypress Hills, Brooklyn to Jamaica, Queens
- Liberty Avenue Elevated, City Line, Brooklyn to Ozone Park, Queens
- Lutheran Cemetery Elevated, Ridgewood, Queens to Middle Village, Queens
- Sea Beach Line reconstruction (depressed), Coney Island to Bay Ridge, Brooklyn
- Stillwell Avenue Terminal at Coney Island
- Express (third) track on the Broadway Elevated, Fulton Street Elevated, and Myrtle Avenue Elevated

== BMT (1923–1940) ==
The New York Consolidated Railroad and New York Municipal Railway were merged in June 1923, the same month that the Brooklyn Rapid Transit Company was reorganized as the Brooklyn–Manhattan Transit Corporation, to form the New York Rapid Transit Corporation. The remaining Contract 4 lines were soon completed. On June 1, 1940, the New York City Board of Transportation took over operations.

BMT services were assigned numbers in 1924, which appeared only on the fronts of trains and in schedules. In 1960, the New York City Transit Authority brought the BMT into the IND letter system, and most services were reassigned as letters. Since then, many changes have been made; see the individual articles about the letters for more detail, and New York City Subway nomenclature for more general information.

Terminals shown in the table below are pre-letters. This chart shows the letter code assigned to each BMT service in 1960; important changes happened on a few lines between then and when the letters were first publicly used. While the BMT number code was officially retired in the 1960s, two of these markers would continue to appear on equipment until as late as the early 1980s. For instance the BMT 7 marker appeared on Franklin Avenue Shuttle trains as late as 1982.

		1939 service	Notes
BMT Southern Division
1	Brighton Beach Line	Queensboro Plaza – Stillwell Avenue (local via Tunnel); 57th Street – Stillwell Avenue (local via Bridge); Times Square – Brighton Beach (express via Bridge)	
2	Fourth Avenue Line	Queensboro Plaza – 95th Street (local via Tunnel)	
3	West End Line	Times Square – Stillwell Avenue (express via Bridge); Chambers Street – Bay Parkway (local loop service via Nassau Street)	
4	Sea Beach Line	Times Square – Stillwell Avenue (express via Bridge)	
5	Culver Line	Chambers Street – Stillwell Avenue (local via Tunnel); Sands Street – Stillwell Avenue (local via Fifth Avenue Elevated)	truncated on October 30, 1954
6	Fifth Avenue – Bay Ridge Line	Sands Street – 65th Street (local)	closed May 31, 1940
7	Brighton–Franklin Line	Franklin Avenue – Prospect Park (local)	shuttle
BMT Queens Division
8	Astoria Line	Queensboro Plaza – Ditmars Avenue (local)	became the "other end" for service labels in fall 1949
9	Flushing Line	Queensboro Plaza – Main Street (local)	formerly known as Corona Line became IRT-only in fall 1949 also known as World's Fair – Flushing Line
BMT Eastern Division
10	Myrtle Avenue – Chambers Street Line	Chambers Street – Metropolitan Avenue (local)	
11	Myrtle Avenue Line	Sands Street – Metropolitan Avenue (local)	closed October 4, 1969
12	Lexington Avenue Line	Park Row – Eastern Parkway (local)	closed October 13, 1950
13	Fulton Street Line	Park Row – Lefferts Avenue (local)	part west of Rockaway Avenue closed May 31, 1940; part west of 80th Street closed April 26, 1956, with remainder becoming part of the IND
14	Broadway (Brooklyn) Line	Canal Street – Rockaway Parkway (local)	formerly known as Canarsie Line before 16 was finished on July 14, 1928
15	Jamaica Line	Broad Street – 168th Street (local)	
16	14th Street-Canarsie Line	Eighth Avenue – Rockaway Parkway (local)	formerly known as 14th Street–Eastern Line until July 14, 1928

== Divisions ==
The BMT's predecessor BRT organized the rapid transit lines into two divisions, the Eastern Division and the Southern Division. When BMT service began on the Corona and Astoria Lines in 1923, a Queens Division was added. When the dual-operated Queens lines were divided between the BMT and IRT in 1949, the Queens Division was dissolved.

All the lines running to southern Brooklyn, including the Brighton–Franklin Line plus the Broadway Line as far as Queensboro Plaza and the BMT Nassau Street Line as far north as Chambers Street constitute the Southern Division. All the rest of the system is in the Eastern Division except the Astoria and Flushing Lines, which were previously the Queens Division (see above). The Astoria Line has been part of the Southern Division since 1949.

The divisions maintained separate car fleets and maintenance bases, to the extent that some types of cars were assigned only to one division or the other, and common equipment, such as the BMT Standards, were nevertheless divided by car number between the divisions.

Equipment	Introduced	Code	Division	Notes
Gate cars	to 1910	BU	All	Blocks of cars assigned to all three
Standards	1915-24	AB	East / South	Blocks of car assigned to Eastern and Southern
C-types	1923	C	Eastern	Converted from gate cars
Triplex	1925-27	D	Southern	Articulated units
Multi-Section	1936	MS	Eastern	Articulated cars
World's Fair	1939	Q	Queens	Converted from gate cars
R16	1953	R16	Eastern	Under NYCTA
R27/30	1960-61	R27/R30	Southern	Under NYCTA
R32s	1964-65	R32	Southern	Under NYCTA

The distinction between Eastern and Southern BMT Divisions continues to date, partly for operational and maintenance reasons, and partly because the Eastern Division is limited to the shorter 60-foot cars. When the Chrystie Street Connection joined the IND and BMT operationally in 1967, it did not change the Division boundaries, but it did break the strict assignment of types of car to one division or another.

Prior to Chrystie Street, operation of a service on both divisions was exceedingly rare, until the QJ and RJ services were introduced in 1967. There were some instances of joint trackage, mainly on the Nassau Street Line and approaching Brooklyn Bridge. Currently, there is no service operating on both divisions.

When the BMT introduced line numbers in 1924, it divided them by division: 1 to 4, the Southern Division subway services, 5, 6 and 7, the Southern Division elevated services, 8 and 9 to the Queens Division and 10 to 16, the Eastern Division services.

In 1940, with City ownership, the Divisions were officially restyled as "Sections" to avoid having Divisions of Divisions: i.e., "BMT Division, Eastern Section" but they are usually still referred to as "Divisions" to the present.

== After 1940 ==
Current BMT lines in Manhattan are exclusively subway. Its Brooklyn lines include one long subway line, the Fourth Avenue Line, and one subway connector, hooking the pre-existing Brighton Beach Line to the main subway at a large flying junction at DeKalb and Flatbush Avenues. The remaining Brooklyn lines are on elevated structures, in open cuts or on embankments, or on short portions of surface trackage. Several Brooklyn lines extend into Queens, and these are elevated, except for Middle Village-Metropolitan Avenue on the Myrtle Avenue Line, which is on an embankment, and the BMT Archer Avenue Line, a stub underground line which opened in 1989, with IND services operating above it. The BMT's only line in Queens which comes directly from Manhattan, the BMT Astoria Line, is entirely elevated.
