= BU cars (New York City Subway car) =

Retired class of Brooklyn Rapid Transit car

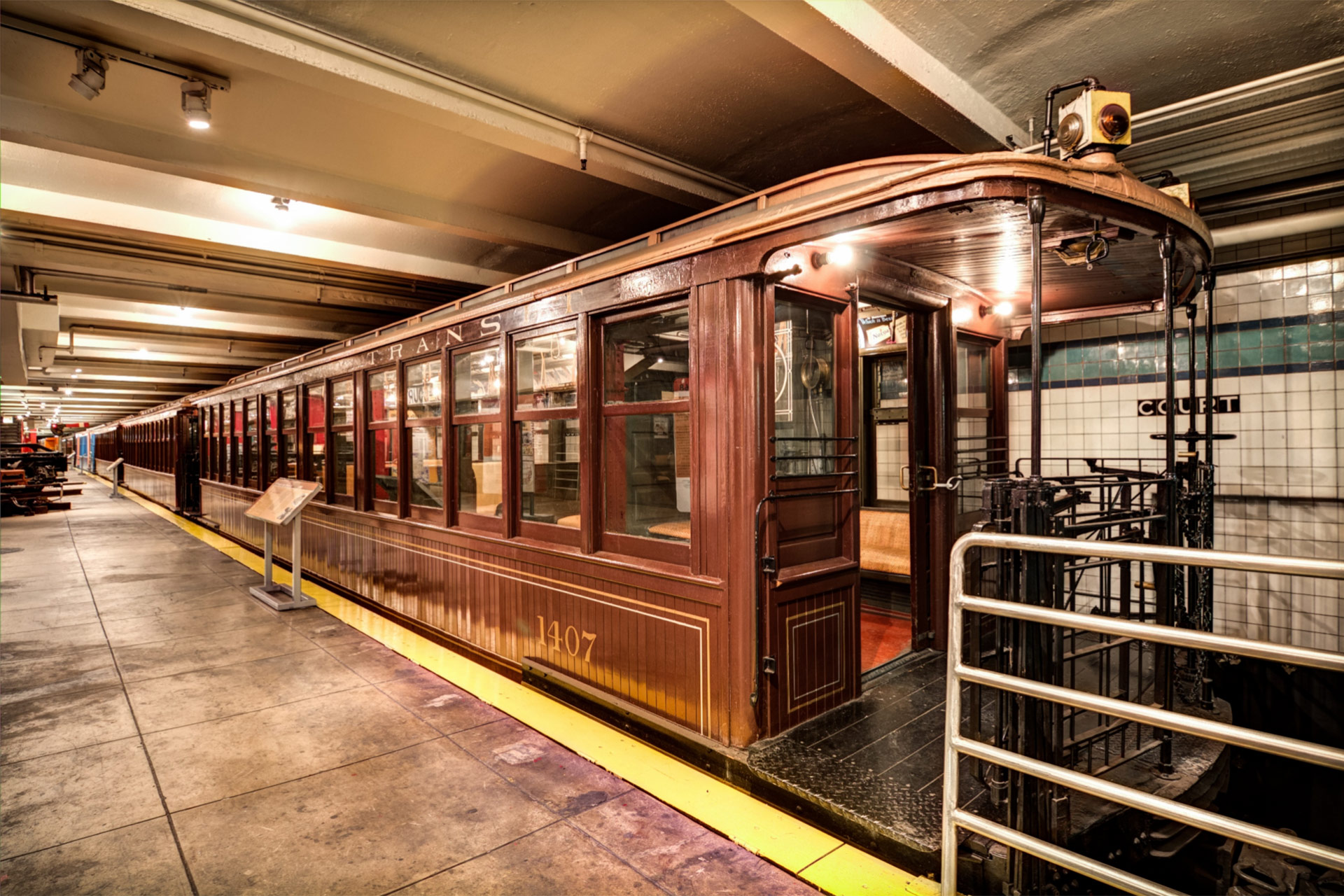
BU car 1407 on display at the New York Transit Museum

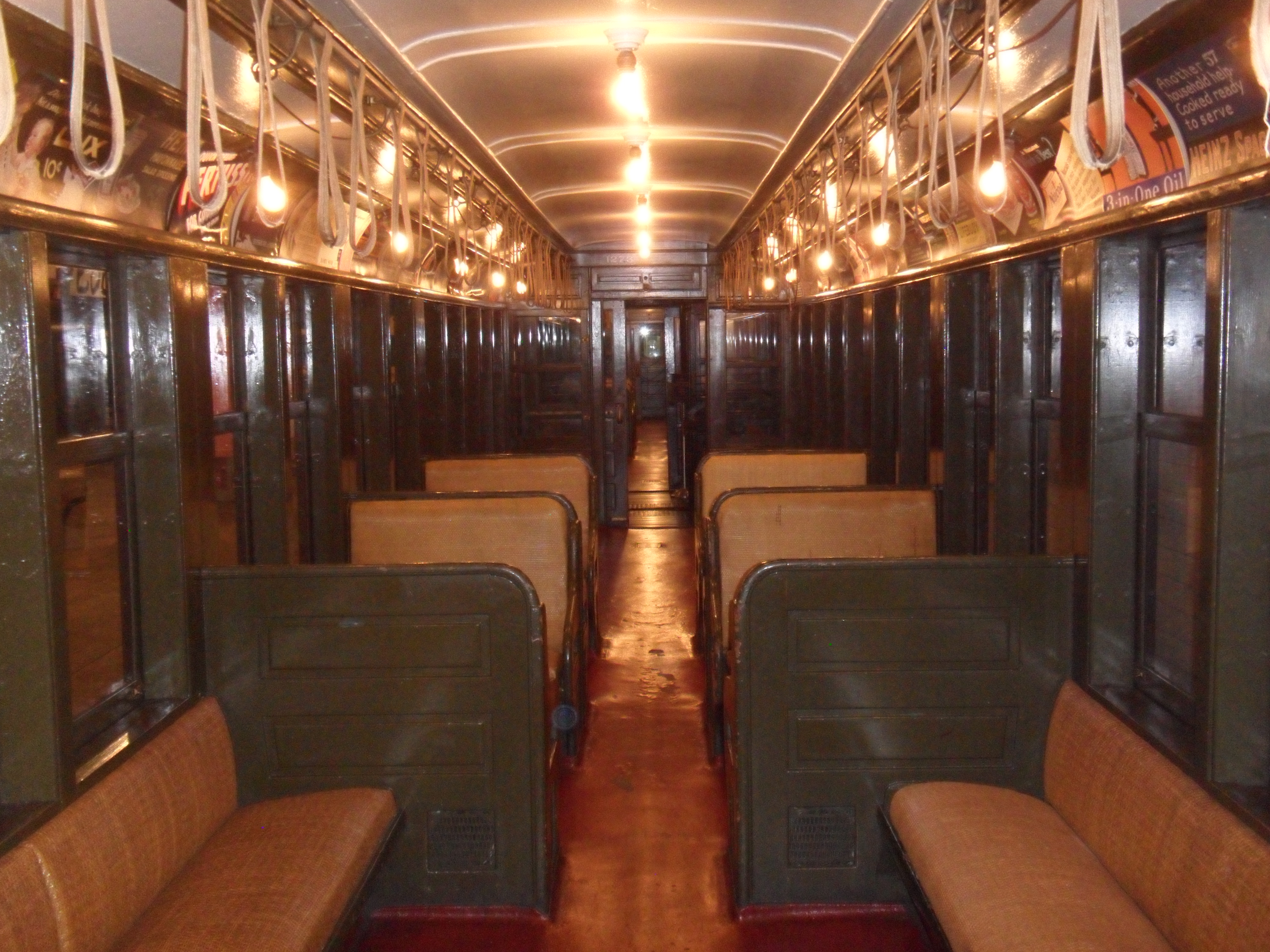
Interior of a BU car

BU cars is the generic term for BRT elevated gate cars used on predecessor lines of the New York City Subway system. Various orders of these cars were built by the Osgood-Bradley, Brill, Cincinnati, Laconia, Pullman, Gilbert & Bush, Harlan & Hollingsworth, Wason, Pressed Steel, Brooklyn Heights Railroad, John Stephenson, and Jewett car companies.

== Background ==
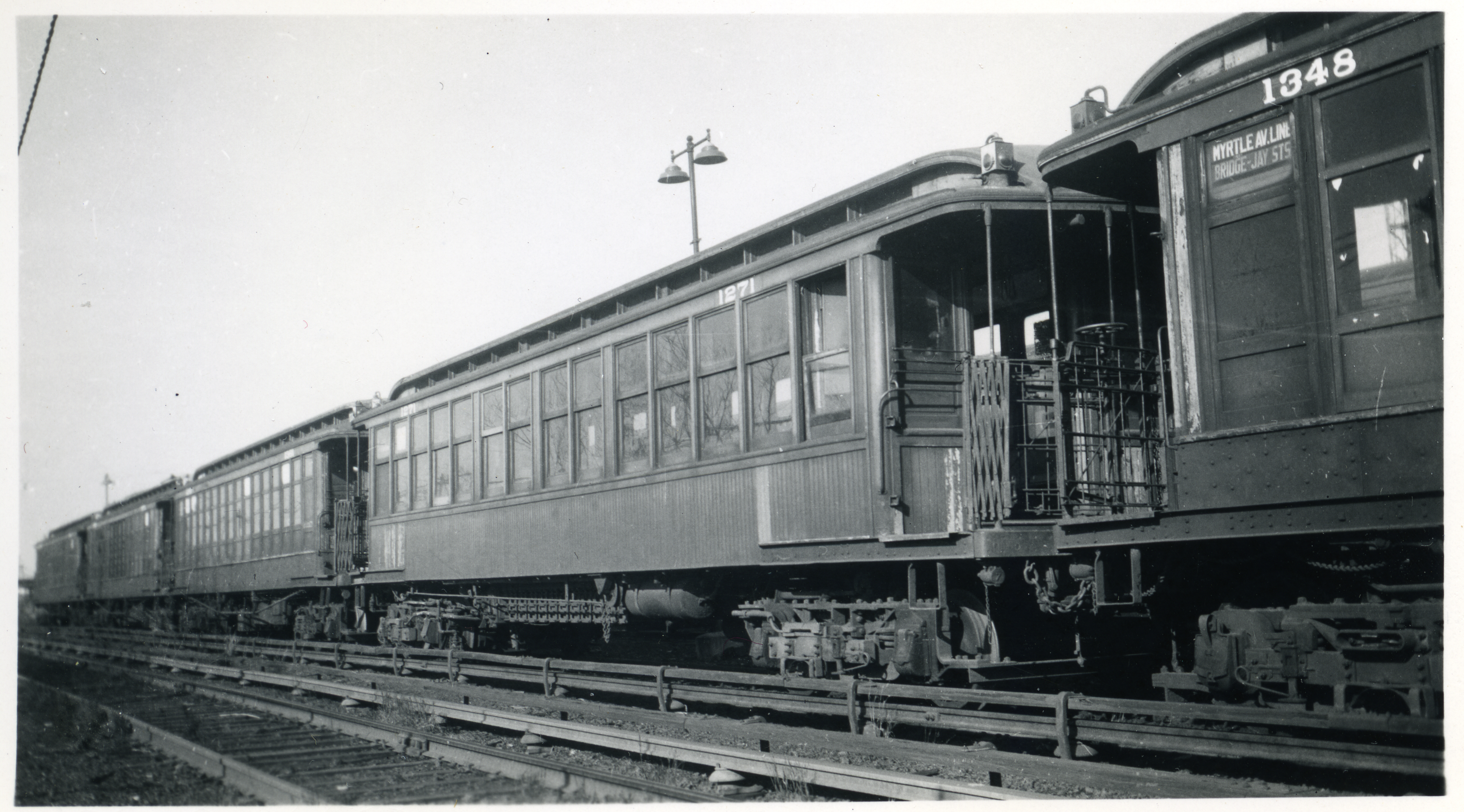
BU cars in a yard

These cars consisted of a variety of equipment used on the BRT and later BMT. Some cars were inherited from steam railroads that became part of the BRT, while others were built new for the BRT as late as 1907. In 1913, the BRT introduced an advanced steel car design for subway service (the AB Standard), thus ending BU cars' production.

The term BU was derived from the Brooklyn Union Elevated Railroad (BUERR) Company, one of the last operating companies of Brooklyn elevated lines before the BRT formed the New York Consolidated Railroad in 1912 to absorb the BUERR and other properties.

Historians disagree as to whether the term "BU" was commonly used before the BMT was purchased by the City of New York in 1940, or whether it was mainly an introduced term to describe the wooden elevated cars of the former private company.

== Disambiguation ==
The primary distinguishing feature of BU cars is that they were elevated cars built mostly or substantially of wood, with or without steel frames, where passenger access to the cars was provided by open platforms at both ends of each car. A trainman between each pair of cars manually opened and closed folding gates to admit or bar passengers from entering or leaving.

All gate cars used in BRT elevated service can be described as BUs. This excludes several classes of elevated equipment:

- Steam coaches of companies preceding the BUERR that were never converted to, and used in, regular BUERR or BRT elevated service;
- Steam excursion coaches of the former Sea Beach Railway that were acquired by the BRT ("3200 class") but not used in elevated service and numbered as part of the streetcar department;
- Former BU cars (the C-types and Q-types) that were converted into closed cars and the gates replaced by automatically operated subway-style sliding doors.

The BU cars should not be confused with the Manhattan El cars, a series of gate cars that were operated by the Interborough Rapid Transit Company.

== BUs in the New York Transit Museum fleet ==
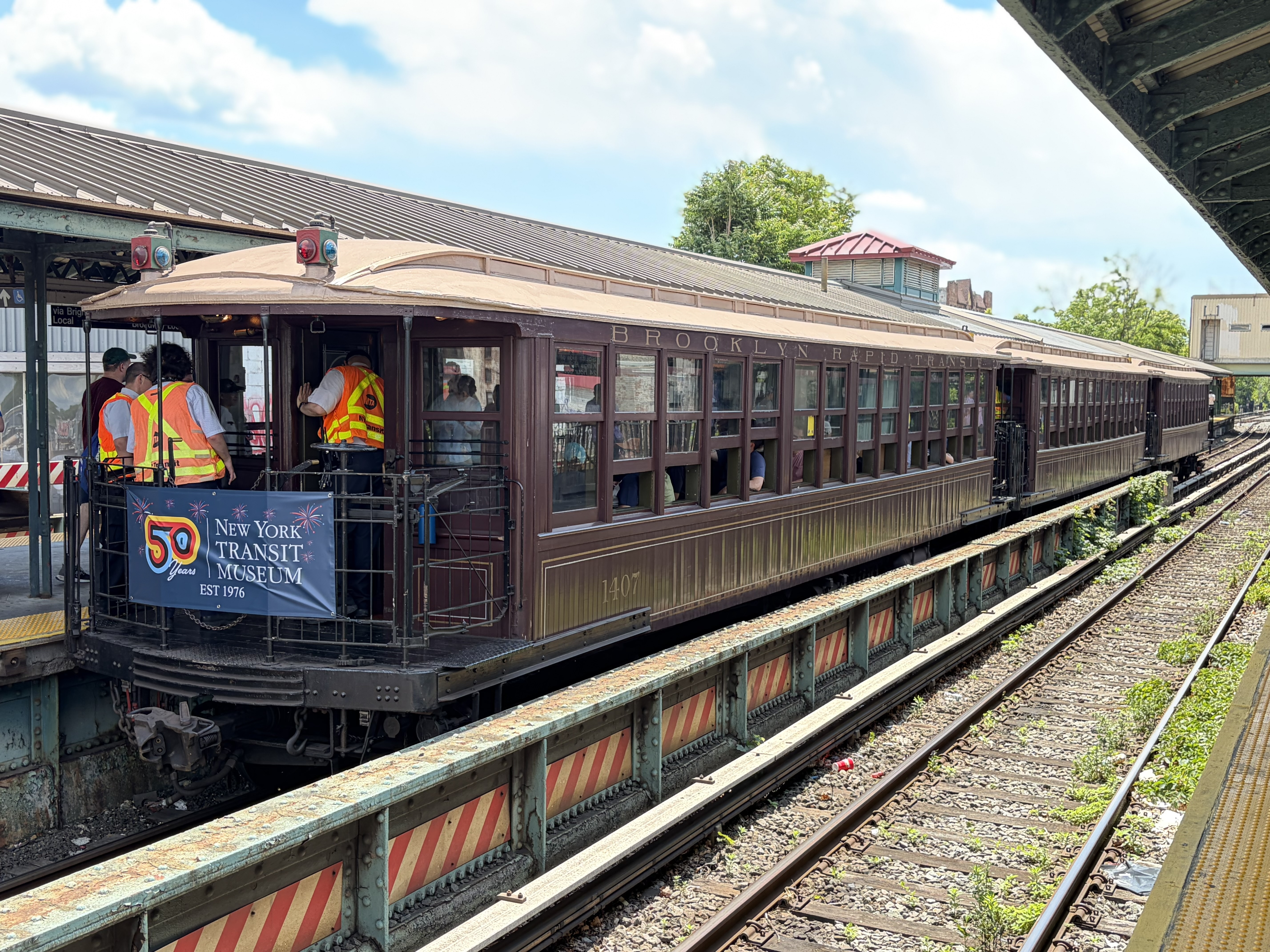
The three operating BU cars preparing for an excursion trip along the BMT Brighton Line in June 2026

Background of NYC Transit Museum BU cars
Current Numbers	1407	1273	1404
1970 numbers	1622A	1622B	1622C
1957 numbers	1622A	1622B	1603C
1937 numbers	1407	1273	1404
Body builder	Jewett	Laconia	Jewett
Frame builder	Pressed Steel	Pressed Steel	Pressed Steel
Build Date	1907	1903	1907

Three BU cars that were converted to closed Q-type cars in 1938 for BMT service to the 1939 New York World's Fair were converted back into BU gate cars in the Coney Island Rapid Transit Car Overhaul Shop for the transit museum in 1979. The conversion was made of wood with steel frames and dates from 1903 to 1907. However, the cars retain their 1957 lowered roofs and 1950 lightweight trucks, as well as modified marker light positions on the ends. They also remain unitized as a three car set, rather than as three self-contained cars as originally built.

These cars are the oldest operational members of the New York Transit Museum fleet. Those built in 1907 were the last BU cars ever built. They are fully operational and are occasionally used on museum-sponsored excursions; however, when the excursion goes through underground subway tunnels, they must be towed by steel cars. For safety reasons, passengers may not ride in these cars in subway tunnels; non-employees must ride in the accompanying steel cars during the tunnel portions of the trip.

The three museum BUs are currently numbered and coupled as 1407-1273-1404. They were rebuilt from Q-type unit 1622A-B-C in the late 1970s. As part of the June 22, 1965 "Transit Day" commemoration at the World's Fair, Q-type 1622A-B-C were rehabilitated and repainted in the original colors used for the 1939–40 World's Fair, blue and orange, which are also the colors of the New York City flag. After they were converted back into gate cars, they were given their original numbers and received the red paint scheme that they originally wore when they were brand new.

== Other surviving BUs ==
Besides the three cars preserved at the New York Transit Museum, many other still-extant cars have been preserved;

- Cars 197, 659, 999, 1227, 1349, and 1362 are preserved at the Shore Line Trolley Museum. Some have been modified with trolley poles and are occasionally (but not often) used for trips around the museum, while others need restoration. Cars 1227 and 1349 are under active restoration as of 2025.
- Car 1365 is preserved at the St. Louis Museum of Transportation. It is currently a static display.
