= C-type (New York City Subway car) =

Retired class of Brooklyn Rapid Transit cars

- A C-type train at Crescent Street on the former BMT Fulton Street Line.
- In service: 1923–1956
- Manufacturer: Osgood Bradley Car Company; Laconia Car Company; Jewett Car Company; Brooklyn Rapid Transit Company
- Constructed: 1923–1925
- Number built: 90 cars assembled into 30 units
- Number preserved: 0
- Number scrapped: 90
- Formation: Three-car sets
- Fleet numbers: 1500–1526 A-B-C
- Capacity: 46 (A and C cars), 44 (B car)
- Operators: Brooklyn Rapid Transit; Brooklyn–Manhattan Transit Corporation; NYC Board of Transportation; New York City Transit Authority

Specifications
- Car body construction: (Motorized end cars) steel underframe, upright body members, and motorman's cab, remainder wood and canvas. (Trailer center cars) substantially wood construction with steel hardware and turnbuckles.
- Train length: 137 feet (41.8 m) over the extreme ends of each unit
- Car length: 49 feet 3 inches (15.01 m)
- Width: 8 feet 9 inches (2.67 m), but ~10 feet (3.05 m) with roof and floor extension to reach platforms without creating a gap.
- Height: varied, approximately 10 feet 5 inches (3.18 m)
- Weight: 76,970 lb (34,913 kg) (A and C cars), 43,170 lb (19,582 kg) (B car)
- Traction system: WH USG251-1-3; WH 300; WH 50L
- Power output: 200 hp (150 kW), 150 hp (110 kW)
- Track gauge: 4 ft 8 1/2 in (1,435 mm)

The C-type was a series of elevated New York City Subway cars originally built by the Osgood-Bradley, Laconia, and Jewett car companies, and rebuilt by the Brooklyn Rapid Transit Company between 1923 and 1925 from former BU cars.

== Description ==
The C-types were numbered 1500–1526 A-B-C. Each C-type unit contained 3 cars semi-permanently coupled to form an operating unit. They consisted of a relatively modern steel-framed motor car at each end, originally built in 1903 (former 1200 series car) or 1907 (former 1400 series car) and a steam-era trailer car in the middle, originally built in 1893 (former 100 series car). All of the conversions were done in the shops of the BRT. The 1200 series cars were numerically replaced by cars from other series.

The conversion was done in order to create a fleet of elevated cars with automatic door controls capable of operating on the BMT Fulton Street Line, whose station platforms had been redone to accommodate 10-foot-wide (3.05 m) equipment instead of the standard 8-foot-9-inch-wide (2.67 m) elevated cars. The gates and platforms at the ends of each three-car unit were enclosed and a motorman's cab placed in each.

The interior gates and platforms of individual cars were removed, and passageways were created between the cars in each unit so passengers could walk from car to car without going outside. Two doorways were cut into each side of each car of the unit, and outside-hung sliding doors were attached to the cars. Despite the C-type's general appearance and the passageways between cars, they were not articulated units, since each car of the unit could stand alone on its own two trucks, while articulated units share trucks underneath the inter-car passageway.

The 2 prototypes of the C-type units, created in 1923, presented a fairly neat appearance. However, the 25 production units created in 1925, with their varying roof heights, floor extensions to reach the platforms, and roof extensions to contain the hangers for the sliding doors presented such an ungainly appearance that they have been popularly characterized as the ugliest equipment ever to run on the New York City subway system. These cars were nicknamed the "ugly ducklings" because of their appearance.

== History ==
The cars spent almost their entire lives on the Fulton St. Line, except at the very beginning when they were first tested on the Franklin Ave. Shuttle. In 1953 and 1954, several units were used on the rush hour West End and Culver Coney Island extension shuttles until December 1953, when through subway service on the West End Line was finally established, and October 1954, when Culver Line service below Ditmas Ave. was taken over by the IND Division. The units used in these latter services were retired when the services were discontinued; the remaining units soldiered on the Fulton St. service until 1956, when the last original portions of the Fulton Street elevated were abandoned and later demolished. Until 1956, the Multi-Section cars running from Manhattan on the 14th St. Line, connected with the Fulton St. Line at Atlantic Ave. from which point, in a special rush hour service, they shared the trackage with the C-types over the outer portion of the line to Lefferts Blvd.

The C-types last ran on the Fulton St. service in April 1956, at which point the IND's extension of the Fulton St. Subway took over operation of the outermost portion of the line. No examples of the C-types were preserved. (Note: All of the above additional information was obtained from the New York Division Bulletin of the Electric Railroaders' Association, from the Headlights publication of the same organization, from New York City Subways, Centennial Edition, by Gene Sansone, and from various transit employee records.)
