= Trolley Museum of New York =

Museum in Kingston, NY, USA

Coordinates: 41°55′13.11″N 73°58′47.88″W

The Trolley Museum of New York is a non-profit organization located at 89 East Strand Street in Kingston, New York. The museum is open to the public on a seasonal schedule, but volunteer activities relating to the preservation of historic transit are year-round.

== History ==
The museum was founded in 1955 in Brooklyn to save some of the last trolley cars still in New York City. During the early years of the museum's existence, it had no permanent home. The growing collection of trolley and subway cars were stored in various locations, such as Staten Island and northern New Jersey. On a few occasions until the city took down the last of the overhead wire in the early 1960s, the museum operated a Swedish trolley car on McDonald Avenue, Brooklyn. The museum also held movie nights for members in a Peter Witt streetcar at St. George, Staten Island.

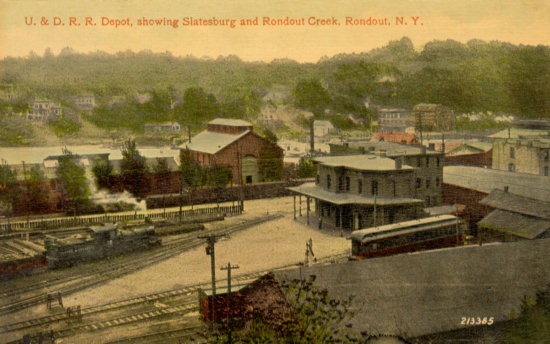
The railroad yard at Rondout.

In 1983 the museum finally found a permanent home in Kingston, occupying the abandoned Rondout shops area, MP 1, of the Ulster and Delaware Railroad (U&D). As a condition of the museum's charter with the city of Kingston, the museum had to immediately begin public operations. At the time, everything in the museum collection was electric powered and the U&D tracks were not equipped for electric operation. The museum acquired a Doodlebug (a former Sperry Rail Service car) from Connecticut and began public operation on July 4, 1983. At first, less than a mile of track was usable, but within two years the run was extended to Kingston Point to provide scenic views of the Hudson River. In 2000 the museum began operating a trolley from Johnstown, Pennsylvania after a nine-year restoration.

The museum leases the yard and about 1.5 miles of right of way and track from the City of Kingston. This includes the former U&D main line from Kingston Point, MP 0, to about MP 1.1, plus a spur track that runs from the yard along Ferry Street to T. R. Gallo Park at Rondout Landing. The Museum operates on a seasonal schedule on weekends and holidays.

== Equipment ==
The Trolley Museum of NY has numerous notable items in their collection.

Rapid Transit Cars
Name	Class	Images	Manufacturer	Year built	Status	Notes
IRT Lines 5600	Standard Lo-V (New York City Subway car)	N/A	ACF	1916-1925	Awaiting restoration	Oldest rapid transit car in the collection
BMT Lines 1602A	Q-Type	N/A	View page	1938	Awaiting restoration	N/A
Independent Subway System 825	R4	N/A	ACF	1933	Awaiting restoration	N/A
BMT Lines 6398	R16		ACF	1955	On display	Features blue doors
SEPTA 618	M-3 (Market Frankford El)		Budd	1960	On display	Donated from the Seashore Trolley Museum
PATH 143	PA-1		St. Louis	1964	On display	Survived the collapse of the World Trade Center complex on September 11, 2001
MARTA 510	CQ310 (Single unit)		Société Franco-Belge	1978-1979	On display	

Trollies/InterurbanLocomotives
Name	Class	Images	Manufacturer	Year built	Status	Notes
Brussels Tram 1504	"Brussels Standard" cars		N/A	N/A	On display	
Oslo Tram 3	N/A		N/A	1897	On display	On display at T.R. Gallo Park
Gothenburg Tram 69	N/A	N/A	ASEA	1912	On display	On display at T.R. Gallo Park
Johnstown Traction Company 358	N/A		St. Louis	1925	Operational	Most used for excursions
Brooklyn and Queens Transit 1000	PCC (Air electric)	N/A	Clark Equipment Co.	1936	On display	Only PCC built by Clark
MBTA 3204	PCC streetcar		N/A	1946	On display	Only piece of MBTA equipment at the museum
Hamburg Tram 3584	V6E	N/A	Linke-Hoffman-Busch	1952	On display	
Name	Class	Images	Manufacturer	Year built	Status	Notes
Whitcomb 9	65 Tonner		Whitcomb	1943	Operational	Built for the US Army

This museum also has three RTS type buses.
