= Q-type Queens car (New York City Subway car) =

Retired class of New York City Subway car

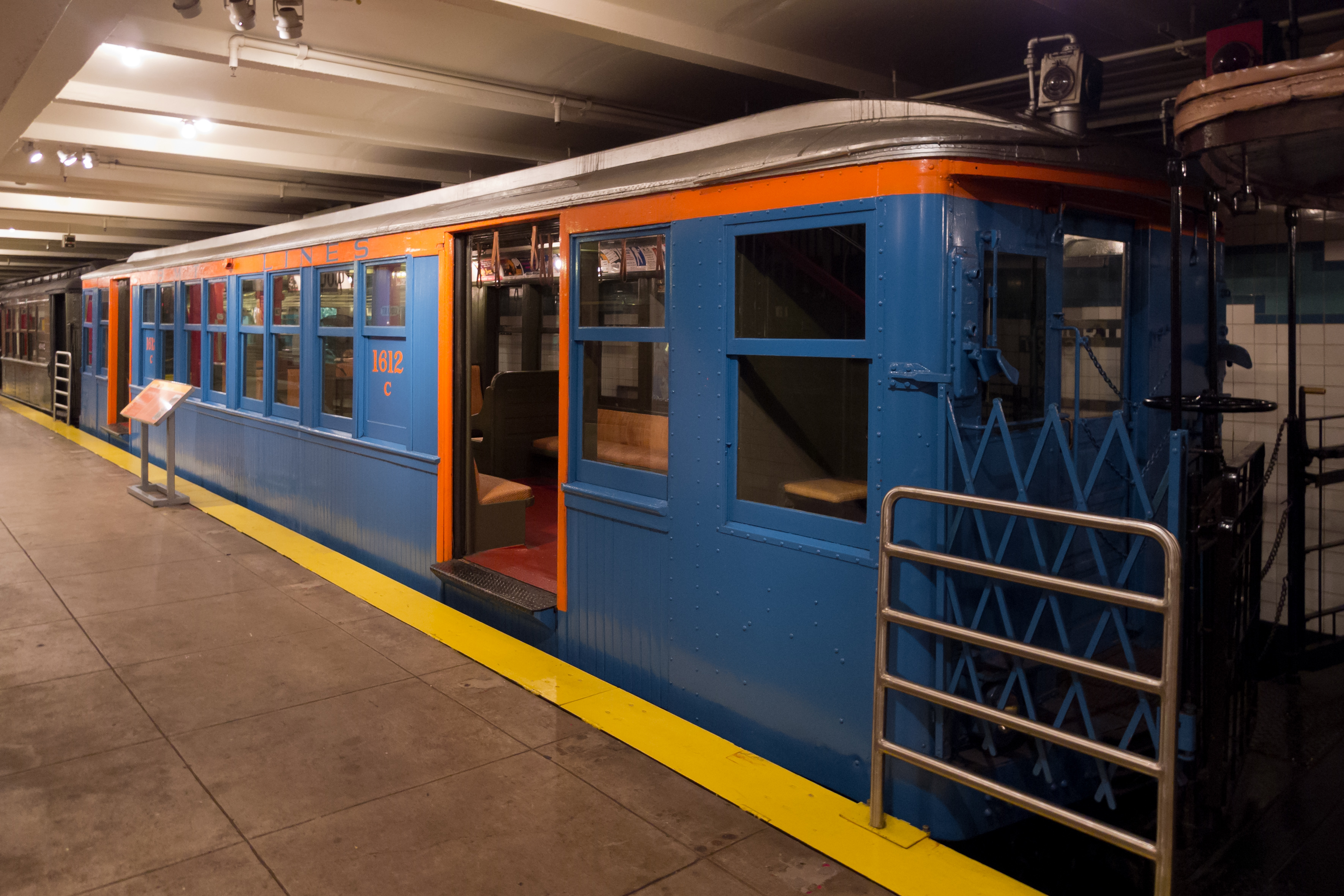
- BMT Q-type car #1612C on display at the New York Transit Museum

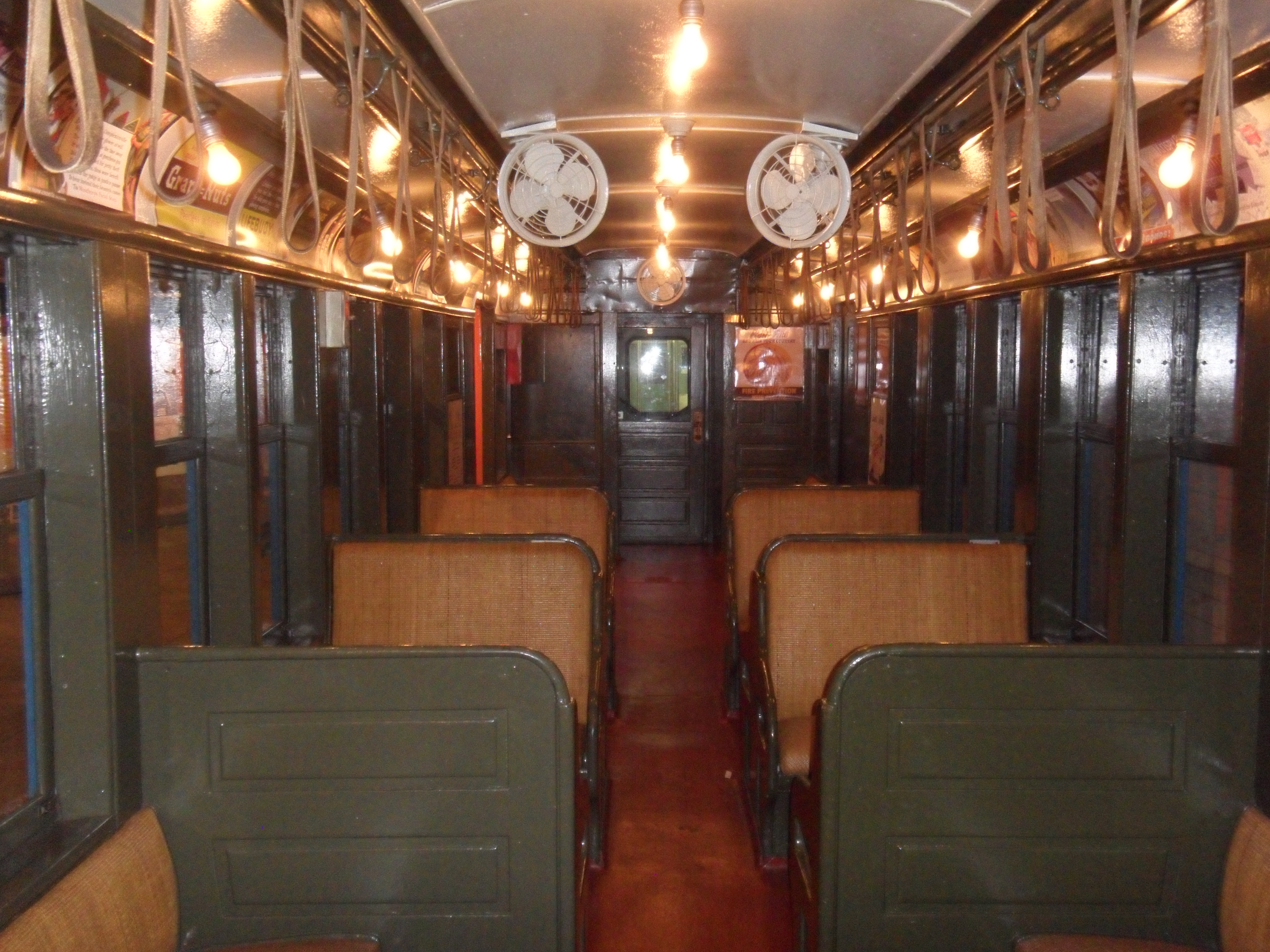
- Interior view of Q-type car 1612C
- In service: 1938–1969
- Manufacturer: Osgood Bradley Car Company; J. G. Brill Company; Laconia Car Company; Jewett Car Company; Brooklyn–Manhattan Transit Corporation
- Constructed: 1938
- Number built: 114 cars assembled into 42 operating units
- Number preserved: 2
- Number scrapped: 109
- Formation: Three-car sets (Q) or two-car sets (QX)
- Fleet numbers: 1600–1629 A-B-C (Q); 1630–1642 A-B (QX)
- Capacity: 50 seats (A and C cars), 52 seats (B car)(Q) / 50 seats (A and B cars)(QX)
- Operators: Brooklyn–Manhattan Transit Corporation; NYC Board of Transportation; New York City Transit Authority

Specifications
- Car body construction: Wood with steel frames and ends
- Train length: 137 feet (41.8 m) over the extreme ends of each unit
- Car length: 49 feet 3 inches (15.01 m)
- Width: 8 feet 8 inches (2.64 m)
- Height: 12 feet (3.66 m)
- Weight: 57,000 lb (26,000 kg)
- Traction system: WH 225113 (Q); WH 225112 (QX); GE 259, WH 336 (Q, 1 per motor truck); WH 300 (QX, 2 per motor truck)
- Power output: 120 hp (89 kW) per motor (Q); 200 hp (150 kW) per motor (QX)
- Track gauge: 4 ft 8 1/2 in (1,435 mm) (standard gauge)

The Q-type and QX were a New York City Subway car class originally built by the Osgood-Bradley, Brill, Laconia, and Jewett car companies, and rebuilt in 1938 by the Brooklyn–Manhattan Transit Corporation (BMT) from former BU cars.

== History ==
The Q-types were built for elevated railway service to the 1939 New York World's Fair, though used in both Flushing and Astoria service. They were rebuilt from BU cars in the 1200 and 1400 series, elevated rolling stock originally built in 1903 and 1907. There were 30 three-car Q sets numbered 1600–1629 A-B-C, and 13 two-car QX sets numbered 1630–1642 A-B. The Q sets were arranged in three-car sets with the center car as a trailer, while the QX sets were arranged as married pairs with a motor car and a control trailer. Involved in this conversion were all remaining 1400 series cars that had not been rebuilt to the 1923 C-type conversion, saved for 2 cars that had been independently rebuilt following an accident in 1910. The remaining cars used were 1200 series cars. 22 1200 series cars were left over after completion of the Q-type conversion, 1 of which was converted to a trailer shortly after the city takeover. All trailer cars in these units had originally been of the 1200 series.

After BMT service on the joint IRT-BMT Flushing Line and Astoria Line ended in 1949, the QX-types were all removed from service and placed in work service. The Q-types were refitted for operation on the IRT Third Avenue Line in Manhattan. After the latter line closed in 1955, the Q-types were refitted again to operate on the BMT Myrtle Avenue Line in 1958 to replace the last elevated BU gate cars in passenger service. A year before, a few trains of these freshly rehabilitated units did a one-day test in service on the Franklin Avenue Shuttle on October 10, 1957. Service on Myrtle Avenue finally got underway in July 1958. By September, all of the old convertible gate cars had been retired. The Q-types then spent the next 11 years in service on Myrtle Avenue until the part of the line west of Central Avenue closed on October 4, 1969, when they were finally retired.

== Preservation ==
Today, only two Q-type cars are preserved:

- Car 1602A (ex-BU 1410) is preserved at the Trolley Museum of New York. It is awaiting restoration.
- Car 1612C (ex-BU 1417) is preserved at the New York Transit Museum. This car was previously used as a work car before it was restored to its original condition for the museum collection in 1979. It was painted in its original blue and orange paint scheme (the colors of the New York City flag), which it wore during the 1939 World's Fair.

Q-type set 1622 A-B-C was previously preserved by the New York Transit Museum, but the set was converted back into BU gate cars 1407, 1273, and 1404 (their original numbers prior to conversion) in 1979. However, the cars are still unitized as Q units and thus retain their 1957 lowered roofs, 1950 lightweight trucks and motors, and modified marker light positions on the ends of the units. Car 1612C was subsequently restored to replace 1622 A-B-C for museum display.
