= Chrystie Street Connection =

New York City Subway track connections

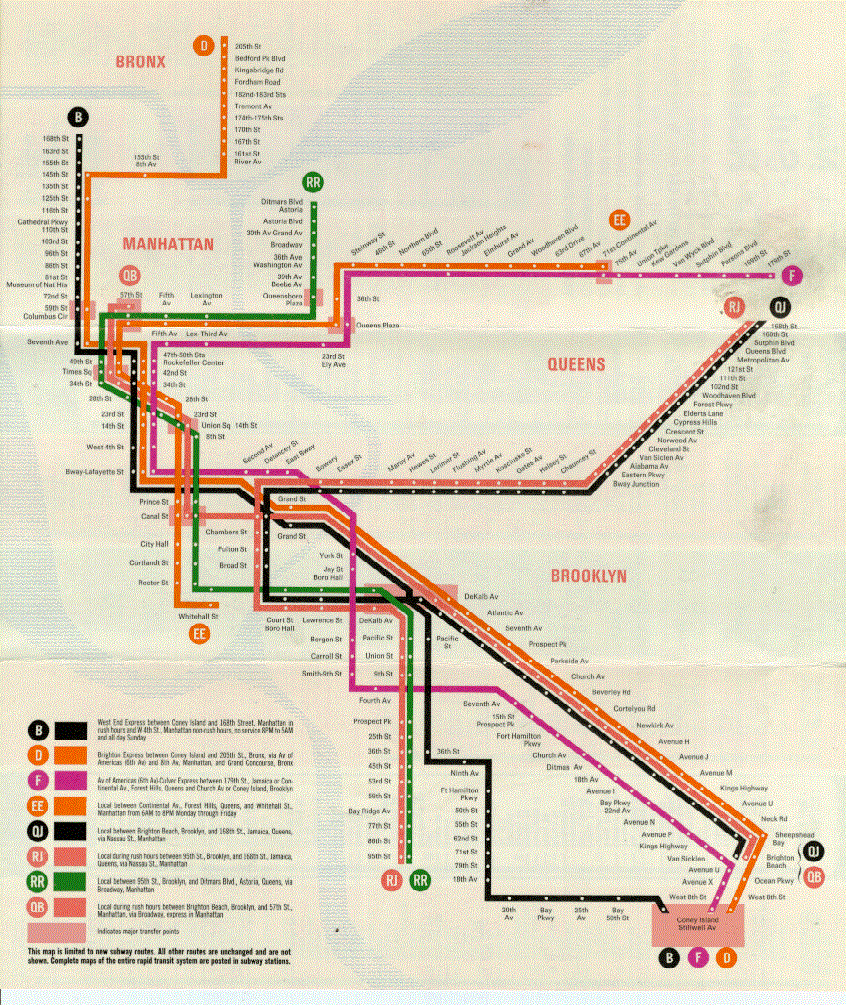
Map of service changes following the connection's opening

The Chrystie Street Connection is a set of New York City Subway tunnels running the length of Chrystie Street on the Lower East Side of Manhattan. It is one of the few track connections between lines of the former Brooklyn–Manhattan Transit Corporation (BMT) and Independent Subway System (IND) divisions, which together constitute the system's B Division. A major branch of the IND Sixth Avenue Line, it connects the Sixth Avenue Line to the BMT Brighton Line and BMT Fourth Avenue Line via the north side of the Manhattan Bridge and to the BMT Jamaica Line over the Williamsburg Bridge. The project, opened in 1967 and 1968, also includes the Sixth Avenue Line's Grand Street and 57th Street stations, the latter of which is not part of the connection itself.

The connection was originally conceived as part of the long delayed Second Avenue Subway, and, along with the three stations added with the opening of phase 1, is one of the few completed sections of the project.

== Route description ==
=== Manhattan Bridge connection ===
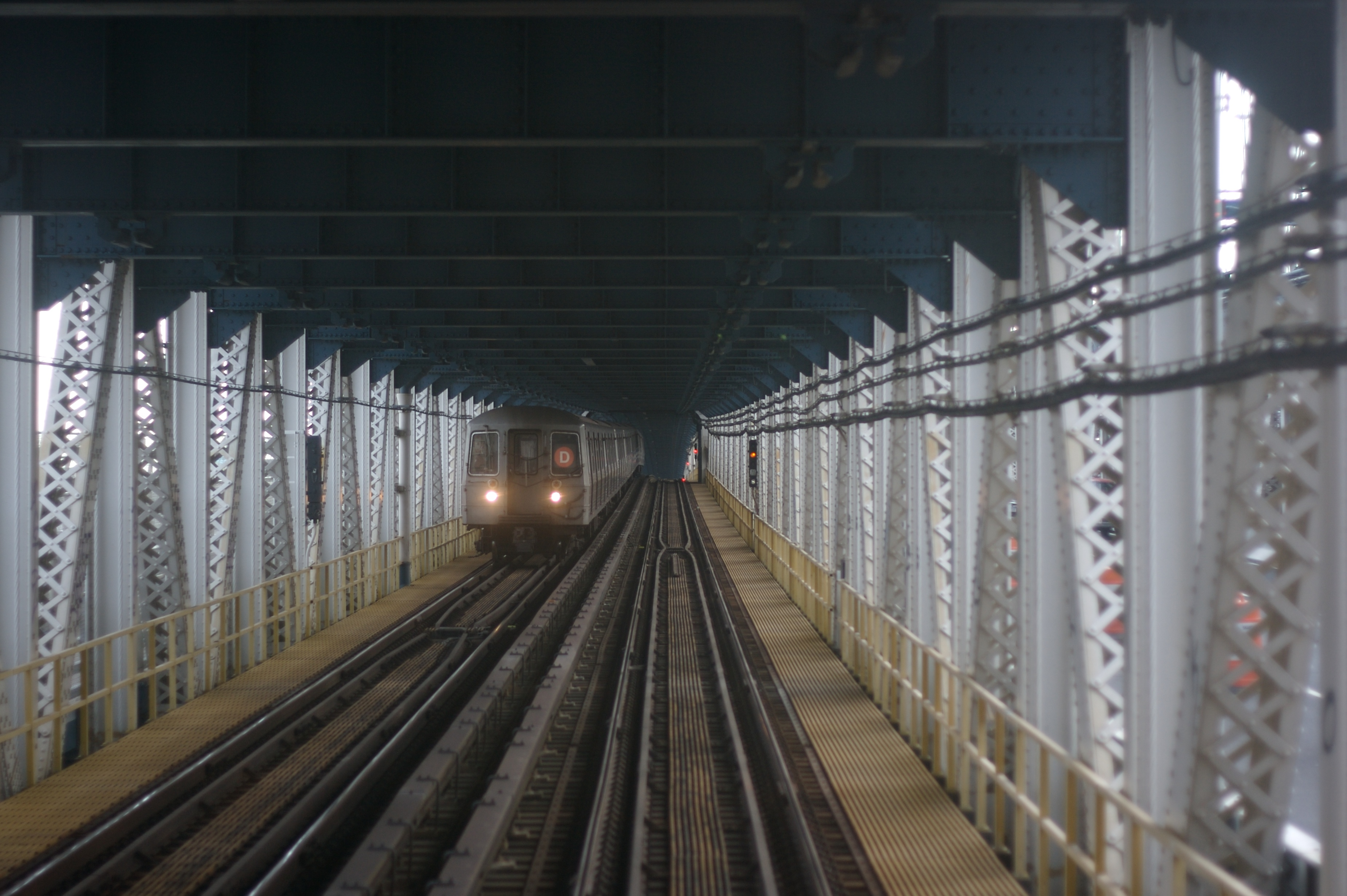
A Manhattan-bound D train of R68s on the north side of the Manhattan Bridge, looking toward Brooklyn

The two tracks that run the full length of the connection begin as a continuation of the IND Sixth Avenue Line express tracks east of Broadway–Lafayette Street. These tracks include the line's only station, Grand Street, and connections to the two northern tracks over the Manhattan Bridge. The IND Sixth Avenue Line express tracks formerly continued east, ending slightly east of the Second Avenue station, and were planned to extend into Brooklyn and beyond as part of a never-built major system expansion called the IND Second System. Those tracks still exist at Second Avenue station, but now connect to the local tracks west of the station.

The two tracks on the north side of the Manhattan Bridge formerly carried trains to the BMT Broadway Line, which now connects to the tracks on the south side of the bridge. The south side tracks had been connected to the BMT Nassau Street Line, carrying the Nassau Street Loop service via Chambers Street from 1915. The northern tracks of the bridge saw heavier traffic loads because it led to Midtown Manhattan, compared to the southern tracks, which made three stops in Lower Manhattan before returning to Brooklyn. As a result of the uneven traffic distribution, the Manhattan Bridge started tilting to its north side. The connection to the Nassau Street Line was cut north of Chambers Street before the Manhattan Bridge and is used for storage from the Nassau Street side.

The opening of the Chrystie Street Connection to the Manhattan Bridge allowed the integration of four major routes of the combined system. The BB service of the IND was through-routed with the T BMT West End Line service as the B, and the D service of the IND was through-routed with the Q BMT Brighton Line service as the D. In 2004, the Brooklyn routes and terminals of the B and D trains were swapped as part of the Manhattan Bridge reconstruction from 1986 to 2004.

=== Williamsburg Bridge connection ===
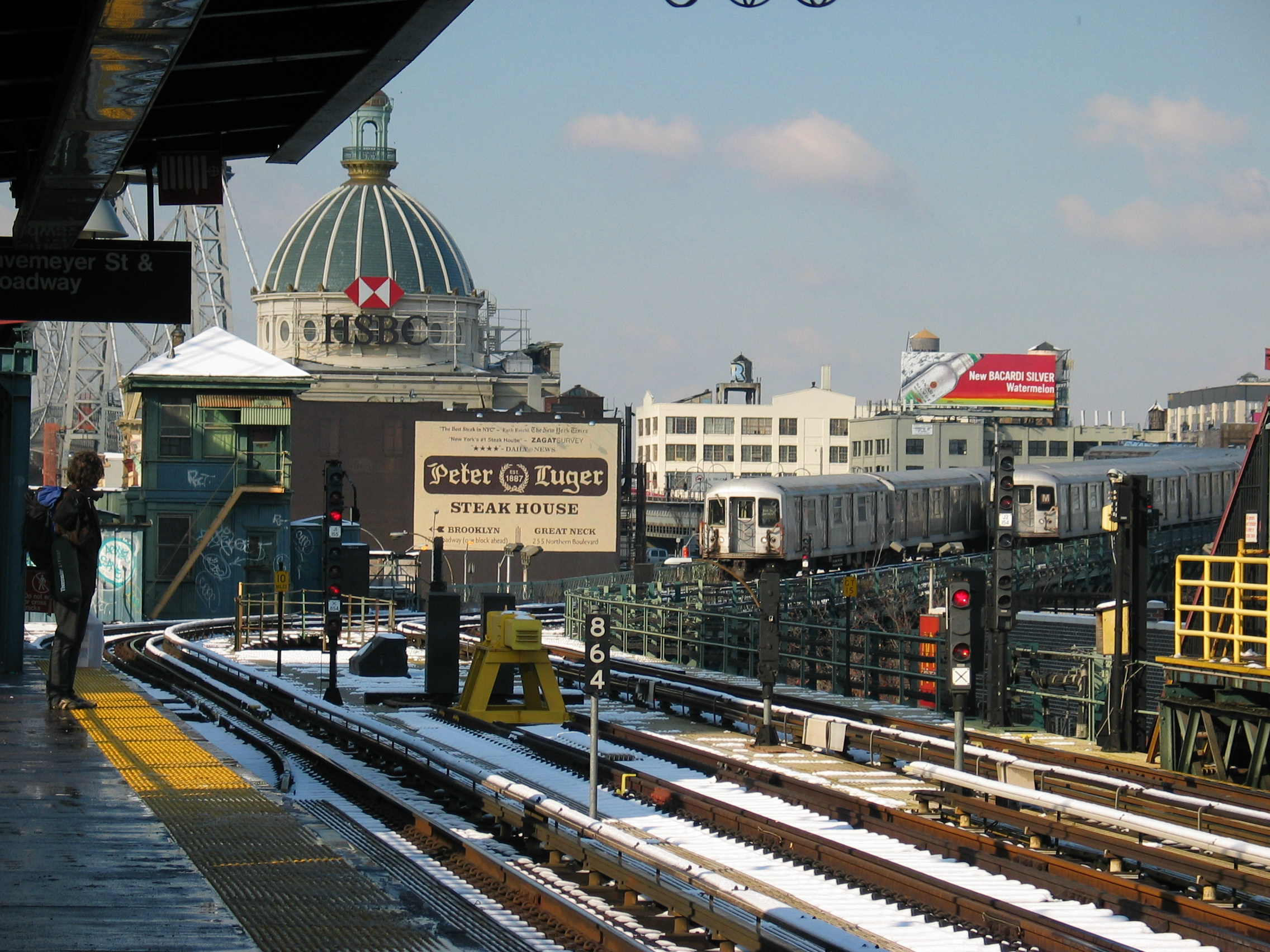
Two trains of R42s pass on the S-curve connecting the Williamsburg Bridge to Marcy Avenue

The two tracks that connect to the Williamsburg Bridge split from the Sixth Avenue Line local tracks east of Broadway – Lafayette Street and feed into the BMT Nassau Street Line west of Essex Street. The purpose of this portion of the connector was to allow trains originating in northern and eastern Brooklyn and southern and eastern Queens to operate into Midtown Manhattan via the Sixth Avenue Line, rather than having to turn south along Nassau Street. The KK (later renamed the K) service, which used these tracks, proved unpopular; as such, it only operated from July 1, 1968, to August 29, 1976, when it was cut as part of an ongoing retrenchment of service during New York City's fiscal crisis.

The connection was used for a time to move equipment to and from the BMT Eastern Division, but was not used in regular service again until budget cuts forced a reroute of the M along the connection starting on June 27, 2010. The M had been rerouted to replace the discontinued V route on the IND Sixth Avenue Line and the IND Queens Boulevard Line to Forest Hills–71st Avenue.

== Development ==
=== Planning ===
A plan similar to the Chrystie Street Connection was proposed as part of the Second Avenue Subway (SAS) under the Board of Transportation's 1944–1948 Capital Program, with connections from the 2nd Avenue line to the BMT Nassau Street Line, the Williamsburg and Manhattan Bridges, as well as a new station at Grand and Chrystie Streets. This plan would have allowed service from Grand Street to run south to Chambers and Broad Streets on the BMT Nassau Street Line, providing an additional East River crossing via the Montague Street Tunnel.

The New York City Board of Estimate voted in September 1951 to construct the Second Avenue Subway and several related lines for $500 million. The next year, the New York City Board of Transportation (BOT) indicated that it would award contracts for the construction of an 890-foot-long (270 m) section of tunnel between Hester and Delancey Streets, including a station at Grand Street, as part of the SAS project. Work had been expected to begin in mid-1952 but was delayed because of engineering difficulties.

By 1954, the BOT's successor, the New York City Transit Authority, had asked the city for $37.3 million to begin constructing the Chrystie Street Connection. In 1955, the TA recommended that the Board of Estimate approve a contract to reconstruct a junction near the DeKalb Avenue station, on the Brooklyn side of the Manhattan Bridge, to eliminate a bottleneck there. This was the first step in a larger plan to improve transit service between Brooklyn and Manhattan. The Chrystie Street Connection would utilize the additional capacity created by reconstructing the tracks around DeKalb Avenue.

=== Construction ===
In mid-1957, the New York City government solicited bids from contractors to construct the various parts of the connection. That October, the Board of Estimate approved an initial $10.2 million for the connection. This initial funding would be used to construct the connection to the Williamsburg Bridge, as well as the section of the Manhattan Bridge connection from Delancey to Stanton Street. A groundbreaking ceremony was held on November 25, 1957, with Mayor Robert F. Wagner, Jr. and TA officials in attendance. The project was constructed in conjunction with the addition of express tracks on the Sixth Avenue Line between 34th Street and West 4th Street, adding capacity to the line. It was expected that the project would be finished in three years. Workers were constructing the segment of the Manhattan Street connection beneath the existing Nassau Street Line by 1959. Concrete workers went on strike while the connection was under construction, raising concerns that the BMT tunnel could be undermined; to prevent the tunnel from collapsing, the concrete workers' union made an exception allowing workers to pour concrete for the tunnel.

In 1962, the construction of an extension of the Sixth Avenue Line to a new terminal at 57th Street was announced. This would be the final major component of the plan to increase Brooklyn to Manhattan capacity. In February 1963, construction of the tunnel for the Chrystie Street Connection was 95 percent complete. It was expected that contracts for track work would be put out for bidding in about a month, after which contracts would be let for ventilation, drainage, lighting, and signals. In addition, the contract for the construction of an extension of the Sixth Avenue Line from 52nd Street to 58th Street for the new 57th Street terminal was expected to be put out for bidding in May. In August 1963, the project was expected to be completed in 1966. On January 23, 1964, the entire seven-block length of Chrystie Street was fully reopened to traffic. It had been subjected to different closures for six years for the construction of the line. Later that year, the tracks in the new connection were laid. In contrast to subway tracks on existing lines, which contained wooden cross ties, the new tracks were installed on rubber pads attached to the concrete track bed, thereby dampening noise from trains.

In 1965, the connection was projected to cost $100 million (equivalent to $1.021647307×10^{9} in 2025), and provide capacity for 52,000 additional riders per hour between Brooklyn and Manhattan. This included 14,000 additional riders on the BMT West End Line, 9,000 on the BMT Sea Beach Line, 17,000 on the BMT Brighton Line, and 12,000 on the BMT Fourth Avenue Line. By January of that year, lighting, power, and signal equipment had been installed on the connection. In June 1965, completion of the section including the Grand Street station was expected in 1966, with the entire project's completion planned for 1967. To allow the Sixth Avenue Line express tracks to be connected, from July 11 to August 30, 1966, F trains terminated at Second Avenue instead of at the center tracks at Broadway–Lafayette Street.

== Opening ==
The Manhattan Bridge connection and the Grand Street station opened on November 26, 1967, almost exactly 10 years after the project began. The Williamsburg Bridge connection and 57th Street station opened on July 1, 1968. The opening of the connection allowed greater flexibility in routings along BMT lines in Brooklyn. The Manhattan Bridge connection eliminated a bottleneck where trains using three of the four BMT Southern Division lines from Coney Island–Stillwell Avenue, were forced to use the Manhattan Bridge or the Montague Street Tunnel before going onto the BMT Broadway Line to Midtown Manhattan (or onto the Nassau Street Loop). The new connection thus permitted IND Sixth Avenue Line trains from Midtown to use the BMT lines toward Coney Island, while preserving Nassau Street service via the Montague Street Tunnel. Trains from the BMT Jamaica Line and other BMT Eastern Division lines also gained a direct connection to Midtown Manhattan via the Sixth Avenue Line by using the Williamsburg Bridge connection.

The Chrystie Street Connection was the first actual integration of BMT and IND lines after the unification of all major lines under New York City municipal ownership in 1940. Prior to that, the nearest integration of the two previous systems was the operation of BMT trains over part of the IND Queens Boulevard Line via the BMT 60th Street Tunnel Connection connecting Lexington Avenue/59th Street on the BMT Broadway Line to Queens Plaza on the IND Queens Boulevard Line in 1955. In that case, however, BMT trains operated on the IND by trackage rights, using BMT equipment and crews.

== Service changes ==
Two major service changes were inaugurated with the opening of the connection. The first went into effect on Sunday, November 26, 1967, when the Manhattan Bridge connection opened. The second occurred on Monday, July 1, 1968, when the Williamsburg Bridge connection opened. Additionally, for the 1967 opening, every service in the system was labeled with a letter or number and a color.

=== Original changes ===
==== Changes following the Manhattan Bridge connection opening ====
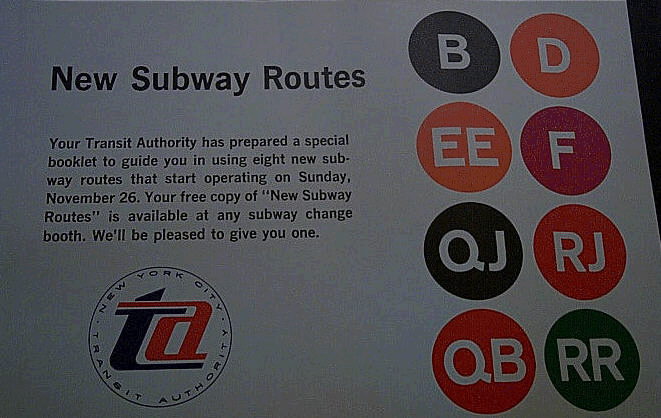
New Subway Routes

On November 15, 1967, the TA published a subway map showing which routes would be changed when the Manhattan Bridge connection opened. After 940 new signs had already been installed across the New York City Subway system, mayor John Lindsay wrote a letter to the TA in an attempt to delay the planned route changes. Lindsay dropped his objection on November 22, just hours before workers started installing heavy equipment to reroute the tracks. Two days later, a New York state judge dismissed a lawsuit against the route changes.

The opening of the Manhattan Bridge connection on November 26, 1967, was concurrent with the opening of the new express tracks on the Sixth Avenue Line between West Fourth Street–Washington Square and 34th Street, providing additional capacity for the extra trains on the IND via the connection. The following service changes were made, affecting about 200,000 passengers:

- The rush-hour only BB, which had run between Washington Heights–168th Street on the IND Eighth Avenue Line and 34th Street, was relabeled the B. It was extended via the new Sixth Avenue Line express tracks and the Chrystie Street Connection, then express on the BMT Fourth Avenue Line and local on the BMT West End Line, terminating at Coney Island–Stillwell Avenue. This latter segment replaced the T (express via Bridge) and TT (local via Tunnel) services, leaving only the TT West End Shuttle from the BMT Fourth Avenue Line running to Coney Island during late evenings, late nights and all day Sundays. B service was added during middays, early evenings, and the same time on Saturdays, but only south of West Fourth Street – Washington Square.
- The Q (BMT Brighton Line express) service was "absorbed" by a rerouted D, which used the Sixth Avenue Line local tracks (except rush hours, when it ran express). It used the Chrystie Street Connection to the BMT Brighton Line to Coney Island-Stillwell Avenue (running express in Brooklyn from morning rush hours through early evenings). Formerly, the Q had run local in Brooklyn (except during morning rush hours and early evenings) and express on the BMT Broadway Line in Manhattan, terminating at 57th Street. The pre-1967 Q ran only weekdays until the mid-evening. The D had previously used the Sixth Avenue Line and IND Culver Line to Coney Island; this service was replaced by the F (see below).
- The EE service was added, running weekday rush hours, middays and early evenings, as a local train between Forest Hills–71st Avenue on the IND Queens Boulevard Line and Whitehall Street–South Ferry on the Broadway Line via the BMT 60th Street Tunnel Connection and the Broadway Line in Manhattan. This replaced the RR, which had formerly used the 60th Street connection during the same times (and was cut back to 57th Street in Manhattan other times). The RR was rerouted to Astoria – Ditmars Boulevard full-time. The QT (Q via Tunnel) and QB (Q via Bridge) had served Astoria from the BMT Brighton Line; the QT was partly replaced with the QJ (Q via Jamaica; see below), and the QB was truncated to 57th Street for rush hour-only service. The D (see above) now served the Brighton Line.
- In a major rerouting affecting Queens riders, the F train was considerably extended from its original terminal stops, Broadway–Lafayette Street (morning rush hour to early evening) and 34th Street-Herald Square on the Sixth Avenue Line (other times), into Brooklyn to Stillwell Avenue along the Culver Line (previously serviced by the D). It continued to run express east of Forest Hills–71st Avenue only during rush hours. For the first time, riders from central Queens had a one-seat ride to southern Brooklyn destinations and Coney Island.
- The QJ was added as a rerouting of the old QT, combined with an extension of the old J Jamaica Express, entering Manhattan via the tunnel and extending via the BMT Jamaica Line to 168th Street. Its service hours remained the same, running from morning rush hours through early evening. It continued to run express in western Brooklyn and skip-stop in morning rush hours only in eastern Brooklyn.
- The RJ (R via Jamaica) service was added as an extension of former RR special service on the Nassau Street line, continuing local along the Jamaica Line to 168th Street. It operated only during rush hours.

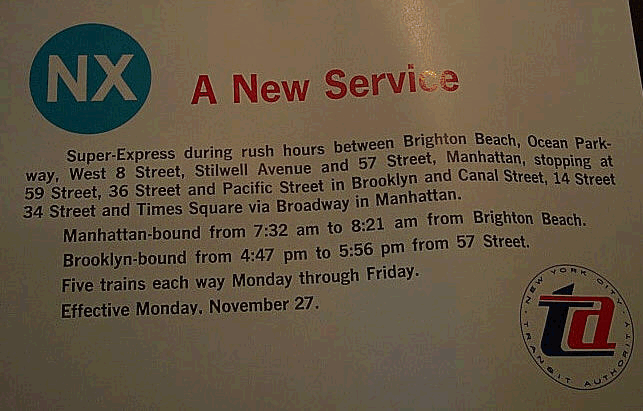
NX A New Service

- The NX was added for a "super-express" service from Brighton Beach through the Stillwell Avenue terminal (the only service to do so) and along the BMT Sea Beach Line's middle express tracks and Fourth Avenue Line to 57th Street in Manhattan.
- A free transfer was established between the Atlantic Avenue on the IRT Eastern Parkway Line and Atlantic Avenue on the BMT Brighton Line. While these two stations were both adjacent to the LIRR Atlantic Terminal and each other, their respective fare-control zones were separated at the time.

These changes were reportedly so confusing to some motormen that on November 28, 1967, a motorman intending to operate a train along the new D route via Grand Street accidentally took his train to Canal Street, necessitating the discharge of 800 passengers from the train during a busy rush hour. Reaction among passengers was mixed, with one passenger hugging a conductor after the opening of the new Grand Street station in Manhattan, while another passenger complained about having to take a slow local train in Brooklyn.

==== Changes following the Williamsburg Bridge connection opening ====
The following changes went into effect on July 1, 1968, concurrent with the opening of the 57th Street station at Sixth Avenue and the bridge connection:

- The KK service commenced between the new 57th Street station at Sixth Avenue and 168th Street in Jamaica. It operated only during rush hours, running skip-stop with the QJ on the BMT Jamaica Line east of Broadway Junction and then local into Manhattan. In Brooklyn, the KK (rush hours) and QJ (other times) replaced the JJ service, which was discontinued. The KK served "A" stops on the skip-stop portion of the BMT Jamaica Line, and the QJ served "B" stops. This skip-stop pattern, which had operated only in morning rush hours, was extended into afternoon rush hours, but still ran only in the peak direction.
- The B service was extended during non-rush hours from its former terminus at West Fourth Street–Washington Square to the new 57th Street station, using the local tracks of the IND Sixth Avenue Line. Rush hour trains continued on the established route to Washington Heights–168th Street via the express tracks (and the local tracks of the IND Eighth Avenue Line). The TT shuttle on the BMT West End Line in late evenings, late nights and all day Sunday, was discontinued and replaced by additional B service.
- The D service now bypassed 14th Street and 23rd Street via the express tracks of the IND Sixth Avenue Line at all times. It had previously done this only during rush hours. This service is taken over by the B and KK.
- The M (rush hour service) was extended from Chambers Street to Broad Street due to the additional capacity available from the rerouting of the JJ (as the KK).
- A free transfer was added between 42nd Street–Bryant Park on the IND Sixth Avenue Line and Fifth Avenue on the IRT Flushing Line from 5 AM to 10 PM weekdays. A passageway connecting the stations directly was built later on, and opened in 1972.

The following adjustments to the new service were put into effect on August 18, 1968:

- The D service was truncated to Brighton Beach when it ran express on the BMT Brighton Line (morning rush hours through early evenings). The QB (rush-hour peak direction only) and QJ (morning rush hours through early evenings) were extended from Brighton Beach to Coney Island–Stillwell Avenue.
- The F ran express on the IND Culver Line during rush hours north of Church Avenue. Several peak-direction rush hour trains were truncated to Kings Highway; the rest provide express service north of Kings Highway. The GG train was extended to Church Avenue during rush hours to replace F local service, but was cut back to Smith–Ninth Streets on January 18, 1976.

=== Later changes ===
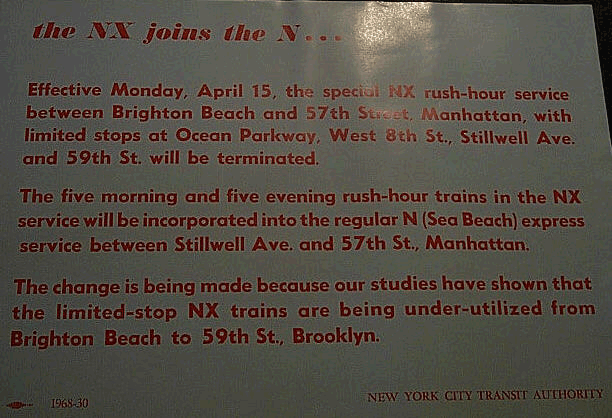
The NX joins the N

These new services began to unravel in response to commuter complaints about the various routings. Many of the new extensions like the NX and RJ quickly disappeared (April 12, 1968, and June 28, 1968, respectively), although the RJ was replaced with a shorter rush hour R service between Chambers Street and 95th Street-4th Avenue in Brooklyn. The KK (since renamed the K) was discontinued in 1976 as a money-saving measure, ending service via the Williamsburg Bridge connection. Reconstruction of the Manhattan Bridge occurred from 1986 to 1988, in 1995, and from 2001 to 2004. At times, this made the Chrystie Street Connection unavailable for through trains, and made the Grand Street station a terminal for Grand Street Shuttle service to Broadway–Lafayette Street. The Manhattan Bridge reopened fully in 2004.

=== Current service routing ===
The Chrystie Street Connection returned to full revenue service on June 28, 2010. The Manhattan Bridge connection continues to be used by the B and D services. The Williamsburg Bridge connection is now used by the M, which had formerly traveled down the BMT Nassau Street Line. In June 2010, as part of a round of service cuts, the M was rerouted via Chrystie Street onto the IND Sixth Avenue Line, continuing along the discontinued V service's former routing north of Broadway–Lafayette Street.

== Proposed Second Avenue Subway connections ==
As a road, Chrystie Street extends northward beyond Houston Street to become Manhattan's Second Avenue, and the Chrystie Street Connection was the first part of the long-planned Second Avenue Subway to be opened to service. The connection is one of several vestiges of early efforts to build the Second Avenue Subway, and before the connection was built, the original IND construction for the line included a recession in the ceiling at Second Avenue station and a short tunnel under Bowery.

The Chrystie Street Connection comprises two of the six parts of the Second Avenue Subway that were built in the 1960s and 1970s—the other four parts being the BMT 63rd Street Line, two unused subway segments under Second Avenue in East Harlem (one of which was connected to the 63rd Street line for Phase 1 of the Second Avenue line, which opened in 2017), and an unused subway segment under Confucius Plaza just to the south. The Chrystie Street Connection would have facilitated cross-platform and track interchanges between the Second and Sixth Avenue lines at Grand Street. Under current plans, Phase 4 of the future Second Avenue Subway will be built below the existing Sixth Avenue tracks.

== Station listing ==
Station service legend
Stops all times	Stops 24 hours a day
Stops weekdays during the day	Stops during weekday daytime hours only
Time period details
Disabled access	Station is compliant with the Americans with Disabilities Act
↑	Station is compliant with the Americans with Disabilities Act in the indicated direction only
↓	Station is compliant with the Americans with Disabilities Act in the indicated direction only
	Elevator access to mezzanine only

Station	Services	Opened	Notes
Williamsburg Bridge Connection: begins as a split from the IND Sixth Avenue Line local tracks south of Broadway–Lafayette Street
(no stations)	M	November 26, 1967	unused in revenue service 1976–2010
Manhattan Bridge Connection: begins as a ramp from the IND Sixth Avenue Line express tracks south of Broadway–Lafayette Street
Grand Street	B D	November 26, 1967	unused in revenue service 1986-1988 and 2001-2004
