= Brooklyn and Queens Transit Corporation =

Former New York City street railway company

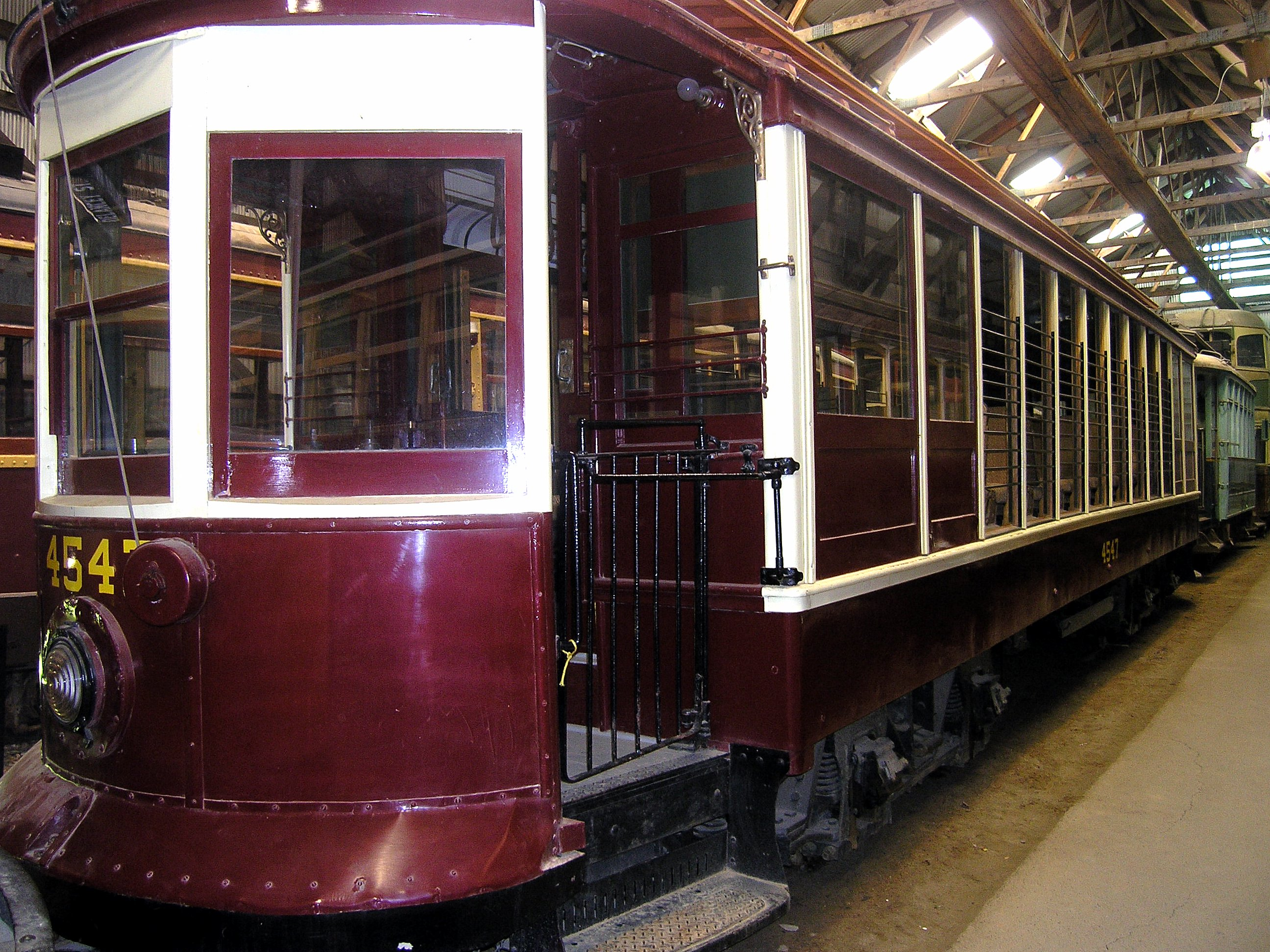
Former B&QT streetcar #4547 at the Seashore Trolley Museum

The Brooklyn and Queens Transit Corporation (B&QT) was a subsidiary of the Brooklyn–Manhattan Transit Corporation that operated streetcars in Brooklyn and Queens, New York City, United States (as well as into Manhattan via the Brooklyn Bridge and Williamsburg Bridge). It was created in 1929 to operate these routes, which had previously been operated by the BMT directly; its operations were transferred to the New York City Board of Transportation in 1940, and to the New York City Transit Authority in 1956.

== Preservation ==
A number of cars from the B&QT and its predecessor companies have been preserved. Several are in the Branford Electric Railway Historic District and one is at the Trolley Museum of New York.

== See also ==
- List of streetcar lines in Brooklyn
- List of streetcar lines in Queens
