= Brooklyn–Manhattan Transit Corporation =

Defunct transit operator in New York City

BMT

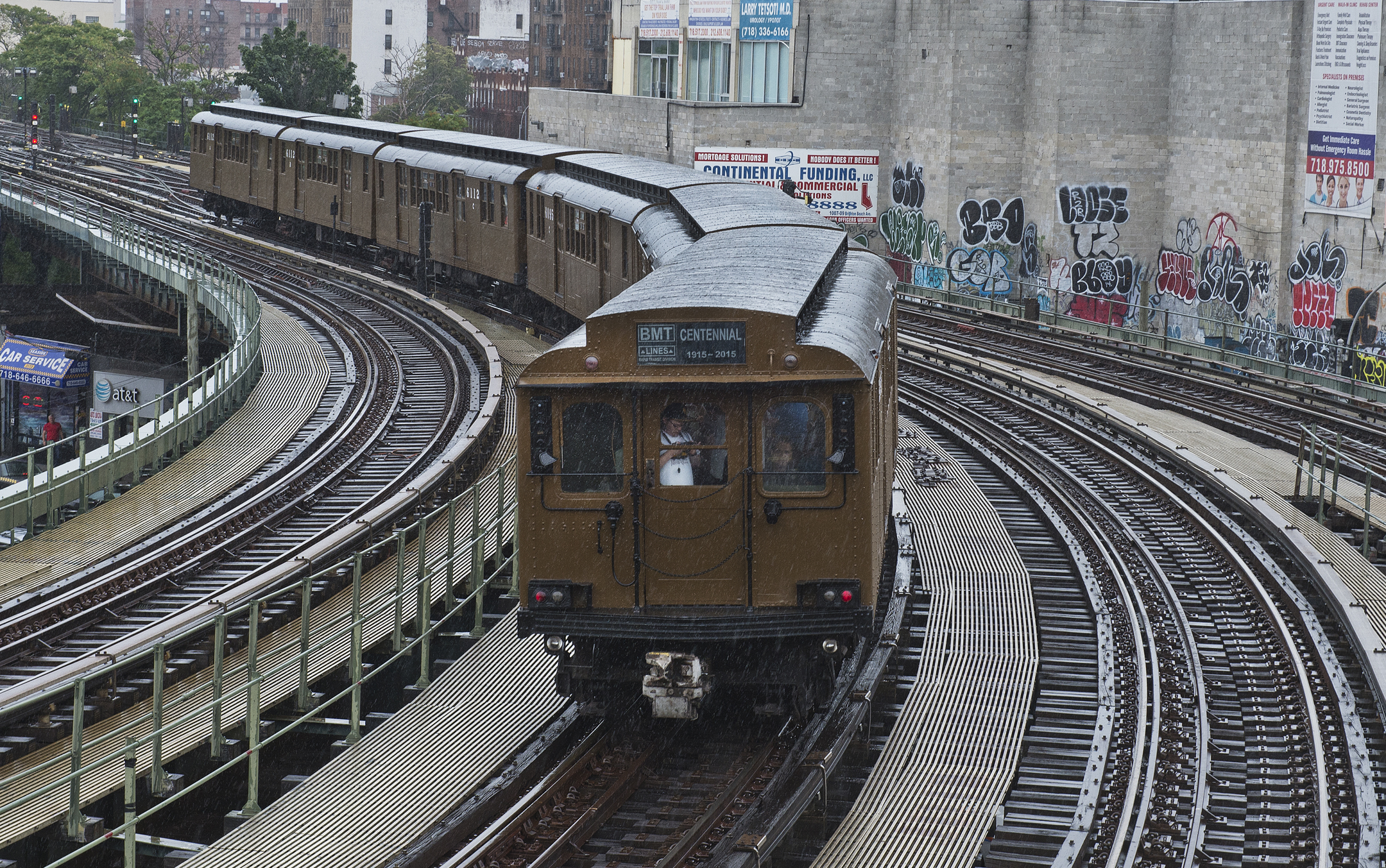
- A New York Transit Museum set of BMT Triplexes on the BMT Brighton Line

Overview
- Status: Incorporated into the New York City Subway
- Owner: City of New York

Service
- Operator: New York City Transit Authority
- Depot(s): Coney Island Yard, East New York Yard
- Rolling stock: R46, R68, R68A, R143, R160, R179, R211

History
- Opened: 1923; 103 years ago
- Closed: 1940; 86 years ago (acquisition by the NYC Board of Transportation)

Technical
- Track gauge: 4 ft 8 1/2 in (1,435 mm) standard gauge
Route map
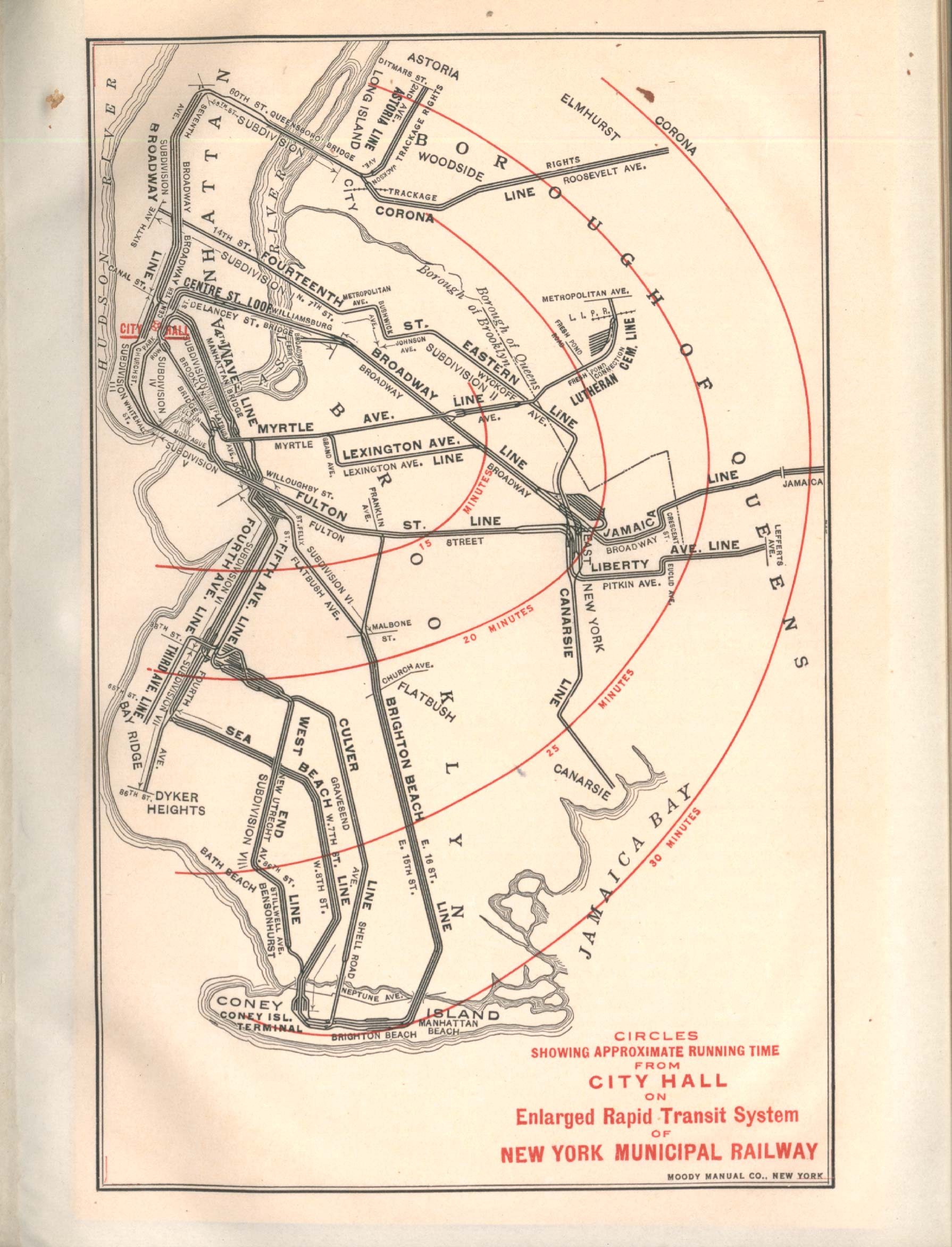
A 1914 map showing what was at the time the proposed expansion for the BRT. The only major differences from what was built is that a new 60th Street Tunnel was used rather than the Queensboro Bridge, the Manhattan-side Brooklyn Bridge connection was never built, and several lines ended up with fewer tracks than shown.

The Brooklyn–Manhattan Transit Corporation (BMT) was an urban transit holding company, based in Brooklyn, New York City, United States, and incorporated in 1923. The system was sold to the city in 1940. Today, together with the IND subway system, it forms the B Division of the modern New York City Subway.

The original BMT routes form the J/Z, L, M, N, Q, R and W trains, as well as the Franklin Avenue Shuttle, with the IND B and D using BMT trackage in Brooklyn. The M train enters the IND via the Chrystie Street Connection after crossing the Williamsburg Bridge. The Q, along with some rush-hour N trains enter the IND from the BMT 63rd Street Line. The R train enters the IND via the 60th Street Tunnel Connection.

The Z train supplements the J in the peak direction during rush hours only. Prior to city ownership, the BMT services were designed with numbers, and the current letter scheme was developed as a continuation of the IND nomenclature as the IND and BMT systems were integrated.

== History ==
The Brooklyn streetcar network

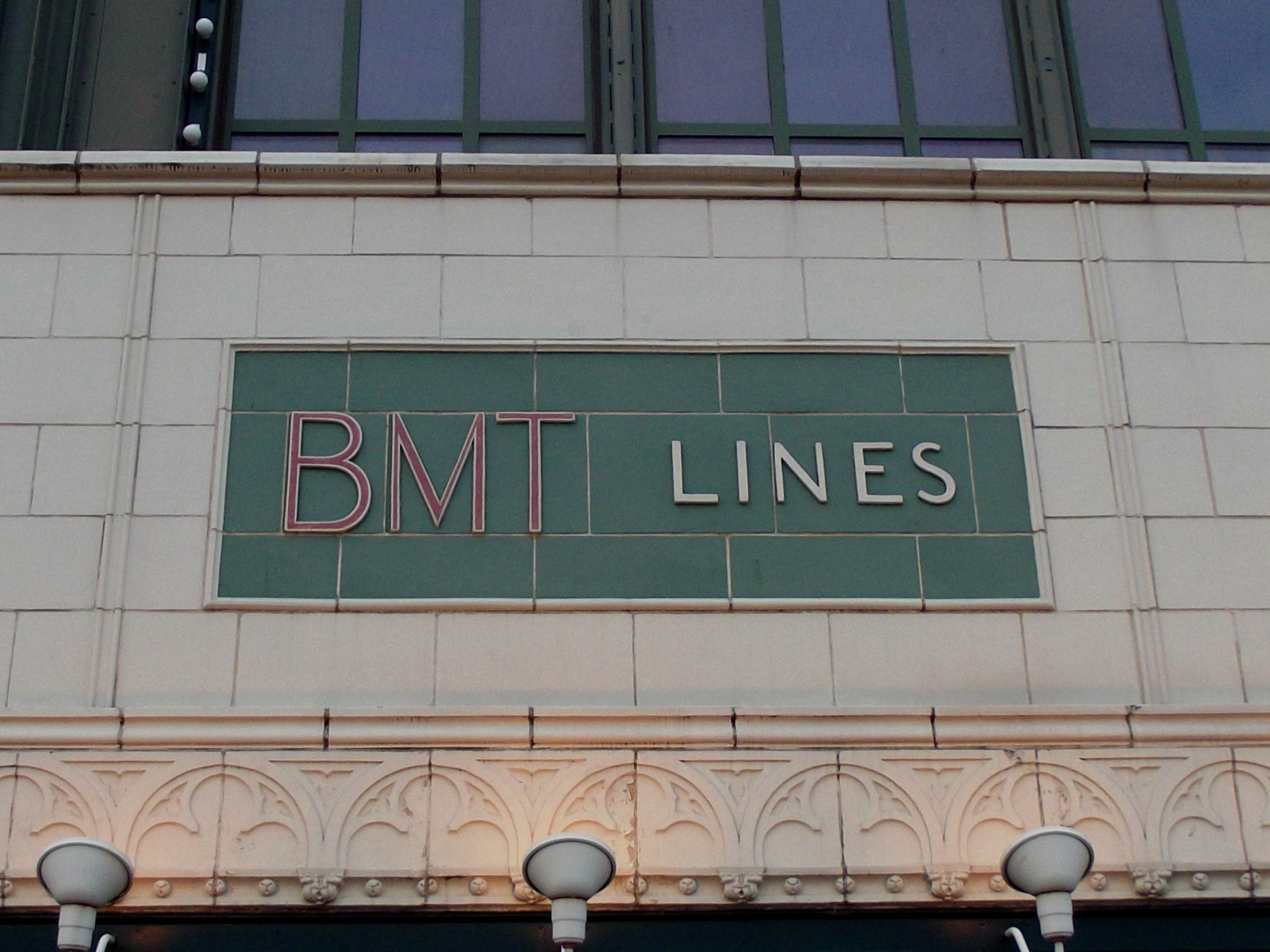
The Coney Island station entrance

=== Company years ===
The Brooklyn–Manhattan Transit Corporation took over the assets of the Brooklyn Rapid Transit Company on June 15, 1923, following the previous company's bankruptcy. Like its predecessor, it controlled subsidiaries which operated the great majority of the rapid transit and streetcar lines in Brooklyn with extensions into Queens and Manhattan. One of these, New York Rapid Transit Corporation operated the elevated and subway lines.

In 1923, their president, Gerhard Melvin Dahl, published a document called "Transit Truths" to explain the issues the company faced. In it, he complained that the company had "met with the bitter, personal and unfair opposition of Mayor Hylan." In a separate letter to Hylan he said: "For seven years, you have been misleading and fooling the people in this community… For seven years, you have blocked every effort at transit relief. You, and only you, are to blame for the present…deplorable condition of the whole transit situation. You have used the transit situation as a political escalator".

In the late 1930s, the BMT was pressed by the City administration of Mayor Fiorello H. La Guardia to sell its operations to the City, which wanted to have all subway and elevated lines municipally owned and operated. The City had two powerful incentives to coerce the sale:

- the BMT was forced by provisions of the Dual Contracts to charge no more than a five-cent fare, an amount set in 1913, before the inflation of World War I.
- the City had the right of "recapture" of those lines that had been built or improved with City participation under those Dual Contracts. This meant that, if the City forced the issue, the BMT could have been left with a fragmented system and City competition in many of its market areas.

The BMT sold all of its transit operations to the City on June 1, 1940.

=== Afterward ===
After World War II, the city-built IND subway took over parts of the former BMT, starting in 1954 with the extension of the D train from its terminal at Church Avenue via a new connection with the former BMT Culver line at Ditmas Avenue. From 1954, the three remaining Culver stations between Ninth Avenue and Ditmas Avenue were used by the Culver Shuttle. The service was discontinued in 1975 because of budget cuts and was later demolished.

The 60th Street Tunnel Connection between the IND Queens Boulevard Line and BMT Broadway Line opened in December 1955. This new route was used by the BMT Brighton local, which formerly ran to Astoria, for service to Forest Hills along with the IND GG local. The next year saw the new extension of the IND Fulton Street Line (A train) in Brooklyn connected to the rebuilt section of the former BMT Fulton Street elevated at 80th Street in Queens in April 1956. The portion of the BMT Fulton Street El running west of 80th Street to Rockaway Avenue was demolished afterwards.

The late 1950s and early 1960s saw the biggest project of that era with the building of the Chrystie Street Connection, and the IND Sixth Avenue express tracks. This project connected the IND Sixth Avenue services to the BMT services that ran over the Manhattan and Williamsburg Bridges. Express services were directly connected to the Manhattan Bridge, and local services could use either the Williamsburg Bridge or the existing Rutgers Street Tunnel. Both connections opened in November 1967 and created the largest re-routing of train services in the history of the NYCTA. The BMT West End and Brighton Lines became served primarily by IND services as a result. From 1967, some IND Sixth Avenue trains called KK and later K, used the Chrystie Street Connection to the BMT Jamaica Line over the Williamsburg Bridge. That connection was discontinued due to budget cuts in 1976.

In 1988, the BMT Archer Avenue Line was opened, connecting to what was then the east end of the BMT Jamaica Line. Two stations — Sutphin Boulevard–Archer Avenue–JFK Airport and Jamaica Center–Parsons/Archer — were added.

In 1989, the BMT 63rd Street Line opened as an extension of the express tracks of the BMT Broadway Line, connecting to the IND 63rd Street Line at Lexington Avenue–63rd Street station. A connection from the Broadway/63rd Street Lines to the IND Second Avenue Line opened in 2017.

In June 2010, as a result of more budget cuts, the Chrystie Street Connection was put back into revenue service for use by the M train, which was rerouted up the IND Sixth Avenue Line to replace the discontinued V train.

== Operation ==
The BMT operated rapid transit (subway and elevated lines) through the New York Rapid Transit Corporation and surface transit (streetcars and buses) through the Brooklyn and Queens Transit Corporation.

The BMT was a national leader in the transit industry, and was a proponent of advanced urban railways, participating in development of advanced streetcar designs, including the PCC car, whose design and advanced components influenced railcar design worldwide for decades. The company also sought to extend the art of rapid transit car design with such innovations as articulated (multi-jointed-body) cars, lightweight equipment, advanced control systems, and shared components with streetcar fleets.

Unlike the Interborough Rapid Transit Company (IRT), the other private operator of subways in New York City, the BMT remained solvent throughout the Great Depression and showed a profit, albeit small in its last year, until the very end of its transit operations.

== Surviving BMT Equipment ==
Several pre-unification BMT equipment have been preserved in various museums. While some of the equipment are operational, others are in need of restoration or are used simply as static displays.

- BU cars 197, 659, 1227, 1273, 1349, 1362, 1365, 1404 and 1407 have been preserved. Cars 197, 659, 1227, 1349 and 1362 are located at the Shore Line Trolley Museum. Car 1365 is on static display at the St. Louis Museum of Transportation. Cars 1273, 1404 and 1407 are operational at the New York Transit Museum.
- BMT Elevated Instruction car 999 is preserved at the Shore Line Trolley Museum.
- Q-type cars 1602A and 1612C have been preserved. Car 1602A survives at the Trolley Museum of New York, while car 1612C survives at the New York Transit Museum.
- AB Standards 2204, 2390, 2391, 2392 and 2775 have been preserved. Car 2204 is located at the New York Transit Museum; cars 2390, 2391 and 2392 are preserved by the Railway Preservation Corp; and car 2775 is preserved at the Shore Line Trolley Museum.
- D-type Triplex sets 6019, 6095, and 6112 have been preserved by the New York Transit Museum.
