= Shore Line Trolley Museum =

Transit museum in East Haven, Connecticut

- Location: 17 River Street; East Haven, Connecticut
- Type: Trolley History
- Website: shorelinetrolley.org
- Branford Electric Railway Historic District
- U.S. National Register of Historic Places
- U.S. Historic district
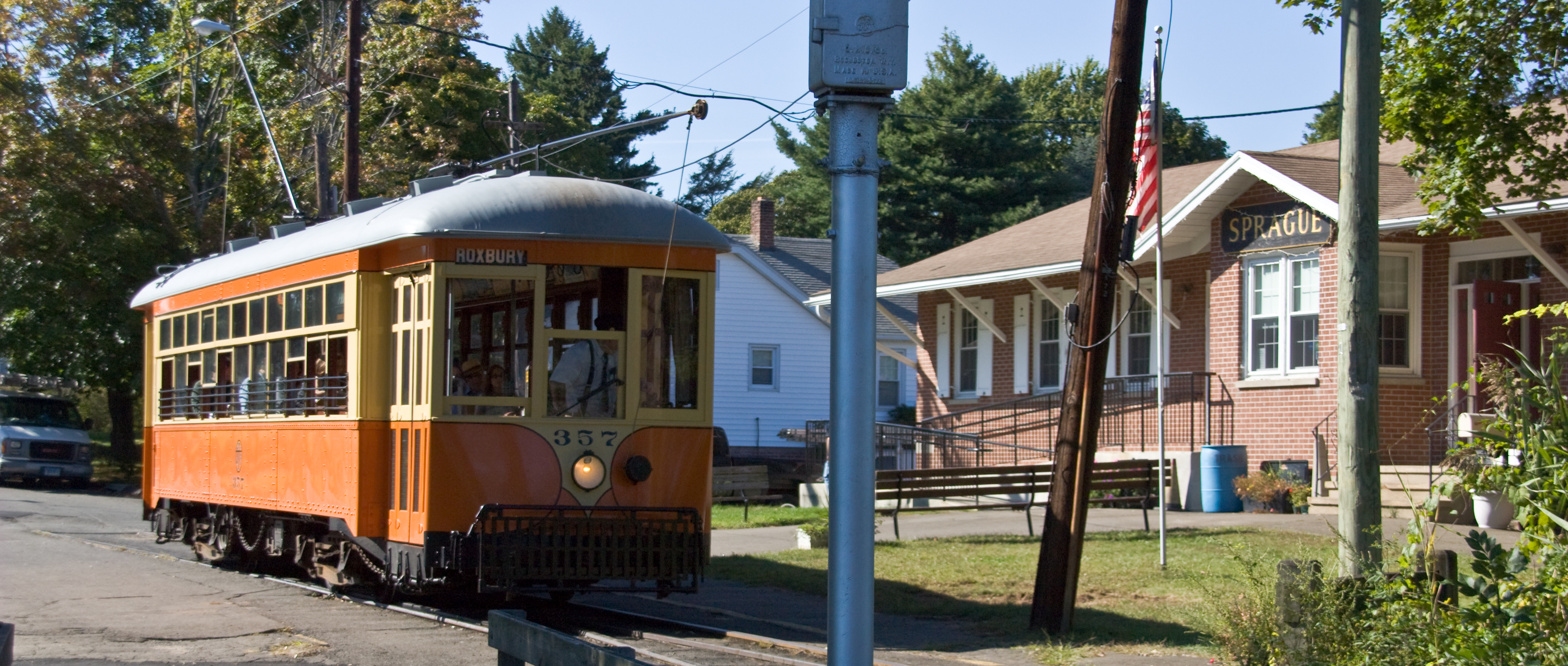
- Main building on River Street

- Location within Connecticut Location within the United States
- Location: East Haven, Connecticut
- Coordinates: 41°16′27.6″N 72°51′46.0″W
- Built: 1900
- NRHP reference No.: 83001278
- Added to NRHP: June 3, 1983

The Shore Line Trolley Museum is a trolley museum located in East Haven, Connecticut. Incorporated in 1945, it is the oldest continuously operating trolley museum in the United States. The museum includes exhibits on trolley history in the visitors' center and offers rides on restored trolleys along its 1.5 mi (2.4 km) track as the Branford Electric Railway. In addition to trolleys, the museum also operates restored subway cars, a small number of both trolleybuses and conventional buses.

The museum encompasses the Branford Electric Railway Historic District, which was added to the U.S. National Register of Historic Places in 1983.

== History ==
The museum was incorporated on August 13, 1945, as the nonprofit Branford Electric Railway Association (BERA), dedicated to both the preservation of streetcars and the opening and operation of a museum railroad. The BERA was founded by three members: Malcom G. Greenaway, a teacher at the Bulkeley School who served as president between 1947 and 1948, Charles F Munger, Jr, a bank teller who served as treasurer, and Wadsworth G. Filer of Simsbury. Its first streetcar was donated by the Five Mile Beach Electric Railway in New Jersey. The Connecticut Company (or ConnCo), which operated most of the streetcar lines in the state of Connecticut, had been making plans since the early 1930s to abandon its "F" route, cutting it back in stages from its long-time terminus of Stony Creek until by April 1946 it ended in front of the post office in Short Beach, its original terminus when the line was opened for service on 31 July 1900.

Ahead of the Connecticut Company's impending replacement of its remaining streetcar operations with buses, the BERA formed an agreement to purchase up to 14 of the company's streetcars then operating on routes in New Haven. The BERA assumed ownership and operation of the approximately 1.25 mi (2.01 km) line from East Haven to Short Beach on March 9, 1947, after the Connecticut Company ran its final streetcars on March 8. The association claimed approximately 150 members when it began operations. On startup, the museum gained four streetcars provided by the Connecticut Company along with three cars donated by the IRT Third Avenue Line of New York City. As no storage facilities existed on the museum grounds yet, the Connecticut Company agreed to store the museum's equipment in their facilities until the museum was able to complete its own car barn. Greenaway described the need for the museum upon opening by stating "It won't be long before [streetcars] won't run anywhere".

The museum initially funded its activities through monthly membership fees of $1 and initiation fees for both members and directors. Once facilities were available, twelve streetcars were delivered directly to the museum via the Connecticut Company's connecting tracks before the final abandonment of commercial streetcar service. The Connecticut Company ended all remaining New Haven streetcar service in 1948.

The 1.5 mi (2.4 km) line started out as double track but one of the tracks was torn up and sold for scrap to raise money. Eventually 20-year bonds were issued by the museum and its fortunes improved.

By 1949, the BERA counted approximately 1,000 members and 35 preserved streetcars. 40 percent of the museum's collection was donated directly by streetcar operators for preservation in light of the widespread retirement of streetcars nationally at the time. An article by King Features Syndicate reported that BERA's ultimate goal was "to own one of each trolley type made, recondition them and have all running as well as they did the day they stopped to pick up first fares".

In 1957 a new visitor center, named for traction pioneer Frank Julian Sprague and known as Sprague Station, was built out of brick at the East Haven end of the line with help from funds donated by his widow.

Over the intervening years, BERA's collection has grown to become the third largest collection of electric railway equipment in North America, with a focus on equipment from Connecticut and New York City. It operates a variety of streetcars, rapid transit cars and work cars throughout the year. BERA currently does business as the Shore Line Trolley Museum which is run almost entirely by volunteers. Antique equipment is repaired and restored at the museum.

The museum, including its line and equipment, were added to the National Register of Historic Places in 1983 as the Branford Electric Railway Historic District.

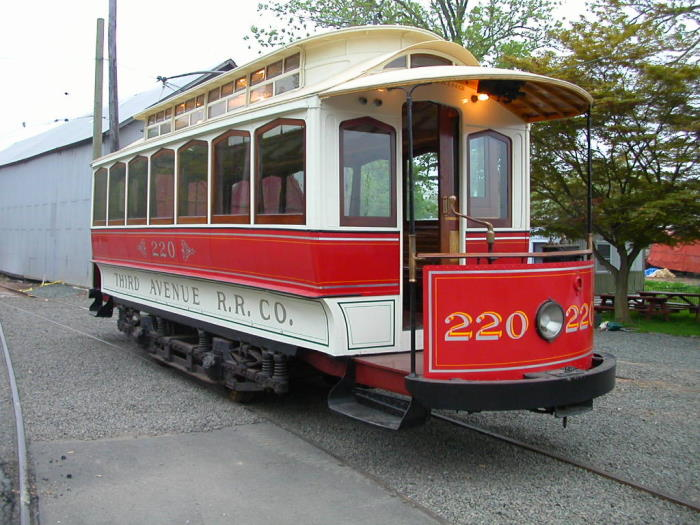
Third Avenue Railway System 220, the oldest operating streetcar in the United States

In August 2011, Hurricane Irene caused the worst flooding in the museum's history, with water up to 2 feet deep covering the grounds and almost 90 streetcars damaged. The damaged portion of the streetcar line returned to operation in May 2012, while repair of streetcars continued.

The collection also includes a small number of "trackless trolleys" (trolley buses) and motor buses (diesel- or gasoline-powered buses). In fall 2008, construction was started on a short trolley bus line, to allow the museum's trolley buses to operate. The line is a loop about 750 ft (230 m) long, with a branch into the maintenance and storage building. The first section was tested under power in April 2009 by 1947-built ACF-Brill trolley bus 205, which the museum acquired from the Philadelphia trolley bus system when it was retired from service by SEPTA in 1981. Construction of the line was about 70% completed by mid-2011, but was suspended when flooding from Hurricane Irene led to a change in priorities. Construction later resumed, and the trolley bus line was completed in 2017. Regular operation – proposed to take place about once a month – has not yet begun (as of 2023), because the vehicles need more work (such as painting) before they are considered ready for public rides. The Shore Line Museum also owns two other trolley buses: Ex-Massachusetts Bay Transportation Authority (Boston-area) 4037 is a 1976 Flyer E800 which the museum acquired in 2009 and which was able to operate at the museum at that time; it is not operational as of 2023 but is expected to become serviceable again eventually. The other trolley bus is ex-Philadelphia 210, which is identical to No. 205 (and was acquired at the same time) and is being used only as a source of parts.

== Highlights of the collection ==
- Horsecar 76, thought to be the oldest preserved horse-drawn tram in the world.
- New Orleans St. Charles Avenue Street car 850. It is one of the last three 800-series cars in existence. It was built by Perley Thomas in 1922.
- Connecticut Company 500, the luxurious business/parlor car used by ConnCo
- Manhattan Railway "G", the oldest preserved rapid transit car in the United States (built in 1878)
- Interborough Rapid Transit 3344 "Mineola," the personal private car of August Belmont, Jr. (president of the IRT, which operated New York's first subway)
- Ansonia Derby & Birmingham "Derby," the oldest surviving electric locomotive and the only Van De Poele motor preserved
- Brooklyn and Queens Transit 1001, the first production PCC streetcar built
- Third Avenue Railway System 220, the oldest operating streetcar in the United States (built in 1892)
- Hudson and Manhattan 503, the only restored H&M "black car"
- PATH PA3 745, Survived the collapse of the World Trade Center on 9/11
- NYCTA R17 6688, Used in filming for The Amazing Spider-Man 2
- IND R9 1689, one of the original R1-9 subway cars used by the Independent Subway System

== See also ==
- Connecticut Trolley Museum in East Windsor, Connecticut
- List of museums in Connecticut
- National Register of Historic Places listings in New Haven County, Connecticut
