= Laconia Car Company =

Rolling stock manufacturer

Laconia Car Company manufactured railway cars in Laconia, New Hampshire from 1848 to 1928.

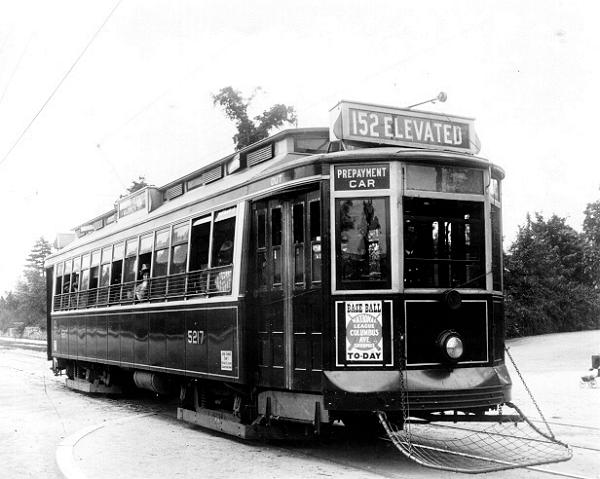
Boston Elevated Railway streetcar built by Laconia Car Company in 1911

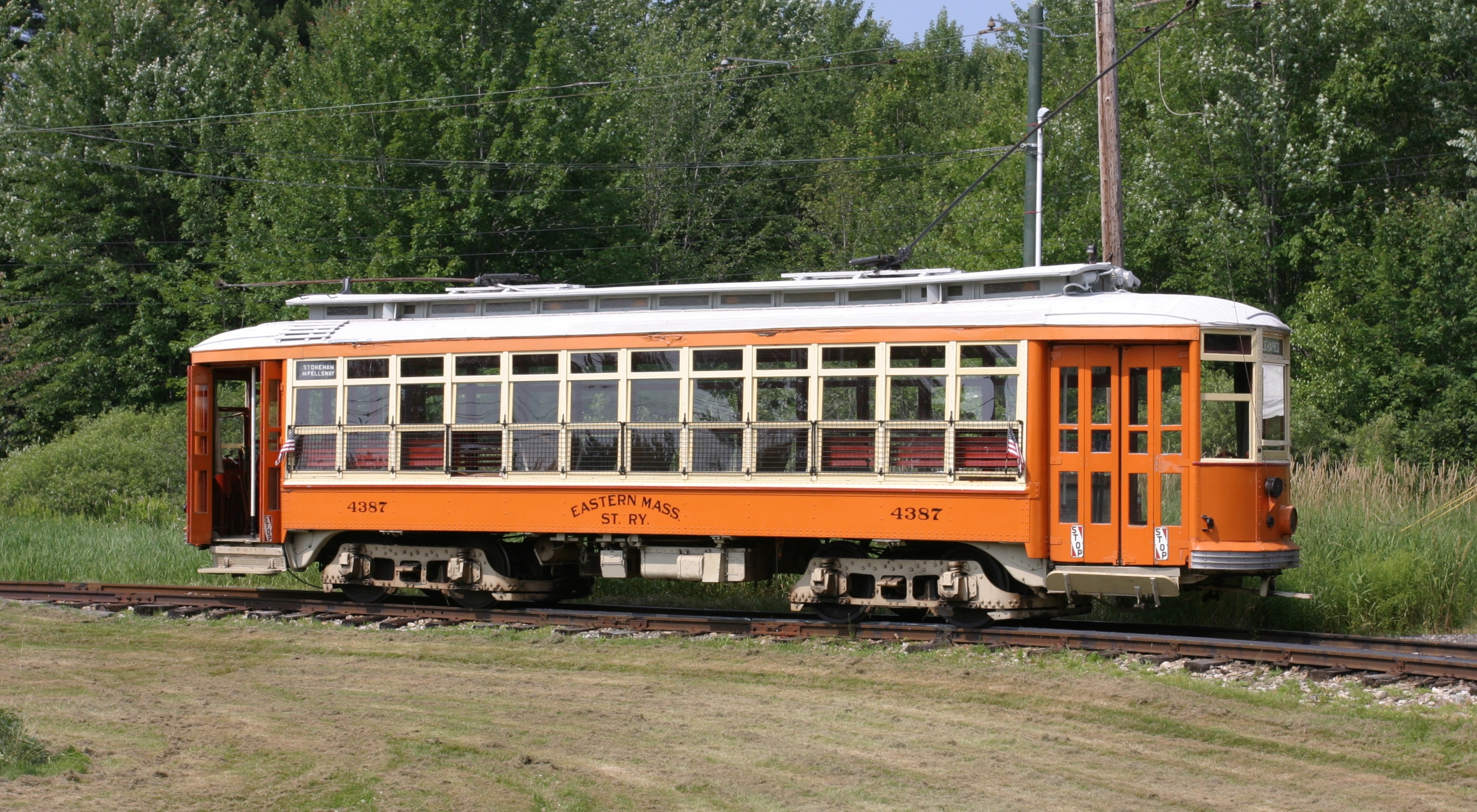
Laconia Car Company streetcar built in 1918 preserved at the Seashore Trolley Museum

The Ranlet Manufacturing Company began building horse-drawn wagons, carriages and stagecoaches in 1844. The company was identified as Ranlet Car Company to emphasize focus on manufacturing railway cars after railways reached Laconia in 1848. By 1869, the company employed one hundred men and was producing three hundred freight cars per year. In 1870 the company began producing railway passenger cars at the rate of about one per month.

== History ==
The company was reorganized as the Laconia Car Company in 1882, occupying seven acres of downtown Laconia including a four-story brick foundry for casting and forging metal parts. Some parts were used for wooden cars assembled in nearby shops, while other parts were sold to railways and other car manufacturers building or repairing wooden cars. Laconia was producing 125 railway passenger cars per year by 1893 primarily for New England railways, horsecar lines, and interurban electric lines. The foundry produced wheels, axles and trucks including a distinctive electric traction truck.

In 1889, Laconia finished a prototype steel railway car started in 1884 by a Boston shipbuilding firm under contract to the Steel Car Company. Wood remained Laconia's preferred building material, but steel underframes were used beginning in 1908. Laconia employed nearly five hundred men completing electric railway cars at the rate of one a day; and their products could be found operating as far away as the Los Angeles Railway. Employment increased to a thousand workers by 1912; but focus on electric railway cars made the company uncompetitive for conventional railway vehicles as electric railway riders began using automobiles, and 1914 was the last year of profitable operation for the company.

Production shifted to conventional baggage, mail and express cars; and a final order for ten cars was completed for the Boston Elevated Railway in 1923. Production shifted to plywood motorboats before the company closed in 1928.
