= Grand Street station (IRT Third Avenue Line) =

Former Manhattan Railway elevated station (closed 1955)

GRAND ST.
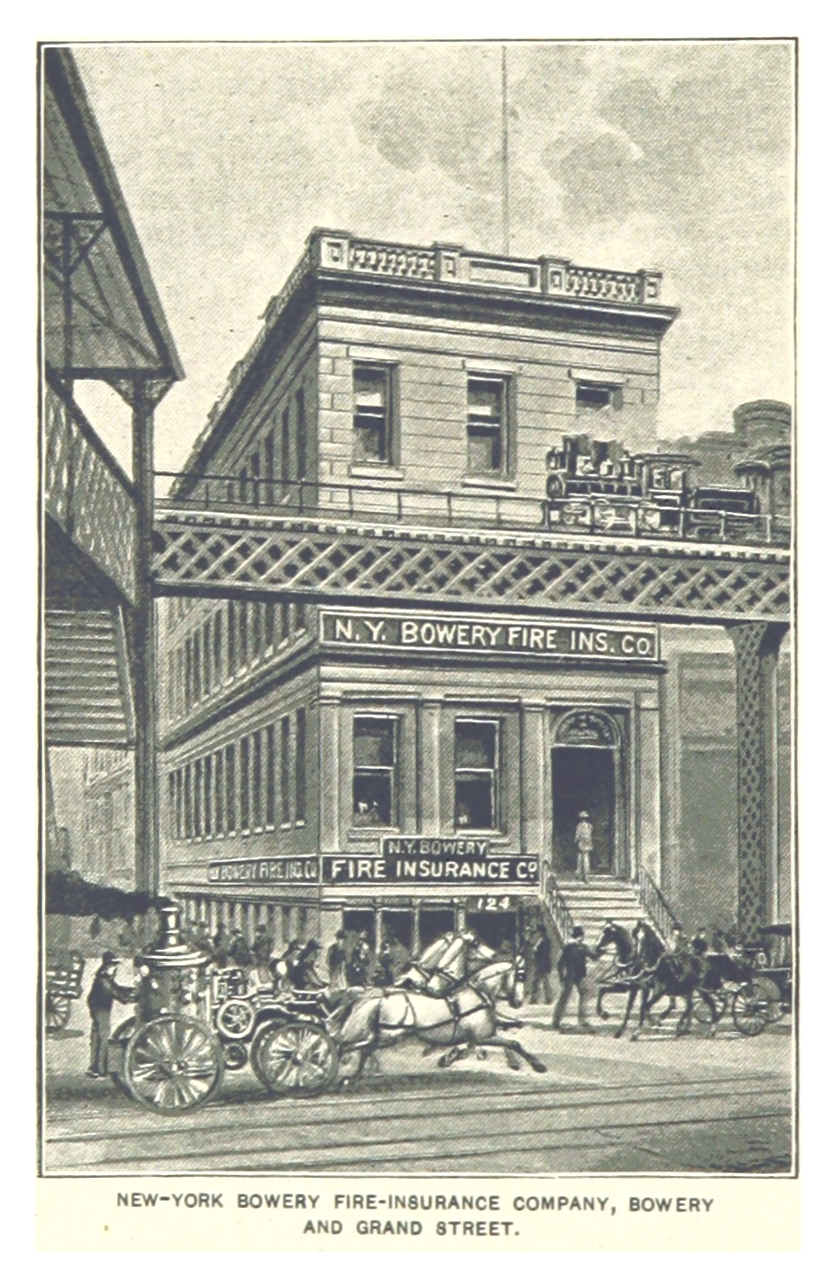

General information
- Location: Grand Street and Bowery; Lower Manhattan, Manhattan, New York
- Coordinates: 40°43′8.1″N 73°59′40.5″W
- System: Former Manhattan Railway elevated station
- Operator: Interborough Rapid Transit Company; City of New York (1940–1953); New York City Transit Authority
- Line: Third Avenue Line
- Platforms: 2 side platforms
- Tracks: 3

Construction
- Structure type: Elevated

History
- Opened: August 26, 1878; 148 years ago
- Closed: May 12, 1955; 71 years ago

Former services
Preceding station	Interborough Rapid Transit	Following station
Houston Street toward Bronx Park	Third Avenue Local-Express	Canal Street toward City Hall
Houston Street toward 129th Street	Third Avenue Local	Canal Street toward South Ferry
Location

The Grand Street station was a station on the demolished IRT Third Avenue Line in Manhattan, New York City over the Bowery. It had three tracks and two island platforms. This station closed on May 12, 1955, with the ending of all service on the Third Avenue El south of 149th Street.
