= 23rd Street station (IRT Third Avenue Line) =

Former Manhattan Railway elevated station (closed 1955)

23rd St.
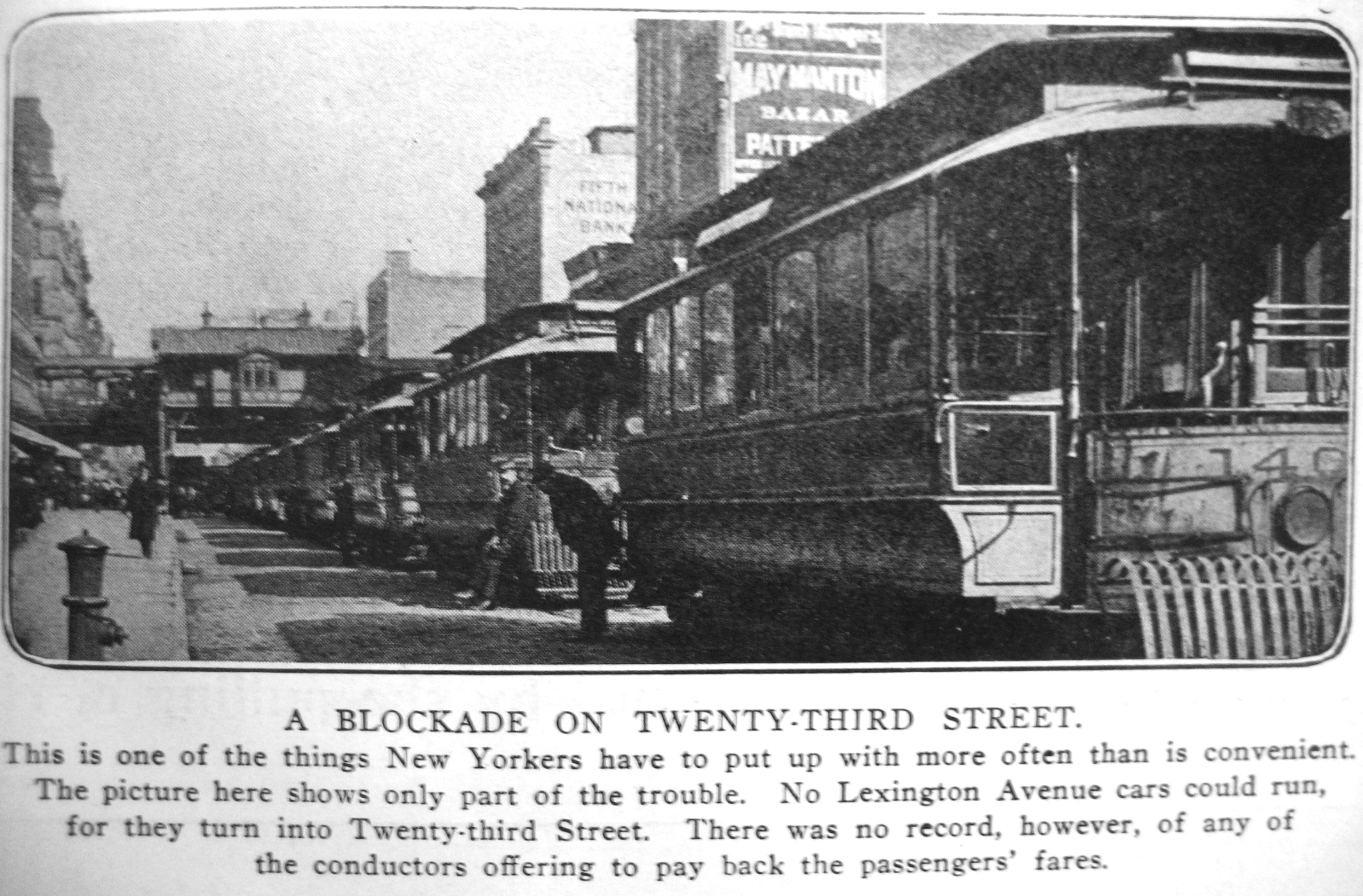
- A line of trolleys along 23rd Street with the Third Avenue Line station in the background in 1903.

General information
- Location: East 23rd Street and 3rd Avenue; Lower Manhattan, Manhattan, New York
- Coordinates: 40°44′19.6″N 73°58′59.4″W
- System: Former Manhattan Railway elevated station
- Operator: Interborough Rapid Transit Company (1903-1940); City of New York (1940–1953); New York City Transit Authority
- Line: Third Avenue Line
- Platforms: 4 side platforms (2 on each level)
- Tracks: 3 (1 – upper level) (2 – lower level)

Construction
- Structure type: Elevated

History
- Opened: August 26, 1878; 148 years ago
- Closed: May 12, 1955; 71 years ago

Former services
| Preceding station | Interborough Rapid Transit | Following station |
|---|---|---|
| 42nd Street toward Bronx Park | Third Avenue Local-Express | Ninth Street toward City Hall |
| 28th Street toward 129th Street | Third Avenue Local | 18th Street toward South Ferry |
Location

The 23rd Street station was an express station on the demolished IRT Third Avenue Line in Manhattan, New York City. It had two levels. The lower level was served by local trains and had two tracks and two side platforms. It was built first. The upper level was built as part of the Dual Contracts and had one track with two side platforms and served express trains. This station closed on May 12, 1955, with the ending of all service on the Third Avenue El south of 149th Street.
