= Ninth Street station (IRT Third Avenue Line) =

Former Manhattan Railway elevated station (closed 1955)

NINTH ST.
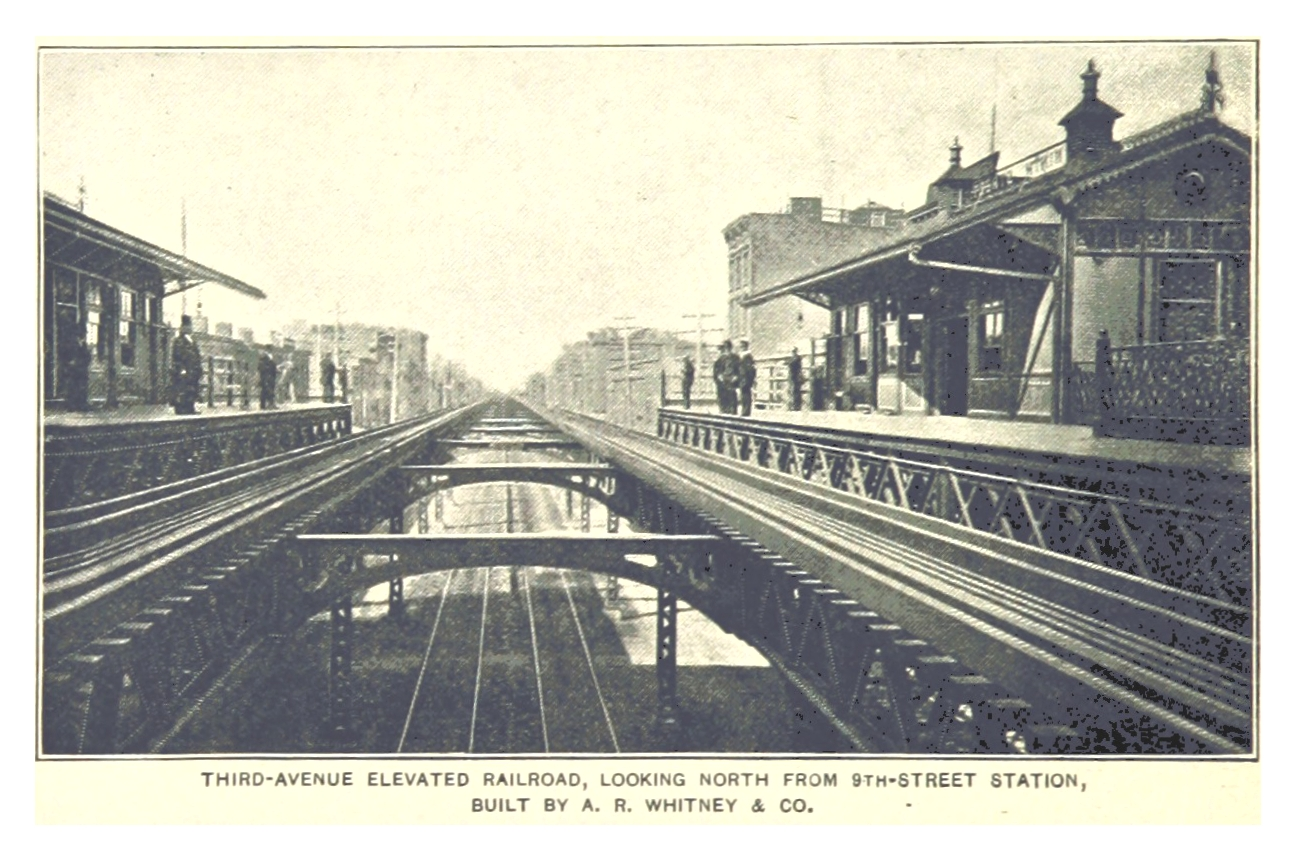
- Northbound view of Ninth Street station in 1893.

General information
- Location: East 9th Street and 3rd Avenue; Lower Manhattan, Manhattan, New York
- Coordinates: 40°43′48.1″N 73°59′22″W
- System: Former Manhattan Railway elevated station
- Operator: Interborough Rapid Transit Company; City of New York (1940–1953); New York City Transit Authority
- Line: Third Avenue Line
- Platforms: 4 side platforms (2 on both levels)
- Tracks: 3 (1 – upper level) (2 – lower level)

Construction
- Structure type: Elevated

History
- Opened: August 26, 1878; 148 years ago
- Closed: May 12, 1955; 71 years ago

Former services
Preceding station	Interborough Rapid Transit	Following station
23rd Street toward Bronx Park	Third Avenue Local-Express	Houston Street toward City Hall
14th Street toward 129th Street	Third Avenue Local	Houston Street toward South Ferry
Location

The Ninth Street station was an express station on the demolished IRT Third Avenue Line in Manhattan, New York City. It opened on August 26, 1878 and had two levels. The lower level was served by local trains and had two tracks and two side platforms. It was built first. The upper level was built as part of the Dual Contracts and had one track with two side platforms over the lower level local tracks which served express trains. This station closed on May 12, 1955, with the ending of all service on the Third Avenue El, south of 149th Street.
