= Houston Street station (IRT Third Avenue Line) =

Former Manhattan Railway elevated station (closed 1955)

HOUSTON ST.

General information
- Location: East Houston Street and Bowery; Lower Manhattan, Manhattan, New York
- Coordinates: 40°43′27″N 73°59′33.4″W
- System: Former Manhattan Railway elevated station
- Operator: Interborough Rapid Transit Company; City of New York (1940–1953); New York City Transit Authority
- Line: Third Avenue Line
- Platforms: 2 side platforms
- Tracks: 3

Construction
- Structure type: Elevated

History
- Opened: September 16, 1878; 148 years ago
- Closed: May 12, 1955; 71 years ago

Former services
Preceding station	Interborough Rapid Transit	Following station
Ninth Street toward Bronx Park	Third Avenue Local-Express	Grand Street toward City Hall
Ninth Street toward 129th Street	Third Avenue Local	Grand Street toward South Ferry
Location

The Houston Street station was a station on the demolished IRT Third Avenue Line in Manhattan, New York City on the Bowery. It opened on September 16, 1878, and had three tracks and two island platforms, which served all three tracks on one level. This station closed on May 12, 1955, with the ending of all service on the Third Avenue El south of 149th Street.
