= 14th Street station (IRT Second Avenue Line) =

Former Manhattan Railway elevated station (closed 1942)

14TH ST.

General information
- Location: East 14th Street and 1st Avenue; Midtown Manhattan, New York
- Coordinates: 40°43′52.77″N 73°58′57.36″W
- System: Former Manhattan Railway elevated station
- Operator: Interborough Rapid Transit Company; City of New York (after 1940)
- Line: Second Avenue Line
- Platforms: 4 side platforms (2 on each level)
- Tracks: 3 (2 – lower level) (1 – upper level)

Construction
- Structure type: Elevated

History
- Opened: March 1, 1880; 146 years ago
- Closed: June 13, 1942; 84 years ago

Former services
Preceding station	Interborough Rapid Transit	Following station
42nd Street toward Bronx Park	Second Avenue Express	Chatham Square toward City Hall
42nd Street toward Ditmars Boulevard	Second Avenue Queens	Chatham Square toward City Hall
19th Street toward 129th Street	Second Avenue Local	Eighth Street toward South Ferry
Location

The 14th Street station was an express station on the demolished IRT Second Avenue Line in Manhattan, New York City, located at the intersection of 14th Street and First Avenue. It had two levels. The lower level had three tracks and two side platforms and was served by local trains. The upper level had two tracks and two side platforms and was used by express trains. The next stop to the north was 19th Street for local trains and 42nd Street for express trains. The next stop to the south was Eighth Street for local trains and Chatham Square for express trains. The station closed on June 13, 1942.
