= MUDC (New York City Subway car) =

Retired class of Interborough Rapid Transit car

A MUDC train at 59th Street on the former IRT Third Avenue Line

The MUDC (Multiple-Unit Door Control) was a series of New York City Subway cars originally built by the St. Louis, Wason, Jewett, Cincinnati, and Barney and Smith companies, and rebuilt by the Interborough Rapid Transit Company in 1923–1924 from former Manhattan El gate cars.

== History ==
In 1923, the IRT selected 465 gate cars for the MUDC conversion program, which were inherited by the company upon acquisition of other elevated railway lines in Manhattan. The conversion was done with the intention of reducing the number of people required to operate the doors on the fleet, in addition to improving the safety of the passengers. The reconstructed cars have vestibuled platforms, with sliding doors in place of the old platform gates and railings. The sliding doors were made of sheet steel construction with two panels, one with glass and the other closed. The doors slide on the outside of the car. This construction had an advantage, as a pocket does not have to be provided inside, which would otherwise disturb the interior equipment. These rebuilt cars had the operator's controls installed on both ends of the car, and the operator controlled the doors in the middle of the train. The motorman's operating cab was in the same position, but received some minor upgrades.

Despite being a homemade conversion, the MUDCs presented a relatively fair appearance. The cars also proved to be extremely reliable for the crew and were the mainstay for the elevated lines. The first test train of MUDCs ran in 1923 on the IRT Second Avenue Line. They operated for many years until 1956, when all but the Bronx portion of the IRT Third Avenue Line was finally closed and demolished. None were preserved.

== Other usage of the MUDC name ==
The term MUDC was sometimes extended to refer to a series of Hi-V and Lo-V cars (the Gibbs Hi-Vs, Hedley Hi-Vs, and Flivver Lo-Vs) that were modified in the early 1920s for multiple unit door control operation. Under normal circumstances, however, the term was usually reserved for the gate cars that were converted for the said operation.
