= 14th Street station =

14th Street station may refer to:

- 14th Street station (PATH) at Sixth Avenue, Manhattan
- 14th Street–Union Square station, on the New York City Subway
- 14th Street/Sixth Avenue station, on the New York City Subway
- 14th Street/Eighth Avenue station, on the New York City Subway
- 14th Street station (IRT Second Avenue Line), on the Manhattan Railway 1880–1942
- 14th Street station (IRT Third Avenue Line), on the Manhattan Railway 1878–1955
- 14th Street station (IRT Sixth Avenue Line), on the Manhattan Railway 1878–1938
- 14th Street station (IRT Ninth Avenue Line), on the Manhattan Railway 1873–1940
