= 14th Street (Manhattan) =

West-east street in Manhattan, New York

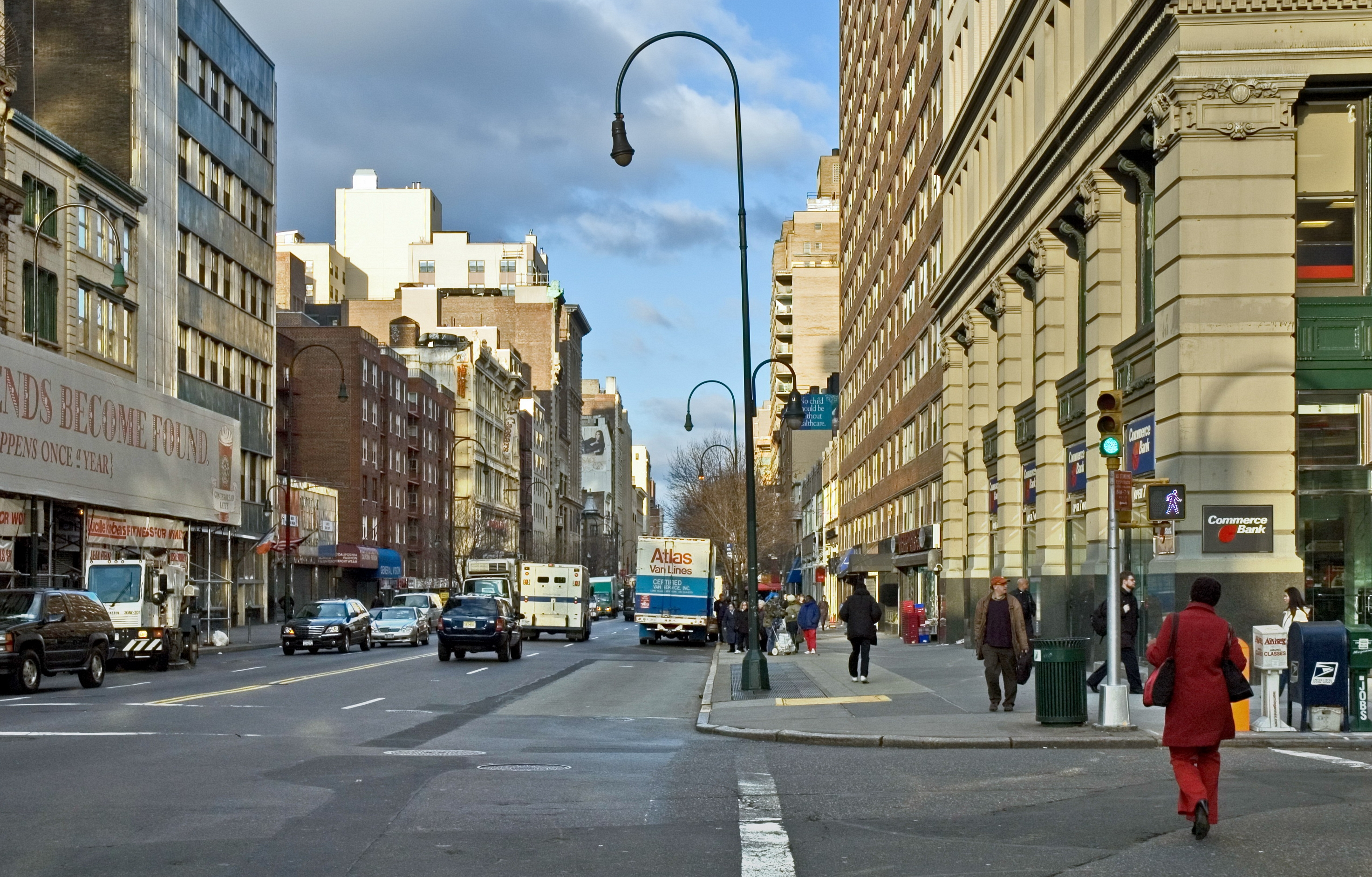
- 14th Street looking as seen from the east at Fifth Avenue
- Maintained by: NYCDOT
- Length: 2.0 mi (3.2 km)
- Location: Manhattan, New York City
- Postal code: 10014, 10011, 10003, 10009
- Coordinates: 40.7357°N 73.9929°W
- West end: NY 9A (11th Avenue) in Chelsea / Meatpacking
- East end: Avenue C in East Village / Stuyvesant Town
- North: 15th Street
- South: 13th Street

Construction
- Commissioned: March 1811

14th Street is a major crosstown street in the New York City borough of Manhattan, traveling between Eleventh Avenue on Manhattan's West Side and Avenue C on Manhattan's East Side. It forms a boundary between several neighborhoods and is the border between Lower Manhattan and Midtown Manhattan.

At Broadway, 14th Street forms the southern boundary of Union Square. It is also considered the southern boundary of Chelsea, Flatiron/Lower Midtown, and Gramercy, and the northern boundary of Greenwich Village, Alphabet City, and the East Village. West of Third Avenue, 14th Street marks the southern terminus of western Manhattan's grid system. North of 14th Street, the streets make up a near-perfect grid that runs in numerical order. South of 14th, the grid continues in the East Village almost perfectly, except in Greenwich Village, where an older and less uniform grid plan applies.

In the early history of New York City, 14th Street was an upscale location. However, it lost its glamour and status as the city grew northward and today it is primarily zoned as a commercial street. In October 2019, a busway restriction was put in place between Third and Ninth Avenues, prohibiting most types of vehicles during the daytime.

== History ==
The street was designated in the Commissioners' Plan of 1811 as the southernmost of 15 east–west streets that would be 100 feet (30 m) in width (while other streets were designated as 60 feet (18 m) wide). Roughly at the midpoint of 14th Street was Union Square, which opened in 1839. During the mid-19th century, residential and commercial development in Manhattan began to migrate uptown along Broadway, reaching 14th Street by the 1850s. In conjunction with this, several hotels, theaters, and stores were built along the central portion of 14th Street, including Steinway Hall and the Academy of Music. By the late 19th century, there were numerous piano showrooms around 14th Street. Many large retailers opened stores around the street, including Macy's, Siegel-Cooper, and Ohrbach's, while other retailers such as Tiffany & Co., Lord & Taylor, Arnold Constable & Company, and B. Altman and Company were located a few blocks away.

In the early 20th century, Tammany Hall, the Academy of Music, and numerous vaudeville theaters were clustered around New York City. One source referred to the center portion of 14th Street as "the Mecca of New York shoppers, and Sixth Avenue was the liveliest part of it". As development continued to move further north, most of the major retailers on 14th Street relocated northward in the 1920s. Lower-end stores began opening along the street, including many stores that sold women's clothing. The WPA Guide to New York City described 14th Street in 1939 as "perhaps the city's largest outlet for low-priced women's merchandise".

By the 1970s, J.W. Mays and S. Klein were the only major retailers remaining on 14th Street, and the street was lined with independent retailers and discount stores. There were only a few traces of 14th Street's heyday as a commercial center, including Lüchow's restaurant and Union Square Park. The New York City Department of Transportation (NYCDOT) began to reconstruct the entirety of 14th Street in 1990, replacing the roadway, sidewalks, and water and sewer pipes. As part of the project, the NYCDOT planted trees, installed new "bishop's-crook" streetlights, and added new gray sidewalks that were intended to resemble old granite sidewalks. By the 2000s, many residential buildings and shops were clustered around 14th Street, and technology companies had relocated to the street. The western end of the street, near the Meatpacking District, contained numerous nightclubs, restaurants, and art galleries. Dotcom companies, advertisers, designers, publishers, and photographers were clustered around 14th Street between Eighth and Fifth Avenue.

In June 2025, the roadbed of 14th Street between Ninth and Tenth Avenues was narrowed to make way for a pedestrian plaza. The width of the travel lanes was decreased to 18 feet (5.5 m), with curbs and planters being installed on either side. The next month, the city government announced a public–private partnership to study traffic flow and possible upgrades to the busway and pedestrian space, allocating $3 million to the study. The partnership included the DOT, the Metropolitan Transportation Authority, local community boards and business improvement districts, and various politicians. The following year, the DOT announced plans for permanent modifications to the 14th Street busway, including bike lanes and pedestrian plazas.

== Description ==
West 14th Street begins at an interchange with New York State Route 9A northeast of Greenwich Village. At the end of the interchange, it intersects with 10th Avenue. The street continues east, intersecting with Washington Street, Ninth Avenue/Hudson Street, Eighth Avenue, Seventh Avenue, Sixth Avenue, and Fifth Avenue. After Fifth Avenue, West 14th Street becomes East 14th Street and goes on to form the southern border of Union Square between University Place and Fourth Avenue. East of Fourth Avenue, 14th Street forms the southern end of Irving Place, a north–south road that terminates at Gramercy Park. 14th Street then intersects with Third Avenue, which forms the border between the neighborhoods of the East Village to the south and Gramercy to the north. The street goes on to intersect with Second Avenue. At First Avenue, 14th Street widens from a four-lane road to a six-lane divided boulevard with a westbound service road. It then intersects with the main thoroughfares of Alphabet City: Avenue A, Avenue B, and Avenue C, where the street terminates. It formerly terminated at FDR Drive via an on-ramp to the southbound FDR before the September 11 attacks, when the New York Police Department vacated the portion between Avenue C and FDR due to the presence of the nearby ConEdison East River Generating Station along 14th and 15th Streets as a possible terrorist target.

Since October 2019, vehicle restrictions are in place on 14th Street between Third and Ninth Avenues from 6 a.m. to 10 p.m. The only vehicles that can use the busway are buses, trucks making deliveries on 14th Street, emergency and Access-A-Ride vehicles, and local traffic traveling for no more than one block.

== Public transportation ==
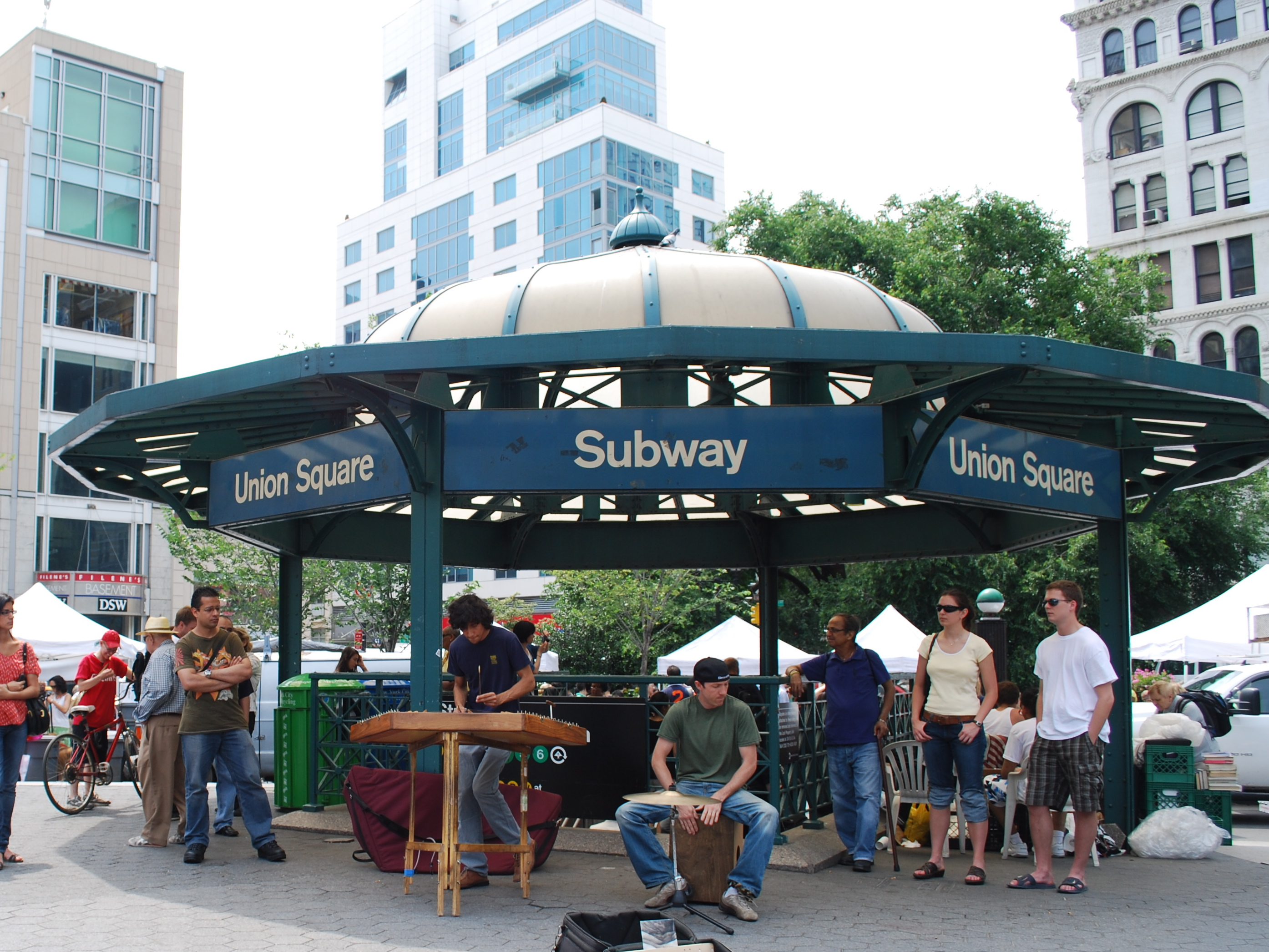
14th Street–Union Square station

14th Street is well served by the New York City Subway. The BMT Canarsie Line (L train) runs underneath 14th Street from Eighth Avenue to the East River, stopping at Eighth Avenue, Sixth Avenue, Union Square, Third Avenue, and First Avenue. Additionally, every subway route that crosses 14th Street has a stop there, except for the B and D trains:

- 14th Street–Union Square station on the BMT Canarsie Line, BMT Broadway Line, and IRT Lexington Avenue Line serving the 4, 5, 6, <6>, L, N, Q, R, and W trains
- 14th Street/Sixth Avenue on the IRT Broadway–Seventh Avenue Line, BMT Canarsie Line, and IND Sixth Avenue Line serving the 1, 2, 3, F and <F>, L, and M trains
- 14th Street–Eighth Avenue on the BMT Canarsie Line and IND Eighth Avenue Line serving the A, C, E, and L trains

A station at Second Avenue and 14th Street is planned as part of Phase 3 of the Second Avenue Subway, which is currently unfunded.

PATH also makes a stop at 14th Street at its intersection with Sixth Avenue.

In the past, every former IRT elevated line had a station at 14th Street:

- 14th Street on the IRT Second Avenue Line
- 14th Street on the IRT Third Avenue Line
- 14th Street on the IRT Sixth Avenue Line
- 14th Street on the IRT Ninth Avenue Line

The following bus routes serve 14th Street:

- The M14A and M14D are the primary servers. The former only runs between Avenue A and Hudson Street, with eastbound service originating at 8th Avenue. The latter is extended to 10th Avenue westbound and Avenue C eastbound, originating at 9th Avenue. Both are Select Bus Service routes.
- Additional service is provided by the M12 westbound from 8th to 10th Avenues and is joined with the M11 at 9th Avenue.
- The M7 runs eastbound from 7th to 6th Avenues.

=== Bus priority and truck access ===
Alongside the Canarsie Tunnel closure between 2019 and 2020, the New York City Department of Transportation began planning conversion of 14th Street between Third and Ninth Avenues into a bus-only corridor during rush hours. The department began planning a new Select Bus Service bus rapid transit route to be implemented across 14th Street. At the time, the M14A/D routes were among the busiest and slowest NYCT bus routes. The M14A/D were converted to Select Bus Service routes on July 1, 2019.

The 14th Street busway was inspired by Toronto's successful King Street Pilot Project, which sped up transit times for transit riders on the 504 King streetcar route, the Toronto Transit Commission's busiest surface route. As part of the busway plan, the only motor vehicles that could use the busway, between 5 a.m. to 10 p.m. daily, would be buses, trucks making deliveries on 14th Street, emergency and Access-A-Ride vehicles. Local traffic would be required to turn off 14th Street at the next intersection. Arthur Schwartz, a lawyer who lives on nearby 12th Street, blocked the plan by filing several injunctions to halt its implementation. As a result, the busway was not implemented as scheduled in July 2019; pushing its implementation back to August 2019. The plan was blocked once again, pending an appeal. The August ruling was later overturned by a panel of judges who approved the busway's implementation, which took effect on October 3, 2019. The busway was so successful on its first day that M14 buses had to be slowed down in order to keep from running ahead of their posted schedules.

== Points of interest ==
From west to east, points of interest include:

- Little Island at Pier 55
- Hudson River Park
- High Line
- New York County National Bank (at Eighth Avenue), a New York City designated landmark
- New York Savings Bank (at Eighth Avenue), a New York City designated landmark and National Register of Historic Places (NRHP) landmark
- Norwood Club (241 West 14th Street), a New York City designated landmark
- 154 West 14th Street, a New York City designated landmark
- 144 West 14th Street, a New York City designated landmark
- 120 West 14th Street (The Salvation Army Greater New York Divisional Headquarters), a New York City designated landmark
- 14th Street Theatre (107 West 14th Street), demolished in 1938.
- R. H. Macy & Co. Store, 14th Street Annex (56 West 14th Street), a New York City designated landmark
- Baumann Brothers Furniture and Carpets Store (22-26 East 14th Street), a New York City designated landmark
- Lincoln Building (at Union Square West), a New York City designated landmark and NRHP landmark
- Union Square Park
- Consolidated Edison Building (at Irving Place), a New York City designated landmark
- First German Baptist Church (334 East 14th Street), a New York City designated landmark
- Grace Chapel (406 East 14th Street), a New York City designated landmark and NRHP landmark
- Immaculate Conception Roman Catholic Church/Grace Chapel Hospital (414 East 14th Street), a New York City designated landmark

== See also ==
- List of numbered streets in Manhattan
