= 204th Street station =

New York City Subway station in the Bronx (closed 1973)

204th Street
- Former New York City Subway station

Station statistics
- Address: Webster Avenue and East 204th Street; Bronx, New York 10467
- Borough: The Bronx
- Locale: Norwood
- Coordinates: 40°52′17″N 73°52′35.5″W
- Division: A (IRT)
- Services: IRT Third Avenue Line
- Structure: Elevated
- Platforms: 2 side platforms
- Tracks: 3

Other information
- Opened: October 4, 1920; 106 years ago
- Closed: April 29, 1973; 53 years ago

Station succession
- Next north: Williamsbridge–210th Street
- Next south: 200th Street
Location
Location within New York City Subway
Location within New York City
Location within New York
Street map
Station service legend
Symbol	Description
Stops all times	Stops in station at all times
Stops all times except late nights	Stops all times except late nights
Stops late nights only	Stops late nights only
Stops late nights and weekends	Stops late nights and weekends only
Stops weekdays during the day	Stops weekdays during the day
Stops weekends during the day	Stops weekends during the day
Stops all times except rush hours in the peak direction	Stops all times except rush hours in the peak direction
Stops all times except weekdays in the peak direction	Stops all times except weekdays in the peak direction
Stops daily except rush hours in the peak direction	Stops all times except nights and rush hours in the peak direction
Stops rush hours only	Stops rush hours only
Stops rush hours in the peak direction only	Stops rush hours in the peak direction only
Station closed	Station is closed
(Details about time periods)

The 204th Street station was a local station on the demolished IRT Third Avenue Line in the Bronx, New York City. It had three tracks and two side platforms. The next stop to the north was Williamsbridge–210th Street. The next stop to the south was 200th Street. The station opened on October 4, 1920, and closed on April 29, 1973.
