= 18th Street station (IRT Third Avenue Line) =

Former Manhattan Railway elevated station (closed 1955)

18th ST.
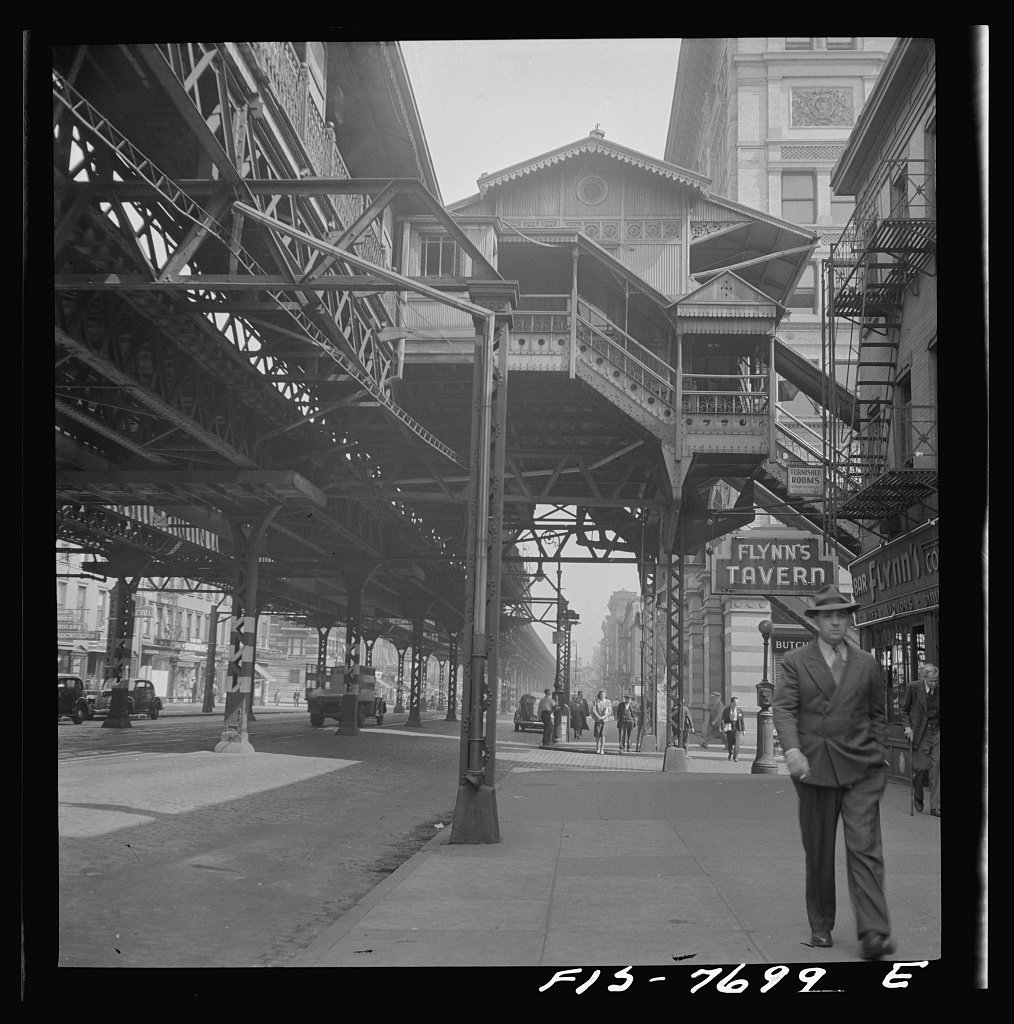
- 1942 street level view of 18th Street station

General information
- Location: East 18th Street and 3rd Avenue; Lower Manhattan, Manhattan, New York
- Coordinates: 40°44′8.7″N 73°59′7″W
- System: Former Manhattan Railway elevated station
- Operator: Interborough Rapid Transit Company; City of New York (1940–1953); New York City Transit Authority
- Line: Third Avenue Line
- Platforms: 2 side platforms
- Tracks: 3

Construction
- Structure type: Elevated

History
- Opened: August 26, 1878; 148 years ago
- Closed: May 12, 1955; 71 years ago

Former services
Preceding station	Interborough Rapid Transit	Following station
23rd Street toward 129th Street	Third Avenue Local	14th Street toward South Ferry
Location

The 18th Street station was a local station on the demolished IRT Third Avenue Line in Manhattan, New York City. The center track was built as part of the Dual Contracts and bypassed the station and served express trains. This station closed on May 12, 1955, with the ending of all service on the Third Avenue El south of 149th Street.
