= Chatham Square station =

Former Manhattan Railway elevated station (closed 1955)

Chatham Square
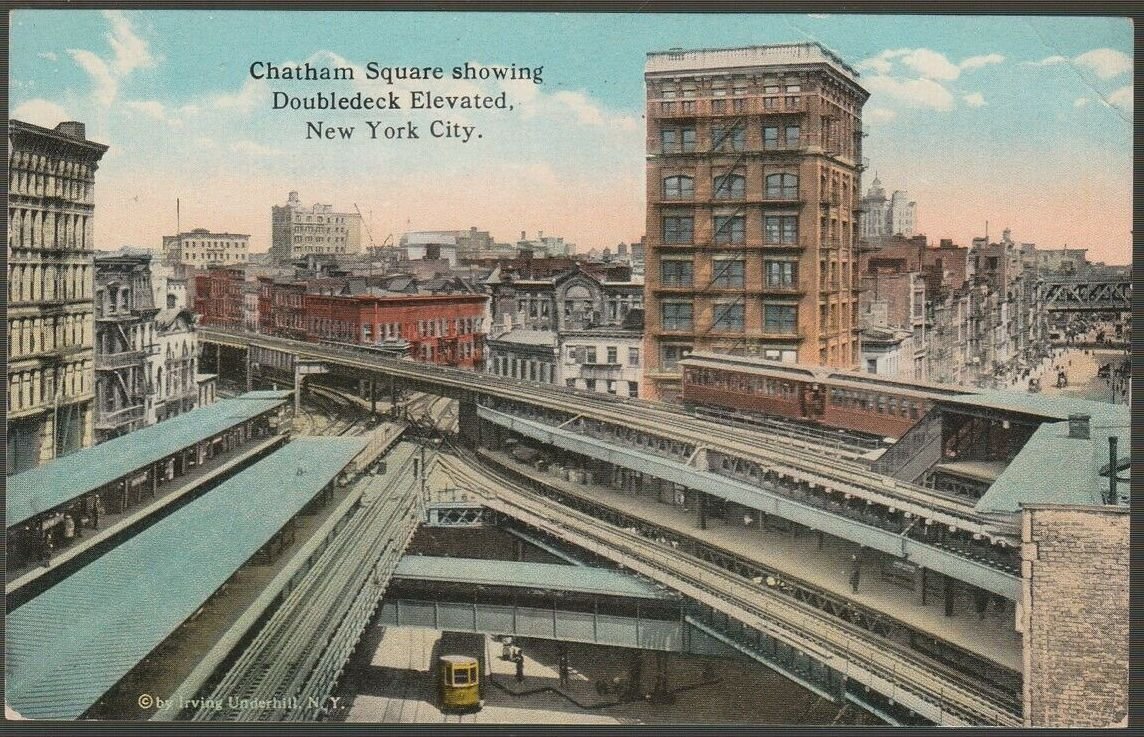
- Chatham Square station on a 1923 postcard

General information
- Location: Chatham Square; Lower Manhattan, Manhattan, New York
- Coordinates: 40°42′49″N 73°59′53″W
- System: Former Manhattan Railway elevated station
- Operator: Interborough Rapid Transit Company; City of New York (1940–1953); New York City Transit Authority
- Lines: Second Avenue Line; Third Avenue Line
- Platforms: 1 island platform (lower level); 2 island platforms (upper level)
- Tracks: 5 (2 lower level) (3 upper level)

Construction
- Structure type: Elevated

History
- Opened: September 16, 1878; 148 years ago (Main junction); March 17, 1879; 147 years ago (City Hall Spur)
- Closed: May 12, 1955; 71 years ago

Former services
Preceding station	Interborough Rapid Transit	Following station
14th Street toward Bronx Park	Second Avenue Express	City Hall Terminus
14th Street toward Ditmars Boulevard	Second Avenue Queens	City Hall Terminus
Canal Street toward Bronx Park	Third Avenue Local-Express	City Hall Terminus
Canal Street (Allen Street) toward 129th Street	Second Avenue Local	Franklin Square toward South Ferry
Canal Street (Bowery) toward 129th Street	Third Avenue Local	Franklin Square toward South Ferry
Location

The Chatham Square station was an express station on the demolished IRT Third Avenue Line in Manhattan, New York City. It had two levels. The lower level had two tracks and one island platform that served trains of both the IRT Second Avenue Line and IRT Third Avenue Line. The upper level had three tracks and two island platforms that served trains of both lines going to and from City Hall. Second Avenue trains served the station until June 13, 1942, and City Hall Spur trains served the station until December 31, 1953. This station closed entirely on May 12, 1955, with the ending of all service on the Third Avenue El south of 149th Street.
