= Eighth Street station (IRT Second Avenue Line) =

Former Manhattan Railway elevated station (closed 1942)

Eighth St.

General information
- Location: Saint Marks Place (formerly East 8th Street) and 1st Avenue; East Village, Manhattan, New York
- Coordinates: 40°43′39.33″N 73°59′7.09″W
- System: Former Manhattan Railway elevated station
- Operator: Interborough Rapid Transit Company; City of New York (after 1940)
- Line: Second Avenue Line
- Platforms: 2 side platforms
- Tracks: 3 (2 – lower level) (1 – upper level)

Construction
- Structure type: Elevated

History
- Opened: March 1, 1880; 146 years ago
- Closed: June 13, 1942; 84 years ago

Former services
Preceding station	Interborough Rapid Transit	Following station
14th Street toward 129th Street	Second Avenue Local	First Street toward South Ferry
Location

The Eighth Street station was a local station on the demolished IRT Second Avenue Line in Manhattan, New York City, located at the intersection of Eighth Street and First Avenue. It had two levels. The lower level had two tracks and two side platforms and the upper level had one track that served express trains. The next stop to the north was 14th Street. The next stop to the south was First Street. The station closed on June 13, 1942.
