= 28th Street station (IRT Third Avenue Line) =

Former Manhattan Railway elevated station (closed 1955)

28th ST.

General information
- Location: East 28th Street and 3rd Avenue; Lower Manhattan, Manhattan, New York
- Coordinates: 40°44′31″N 73°58′51.2″W
- System: Former Manhattan Railway elevated station
- Operator: Interborough Rapid Transit Company; City of New York (1940–1953); New York City Transit Authority
- Line: Third Avenue Line
- Platforms: 2 side platforms
- Tracks: 3

Construction
- Structure type: Elevated

History
- Opened: August 26, 1878; 148 years ago
- Closed: May 12, 1955; 71 years ago

Former services
Preceding station	Interborough Rapid Transit	Following station
34th Street toward 129th Street	Third Avenue Local	23rd Street toward South Ferry
Location

The 28th Street station was a local station on the demolished IRT Third Avenue Line in Manhattan, New York City. It had three tracks and two side platforms. The express track was built as part of the Dual Contracts and bypassed the station. This station closed on May 12, 1955, with the ending of all service on the Third Avenue El south of 149th Street.
