= Williamsbridge–210th Street station =

New York City Subway station in the Bronx (closed 1973)

Williamsbridge–210th Street
- Former New York City Subway station

Station statistics
- Address: Webster Avenue south of Gun Hill Road (210th Street no longer exists here); Bronx, New York
- Borough: The Bronx
- Locale: Then Williamsbridge, now Norwood
- Coordinates: 40°52′40″N 73°52′18.8″W
- Division: A (IRT)
- Services: IRT Third Avenue Line
- Structure: Elevated
- Platforms: 2 side platforms
- Tracks: 3

Other information
- Opened: October 4, 1920; 106 years ago
- Closed: April 29, 1973; 53 years ago
- Former/other names: Williams Bridge–210th Street

Station succession
- Next north: Gun Hill Road
- Next south: 204th Street
Location
Location within New York City Subway
Location within New York City
Location within New York
Street map
Station service legend
Symbol	Description
Stops all times	Stops in station at all times
Stops all times except late nights	Stops all times except late nights
Stops late nights only	Stops late nights only
Stops late nights and weekends	Stops late nights and weekends only
Stops weekdays during the day	Stops weekdays during the day
Stops weekends during the day	Stops weekends during the day
Stops all times except rush hours in the peak direction	Stops all times except rush hours in the peak direction
Stops all times except weekdays in the peak direction	Stops all times except weekdays in the peak direction
Stops daily except rush hours in the peak direction	Stops all times except nights and rush hours in the peak direction
Stops rush hours only	Stops rush hours only
Stops rush hours in the peak direction only	Stops rush hours in the peak direction only
Station closed	Station is closed
(Details about time periods)

The Williamsbridge–210th Street station (Gun Hill Road–210th Street at time of closure) was the penultimate station on the demolished IRT Third Avenue Line in the Bronx, New York City. It had three tracks and two side platforms. It was also in close proximity to Williamsbridge station of the New York and Harlem Railroad, which is today a station on the Metro-North Harlem Line. The next stop to the south was 204th Street. The next stop to the railroad north (compass east) was the lower level at Gun Hill Road under the IRT White Plains Road Line. The station opened on October 4, 1920, and closed on April 29, 1973.
