= 200th Street station =

New York City Subway station in the Bronx (closed 1973)

200th Street
- Former New York City Subway station
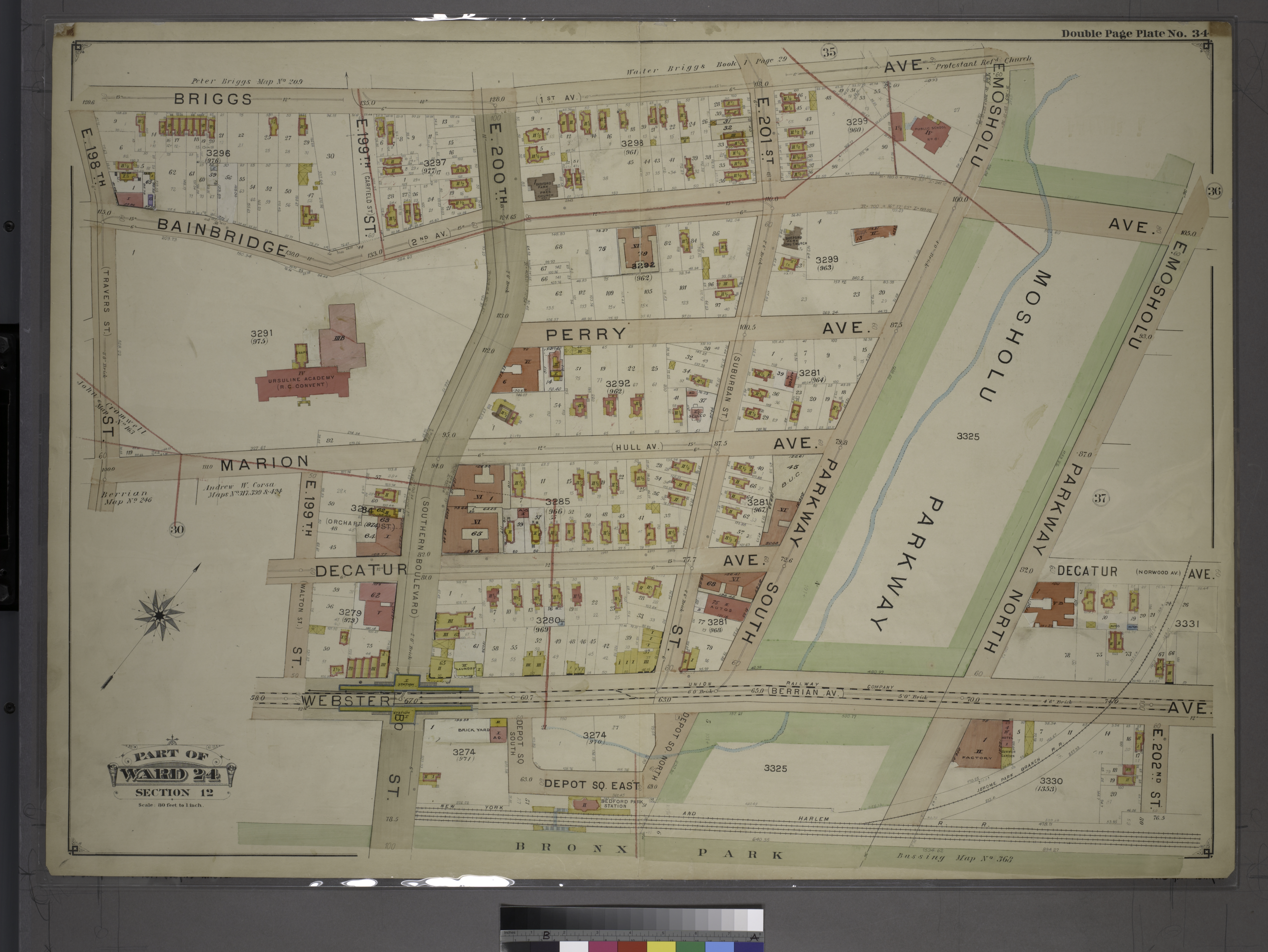

Station statistics
- Address: Webster Avenue and Bedford Park Blvd (then East 200th Street); Bronx, New York 10458
- Borough: The Bronx
- Locale: Bedford Park
- Coordinates: 40°52′2″N 73°53′1″W
- Division: A (IRT)
- Services: IRT Third Avenue Line
- Structure: Elevated
- Platforms: 2 side platforms
- Tracks: 3

Other information
- Opened: October 4, 1920; 106 years ago
- Closed: April 29, 1973; 53 years ago

Station succession
- Next north: 204th Street
- Next south: Fordham Road–190th Street
Location
Location within New York City Subway
Location within New York City
Location within New York
Street map
Station service legend
| Symbol | Description |
| Stops all times | Stops in station at all times |
| Stops all times except late nights | Stops all times except late nights |
| Stops late nights only | Stops late nights only |
| Stops late nights and weekends | Stops late nights and weekends only |
| Stops weekdays during the day | Stops weekdays during the day |
| Stops weekends during the day | Stops weekends during the day |
| Stops all times except rush hours in the peak direction | Stops all times except rush hours in the peak direction |
| Stops all times except weekdays in the peak direction | Stops all times except weekdays in the peak direction |
| Stops daily except rush hours in the peak direction | Stops all times except nights and rush hours in the peak direction |
| Stops rush hours only | Stops rush hours only |
| Stops rush hours in the peak direction only | Stops rush hours in the peak direction only |
| Station closed | Station is closed |
(Details about time periods)

The 200th Street station was a local station on the demolished IRT Third Avenue Line in the Bronx, New York City, near the New York Botanical Garden. The station was opened on October 4, 1920, and had three tracks and two side platforms. It was also one block south of the Botanical Garden New York Central Railroad station. The next stop to the north was 204th Street. The next stop to the south was Fordham Road–190th Street. The station was closed on April 29, 1973, along with the rest of the IRT Third Avenue Line.

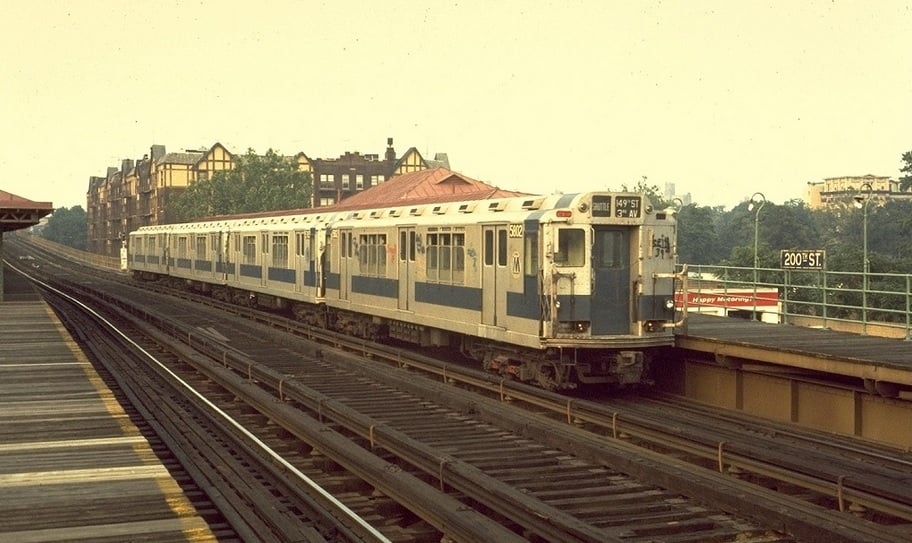
R12 8 train at the station, 1972
