= Manhattan El (New York City Subway car) =

Retired class of Interborough Rapid Transit car

A Manhattan El train at 36th Avenue on the IRT Astoria Line

Manhattan El is a term used to describe Interborough Rapid Transit Company (RT) elevated gate cars used on predecessor lines of the New York City Subway system. These cars were built by the Pullman, Wason, Gilbert & Bush, Bowers & Dure, Barney & Smith, Jewett, St. Louis, Cincinnati, and American Car and Foundry companies.

== Background ==
The Manhattan El cars consisted of a variety of equipment used on the IRT. The majority of the cars were originally built for the predecessor companies that became part of the IRT system in 1903, while other cars were built brand new between 1902 and 1911. Upon the arrival of the first steel cars, no more Manhattan El cars were produced after 1911.

The term Manhattan El was derived from the Manhattan Railway Company, the predecessor railway to the IRT. The term was originally used to describe the gate cars, which had six pairs of four windows. The term would later be extended to refer to the entire series of IRT gated cars. When they were delivered, the word Manhattan was written on the roof of the car. The lettering was later changed to Interborough within a short period.

The fleet comprised both motor cars and trailer cars. The older cars were intermixed with the newer cars upon the latter's delivery. Trains initially comprised three to six cars. An extra motor car would later be added to create a seven-car train.

It is unclear as to whether the term "Manhattan El" was commonly used before the IRT was purchased by the City of New York in 1940, or whether it was mainly an introduced term to describe the wooden elevated cars of the former private company.

== Disambiguation ==
The primary distinguishing feature of Manhattan El cars is that they were elevated cars built mostly or substantially of wood, with or without steel frames, where passenger access to the cars was provided by open platforms at both ends of each car. A trainman between each pair of cars manually opened and closed folding gates to allow or prevent passengers from entering or leaving.

All gate cars used in IRT elevated service can be described as Manhattan Els. This excludes two classes of elevated equipment:

- Steam coaches of companies preceding the IRT that were never converted to, and used in, regular IRT elevated service.
- Former Manhattan El cars (the MUDCs) that were converted into closed cars and the gates replaced by automatically operated subway-style sliding doors.

The Manhattan El cars should not be confused with the BU cars, a series of gate cars that were operated by the Brooklyn Rapid Transit Company.

== Preservation ==
While most Manhattan El cars were either scrapped or rebuilt as MUDCs, a few cars have been preserved.

- Manhattan El Revenue Collection car G is preserved at the Shore Line Trolley Museum. It was on temporary loan at the New York Transit Museum in 2000.
- Car 824, the IRT Motorman Instruction Car, is preserved at the Shore Line Trolley Museum.
- Cars 844 and 889 were used at the Richmond Shipyard Railway in California from 1943 to 1945, where they were renumbered 561 and 563, respectively. These cars were later donated to the Western Railway Museum in Rio Vista, California.

Car 782 was preserved at the Knox & Kane Railroad in Marienville, PA, but was destroyed in an arsonist attack in 2008.
