= Norwood Club =

Social club in New York City

- Andrew Norwood House; The Norwood Club
- U.S. National Register of Historic Places
- New York State Register of Historic Places
- New York City Landmark
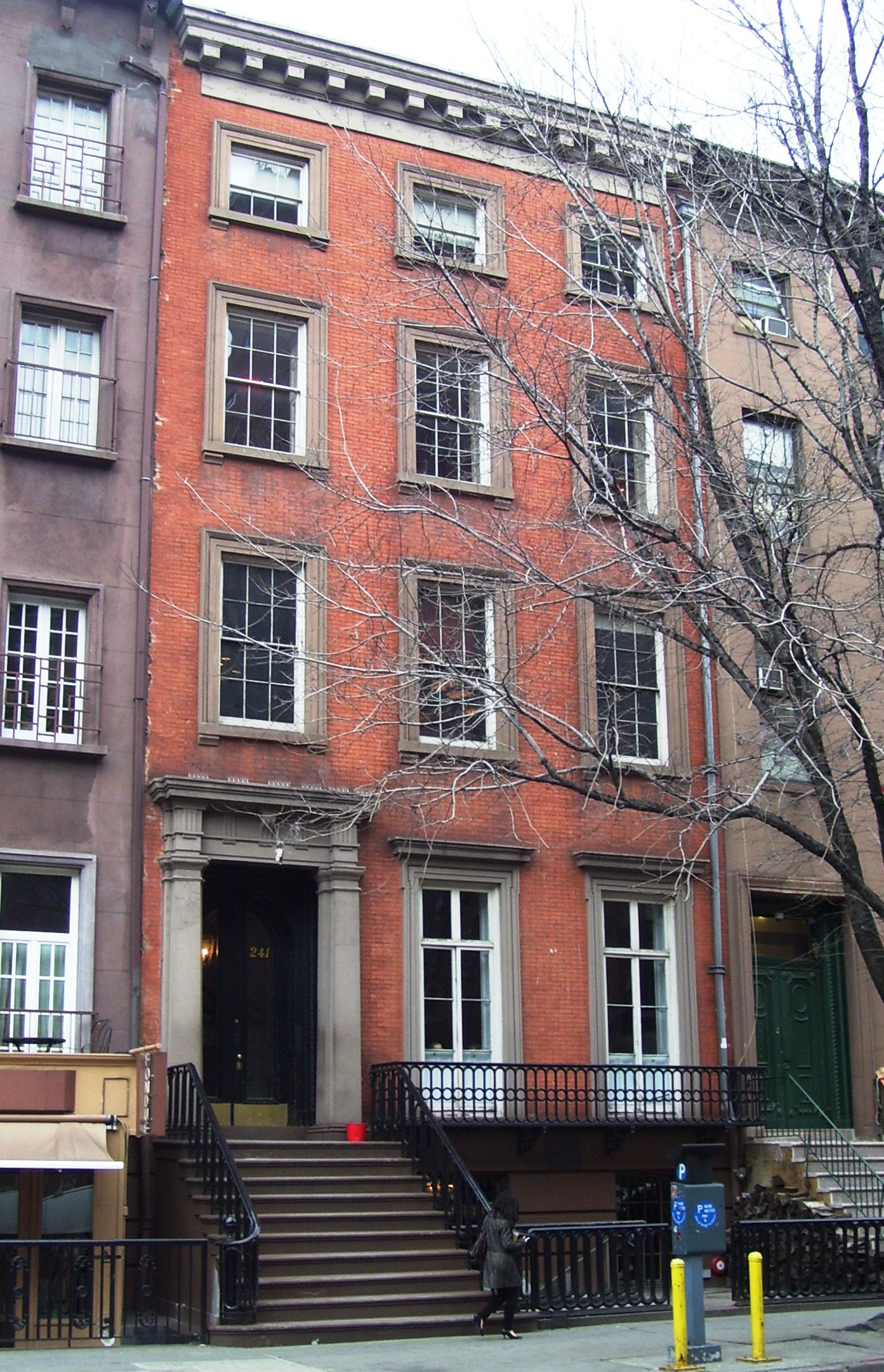
- (2011)

- Location within Manhattan Location within New York City Location within New York Location within the United States
- Location: 241 West 14th Street; Manhattan, New York City
- Coordinates: 40°44′23″N 74°00′07″W
- Built: 1845–1847
- Architectural style: Greek Revival; Italianate
- Website: www.norwoodclub.com
- NRHP reference No.: 79001606
- NYSRHP No.: 06101.000375
- NYCL No.: 0990

Significant dates
- Added to NRHP: July 9, 1979
- Designated NYSRHP: June 23, 1980
- Designated NYCL: May 9, 1978

The Norwood Club was a private members club located in the Chelsea neighborhood of Manhattan in New York City. It was founded in 2007 by Alan Linn and Steve Ruggi, who intended it to be a modern incarnation of the traditional gentlemen's club. Like the fine arts focused Century Association, the Norwood Club drew its membership from New York City's arts and creative community. Linn described the Norwood Club as a "club for the curious." The Norwood Club's members had reciprocity with other private clubs in London, Los Angeles, San Francisco, South Africa, Sydney, Paris, Dublin, Budapest, Toronto, Buenos Aires, and Shanghai.

== Clubhouse ==
The Norwood Club was located in a five-story brownstone townhouse at 241 West 14th Street between Seventh and Eighth Avenues built in 1847 for bond merchant Andrew S. Norwood – who was an active developer in the 14th Street area – and known as the Andrew Norwood House. In the 1840s, Norwood built three townhouses on the north side of West 14th Street between 7th and 8th Avenues, including the Norwood House, which then was a fashionable area of northern Manhattan. The matching houses, which were the first brick or masonry residences to be built on the street, were designed in the Italianate style with late Greek Revival details. Norwood and his family moved into the Norwood House in 1847, and the two houses to the left and right of #241, at #239 and #243, were sold by the beginning of 1853; #243 was later a speakeasy called the Tammany Tough Club. Andrew S. Norwood's son, Andrew G. Norwood, inherited the home in 1858 following his father's death in 1856. It remained in the family until the turn of the century.

Later on, the house was used for various purposes, including a boarding house, the New York Deaconesses Home of the Methodist Church, and a funeral home. In 1976, Raf Borello purchased and restored the home and used it as his private residence until his death in 2005. During this time, the building's exterior was given landmark status. In 2006, Borello's heirs sold the home to a group that included Alan Linn who founded the Norwood Club in it. Linn employed British interior designer Simon Costin to convert the space without losing its artistic and historical integrity. The Norwood Club then opened its doors in 2007. The Norwood House contains 13 marble fireplaces, mahogany interior doors, elaborate plaster ceiling moldings, a cast iron balcony, an elegant curving staircase, and a stained glass skylight.

The Norwood Club contained a restaurant, two lounge bars, a screening room and a walled garden with seating. The top floor housed the screening room and a small roof deck. A hidden door on the main floor lead to a staircase to the lower dining room, which members could use for private events. The entire club featured paintings, drawings and sculptures that were changed once each year. Many of the art pieces and books that were displayed were donated by the members.

The house has been a New York City Landmark since 1978 and on the National Register of Historic Places since 1979. It is one of the few townhouses of its type still extant in Manhattan. In December 2020, the building was listed for sale.

The Norwood Club closed in February 2022.

== Membership ==
Club membership was selective. The application process included completing written questions which addressed potential members interests in the arts and motivation for joining Norwood, as well as a required interview and tour of the facilities. The club had about 1100 members, as well as a wait-list for new members.

== See also ==
- List of traditional gentlemen's clubs in the United States
- List of New York City Designated Landmarks in Manhattan from 14th to 59th Streets
- National Register of Historic Places listings in Manhattan from 14th to 59th Streets
