= 14th Street station (IRT Third Avenue Line) =

Former Manhattan Railway elevated station (closed 1955)

14th ST.
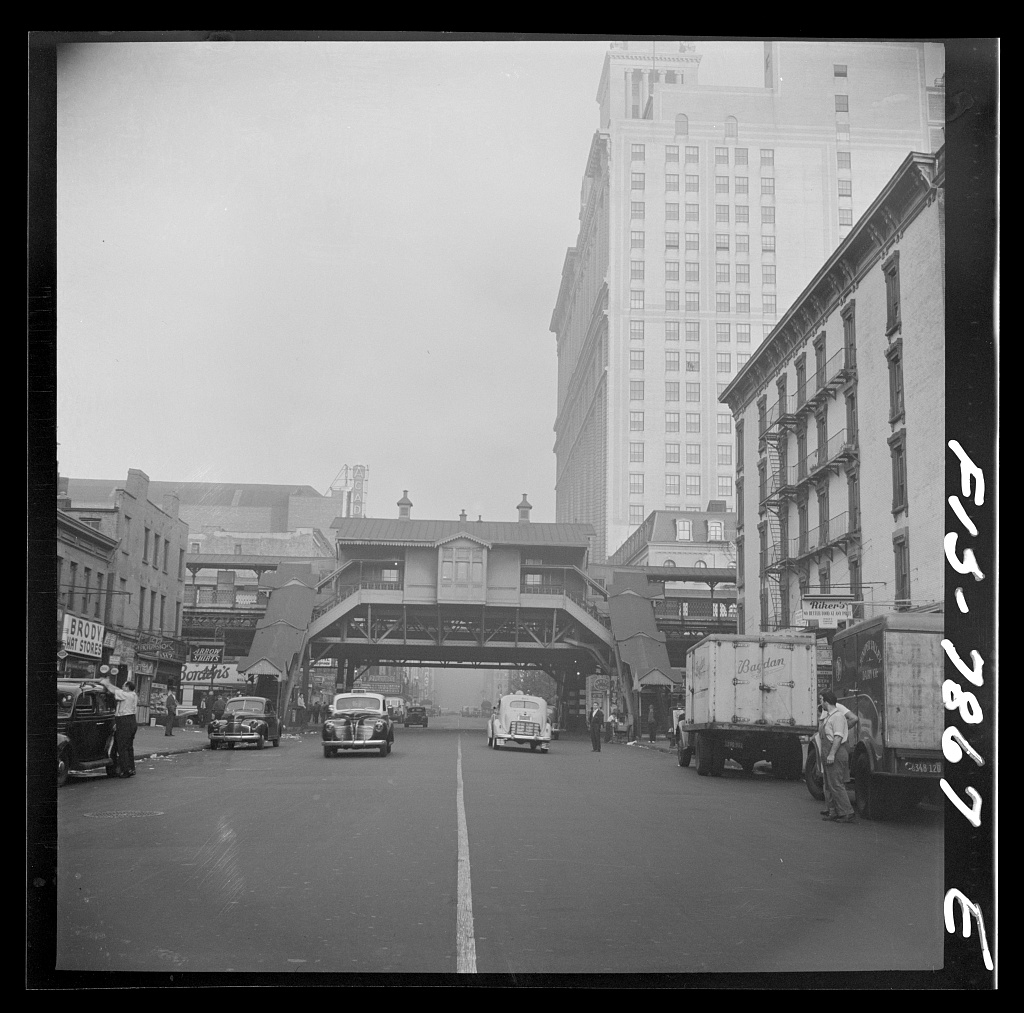
- Looking west at 14th Street station

General information
- Location: East 14th Street and 3rd Avenue; Lower Manhattan, Manhattan, New York
- Coordinates: 40°43′59.8″N 73°59′14″W
- System: Former Manhattan Railway elevated station
- Operator: Interborough Rapid Transit Company; City of New York (1940–1953); New York City Transit Authority
- Line: Third Avenue Line
- Platforms: 2 side platforms
- Tracks: 3 (1 – upper level) (2 – lower level)

Construction
- Structure type: Elevated

History
- Opened: August 26, 1878; 148 years ago
- Closed: May 12, 1955; 71 years ago

Former services
Preceding station	Interborough Rapid Transit	Following station
18th Street toward 129th Street	Third Avenue Local	Ninth Street toward South Ferry
Location

The 14th Street station was a local station on the demolished IRT Third Avenue Line in Manhattan, New York City. It had two levels. The lower level was served by local trains and had two tracks and two side platforms. It was built first. The upper level was built as part of the Dual Contracts and had one track that bypassed the station and served express trains. In 1924, the Brooklyn–Manhattan Transit Corporation built the 14th Street-Eastern District Line Subway below the station, which included the Third Avenue subway station. Although this station was located above the Third Avenue BMT subway station on what is today known as the BMT Canarsie Line, the two stations were never connected. This station closed on May 12, 1955, with the ending of all service on the Third Avenue El south of 149th Street.
