= IRT Third Avenue Line =

Former New York City rapid transit line

IRT Third Avenue Elevated
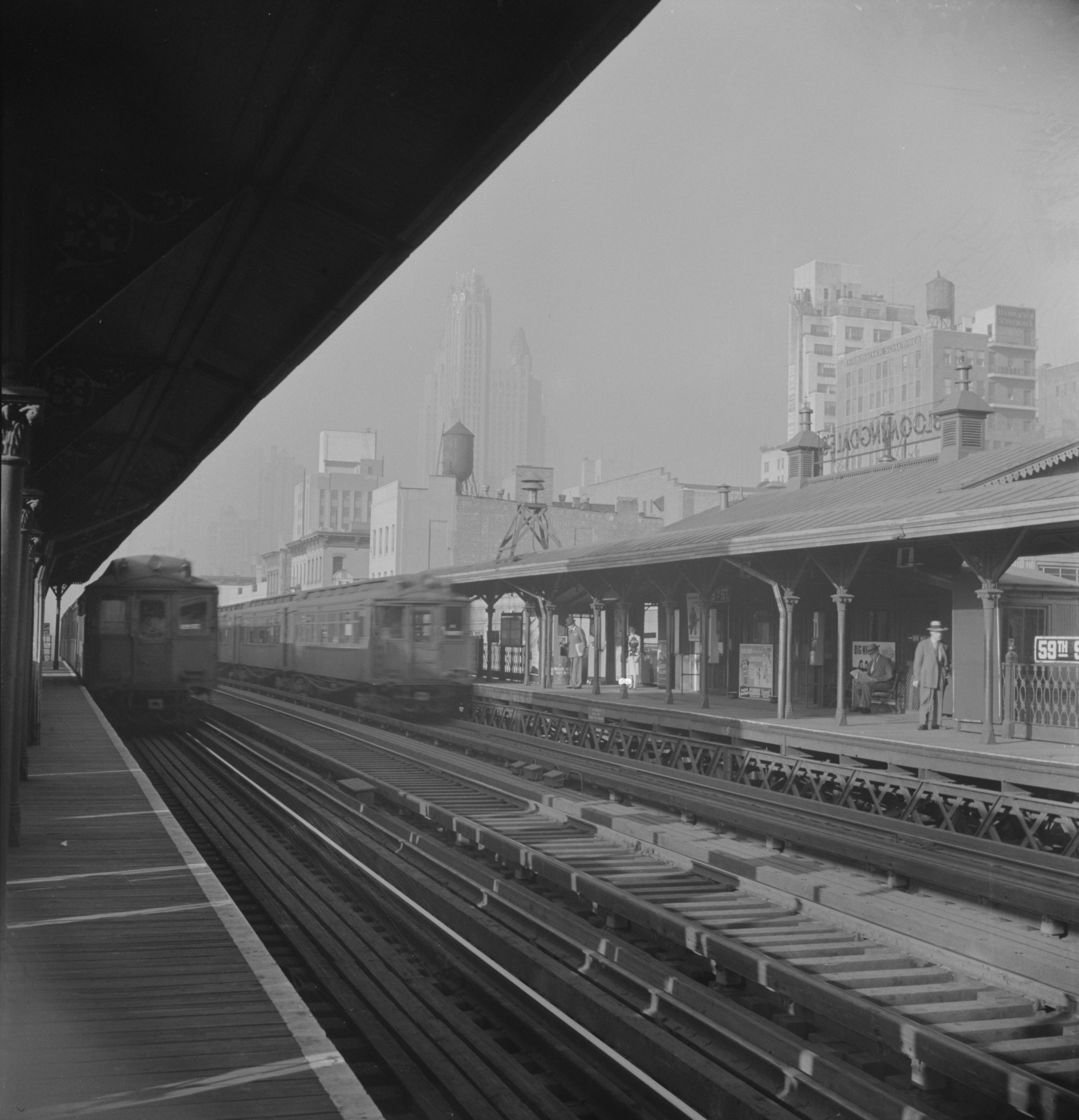
- Third Avenue elevated trains at 59th Street

Overview
- Owner: City of New York
- Termini: Gun Hill Road Bronx Park Terminal; City Hall South Ferry

Service
- Type: Rapid transit
- System: Interborough Rapid Transit Company
- Operator: New York City Transit Authority

History
- Opened: 1878–1891; 1901–1920 (North of 177th Street)
- Closed: 1950–1955 (South of 149th street); 1973 (North of 149th Street)

Technical
- Number of tracks: 2-3
- Character: Elevated
- Track gauge: 4 ft 8 1/2 in (1,435 mm) standard gauge

The IRT Third Avenue Line, commonly known as the Third Avenue Elevated, Third Avenue El, or Bronx El, was an elevated railway in Manhattan and the Bronx, New York City. Originally operated by the New York Elevated Railway, an independent railway company, it was acquired by the Interborough Rapid Transit Company (IRT) and eventually became part of the New York City Subway system.

The first segment of the line, with service at most stations, opened from South Ferry to Grand Central Depot on August 26, 1878. Service was extended to Harlem in Manhattan on December 30. In 1881 this line already began 24/7 service. Service in Manhattan was phased out in the early 1950s and closed completely on May 12, 1955. The remaining service in the Bronx was designated as part of the 8 route until it was discontinued on April 29, 1973.

The Third Avenue El was the last elevated line to operate in Manhattan, other than the 1 train on the IRT Broadway–Seventh Avenue Line (which has elevated sections between 122nd and 135th Streets and north of Dyckman Street), and was a frequent backdrop for movies. Service on the Second, Sixth, and Ninth Avenue elevated lines were terminated in 1942, 1938, and 1940, respectively.

== History ==
=== Operation ===
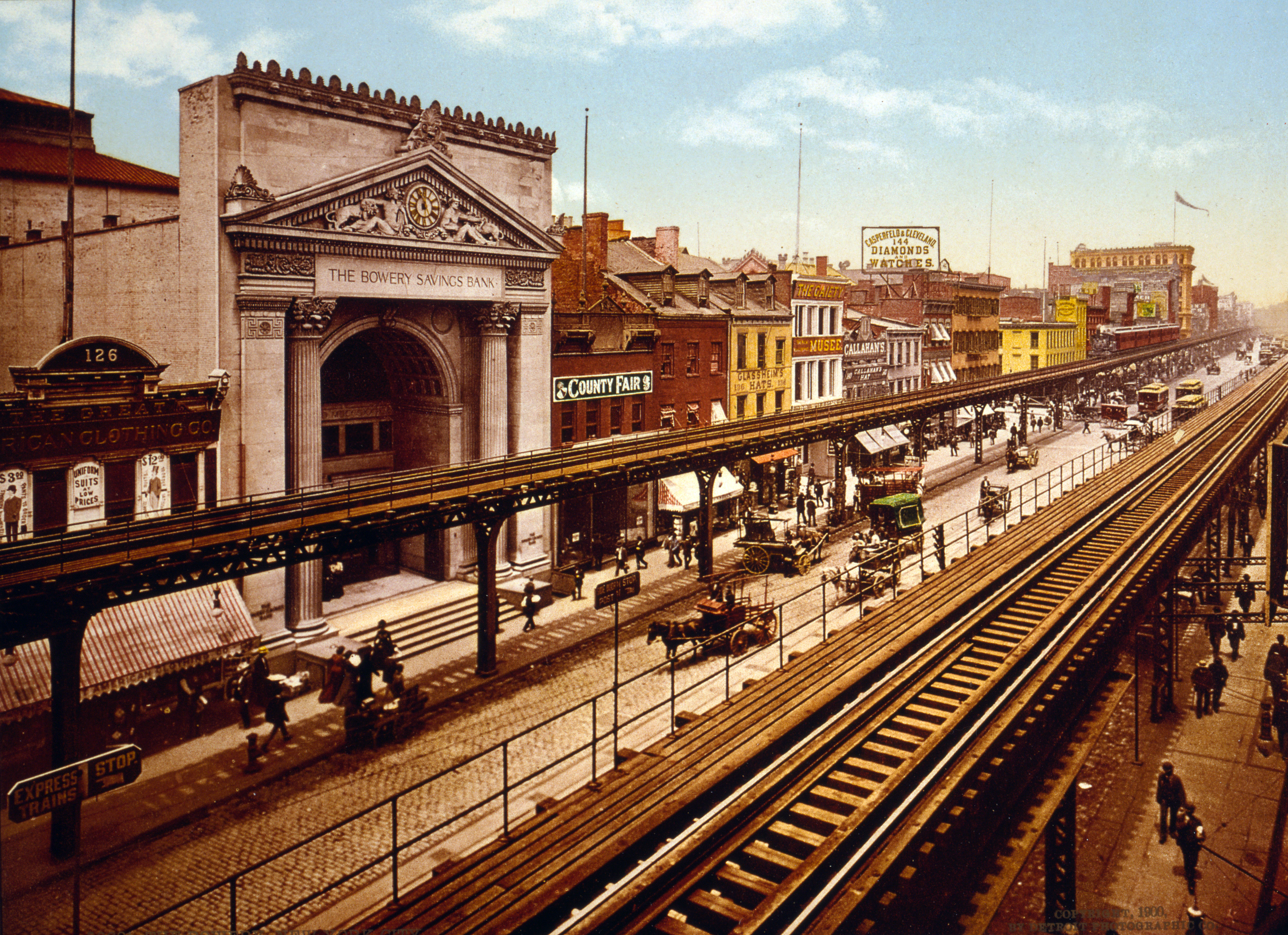
The Third Avenue El over the Bowery in the 1890s.

In 1875, the Rapid Transit Commission granted the New York Elevated Railway Company the right to construct the railway from Battery Park to the Harlem River along the Bowery and Third Avenue. At that time the company already operated the Ninth Avenue Elevated, which it acquired in 1871 after the bankruptcy of the West Side and Yonkers Patent Railway. The Third Avenue El opened in 1878, running from South Ferry to 129th Street. The Manhattan Railway Company took control of the New York Elevated Railroad in 1879. In 1886, the Suburban Rapid Transit Company commenced operations with a railway line over the Harlem River (via a double-decked swing bridge located between the Third Avenue Bridge and Willis Avenue Bridge with the upper deck carrying the express tracks, the lower one the local tracks, and a pedestrian walkway) from the Manhattan Railway's northern terminal at 129th Street to 133rd Street in the southern Bronx, known then as the "Annexed District". The Manhattan Railway assumed operations of the Suburban in 1891 as an extension of the Third Avenue Line, and through service between the Bronx and Manhattan began in 1896. A 999-year lease of the Manhattan Railway was brokered by the Interborough Rapid Transit Company in 1902, for which rapid transit services in the Bronx, of which the Third Avenue Line was a part, would eventually be coordinated alongside the new subway. Around this time, the line was electrified.

Third Avenue El at the Bowery

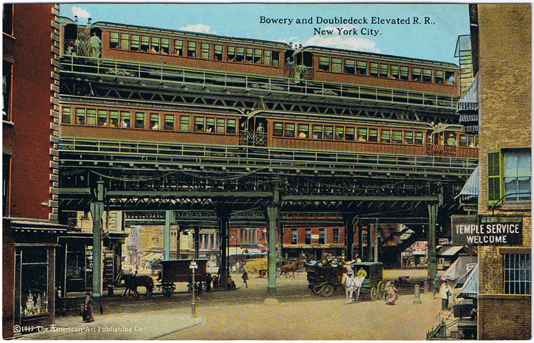
1917 postcard

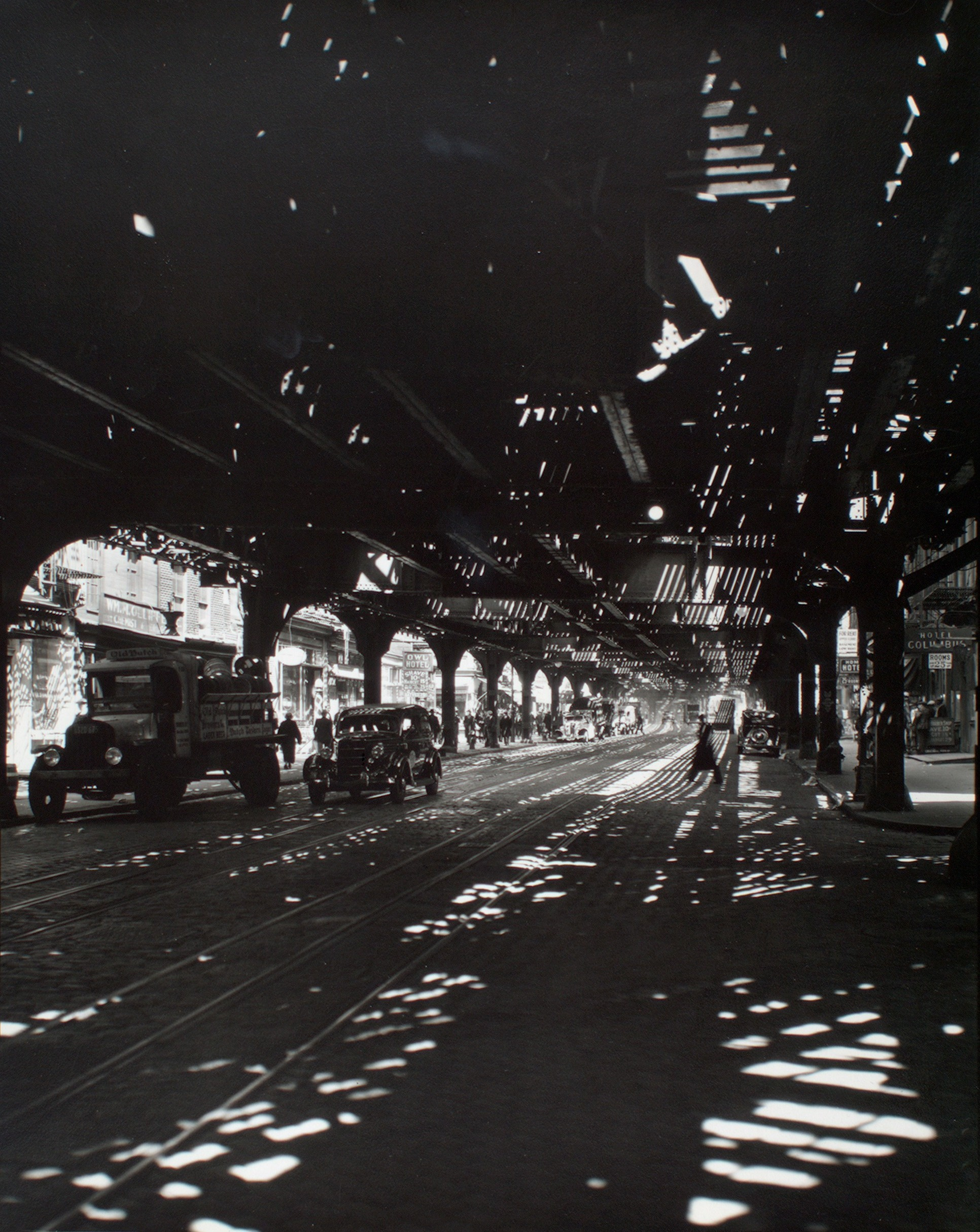
Under the El, from Division Street, 1936, Berenice Abbott

As part of the Dual Contracts, this line was triple-tracked. The project, which caused minimal disruption to the line itself while works were ongoing, allowed for weekday peak direction express service and increased train capacity on the line. For New York City's transportation system, the project was "a more important engineering feat than the building of the Panama Canal" according to the IRT. The center track of the Bronx portion opened on January 17, 1916; in Manhattan it was opened on July 9, 1917.

As of 1934, the following services were being operated:

- 3rd Avenue Local - South Ferry to 129th Street weekdays and Saturdays day and evenings, South Ferry to Bronx Park Sundays day and evenings, also between City Hall and Bronx Park weekdays AM and PM peak, also Saturdays AM peak. During late nights, a shuttle was operated between South Ferry and Canal Street connecting with trains from City Hall to Bronx Park.
- 3rd Avenue Thru-Express - City Hall to 241st St via White Plains Road Line weekday and Saturday AM peak northbound and weekday PM peak southbound, using the center express track south of Tremont Avenue. All other hours a shuttle operated between 241st Street and Fordham Road.
- 3rd Avenue Local-Express - City Hall to Bronx Park - weekdays and Saturdays day and evening, using the center express track south of 129th Street southbound until noon and northbound afternoon thru evening. Trains running in the opposite direction made all local stops.

In December 1937, some weekday midday and evening, Saturday midday thru evening local-expresses, and all Sunday and late-night locals were extended to 241st Street, replacing shuttles except northbound in the AM peak and southbound in the PM peak.

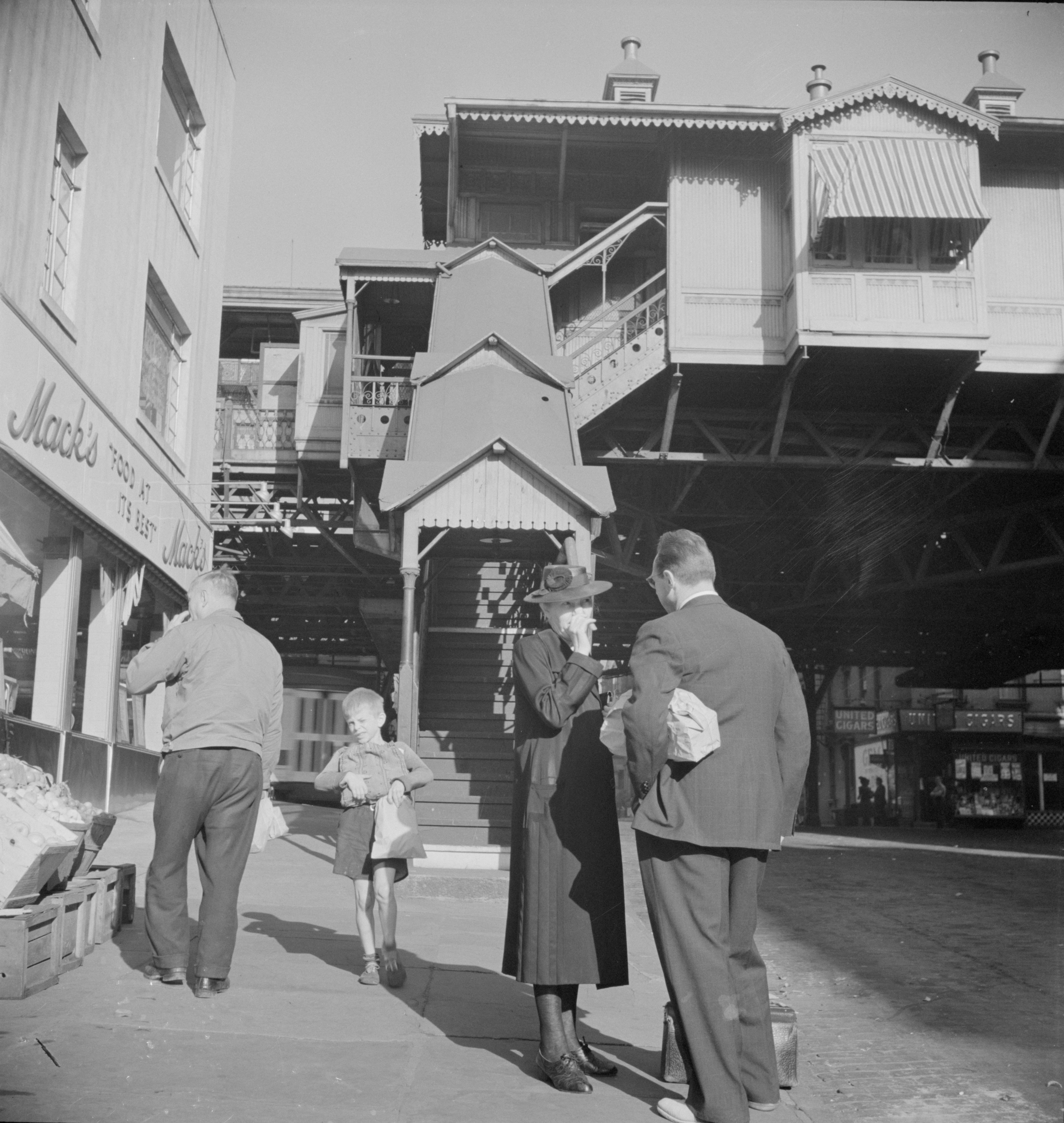
84th Street station of the Third Avenue El in September 1942

In 1943, Sunday evening local trains were rerouted to City Hall, with shuttles from Canal Street running to South Ferry. On November 5, 1946, service to Freeman Street was stopped, and all weekday and Saturday morning peak locals were routed to South Ferry. In 1947, Saturday service was further reduced. 129th Street local trains were eliminated, as were morning peak thru-expresses, which were changed to local-expresses. Saturday midday and evening local-expresses ran from South Ferry or City Hall to Tremont Avenue–177th Street, and locals from South Ferry or City Hall to Bronx Park. On April 22, 1950, Saturday morning local-expresses were converted to locals. On April 30, 1950, all Sunday locals were routed to South Ferry, with a shuttle connection from Canal Street to City Hall. However, on December 22, the line from Chatham Square to South Ferry was closed, with all trains running to City Hall except weekday peak locals that ended at Chatham Square. In addition, weekday peak service north of Gun Hill Road was eliminated, as were weekday locals to 129th Street.

On March 14, 1952, service south of 149th Street was reduced to weekday daytime only, with Gun Hill Road to 149th Street locals at other times. On May 29, 1952, weekday midday local-expresses were eliminated. On June 26, 1952, thru-expresses were cut back to Gun Hill Road. On November 21, 1952, morning rush hour locals were cut back from Chatham Square to Canal Street, and PM rush hour locals were cut back from Fordham Road to 125th Street. However, this resulted in severe overcrowding, so local service to Fordham Road in the PM peak direction was resumed on December 3, 1952. On December 31, 1953, the Chatham Square to City Hall portion of the line was closed. Service then consisted of local trains from Tremont Avenue or 129th Street and Canal Street in the weekday morning peak, Gun Hill Road and Chatham Square midday, and Chatham Square and 129th Street or Tremont Avenue in the PM peak. Local-expresses and thru-expresses operated between Gun Hill Road and Chatham Square southbound in the AM and northbound in the PM peak hours. Evening, all-night, and weekend service was Gun Hill Road to 149th Street locals. When the El was closed in Manhattan in 1955, the East Side was left with the overcrowded IRT Lexington Avenue Line as the only subway east of Fifth Avenue.

=== Closures ===
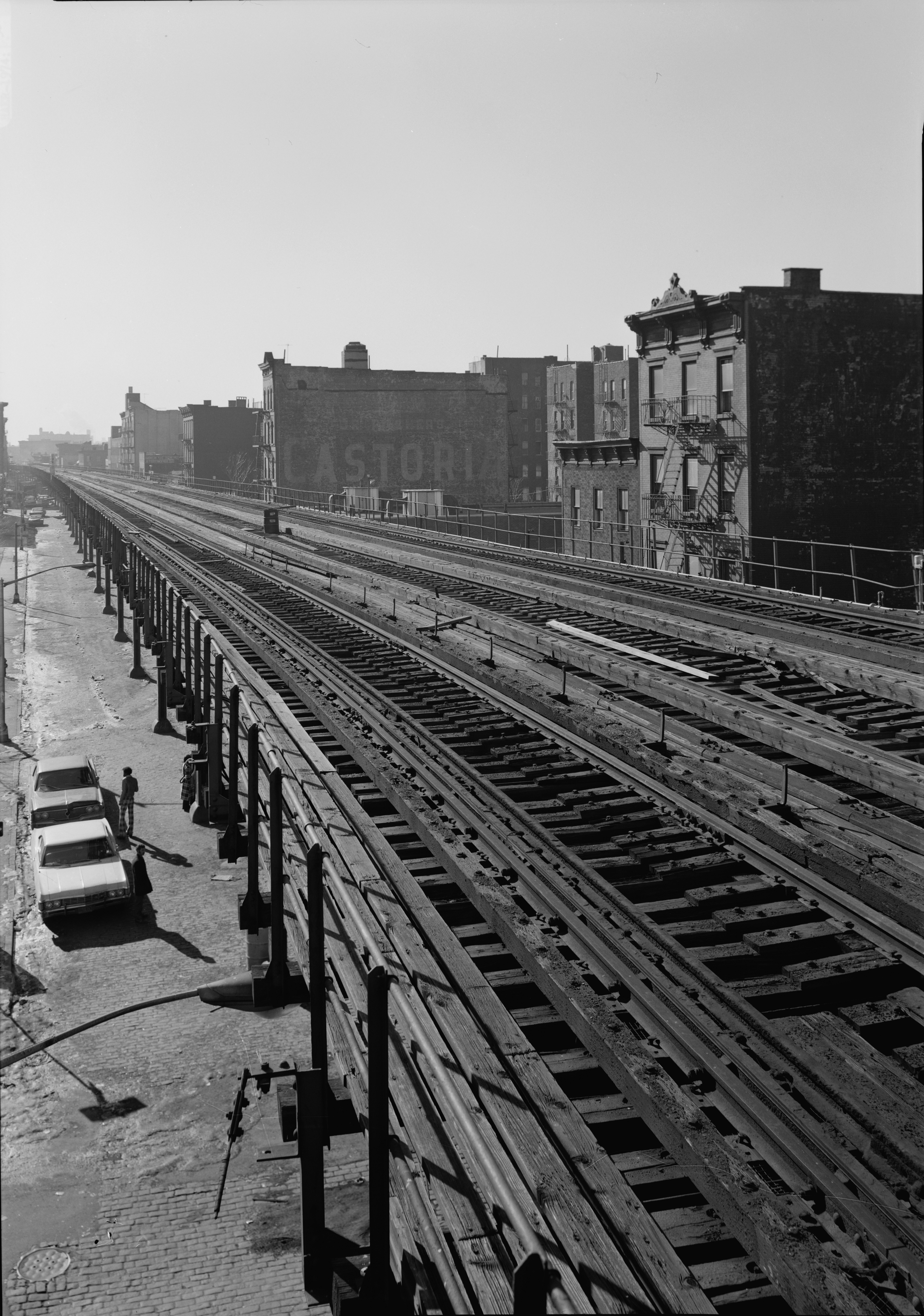
Third Avenue El, looking south from 169th Street shortly before the Bronx portion was demolished.

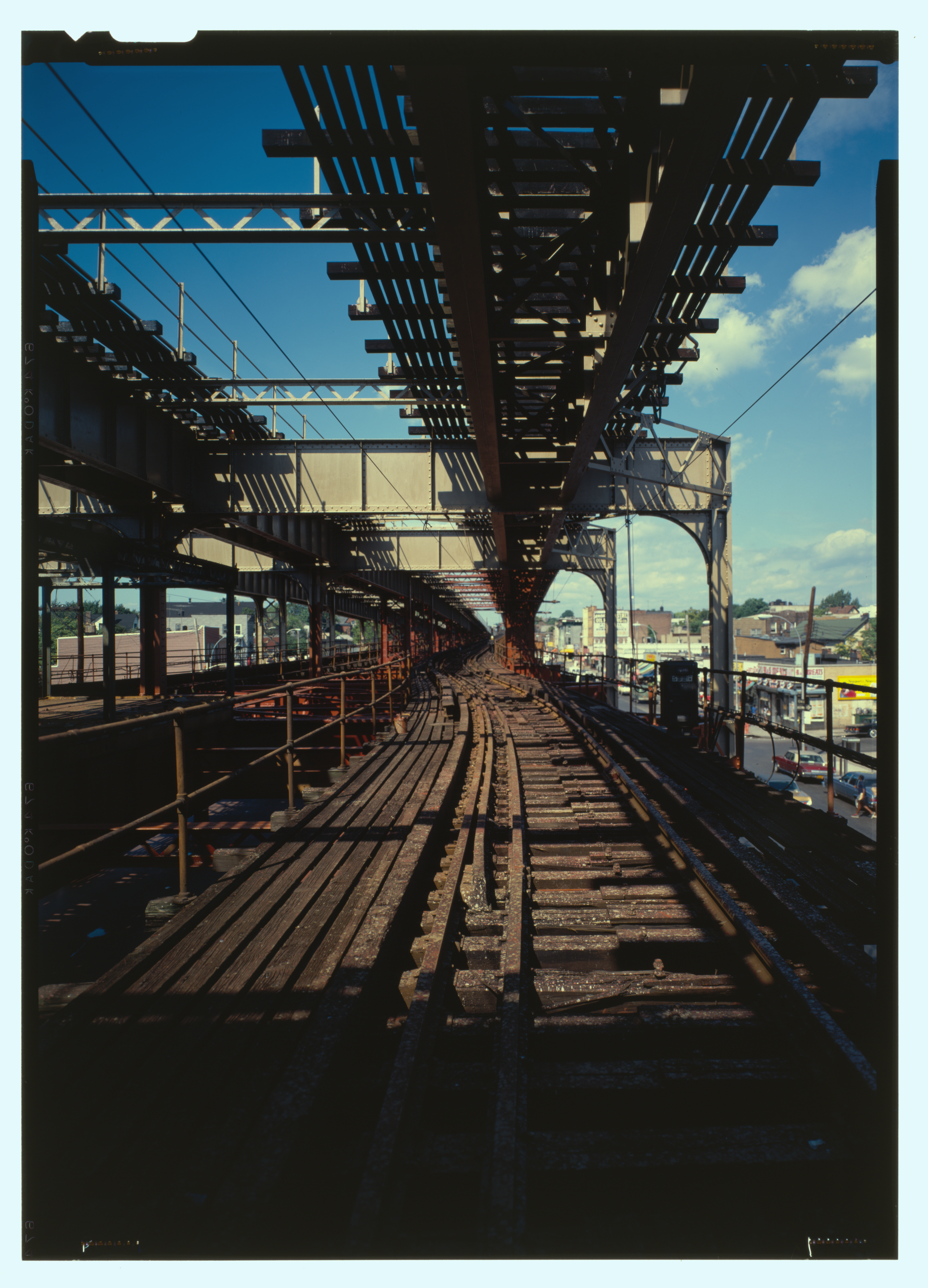
Third Avenue El tracks

In the 1930s and 1940s, as part of the integration of the different subway companies in New York City—the IRT along with Brooklyn–Manhattan Transit (BMT) and Independent Subway System (IND)—the Third Avenue elevated and its counterparts on Second, Sixth, and Ninth Avenues came under criticism from New York mayor Fiorello La Guardia and his successors. The elevateds were regarded as blights on their communities and obsolete, since the subways were being built or were planned to replace them.

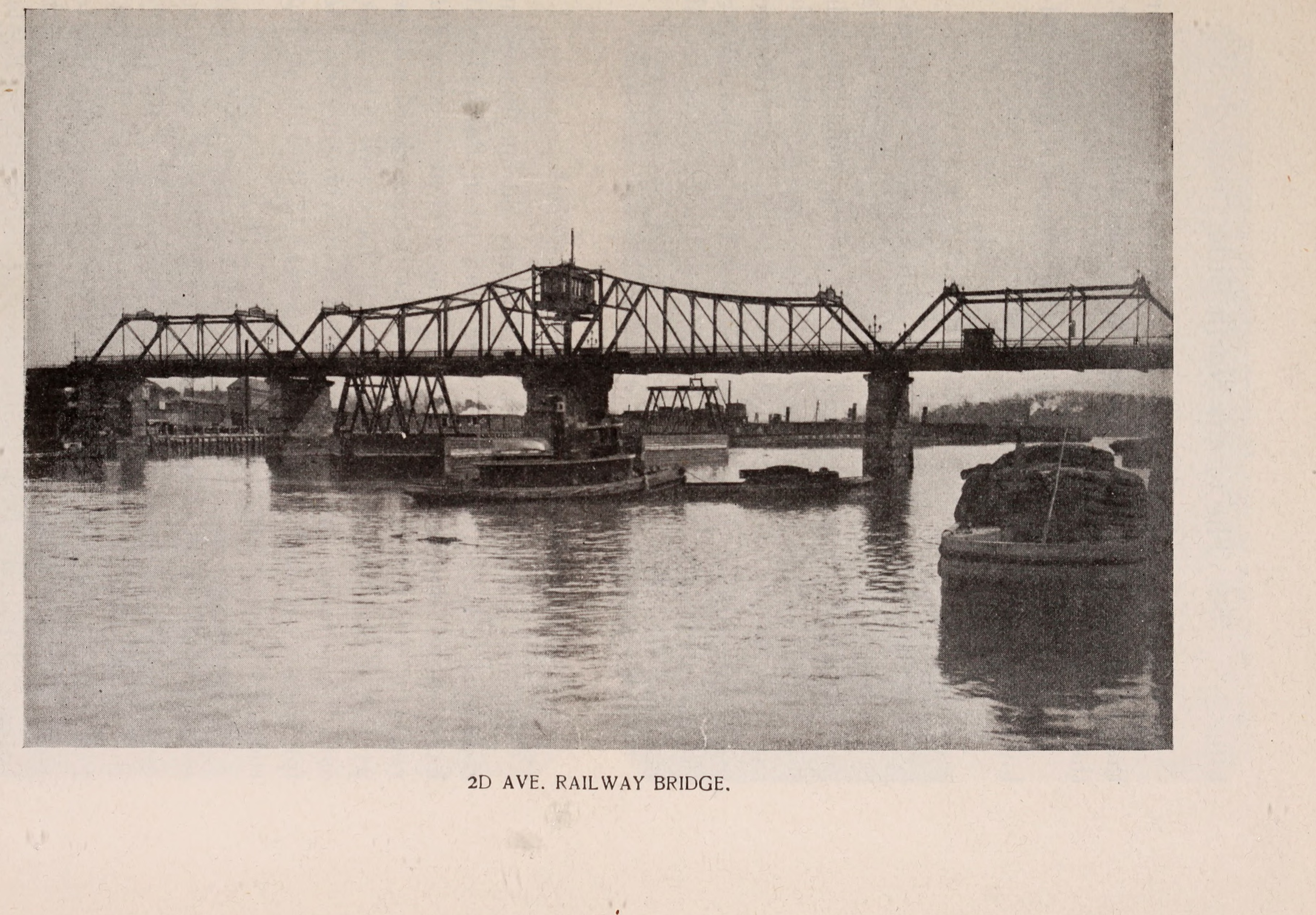
Second Avenue Bridge in the 1890s

The IND Sixth Avenue Line and the IND Eighth Avenue Line rendered the Sixth and Ninth Avenue elevateds obsolete, except for a small shuttle that served the Polo Grounds on the Ninth Avenue Line. They were closed by 1940 and demolished by 1941. The Second Avenue elevated was also gradually demolished from 1940 to 1942. When the Second Avenue elevated was closed on June 13, 1942, the weekday and Saturday Chatham Square to Freeman Street via the West Farms line service was rerouted via the Third Avenue Line, running express south of 129th Street. The Third Avenue elevated was kept open because it was intended to stay in use until the Second Avenue Subway was built to replace it. Pressure against the elevated from real estate interests soon began, with the creation in 1941 of the Third Avenue Elevated Noise Abatement Committee, which consisted of what The New York Times described as "men in the real estate business." The committee initially sought a decrease in train service, saying the noise from the elevated "constitutes a menace to health, comfort and peaceable home life."

The system was closed in sections from 1950 to 1973. First, the South Ferry spur, which connected South Ferry to Chatham Square, was closed on December 22, 1950. This permanently closed the South Ferry elevated station, which had previously served all four IRT elevated lines that originally ran in Manhattan. Free transfers were provided to the M13 bus to make up for the loss in service.

The Bronx Park terminal station was closed on November 14, 1951, with morning peak and midday locals thenceforth running to Gun Hill Road, and afternoon peak locals running to Fordham Road. Morning peak local-express trains started at Fordham Road, while PM peak local-express trains were extended to Gun Hill Road. On March 14, 1952, evening, nighttime and weekend and holiday service was discontinued south of 149th Street.

Next to close was the City Hall spur in 1953, which started at Park Row in Manhattan and then connected with the South Ferry spur at Chatham Square. On May 12, 1955, the main portion of the line closed from Chatham Square to East 149th Street in the Bronx, ending the operation of elevated service in Manhattan. The removal was a catalyst in a wave of new construction, adding property values on the East Side, while bringing increased isolation and hastened decline throughout much of the Bronx. The head of the Real Estate Board of New York suggested that Third Avenue be renamed "the Bouwerie" to symbolize the transformation.

In 1967, the remaining service in the Bronx was formally given the 8 route designation. However, the 8 bullet was only marked on maps and station signs; cars always displayed SHUTTLE and the terminal destination.

Under the MTA's 1968 Program for Action, plans were made for demolition of the remaining line as part of the city's effort to remove "obsolete elevated railway structures", which also saw the razing of portions of the BMT Jamaica elevated in Queens. It was to be replaced with a parallel line along the Metro-North Harlem Line's right-of-way, part of the Second Avenue Subway plan. Local residents and business owners also sought similar revival seen following the closure of the line's sections in Manhattan. However, the line was cancelled after the defeat of a $2.5-billion transportation bond issue in November 1971. The remaining portion in the Bronx from East 149th Street to Gun Hill Road finally closed on April 29, 1973 and demolition started on March 9, 1977. Demolition was completed by the end of 1977, along with the condemned portion of the Jamaica Line.

Work on the planned Second Avenue Subway was suspended, due to the 1970s fiscal crisis. In the Bronx, the Third Avenue el was replaced by the Bx55 bus, making only the stops the train made. This bus route was one of the first to have free transfers to and from the subway, with the three transfer points at the Third Avenue–149th Street and Gun Hill Road IRT White Plains Road Line stations, and the 161st Street–Yankee Stadium station. The other two bus-subway transfers were from the B35 and B42 in Brooklyn, which replaced the BMT Culver Line and BMT Canarsie Line, respectively. With the introduction of free bus to subway transfers systemwide in the 1990s, the three routes lost their special status, although the B42 terminates in a loop inside fare control at Rockaway Parkway. In 2013, the Bx55 was eliminated with the introduction of the Bx41 Select Bus Service. It was partially replaced by the Bx41 SBS and the Bx15 Limited, the latter of which it used to run to West Harlem, Manhattan via 125th Street until service was cut back to 149th Street in The Hub due to the Bronx Bus Network Redesign on June 26th, 2022, but does not extend past Fordham Plaza to Gun Hill Road.

== Station listing ==
Station	Tracks	Opened	Closed	Transfers and notes
Gun Hill Road	Express	October 4, 1920	April 29, 1973	White Plains Road Line
Williamsbridge–210th Street	Local	October 4, 1920	April 29, 1973	
204th Street	Local	October 4, 1920	April 29, 1973	
200th Street	Local	October 4, 1920	April 29, 1973	
Bronx Park Terminal	Spur	May 21, 1902	November 14, 1951	End of the line until October 4, 1920
Fordham Road–190th Street	Express	July 1, 1901	April 29, 1973	NYC Harlem Line; originally Pelham Avenue
183rd Street	Local	July 1, 1901	April 29, 1973	
180th Street	Local	July 1, 1901	April 29, 1973	
Tremont Avenue–177th Street	Express	July 20, 1891	April 29, 1973	Originally 177th Street; served Bronx Borough Hall
174th Street	Local	July 20, 1891	April 29, 1973	
Claremont Parkway	Local	September 19, 1888	April 29, 1973	Originally Wendover Avenue
169th Street	Local	September 2, 1888	April 29, 1973	
166th Street	Local	December 25, 1887	April 29, 1973	
161st Street	Local	August 7, 1887	April 29, 1973	
156th Street	Local	July 1, 1887	April 29, 1973	
149th Street	Express	June 16, 1887	April 29, 1973	White Plains Road Line
143rd Street	Express	May 23, 1886	May 12, 1955	
138th Street	Express	January 1, 1887	May 12, 1955	
133rd Street	Express	May 17, 1886	May 12, 1955	NYWBRR (1924-1937); NYNHH Harlem River Line (1924-1931)
Willis Avenue	Spur	November 25, 1886	April 14, 1924	NYWB and NYNHH Harlem River Branch
129th Street	Local	December 30, 1878	July 1, 1950	Second Avenue Line
125th Street	Express	December 30, 1878	May 12, 1955	
116th Street	Local	December 30, 1878	May 12, 1955	
106th Street	Express	December 30, 1878	May 12, 1955	
99th Street	Local	December 30, 1878	May 12, 1955	
89th Street	Local	December 9, 1878	May 12, 1955	
84th Street	Local	December 9, 1878	May 12, 1955	
76th Street	Local	December 9, 1878	May 12, 1955	
67th Street	Local	September 16, 1878	May 12, 1955	
59th Street	Local	September 16, 1878	May 12, 1955	
53rd Street	Local	September 16, 1878	May 12, 1955	
47th Street	Local	September 16, 1878	May 12, 1955	
Grand Central	Spur	August 26, 1878	December 6, 1923	
Third Avenue	Spur	August 26, 1878	December 6, 1923	
42nd Street	Express	September 16, 1878	May 12, 1955	Flushing Line, Lexington Avenue Line and 42nd Street Shuttle at Grand Central–42nd Street
Third Avenue	Spur		July 14, 1930	
Second Avenue	Spur		July 14, 1930	Second Avenue Line
34th Street Ferry	Spur	July 1, 1880	July 14, 1930	
34th Street	Local	August 26, 1878	May 12, 1955	
28th Street	Local		May 12, 1955	
23rd Street	Express	August 26, 1878	May 12, 1955	
18th Street	Local		May 12, 1955	
14th Street	Local	August 26, 1878	May 12, 1955	
Ninth Street	Express	August 26, 1878	May 12, 1955	
Houston Street	Express	September 16, 1878	May 12, 1955	
Grand Street	Express		May 12, 1955	
Canal Street	Express		May 12, 1955	
Chatham Square	Spur	March 17, 1879	December 31, 1953	
City Hall	Spur	March 17, 1879	December 31, 1953	
Chatham Square	Express	September 16, 1878	May 12, 1955	Original station was north of an at-grade merge from the spur
Franklin Square	Express	August 26, 1878	December 22, 1950	
Fulton Street	Express	August 26, 1878	December 22, 1950	
Hanover Square	Express	August 26, 1878	December 22, 1950	
South Ferry	Express	August 26, 1878	December 22, 1950	

== Notes and references ==
=== References ===
- "Crossings on Elevated Roads", The New York Times, March 14, 1879, page 8.
- 3rd AVE. EL An ARDEE FILMS Release (ca. 1950s Public Domain) Associate Producer HELENA SAND; Produced and Directed by CARSON DAVIDSON - filmed prior to Closure of the South Ferry spur December 22, 1950.
