= City Hall station (IRT Second Avenue Line) =

Former Manhattan Railway elevated station (closed 1953)

City Hall
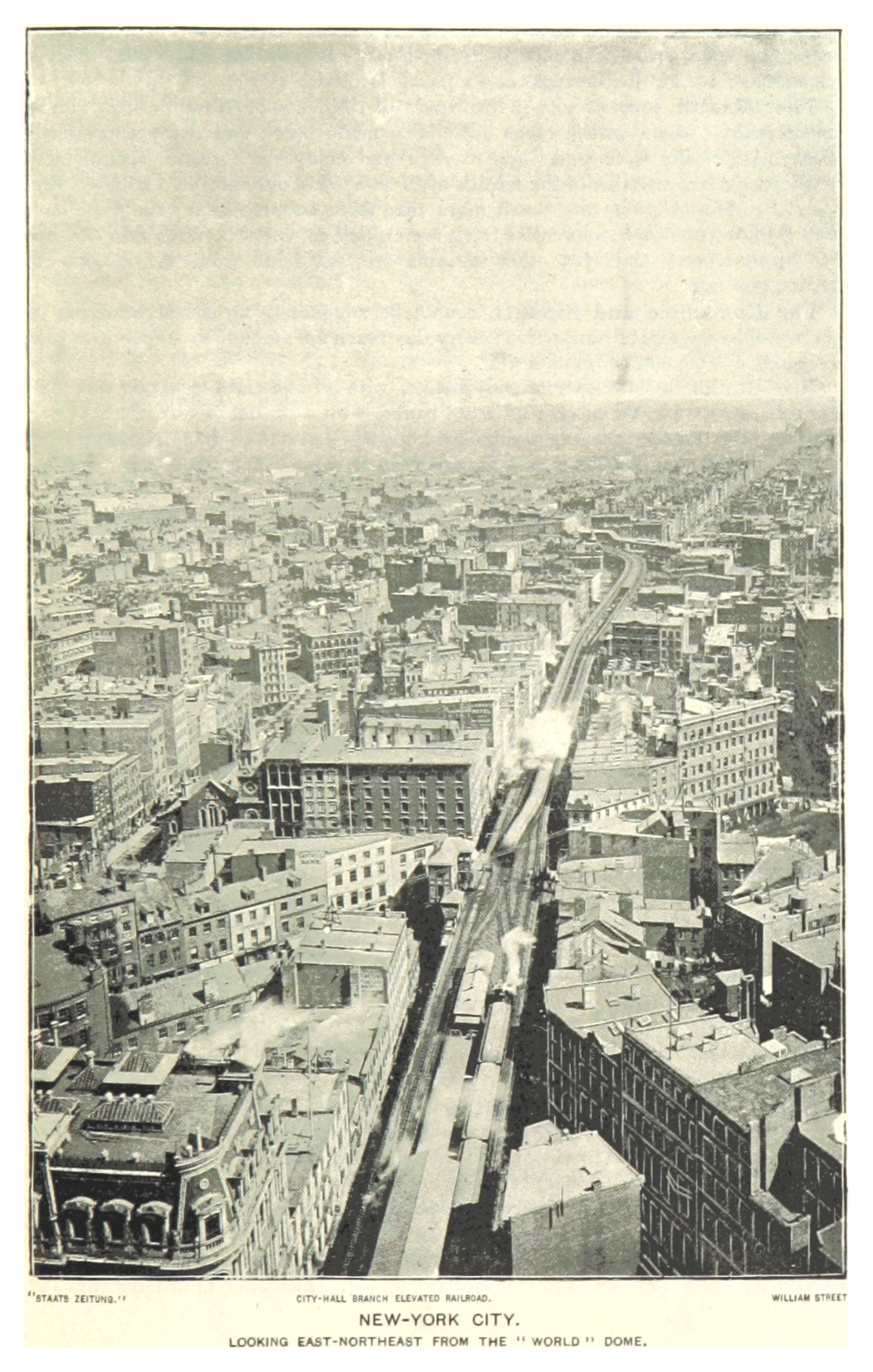
- As seen from the World Dome in the 1890s

General information
- Location: Lower Manhattan, Manhattan, New York
- Coordinates: 40°42′45″N 74°0′13.2″W
- System: Former Manhattan Railway elevated station
- Operator: Interborough Rapid Transit Company; City of New York (after 1940)
- Line: Second Avenue Line
- Platforms: 1 island platform, 2 side platforms (upper level); 1 island platform, 2 side platforms (lower level)
- Tracks: 4 (2 on each level)

Construction
- Structure type: Elevated

History
- Opened: March 17, 1879; 147 years ago
- Closed: June 13, 1942; 84 years ago (Upper Level 2nd Ave.); December 31, 1953; 72 years ago (Lower Level 3rd Ave.)

Former services
Preceding station	Interborough Rapid Transit	Following station
Chatham Square toward Bronx Park	Second Avenue Express	Terminus
Chatham Square toward Ditmars Boulevard	Second Avenue Queens	Terminus
Chatham Square toward Bronx Park	Third Avenue Local-Express	Terminus
Location

The City Hall station was a station on the IRT Second Avenue Line in Manhattan, New York City, which also served trains of the IRT Third Avenue Line. It lay along Park Row, south of the Manhattan Municipal Building, across the street from the BRT's Park Row Terminal. It had 2 levels. The lower level served Third Avenue trains and had two tracks with two side platforms for exiting passengers, and a center island platform for entering passengers. The upper level served Second Avenue trains and had two tracks and two side platforms for exiting passengers, and one island platform for entering passengers. Second Avenue trains served the station until June 13, 1942, and Third Avenue trains served the station until December 31, 1953. The next stop to the north was Chatham Square for all trains.
