= Bronx Park Terminal =

New York City Subway station in the Bronx (closed 1951)

- Former New York City Subway station

Station statistics
- Address: 198th Street near Southern Boulevard (near today's Prep Field); Bronx, New York 10458
- Borough: The Bronx
- Locale: Bedford Park, Bronx Park
- Coordinates: 40°51′59″N 73°53′6″W
- Division: A (IRT)
- Services: IRT Third Avenue Line; Botanical Garden Spur (1920–1951)
- Structure: Elevated
- Platforms: 1 island platform
- Tracks: 3

Other information
- Opened: May 21, 1902; 124 years ago
- Closed: November 14, 1951; 75 years ago

Station succession
- Next north: Terminus
- Next south: Fordham Road–190th Street
Location
Location within New York City Subway
Location within New York City
Location within New York
Street map
Station service legend
Symbol	Description
Stops all times	Stops in station at all times
Stops all times except late nights	Stops all times except late nights
Stops late nights only	Stops late nights only
Stops late nights and weekends	Stops late nights and weekends only
Stops weekdays during the day	Stops weekdays during the day
Stops weekends during the day	Stops weekends during the day
Stops all times except rush hours in the peak direction	Stops all times except rush hours in the peak direction
Stops all times except weekdays in the peak direction	Stops all times except weekdays in the peak direction
Stops daily except rush hours in the peak direction	Stops all times except nights and rush hours in the peak direction
Stops rush hours only	Stops rush hours only
Stops rush hours in the peak direction only	Stops rush hours in the peak direction only
Station closed	Station is closed
(Details about time periods)

Bronx Park Terminal was a terminal station on the demolished IRT Third Avenue Line in the Bedford Park neighborhood of the Bronx in New York City. The station was located adjacent to Bronx Park and the New York Botanical Garden at 198th Street between Webster Avenue and Southern Boulevard, in the approximate location of the modern Fordham Preparatory School. It was opened on May 21, 1902 and closed on November 14, 1951. The next southbound stop was Fordham Road–190th Street.

== History ==
The station was built as a one stop extension from Fordham Road–190th Street (then called Pelham Avenue) to provide direct service to Bronx Park, particularly the New York Botanical Garden. It was located on a 2,200 x 50 foot tract of land on the western edge of the campus of St. John's College (now the Rose Hill campus of Fordham University), purchased from the college by the Manhattan Railway Company. This characteristic was shared with much of Bronx Park, particularly the Bronx Zoo and Botanical Garden which were also built on former Fordham property.

The station was the northern terminal for all Third Avenue Line trains until an extension north of Fordham Road on a separate right-of-way along Webster Avenue to Gun Hill Road was completed on October 4, 1920, which included a station at nearby 200th Street (now Bedford Park Boulevard). Due to reduced patronage at the station, beginning in 1948 no service ran to or from Bronx Park between 7 p.m. and 7 a.m. The station was closed entirely in 1951, and the entire structure was demolished by 1952. Afterwards, the right-of-way of the stub line was re-purchased by Fordham University for $55,000.

== Station layout ==
The station had three tracks, the easternmost two of which were served by one island platform. The westernmost track had no platform and was used for storage. Following the extension of the line on Webster Avenue, Bronx Park became a stub-end station separate from the mainline. During this time, trains from Fordham Road either terminated at Bronx Park, or bypassed the station towards Gun Hill Road.

The station had a wide, covered wooden bridge across the tracks of the New York Central Railroad's New York and Harlem Railroad (now the Harlem Line of the Metro-North Railroad), permitting access to Fordham University and the New York Botanical Garden at Southern Blvd to the east, and to the Bedford Park neighborhood to the west.
