= Interborough Rapid Transit Company =

Defunct subway operator in New York City (1904–1940)

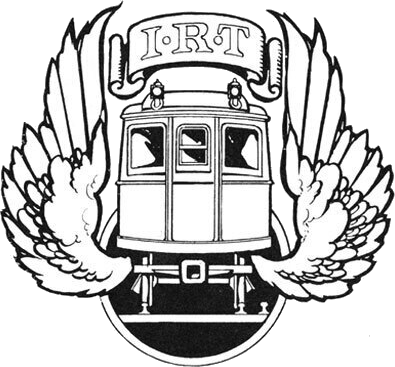

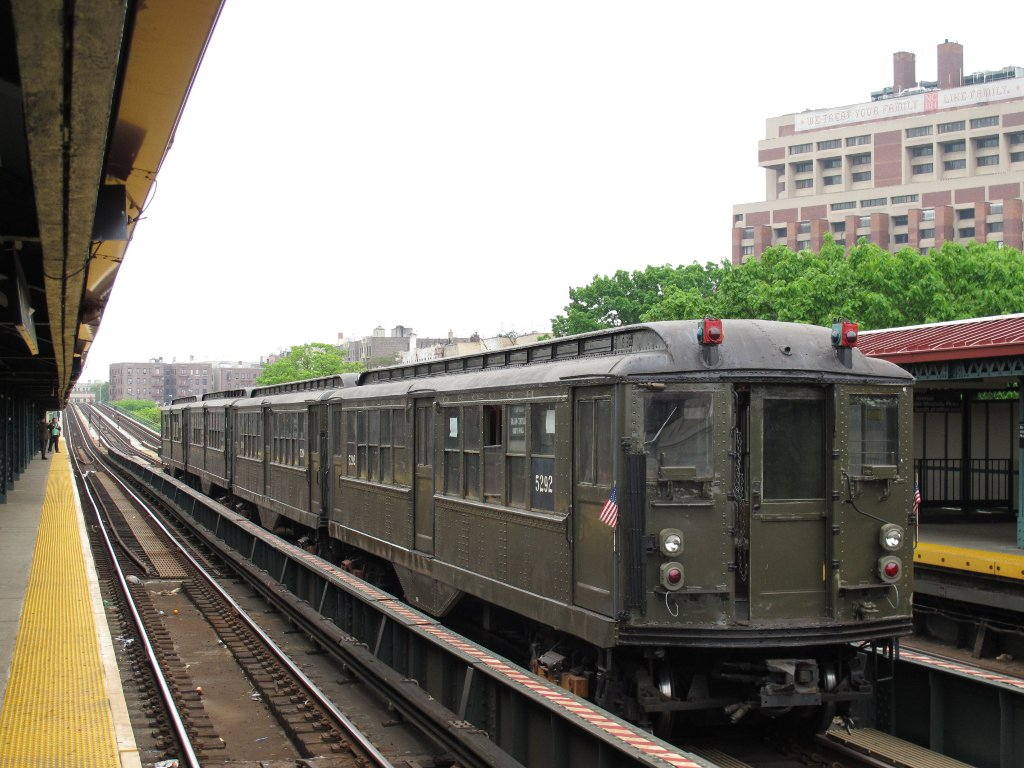
- A New York Transit Museum set of IRT Lo-Voltage motor cars at Mosholu Parkway station

Overview
- Status: Incorporated into the New York City Subway
- Owner: City of New York

Service
- Type: Underground and above-ground metro
- Operator: New York City Transit Authority
- Depot(s): 239th Street Yard, 240th Street Yard, Corona Yard, East 180th Street Yard, Jerome Yard, Livonia Yard, Westchester Yard
- Rolling stock: R62, R62A, R142, R142A, R188

History
- Opened: 1904; 122 years ago (acquisition of the Manhattan Railway Company)
- Closed: 1940; 86 years ago (acquisition by the NYC Board of Transportation)

Technical
- Track gauge: 4 ft 8 1/2 in (1,435 mm) standard gauge
- Minimum radius: 147.25 ft (44.88 m)
Route map
Map of the IRT system (1940 and prior)

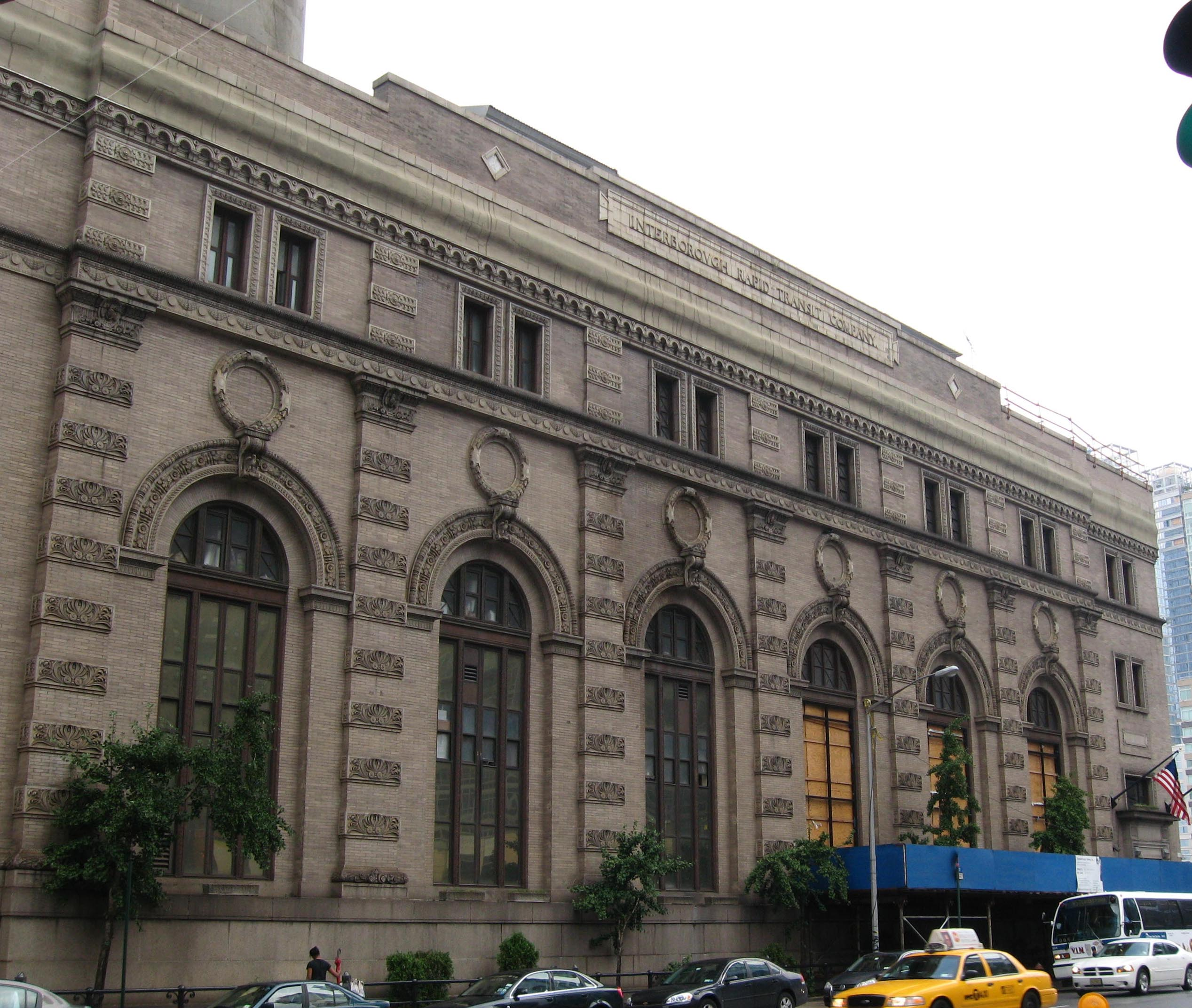
The IRT Powerhouse

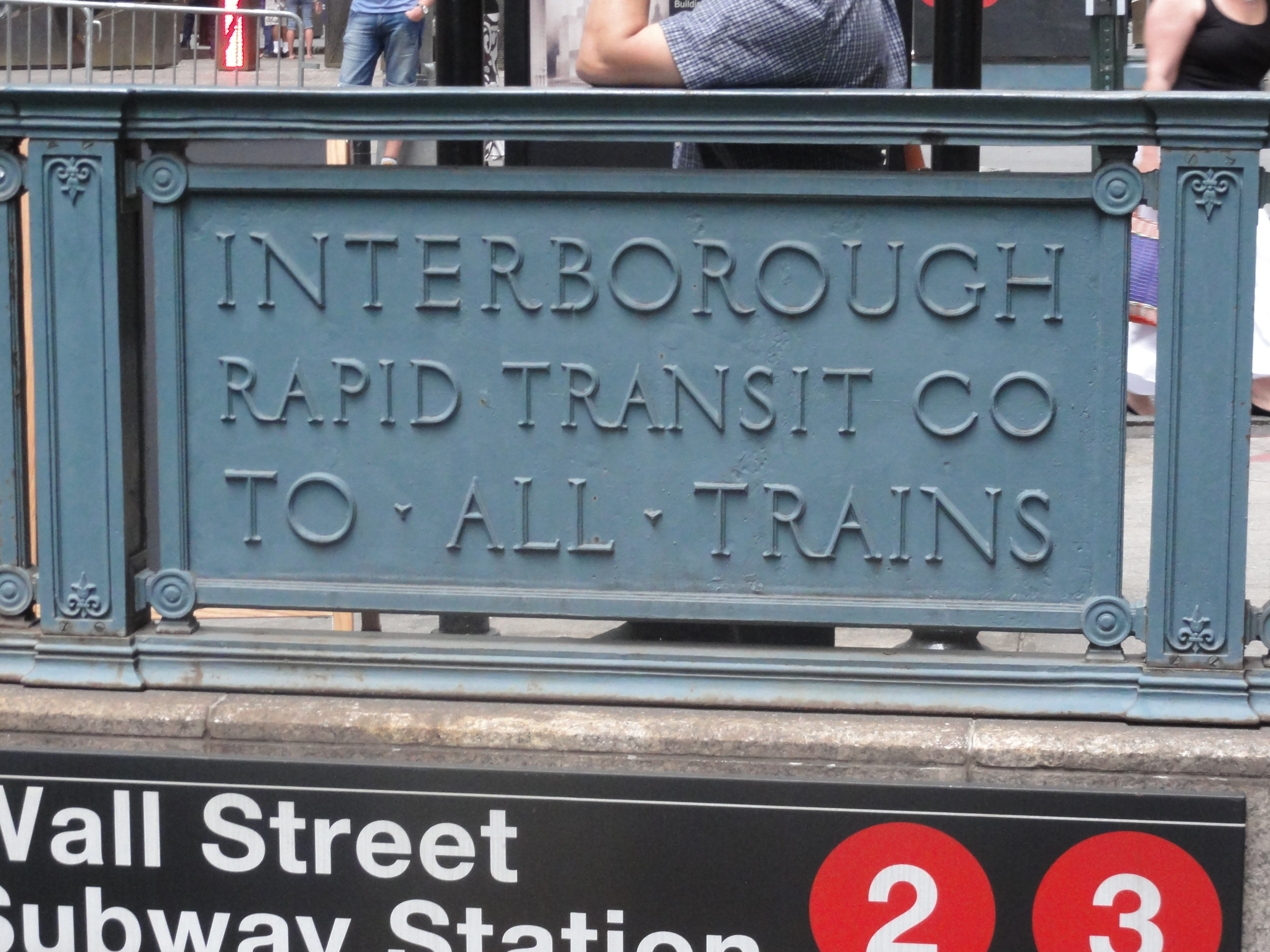
An old IRT sign remains at Wall Street station.

The Interborough Rapid Transit Company (IRT) was the private operator of New York City's original underground subway line that opened in 1904, as well as earlier elevated railways and additional rapid transit lines in New York City. The IRT was purchased by the city on June 12, 1940, along with the younger BMT and IND systems, to form the modern New York City Subway. The former IRT lines (the numbered routes in the current subway system) are now the A Division or IRT Division of the Subway.

== History ==
The first IRT subway ran between City Hall and 145th Street at Broadway, opening on October 27, 1904. It opened following more than twenty years of public debate on the merits of subways versus the existing elevated rail system and on various proposed routes.

Founded on May 6, 1902, by August Belmont, Jr., the IRT's mission was to operate New York City's initial underground rapid transit system after Belmont's and John B. McDonald's Rapid Transit Construction Company was awarded the rights to build the railway line in 1900, outbidding Andrew Onderdonk. The Manhattan Railway Company was the operator of four elevated railways in Manhattan with an extension into the Bronx.

On April 1, 1903, over a year before its first subway line opened, the IRT acquired the Manhattan Railway Company by lease, gaining a monopoly on rapid transit in Manhattan. The IRT coordinated some services between what became its subway and elevated divisions, but all the lines of the former Manhattan elevateds have since been dismantled.

In 1913, as a result of massive expansion in the city, the IRT signed the Dual Contracts with Brooklyn Rapid Transit (BRT) in order to expand the subway. The agreement also locked the subway fare at 5 cents for forty-nine years. The IRT unsuccessfully attempted to raise the fare to seven cents in 1929, in a case that went to the United States Supreme Court.

The IRT ceased to function as a privately held company on June 12, 1940, when its properties and operations were acquired by the City of New York.

Today, the IRT lines are operated as the A Division of the subway. The remaining lines are underground in Manhattan, except for a short stretch across Harlem at 125th Street and in northern Manhattan. Its many lines in the Bronx are predominantly elevated, with some subway, and some railroad-style right-of-way acquired from the defunct New York, Westchester and Boston Railway, which now constitutes the IRT Dyre Avenue Line. Its Brooklyn lines are underground with a single elevated extension that reaches up to New Lots Avenue, and the other reaching Flatbush Avenue via the underground Nostrand Avenue Line.

The Flushing Line, its sole line in Queens, is entirely elevated except for a short portion approaching its East River tunnel and its terminal at Flushing–Main Street (the whole Manhattan portion of the line is underground). The Flushing Line has had no track connection to the rest of the IRT since 1942, when service on the Second Avenue El was discontinued. It is connected to the BMT and the rest of the system via the BMT Astoria Line on the upper level of the Queensboro Plaza station.

== Lines ==
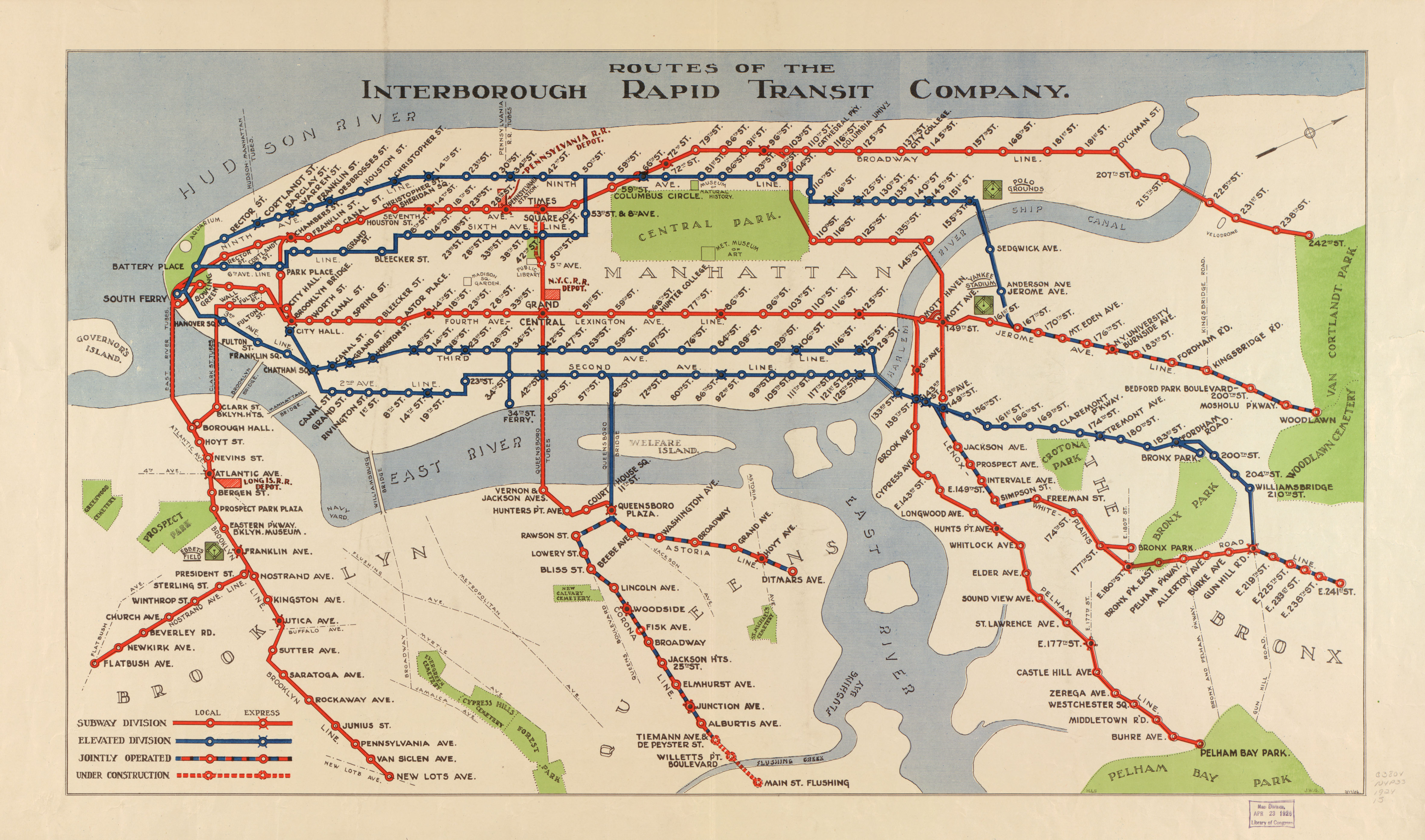
Routes of the Interborough Rapid Transit Company, 1924

=== Original IRT system (1904–1909) ===
==== Subway Division ====
- West Branch
  - Broadway Line (Atlantic Avenue to 242nd Street, with intermediate terminals at South Ferry and City Hall)
- East Branch
  - Lenox Avenue Line (Atlantic Avenue to 145th Street, with intermediate terminals at South Ferry and City Hall)
  - Westchester Avenue Branch (135th Street to 180th Street)

==== Manhattan Railway Division ====
- Eastern Division
  - Second Avenue Line (South Ferry to 129th Street)
  - Third Avenue Line (South Ferry to Bronx Park Terminal)
  - City Hall Branch (City Hall to Chatham Square)
  - 34th Street Branch (Third Avenue to 34th Street Ferry)
  - 42nd Street Branch (42nd Street to Grand Central)
  - Willis Avenue Branch (129th Street to Willis Avenue)
- Western Division
  - Sixth Avenue Line (South Ferry to 155th Street, with an intermediate terminal at 58th Street)
  - Ninth Avenue Line (South Ferry to 155th Street)

=== Expansion (1917–1928) ===
==== The Bronx and Manhattan ====
Trunk lines include:

- Lexington Avenue Line (4 5 6 <6> trains), under Park and Lexington Avenues, as well as under Lafayette Street and Broadway
- Broadway–Seventh Avenue Line (1 2 3 trains), under and over Broadway, as well as under Seventh Avenue, Varick Street, and West Broadway
- Flushing Line (7 <7> trains), under 41st and 42nd Streets
- 42nd Street Line (S train), under 42nd Street

Branch lines include:

- Lenox Avenue Line (2 3 trains), under Lenox Avenue and Central Park
- White Plains Road Line (2 5 trains), under East 149th Street, and over Westchester Avenue, Southern Boulevard, Boston Road, and White Plains Road
- Pelham Line (6 <6> trains), under East 138th Street and Southern Boulevard, and over Westchester Avenue
- Jerome Avenue Line (4 train), under Grand Concourse, over River and Jerome Avenues,

==== Brooklyn and Queens ====
There were three Brooklyn lines built by the IRT:

- Eastern Parkway Line (2 3 4 5 trains), under Fulton Street, Flatbush Avenue, and Eastern Parkway
- New Lots Line (2 3 4 5 trains), over East 98th Street and Livonia Avenue
- Nostrand Avenue Line (2 5 trains), under Nostrand Avenue

The only line in Queens is the Flushing Line (7 <7> trains), under 50th Avenue, and over Queens Boulevard and Roosevelt Avenue.

==== River crossings ====
(of the East and Harlem Rivers, from south to north)

- Joralemon Street Tunnel (4 5 trains)
- Clark Street Tunnel (2 3 trains)
- Steinway Tunnel (7 <7> trains)
- Lexington Avenue Tunnel (4 5 6 <6> trains)
- 149th Street Tunnel (2 train)
- Broadway Bridge (1 train)

=== After 1940 ===
- Dyre Avenue Line (5 train), parallel to the Esplanade, and on the old right-of-way of the New York, Westchester and Boston Railway in 1941
- Flushing Line, in October 1949, the joint BMT/IRT service arrangement ended. The Flushing Line became the responsibility of IRT. The Astoria Line had its platforms shaved back for exclusive BMT operation.
- Lenox Avenue Line to Harlem–148th Street (2 3 trains), at-grade parallel to 149th Street in 1968
- Broadway–Seventh Avenue Line to new South Ferry island-platformed stations, opened in March 2009. It closed temporarily from October 28, 2012, to June 27, 2017, because of Hurricane Sandy.
- Flushing Line to 34th Street–Hudson Yards (7 and <7> trains), under 41st Street and 11th Avenue, opened in September 2015

== Surviving IRT equipment ==
Several pieces of pre-unification IRT equipment have been preserved in various museums. While some of the equipment are operational, others are in need of restoration or are used simply as static displays.

- Manhattan El revenue collection car G is preserved at the Shore Line Trolley Museum.
- IRT elevated motorman instruction car 824 is preserved at the Shore Line Trolley Museum.
- Richmond Shipyard Railway cars 561 and 563 (ex-Manhattan El cars 844 and 889) are preserved at the Western Railway Museum in Rio Vista, California.
- The private car of August Belmont Jr., numbered 3344 and named the Mineola, is preserved at the Shore Line Trolley Museum.
- Gibbs car 3352 is preserved at the Seashore Trolley Museum.
- Deck Roof car 3662 is preserved at the Shore Line Trolley Museum.
- Lo-V cars 4902, 5290, 5292, 5443, 5466, 5483 and 5600 have been preserved. Cars 4902, 5290, 5292, 5442 and 5483 are preserved by the New York Transit Museum and Railway Preservation Corp. Car 5466 is preserved at the Shore Line Trolley Museum. Car 5600 is preserved at the Trolley Museum of New York.
- World's Fair Lo-V car 5655 is preserved by the New York Transit Museum.

== See also ==
Other NYC Subway companies:

- Brooklyn–Manhattan Transit Corporation (BMT)
- Brooklyn Rapid Transit Company (BRT)
- Independent Subway System (ISS)

Also:

- History of the IRT subway before 1918
- New York IRT—Soccer team sponsored by IRT
- IRT Rangers—Soccer team sponsored by IRT
