= Franklin Historic District =

Franklin Historic District or variations with Boulevard, Commercial, Square, and Village, may refer to:

- Franklin Square Historic District (Bloomington, Illinois), listed on the National Register of Historic Places (NRHP)
- Franklin Commercial Historic District, Franklin, Indiana, NRHP-listed in Indiana
- Franklin Downtown Commercial District, Franklin, Kentucky, NRHP-listed in Simpson County
- Franklin Historic District (Franklin, Louisiana), NRHP-listed
- Franklin Square Historic District (Baltimore, Maryland), NRHP-listed
- Franklin Common Historic District, Franklin, Massachusetts, NRHP-listed
- Franklin Historic District (Franklin, Michigan), NRHP-listed
- Franklin Boulevard Historic District (Pontiac, Michigan), NRHP-listed
- Franklin Falls Historic District, Franklin, New Hampshire, NRHP-listed
- Franklin Corners Historic District, Franklin Corners, New Jersey, NRHP-listed
- Franklin Village Historic District, Franklin, New York, NRHP-listed
- Franklin Square Historic District (Oswego, New York), NRHP-listed in Oswego County
- Franklin Square Historic District, now included in West Side Historic District (Saratoga Springs, New York), NRHP-listed
- Franklin Boulevard Historic District (Cleveland, Ohio), listed on the NRHP in Ohio
- Franklin Boulevard-West Clinton Avenue Historic District, Cleveland, Ohio, listed on the NRHP in Ohio
- Franklin Furnace Historic District, Edenville, Pennsylvania, NRHP-listed
- Franklin Historic District (Franklin, Pennsylvania), NRHP-listed
- Franklin Historic District (Franklin, Tennessee), NRHP-listed
- Franklin Historic District (Franklin, Virginia), NRHP-listed
- Franklin Historic District (Franklin, West Virginia), NRHP-listed
