= Franklin Square Historic District =

Franklin Square Historic District may refer to:

- Franklin Square Historic District (Bloomington, Illinois), listed on the NRHP in Illinois
- Franklin Square Historic District (Baltimore, Maryland), listed on the NRHP in Maryland
- Franklin Square Historic District (Oswego, New York), listed on the NRHP in New York
- Franklin Square Historic District, now included in West Side Historic District (Saratoga Springs, New York), listed on the NRHP in New York

== See also ==
- Franklin Square (disambiguation)
- Franklin Historic District (disambiguation)
