= Franklin Square =

Franklin Square may refer to:

== Australia ==
- Franklin Square (Hobart), in Hobart, Tasmania, Australia

== United States ==
- Franklin Square (Bloomington, Illinois), listed on the NRHP in McLean County, Illinois
- Franklin Square Historic District (Baltimore, Maryland), a park in Baltimore, Maryland
- Franklin Square Hospital Center, a hospital in Rossville, Maryland
- Franklin and Blackstone Squares in Boston, Massachusetts
- Franklin Place in Boston, Massachusetts
- Franklin Square (Manhattan), a former square in Lower Manhattan, demolished in 1950
- Franklin Square, New York, a hamlet in Nassau County, New York
- Franklin Square, Ohio, an unincorporated community
- Franklin Square (Savannah, Georgia)
- Franklin Square, Syracuse, a neighborhood and square in Syracuse, New York
- Franklin Square (Philadelphia), one of the five main squares in Philadelphia, Pennsylvania
- Franklin Square (PATCO station), a train station in Philadelphia, Pennsylvania
- Franklin Square (Washington, D.C.)
- Franklin Square (IRT Third Avenue Line), a station on the IRT Third Avenue Line in New York City
- Franklin Square in Worcester, Massachusetts, also known as Federal Square

== See also ==
- Franklin Square Historic District (disambiguation)
