= Hanover Square station =

Former Manhattan Railway elevated station (closed 1950)

Hanover Square
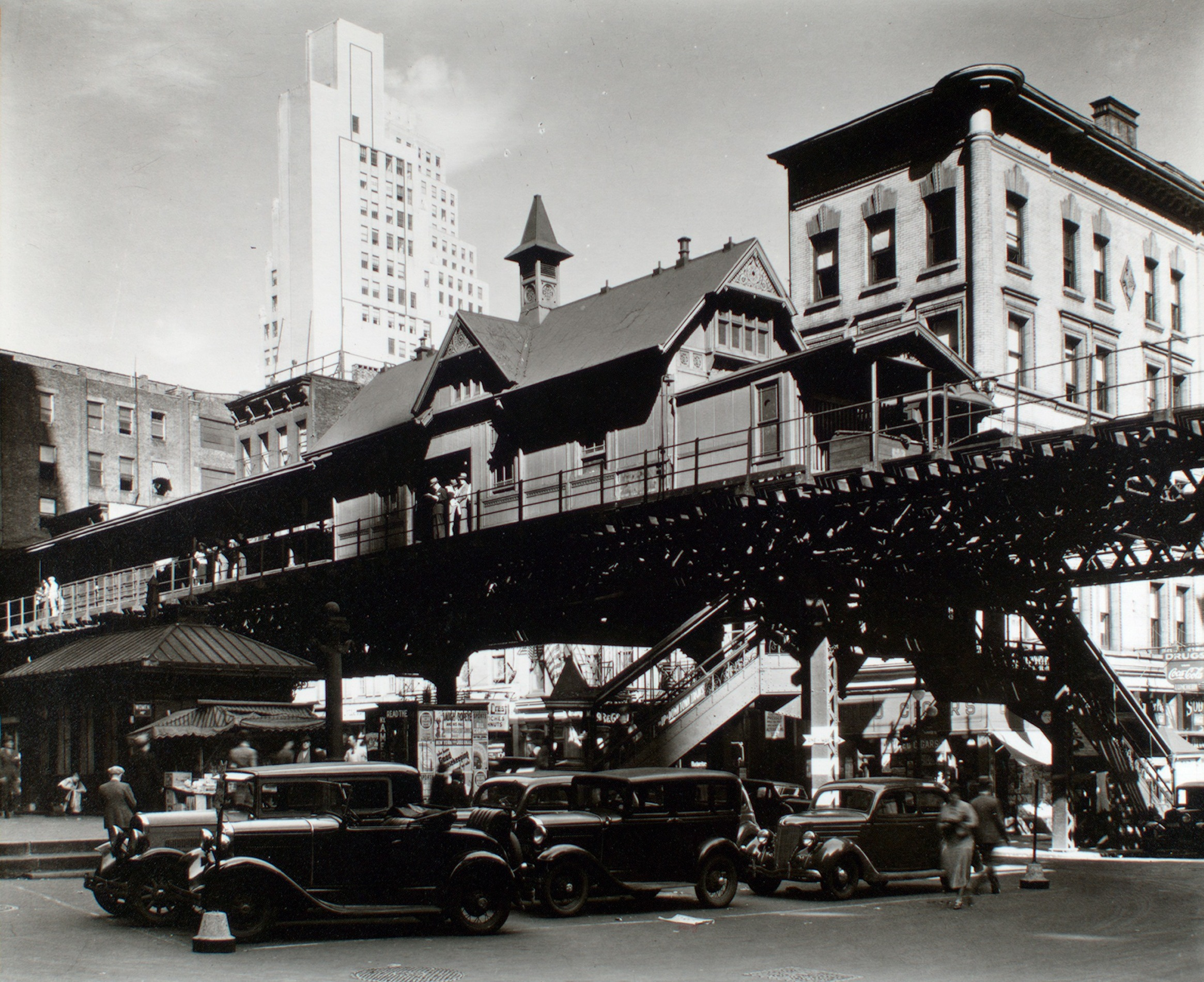
- Hanover Square station, 1936

General information
- Location: Pearl Street and Hanover Square; Lower Manhattan, Manhattan, New York
- Coordinates: 40°42′16.78″N 74°0′33.36″W
- System: Former Manhattan Railway elevated station
- Operator: Interborough Rapid Transit Company; City of New York (after 1940)
- Line: Third Avenue Line
- Platforms: 1 island platform
- Tracks: 2

Construction
- Structure type: Elevated

History
- Opened: August 26, 1878; 148 years ago
- Closed: December 22, 1950; 75 years ago

Former services
Preceding station	Interborough Rapid Transit	Following station
Fulton Street toward 129th Street	Second Avenue Local	South Ferry Terminus
Fulton Street toward 129th Street	Third Avenue Local	South Ferry Terminus
Location

The Hanover Square station was an express station on the demolished IRT Third Avenue Line in Manhattan, New York City. It had two tracks and one island platform. The station was originally built in 1878 by the New York Elevated Railroad. The next stop to the north was Fulton Street. The next stop to the south was South Ferry. The station closed on December 22, 1950. There is a proposed station with the same name part of the phase 4 of the Second Avenue Subway.

== In popular culture ==
Hanover Square station is immortalised in the last movement of Orchestral Set No. 2 by Charles Ives, a recollection of the day the news broke that the liner the Lusitania had been sunk in 1915.
