= Fulton Street station (IRT Third Avenue Line) =

Former Manhattan Railway elevated station (closed 1950)

Fulton St.

General information
- Location: Fulton Street and Pearl Street; Lower Manhattan, Manhattan, New York
- Coordinates: 40°42′28.04″N 74°0′15.81″W
- System: Former Manhattan Railway elevated station
- Operator: Interborough Rapid Transit Company; City of New York (after 1940)
- Line: Third Avenue Line
- Platforms: 1 island platform
- Tracks: 2

Construction
- Structure type: Elevated

History
- Opened: August 26, 1878; 147 years ago
- Closed: December 22, 1950; 75 years ago

Other services
Preceding station	Interborough Rapid Transit	Following station
Franklin Square toward 129th Street	Second Avenue Local	Hanover Square toward South Ferry
Franklin Square toward 129th Street	Third Avenue Local	Hanover Square toward South Ferry
Location

The Fulton Street station was an express station on the demolished IRT Third Avenue Line in Manhattan, New York City. The station was originally built in 1878 by the New York Elevated Railroad and had two tracks and one island platform. The next stop to the north was Franklin Square. The next stop to the south was Hanover Square. The station closed on December 22, 1950. The site of the former station is located in a playground across from the Titanic Memorial Park.
