= Orchestral Set No. 2 =

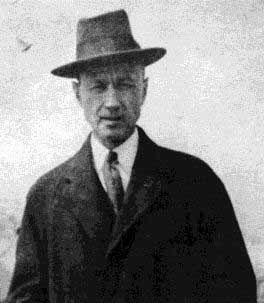
Charles Ives in 1913

Orchestral Set No. 2 is the title of a three-movement work by the American composer Charles Ives. A typical performance lasts around seventeen minutes. Composed between 1915 and 1919, it represents musical reminiscences of the composer. Like its predecessor, the First Orchestral Set, Three Places in New England, it was not conceived as a single entity but rather assembled from separate compositions.

== Structure ==
The opening movement, named An Elegy to Our Forefathers, is the most esoteric of the recollections. Ives had originally entitled it as an elegy to Stephen Foster, but its fleeting, indistinct nature—it fades in and out of view (like a passing parade) perhaps suggested to Ives something less specific than a named individual. As Ives biographer Jan Swafford puts it, it "is like a memory of Stephen Foster tunes."

The second movement is more lively. Entitled The Rockstrewn Hills Join in the People’s Outdoor Meeting, it is instantly recognisable as Ives, recalling the camp-revival meetings he knew as a boy. This movement contains particularly demanding passages for piano, and Ives himself referred to it as "almost a piano concerto."

The final movement From Hanover Square North, At the End of a Tragic Day, The Voice of the People Again Arose, recalls Ives's experience of May 7, 1915, the day that the news broke of the sinking of the RMS Lusitania, preceding the United States' entry into the First World War. Ives's focus, however, as Clayton Henderson notes, is not about the sinking per se, but rather "the reaction of a group of commuters". According to his own memoirs, the crowd waiting on the platform of New York's Hanover Square station spontaneously broke into the gospel hymn In the Sweet By and By – a tune that was being played on a barrel organ on the street below. He stated:

Some workmen sitting on the side of the tracks began to whistle the tune, and others began to sing or hum the refrain. A workman with a shovel over his shoulder came on to the platform and joined in the chorus, and the next man, a Wall Street banker with white spats and a cane, joined in it, finally it seemed to me that everybody was singing this tune, and they didn't seem to be singing it in fun, but as a natural outlet for what their feelings had been going through all day long.

The movement begins with an offstage chorus singing an extract from the Te Deum in English ("We praise thee, O God; we acknowledge thee to be the Lord"). From there the music develops with melodies overlaying one another, including Foster's Massa's in the Cold Ground and My Old Kentucky Home. These fade in and out of view, with In the Sweet By and By circulating around the music, never explicitly quoted. Only at the climax, when Ives depicts the crowd's impromptu singing, does the orchestra unequivocally state the hymn—or rather a representation of it in the unrehearsed, completely sincere form Ives recollected from that day.

== Performances and recordings ==
The Chicago Symphony Orchestra and Chorus gave the world premiere performance on February 11, 1967, with Morton Gould conducting in Orchestra Hall; the same forces made the first recording the following week on February 15 in Chicago's Medinah Temple for RCA Records. The second performance of the work was also its European premiere. It was given by the London Symphony Orchestra and Chorus under the direction of Leopold Stokowski on June 18, 1970 in London's Royal Festival Hall and repeated at the Fairfield Hall, Croydon on June 20, 1970. The same forces recorded the work on June 22/23, 1970 in Kingsway Hall, London for Decca/London Records in 'Phase-4 Stereo'. Additional recordings have been made by several ensembles, including the Concertgebouw Orchestra under Michael Tilson Thomas, the Cleveland Orchestra under Christoph von Dohnányi and more recently as part of a series of critical edition performances by the Malmö Symphony Orchestra under Ives scholar James Sinclair.
