= Franklin, Michigan =

- Village
- Village of Franklin
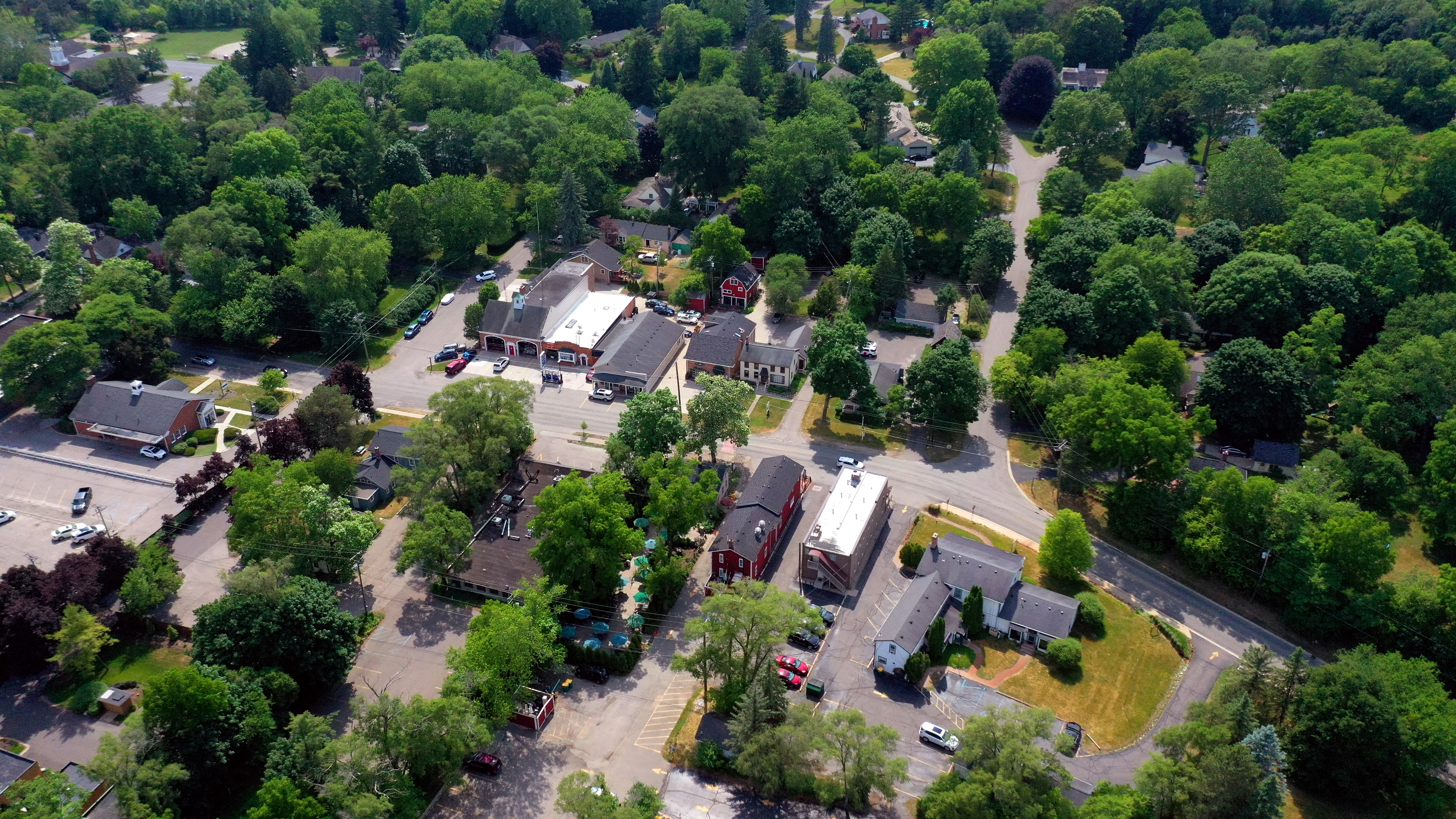
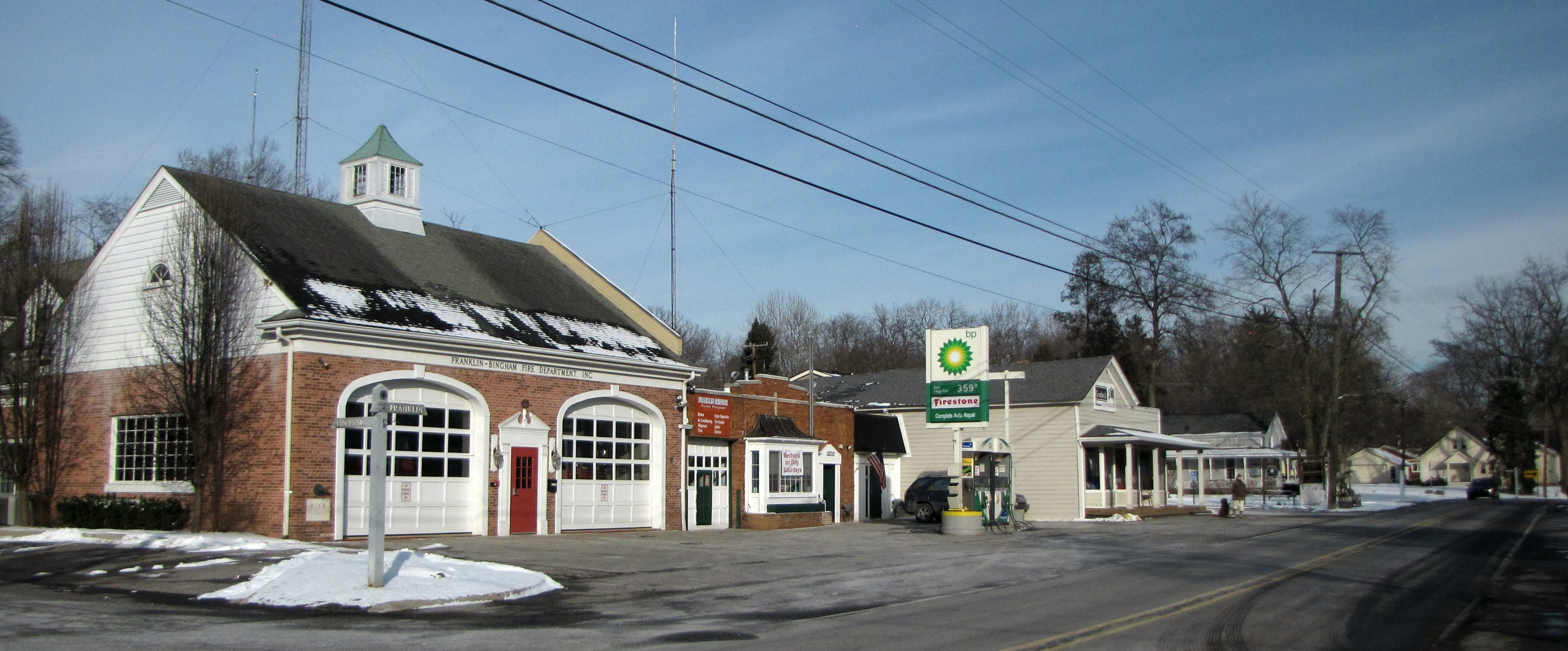
- Top-to-bottom: Downtown Franklin (2022), Franklin–Bingham Fire Department in (2013)
- Motto: "Experience It"
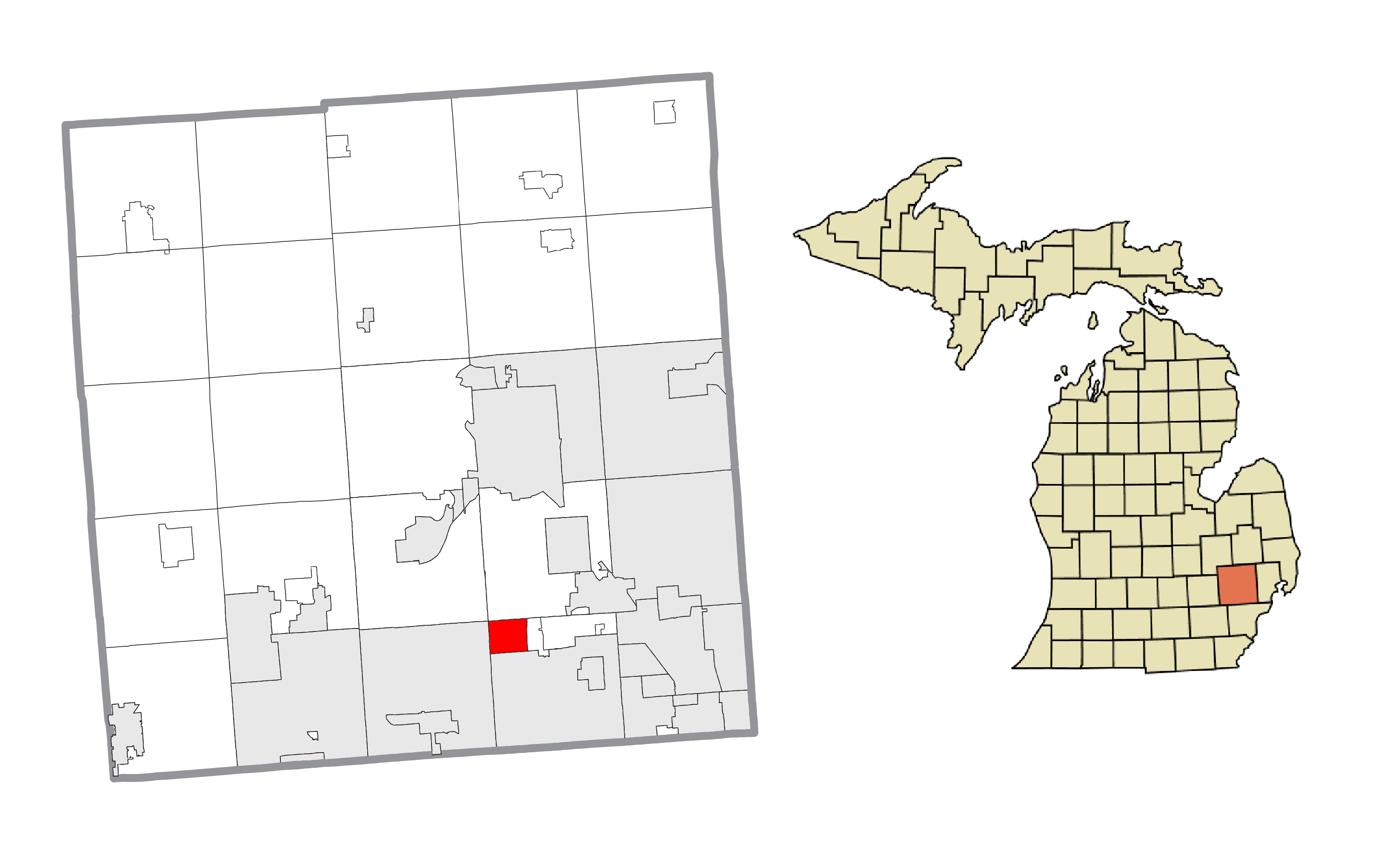
- Location within Oakland County

- Location within the state of Michigan
- Coordinates: 42°31′12″N 83°18′14″W
- Country: United States
- State: Michigan
- County: Oakland
- Township: Southfield
- Incorporated: 1953

Government
  - President: David Goldberg

Area
  - Village: 2.66 sq mi (6.90 km^{2})
  - Land: 2.66 sq mi (6.90 km^{2})
  - Water: 0 sq mi (0.00 km^{2})
- Elevation: 833 ft (254 m)

Population (2020)
  - Village: 3,139
  - Density: 1,178.7/sq mi (455.08/km^{2})
  - Metro: 4,296,250 (Metro Detroit)
- Time zone: UTC-5 (Eastern (EST))
  - Summer (DST): UTC-4 (EDT)
- ZIP code(s): 48025
- Area code: 248
- FIPS code: 26-30340
- GNIS feature ID: 0626409
- Website: Official website

Franklin is a village in Oakland County in the U.S. state of Michigan. A northern suburb of Detroit, Franklin is located within Southfield Township, roughly 20 miles (32.2 km) northwest of downtown Detroit. As of the 2020 census, the village had a population of 3,139.

The community is known for large, estate-style homes. The downtown was designated as a historic district, the first in Michigan, and listed on the National Register of Historic Places in 1969. The Franklin Cider Mill is a visitor attraction.

== History ==
The community was founded in 1825 by Elijah Bullock and other European-American settlers; it was named after Benjamin Franklin, a Founding Father of the United States, in 1831. By 1830, a business district formed. The village has a unique collection of historical structures in original condition that is unusual for suburban Detroit. The village was incorporated in 1953.

=== Historical markers ===
In 1960 a historical marker was erected that reads:

FRANKLIN VILLAGE Founded in 1824–1825, Franklin received its present name in 1828. First postmaster was Dr. Ebenezer Raynale, state legislator and physician. The William Huston store, opened in 1830, was the forerunner of a business center that later included the famous Broughton Wagon Shop, the Van Every Mills, now Ye Olde Cider Mill; several taverns, two distilleries, and two churches. The village also was a station on the Underground Railroad. Franklin still has the appearance and atmosphere of an early Michigan village.

Another marker was installed in front of Franklin Village School:

Franklin Village School – Michigan's Territorial Council passed a law in 1827 requiring every township with fifty or more inhabitants to establish a school. Thus the following year, the first school in Southfield Township was erected in Franklin Village. Sophie Gotie taught twenty-nine students in a log schoolhouse located near the still extant house of early settler Daniel Broughton. Franklin village built a new school in 1845 at the foot of School Hill on property deeded by Winthrop Worthings. On this site in 1869 a third school was constructed on land given by wealthy postmaster A.A. Rust. After that building burned in 1922, the village erected the present school on this same location. The Franklin School District No. 3, Southfield Township, joined the Birmingham Public Schools in 1945.

This building closed as a public school in 1979. In 1988, members of Metro Detroit's Muslim community bought the building and adapted it as Huda School and Montessori, a K-8 Islamic parochial school. On Saturdays the building houses the related Dar-al-Huda Islamic Saturday school.

In 2006, the Muslim community raised $3.6 million (~$5.37 million in 2024) to fund renovation and expansion of the school. In the summer of 2007, the Monahan Construction Company renovated the school. In September 2007, the community raised another $1 million to continue the project's second phase, which was completed in 2008. Franklin also the hometown Farmbrook Free Press, a small publication.

== Geography ==
According to the United States Census Bureau, the village has a total area of 2.66 square miles (6.89 km^{2}), all land.

== Government ==
=== Federal, state, and county legislators ===
United States House of Representatives
District	Representative	Party	Since
12th	Rashida Tlaib	Democratic	2023

Michigan Senate
District	Senator	Party	Since
7th	Jeremy Moss	Democratic	2023

Michigan House of Representatives
District	Representative	Party	Since
19th	Samantha Steckloff	Democratic	2023

Oakland County Board of Commissioners
District	Commissioner	Party	Since
18	Linnie Taylor	Democratic	2023

== Demographics ==
Historical population
Census	Pop.	Note	%±
1880	151		—
1960	2,262		—
1970	3,311		46.4%
1980	2,864		−13.5%
1990	2,626		−8.3%
2000	2,937		11.8%
2010	3,150		7.3%
2020	3,139		−0.3%
U.S. Decennial Census

=== 2020 census ===
As of the 2020 census, Franklin had a population of 3,139. The median age was 47.1 years. 22.3% of residents were under the age of 18 and 20.2% of residents were 65 years of age or older. For every 100 females there were 99.2 males, and for every 100 females age 18 and over there were 94.6 males age 18 and over.

100.0% of residents lived in urban areas, while 0.0% lived in rural areas.

There were 1,130 households in Franklin, of which 37.3% had children under the age of 18 living in them. Of all households, 73.4% were married-couple households, 8.2% were households with a male householder and no spouse or partner present, and 14.9% were households with a female householder and no spouse or partner present. About 13.6% of all households were made up of individuals and 9.1% had someone living alone who was 65 years of age or older.

There were 1,187 housing units, of which 4.8% were vacant. The homeowner vacancy rate was 1.2% and the rental vacancy rate was 2.0%.

Racial composition as of the 2020 census
Race	Number	Percent
White	2,531	80.6%
Black or African American	191	6.1%
American Indian and Alaska Native	3	0.1%
Asian	206	6.6%
Native Hawaiian and Other Pacific Islander	0	0.0%
Some other race	27	0.9%
Two or more races	181	5.8%
Hispanic or Latino (of any race)	96	3.1%

=== 2010 census ===
As of the census of 2010, there were 3,150 people, 1,118 households, and 903 families living in the village. The population density was 1,184.2 inhabitants per square mile (457.2/km^{2}). There were 1,177 housing units at an average density of 442.5 per square mile (170.9/km^{2}). The racial makeup of the village was 86.2% White, 6.6% African American, 0.1% Native American, 4.8% Asian, 0.1% Pacific Islander, 0.5% from other races, and 1.7% from two or more races. Hispanic or Latino of any race were 1.3% of the population.

There were 1,118 households, of which 39.2% had children under the age of 18 living with them, 74.1% were married couples living together, 4.3% had a female householder with no husband present, 2.4% had a male householder with no wife present, and 19.2% were non-families. 15.7% of all households were made up of individuals, and 8% had someone living alone who was 65 years of age or older. The average household size was 2.82 and the average family size was 3.17.

The median age in the village was 45.4 years. 28.4% of residents were under the age of 18; 4.7% were between the ages of 18 and 24; 16.5% were from 25 to 44; 34.4% were from 45 to 64; and 16.2% were 65 years of age or older. The gender makeup of the village was 50.5% male and 49.5% female.

=== 2000 census ===
As of the census of 2000, there were 2,937 people, 1,073 households, and 866 families living in the village. The population density was 1,105.5 inhabitants per square mile (426.8/km^{2}). There were 1,118 housing units at an average density of 420.8 per square mile (162.5/km^{2}). The racial makeup of the village was 89.79% White, 5.07% African American, 0.10% Native American, 3.58% Asian, 0.34% from other races, and 1.12% from two or more races. Hispanic or Latino of any race were 0.85% of the population.

There were 1,073 households, out of which 38.2% had children under the age of 18 living with them, 75.3% were married couples living together, 3.7% had a female householder with no husband present, and 19.2% were non-families. 15.0% of all households were made up of individuals, and 7.0% had someone living alone who was 65 years of age or older. The average household size was 2.73 and the average family size was 3.06.

In the village, the population was spread out, with 28.3% under the age of 18, 2.9% from 18 to 24, 25.6% from 25 to 44, 29.5% from 45 to 64, and 13.8% who were 65 years of age or older. The median age was 42 years. For every 100 females, there were 105.8 males. For every 100 females age 18 and over, there were 99.3 males.

The median income for a household in the village was $124,014, and the median income for a family was $139,339. Males had a median income of $100,000 versus $61,500 for females. The per capita income for the village was $71,033. About 0.5% of families and 1.0% of the population were below the poverty line, including 0.4% of those under age 18 and 1.0% of those age 65 or over.

== Arts and culture ==
=== Points of interest ===
Franklin is known for the Franklin Cider Mill, just north of the village's borders in neighboring Bloomfield Township. The Franklin Cider Mill was established as a gristmill in 1837, the year Michigan became a state. It was converted to a cider mill in 1949.

Franklin's current firehouse was built in 1959. The village employs one firefighter and a chief; the rest of the force is volunteer. The station was built on the site of the former community hall, which burned down in 1958.

Because of its many original mid-19th century properties, Franklin was designated as Michigan's first historic district on November 11, 1969, and listed on the National Register of Historic Places that year. The boundaries of the district have been expanded to include more contributing properties.

== Notable people ==
- Max Fisher, businessman, died at his home in Franklin
- Ashley Johnson, actress and voice actress, spent part of her childhood in Franklin
- Jeff Katz, film producer and comic book author, grew up in Franklin
