= Franklin Cider Mill =

Cider mill in Michigan

Coordinates: 42°31′49″N 83°18′19″W

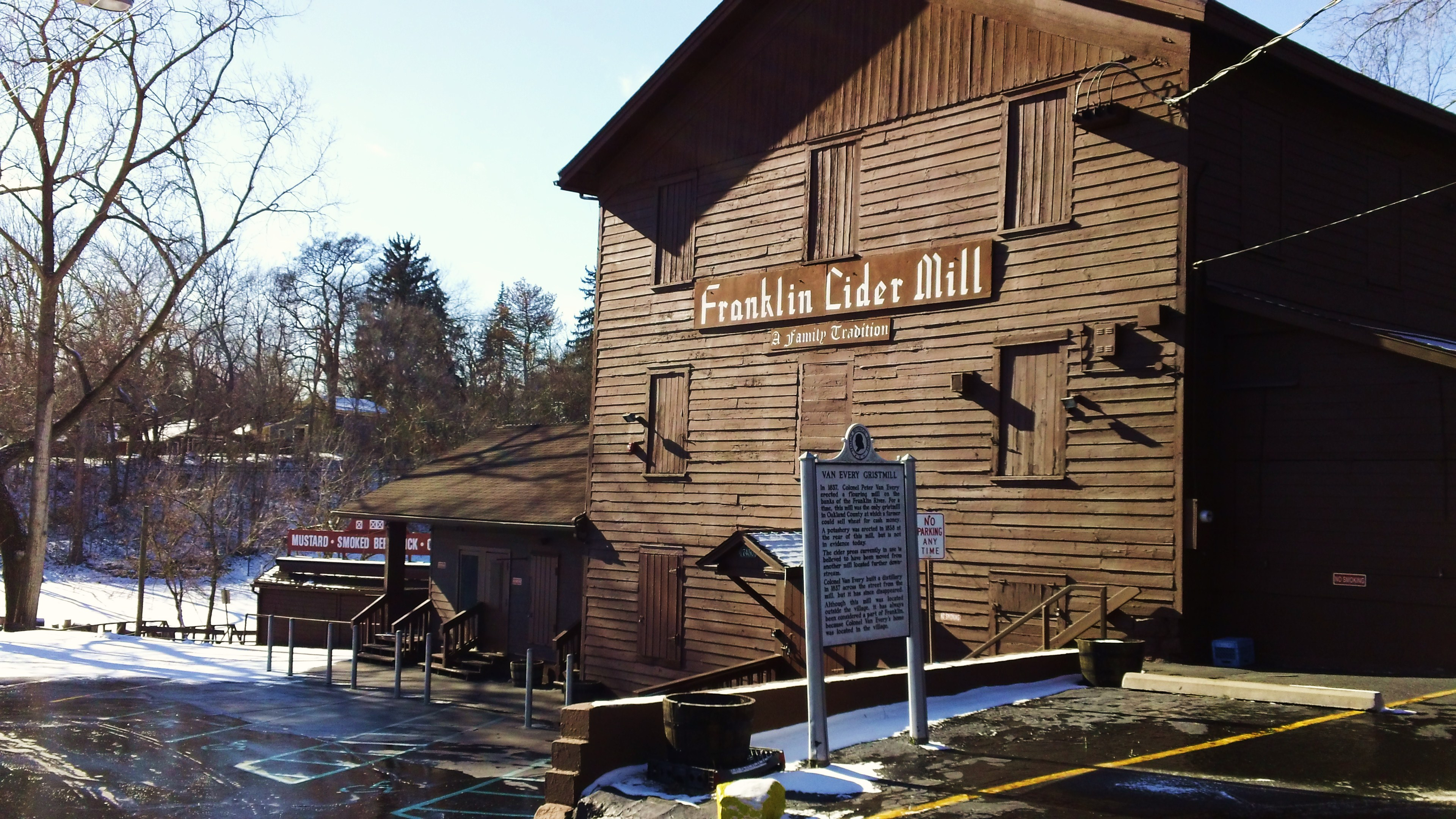
The Franklin Cider Mill

The Franklin Cider Mill, known previously as the Franklin Grist Mill, is a cider mill located in Franklin, Michigan.

The family of former owner Jacob Peltz continues to operate the mill. The mill offers fresh apple cider, spice donuts, caramel apples, and apple pies and other products.

== History ==
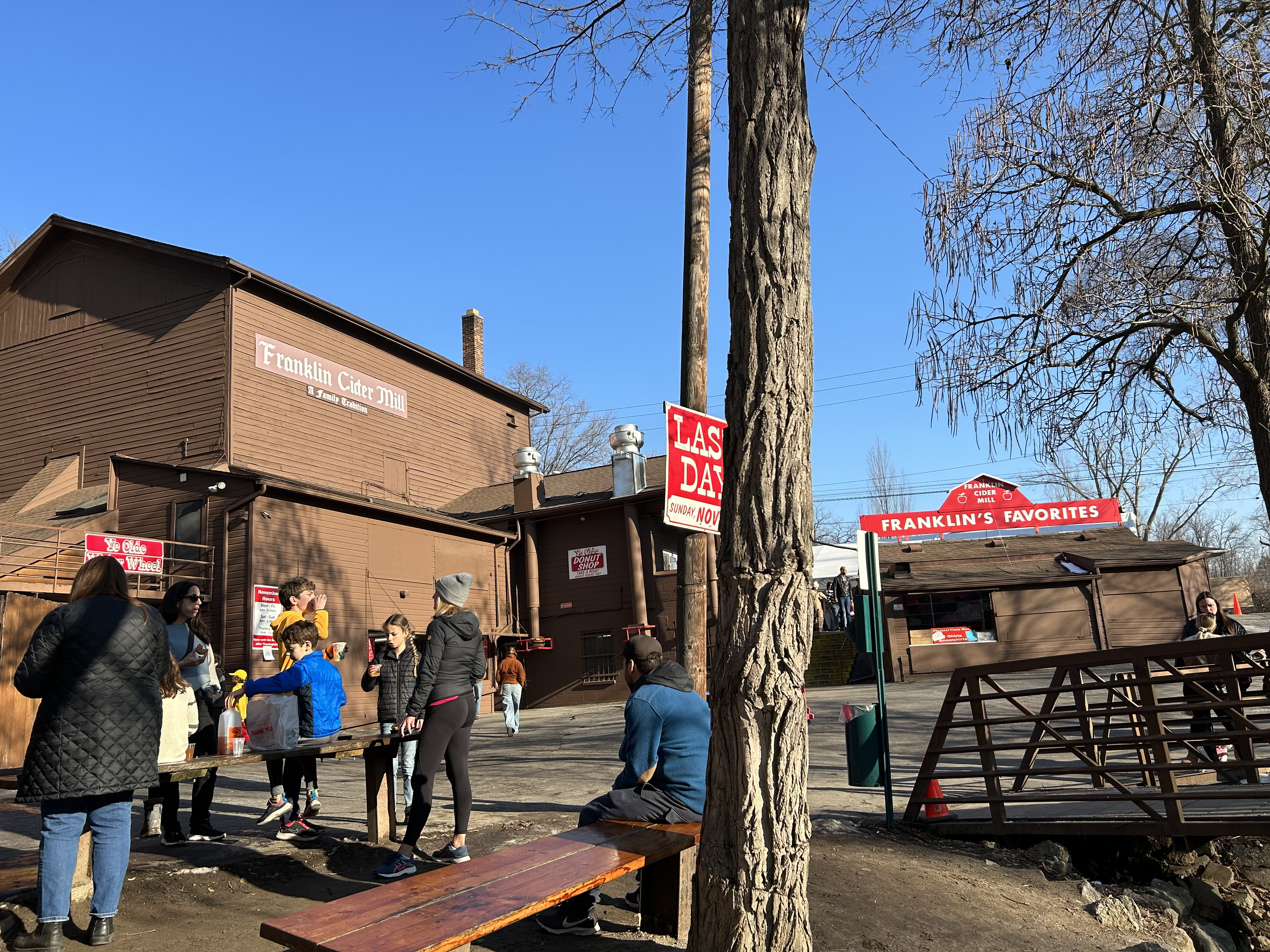
Franklin Cider Mill is a popular visitor attraction

The Franklin Grist Mill was completed in 1837 after three years of construction. The construction was started by W. Matthews. Matthews purchased the large tract of land near the Mill's current location and began the mill in 1832. Due to financial difficulties, Matthews could not finish his project. The property was purchased by Peter VanEvery who completed the building and opened it as a gristmill on the banks of the Franklin River.

Ownership of the Mill changed hands several times during the late 19th and early 20th centuries. In 1914, the mill was sold to James T. Flynn, who installed the first water-powered apple press. Around the turn of the century, the Franklin Grist Mill was flooded and shut down until the property was purchased in 1918 by Robert McKee. McKee stipulated that the cider season would run from August 15 until January 1.

In the 1960s the mill was again sold to Jacob Peltz who operated the mill for almost 35 years until his death in 2004. It was subsequently operated by Peltz's son, Berry, before being passed on to his granddaughter, Melanee Peltz Radner, who serves as the current owner and operator.
