= Franklin Square (Manhattan) =

Former square in Manhattan, New York

Coordinates: 40°42′33.5″N 74°00′06″W

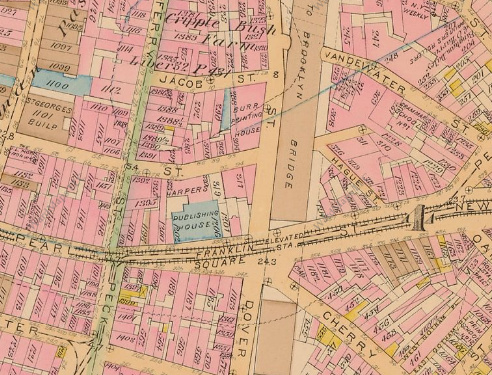
1885 map of the Franklin Square area (North is right)

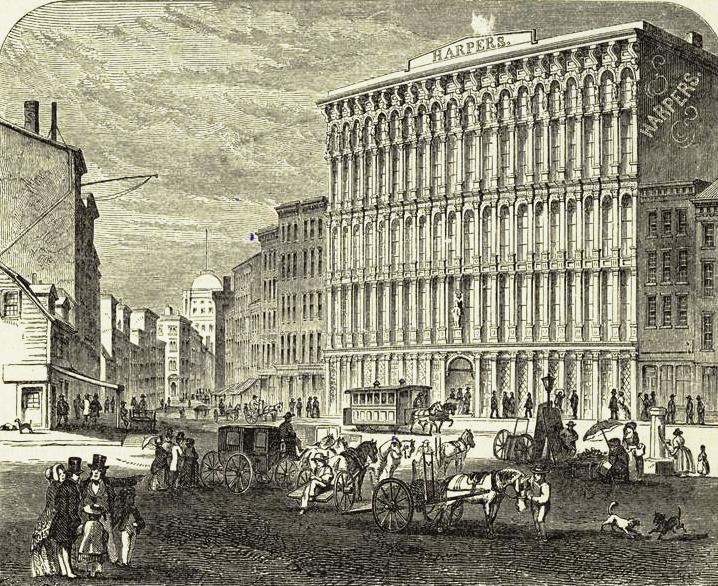
The Harper & Brothers building on Franklin Square, before 1867

Franklin Square was a square in Manhattan on the intersection of Pearl, Dover and Cherry Streets. The Third Avenue El, built in 1877–1878, ran over Franklin Square, and a station was built there. On its west side were the buildings of Harper's Publishing House. The station and square were demolished in 1950, replaced with the Franklin Square Bridge, part of the Manhattan access to the Brooklyn Bridge. At the same time, the block of Cherry Street nearest the square was razed and replaced with the Alfred E. Smith Houses.

The square was originally land owned by Walter Franklin, a highly successful late 18th century merchant, where he kept a mansion with surrounding gardens. The house itself, known as the Samuel Osgood House, was used by George Washington as his residence the first year of his presidency. The house was demolished in 1856.

In honor of Washington, the space was later named "St. George's Square". The space was then renamed Franklin Square in 1817, officially in honor of Benjamin Franklin:

Resolved that the Square now called S^{t} George's Square at the Intersection of Cherry Street be hereafter named and called Franklin Square, as a Testimony of the high respect entertained by this Board for the Literary and Philasophical (sic) Character of the late Doctor Benjamin Franklin.
