= Franklin Historic District (Franklin, Michigan) =

- U.S. National Register of Historic Places
- U.S. Historic district
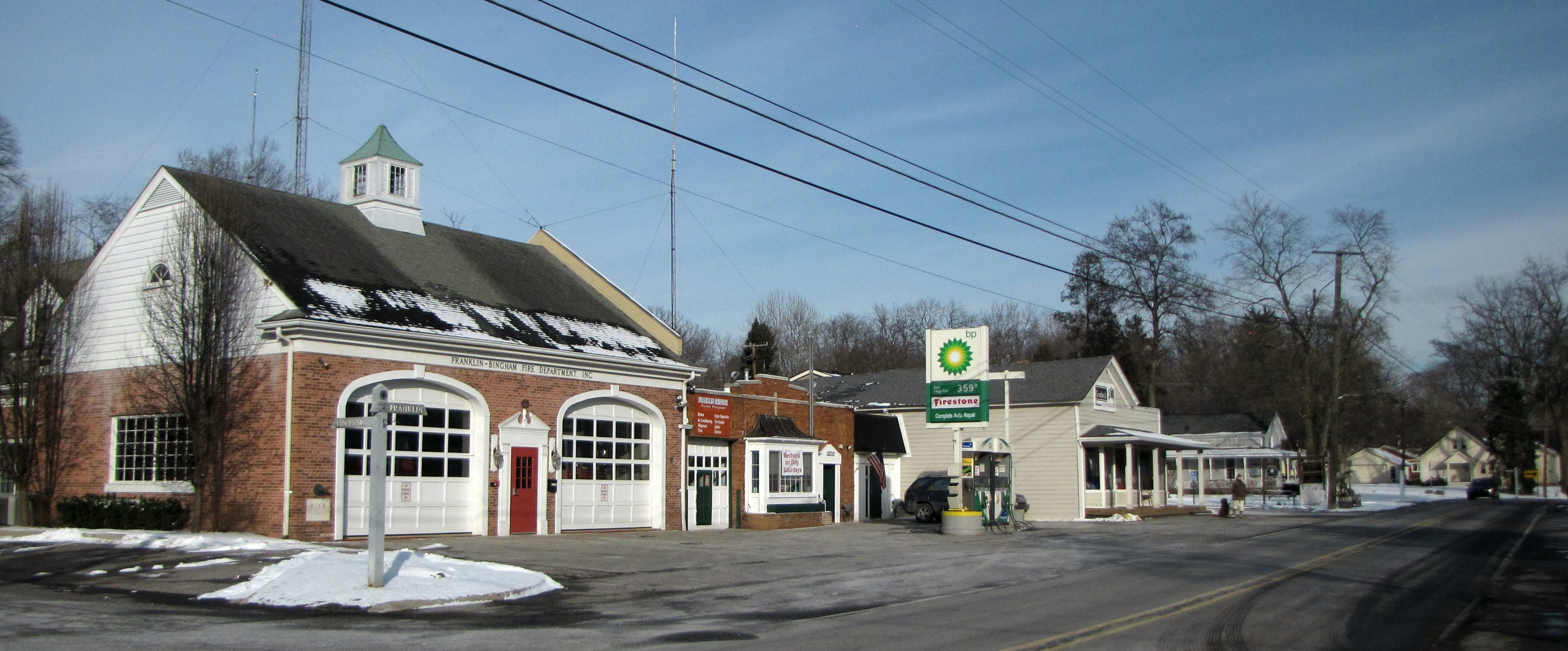
- Franklin Bingham Fire Department on Franklin Road

- Location within Michigan Location within the United States
- Interactive map
- Location: Along Franklin Rd., between Fourteen Mile Rd. and Scenic Dr., Franklin, Michigan
- Coordinates: 42°31′43″N 83°18′18″W
- Area: 174 acres (70 ha)
- Built: 1825
- Architectural style: Greek Revival, Bungalow/craftsman, Colonial Revival
- NRHP reference No.: 69000070 (original); 05000736 (increase)

Significant dates
- Added to NRHP: February 10, 1969
- Boundary increase: July 27, 2005

The Franklin Historic District is a primarily residential and commercial historic district located along Franklin Road and adjoining streets in the village of Franklin, Michigan in Oakland County. The district extends to Fourteen Mile Road on the north, Scenic Drive on the south, the Rouge River on the east, and several hundred feet from Franklin Road on the west. The district was listed on the National Register of Historic Places in 1969, and added to in 2005. It was Michigan's first district to be listed on the National Register.

== History ==
The village of Franklin was founded by European Americans in 1824, and by 1828 had nine families, a US postmaster, and a school. By 1830 a business center was beginning to develop in the heart of what is now this historic district. Several of the early businesses, such as the former Broughton Wagon Shop and the Van Every Mill, are still extant in essentially their original condition.

Franklin grew slowly for the rest of the nineteenth century. After World War I, however, many Detroit residents began relocating in the suburbs, as the population of the city continued to expand rapidly and new housing was needed. In 1926, the first formal platting of the village took place. Further population shifts accompanied highway construction and suburbanization after World War II, resulting in a development boom in this area. To prevent overdevelopment in Franklin, in the early 1970s The Franklin Historical Society began efforts to enact zoning laws to restrict it.

== Description ==
The original portion of the historic district along Franklin Road approximately follows the boundaries of Franklin in the early 1870s. This section of the district includes 26 historically significant properties, many dating to the mid-1830s. The expanded district includes nearly 150 buildings total, of which about 100 are considered contributing as historically significant. The district is located along or adjacent to Franklin Road.

Some of the most significant structures include:

- Franklin Cemetery (comer of Franklin Road and Scenic Drive), a six-acre cemetery with monuments ranging from 1829 to the present.
- House (32020 Franklin Road), a 1929 slate-roofed Tudor structure.
- Franklin Village School (32220 Franklin Road), large brick structure constructed in 1923, with two rear additions.
- Broughton House (32325 Franklin Road), a Greek Revival house constructed in the 1830s and now used as the village hall.
- J.J. Trott House (26110 Carol), an 1850 Greek Revival style house.
- Franklin Village Library
- Franklin Community Church (32473 Normandy Road), a large, prominent structure built in 1956.
- Methodist Protestant Church (26109 German Mill Road), now a private residence; served successively as the primary house of worship for several of the village's different religious denominations.
- Market Basket (32652 Franklin Road), constructed as a general store in 1900.
- Franklin Hotel (32751 Franklin Road), constructed in 1831.
- Temperance Hotel (32800 Franklin Road), constructed in 1840.
- Franklin Cider Mill (7450 Franklin Road), a wood-frame structure built in 1837, which served the village as a grist mill until 1949, when it was converted into a cider mill.

== Gallery ==
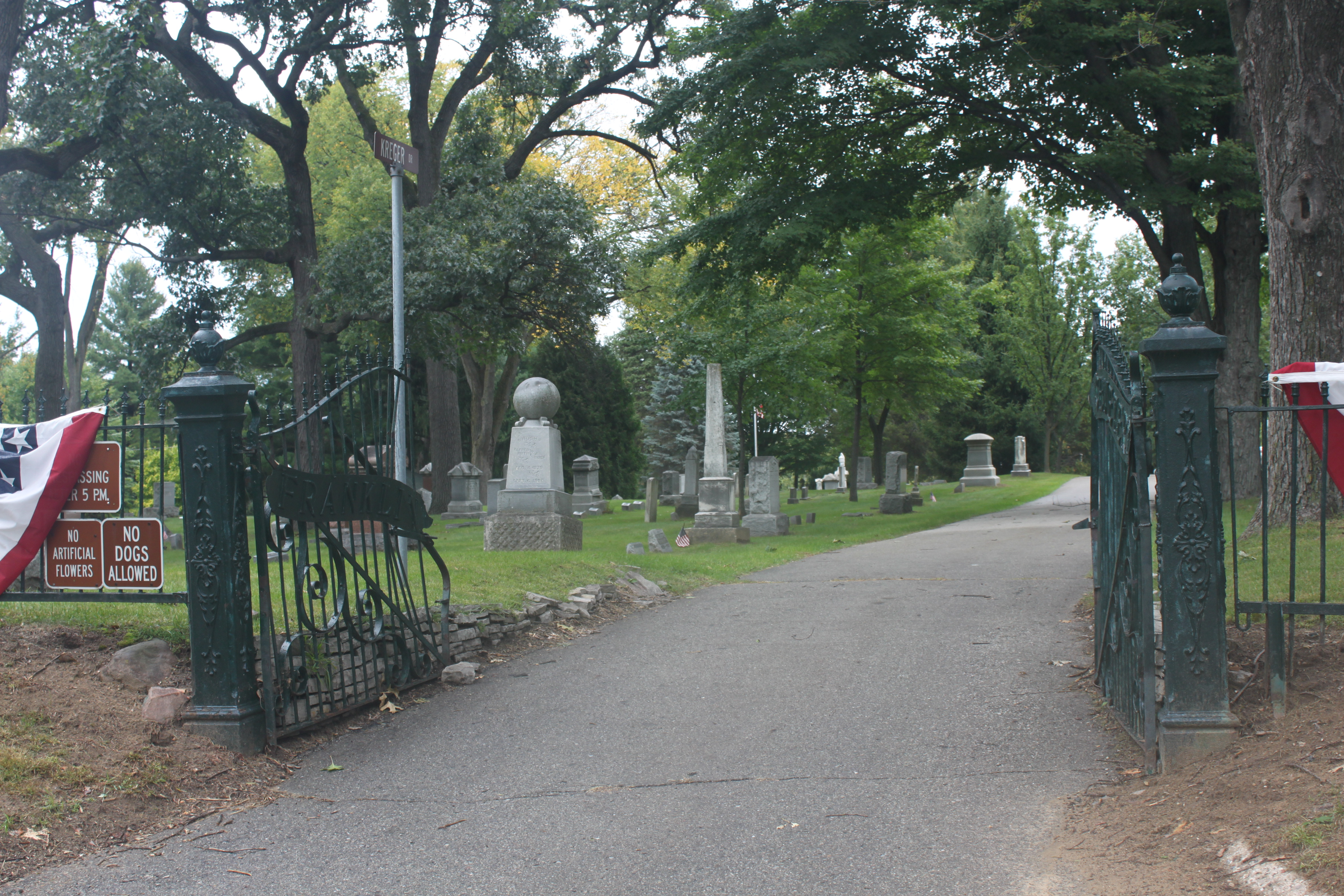
Franklin Cemetery

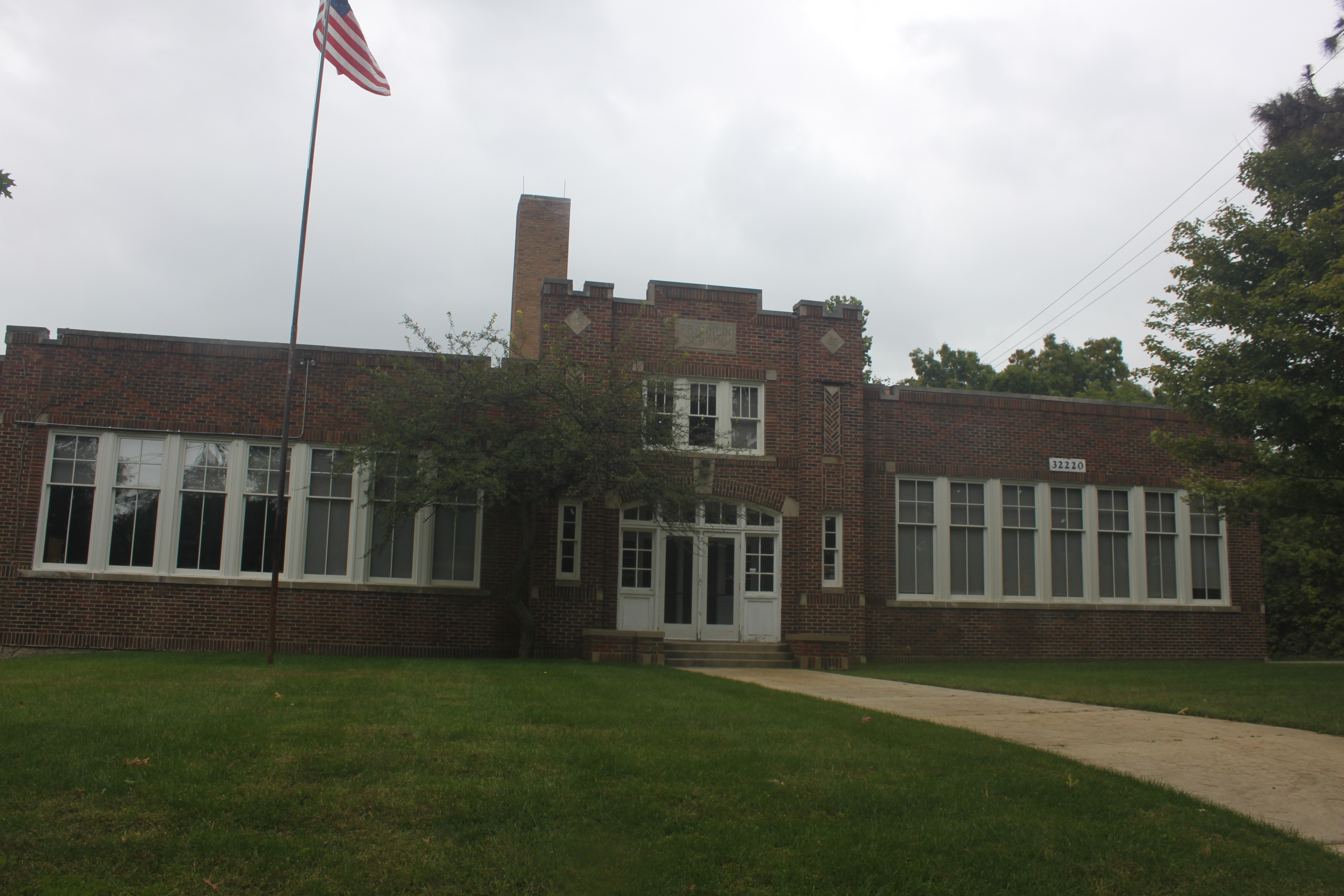
Franklin Village School

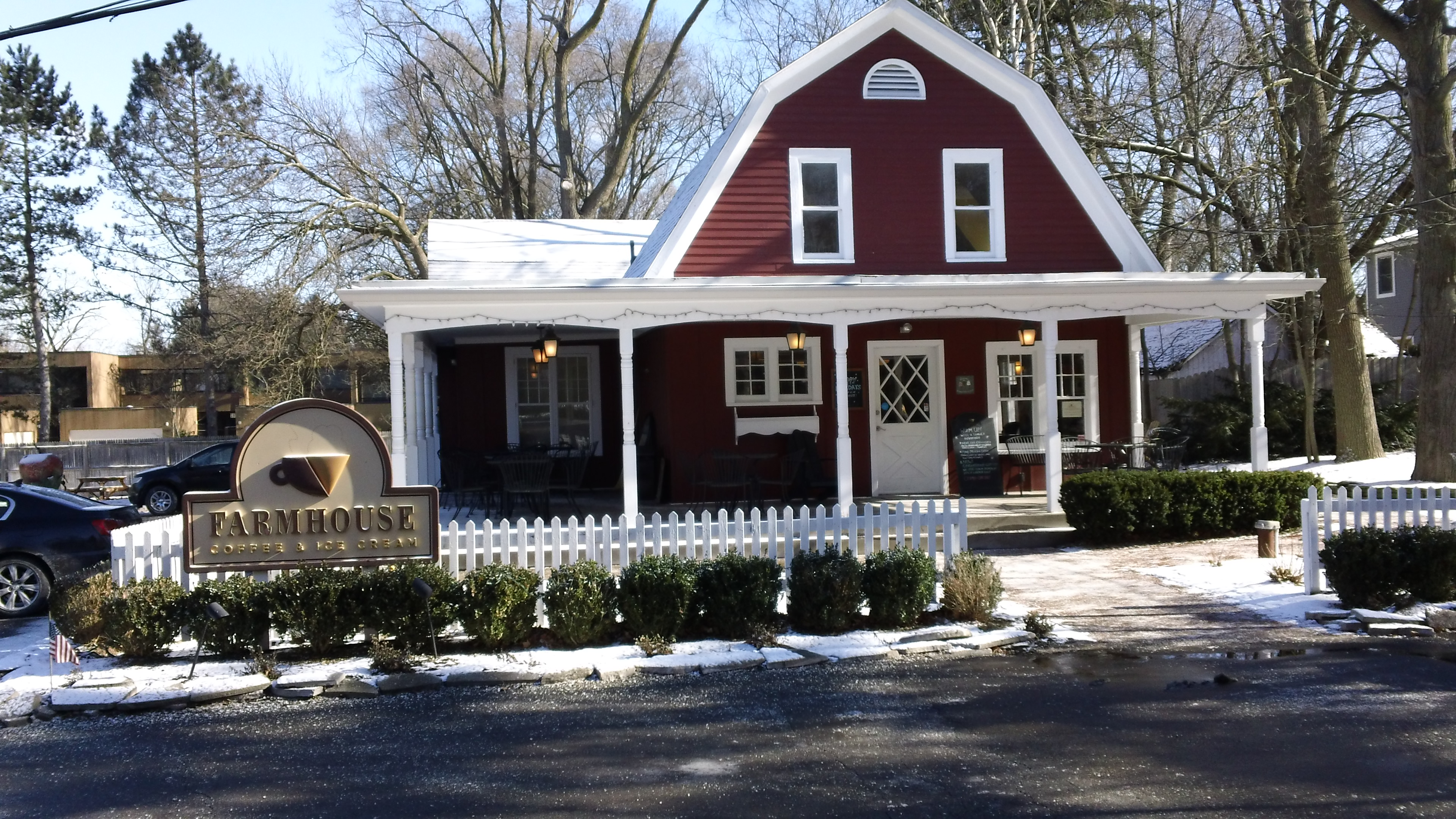
Farmhouse Coffee on Franklin Road

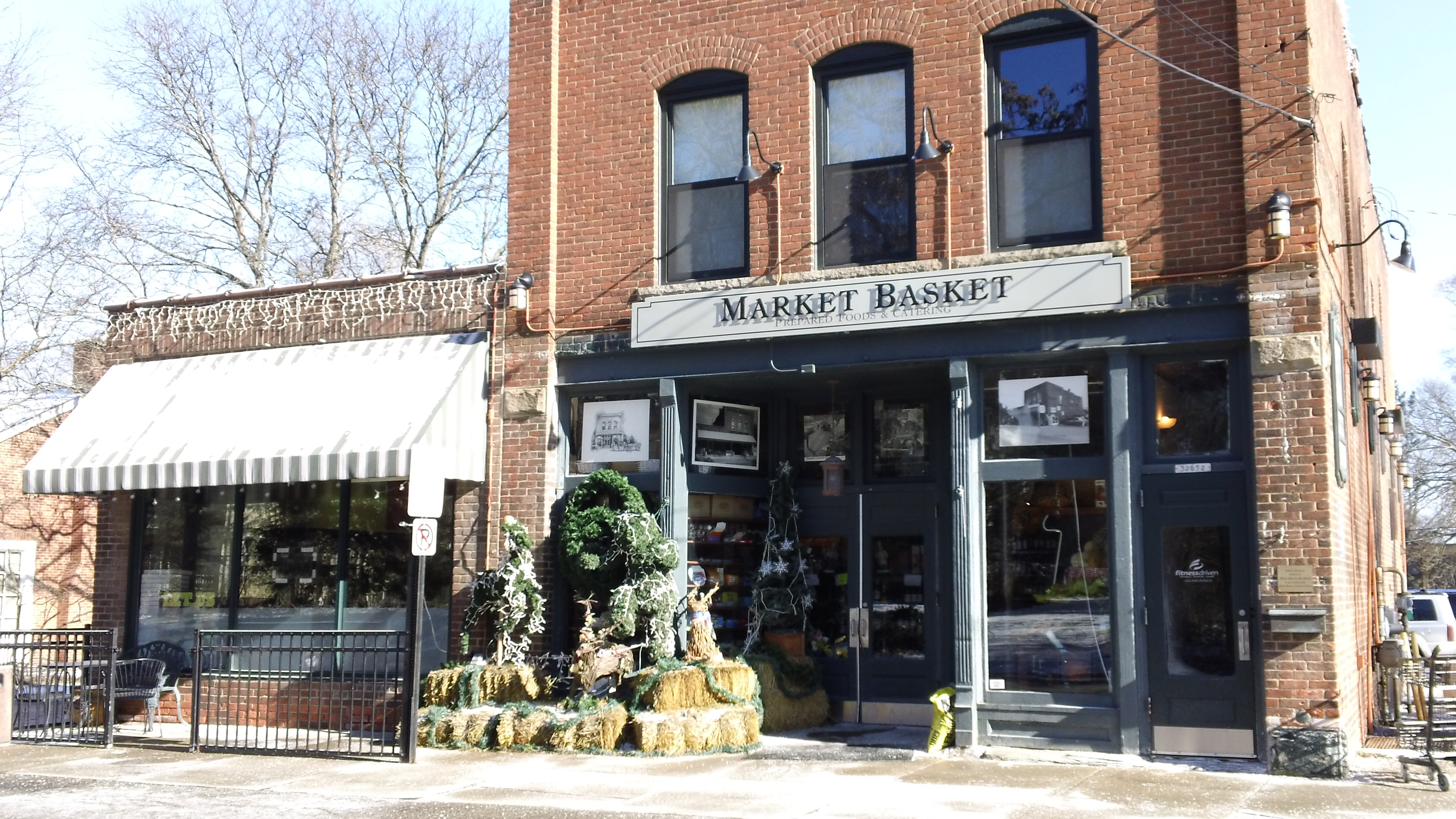
Market Basket on Franklin Road

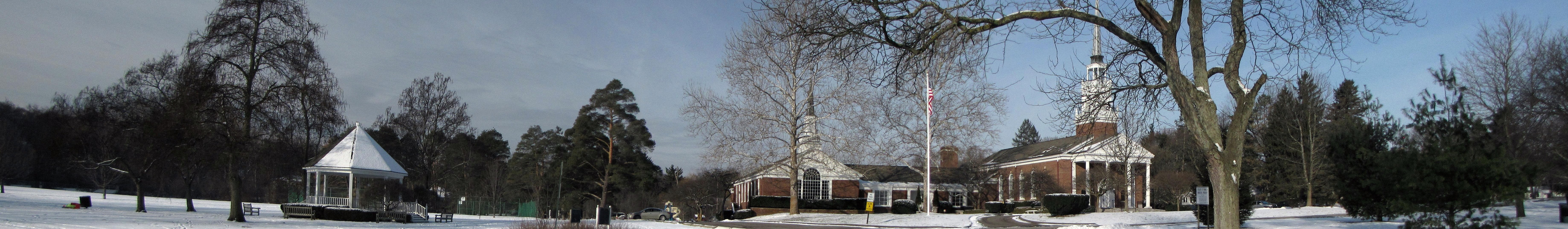
Franklin Community Church

== See also ==
- National Register of Historic Places listings in Oakland County, Michigan
