= Franklin Historic District (Franklin, Pennsylvania) =

Historic district in Pennsylvania, United States

- U.S. National Register of Historic Places
- U.S. Historic district
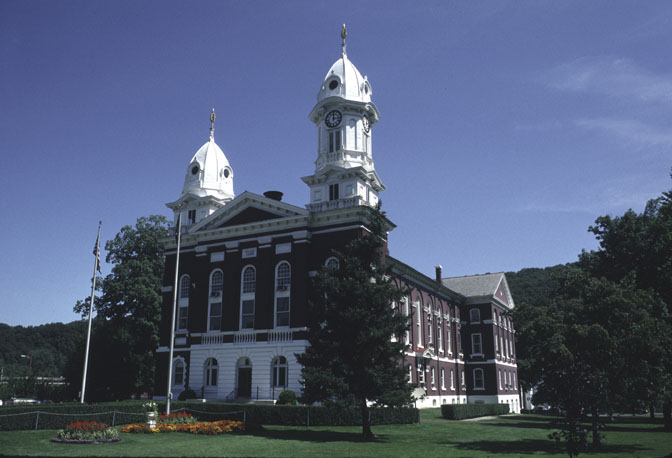
- Venango County Courthouse, August 1992

- Location within Pennsylvania Location within the United States
- Location: Roughly bounded by Miller Ave., Otter, 8th, Buffalo, and 16th Sts., Franklin, Pennsylvania
- Coordinates: 41°23′36″N 79°49′52″W
- Area: 152.9 acres (61.9 ha)
- Architectural style: Queen Anne, Federal, Greek Revival
- NRHP reference No.: 84003583
- Added to NRHP: January 26, 1984

Franklin Historic District is a national historic district located at Franklin, Venango County, Pennsylvania. The district includes 380 contributing buildings in the central business district and surrounding residential areas of Franklin. It includes commercial, residential, industrial, and institutional buildings. They are in a variety of popular architectural styles including Queen Anne, Greek Revival, and Federal. Notable non-residential buildings include the Venango County Courthouse (1867, 1931–32), County Jail, and First United Methodist Church.

It was added to the National Register of Historic Places in 1984.
