= Franklin Square station (IRT Third Avenue Line) =

Former Manhattan Railway elevated station (closed 1950)

Franklin Square
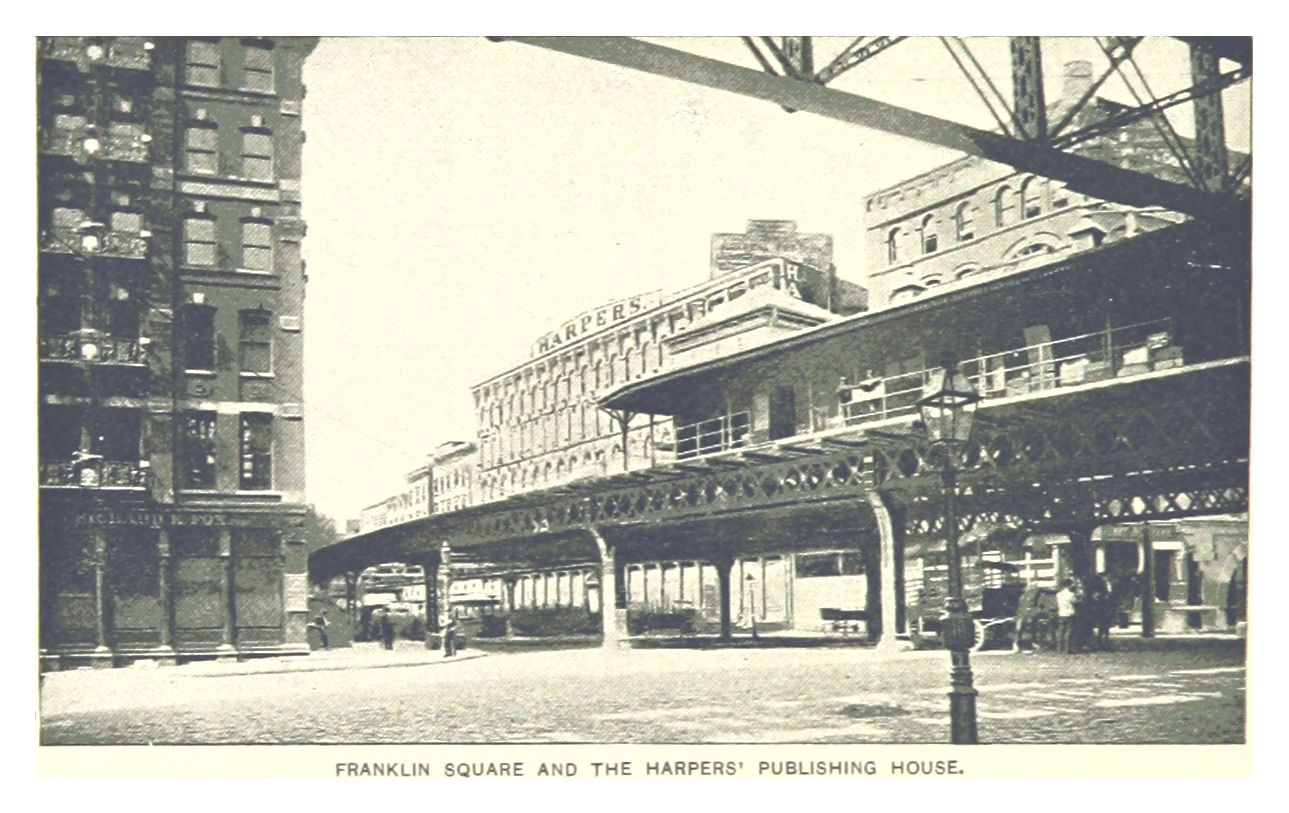

General information
- Location: Pearl, Dover and Frankfort Streets; Lower Manhattan, Manhattan, New York
- Coordinates: 40°42′34″N 74°0′5″W
- System: Former Manhattan Railway elevated station
- Operator: Interborough Rapid Transit Company; City of New York (after 1940)
- Line: Third Avenue Line
- Platforms: 1 island platform
- Tracks: 2

Construction
- Structure type: Elevated

History
- Opened: August 26, 1878; 147 years ago
- Closed: December 22, 1950; 75 years ago

Other services
Preceding station	Interborough Rapid Transit	Following station
Chatham Square toward 129th Street	Second Avenue Local	Fulton Street toward South Ferry
Chatham Square toward 129th Street	Third Avenue Local	Fulton Street toward South Ferry
Location

The Franklin Square station was an express station on the demolished IRT Third Avenue Line in Manhattan, New York City. It was built by the New York Elevated Railroad in 1878 over the aforementioned square, had two tracks and one island platform, and was the northernmost station on the line that shared both Second Avenue and Third Avenue trains. The next stop to the north was Chatham Square. The next stop to the south was Fulton Street. The station closed on December 22, 1950.
