= Franklin Square Historic District (Oswego, New York) =

Historic district in New York, United States

- U.S. National Register of Historic Places
- U.S. Historic district
- Location within New York Location within the United States
- Location: Roughly bounded by 3rd, 6th, Van Buren, and Bridge Sts., Oswego, New York
- Coordinates: 43°27′25″N 76°30′59″W
- Area: 35 acres (14 ha)
- Built: 1825
- Architect: Multiple
- Architectural style: Queen Anne, Federal, Italianate
- NRHP reference No.: 82003394
- Added to NRHP: August 4, 1982

Franklin Square Historic District is a national historic district located at Oswego in Oswego County, New York. The district includes 93 contributing buildings and one contributing site.

It was listed on the National Register of Historic Places in 1982.
