= Franklin Square Historic District (Baltimore, Maryland) =

Historic district in Maryland, United States

- U.S. National Register of Historic Places
- U.S. Historic district
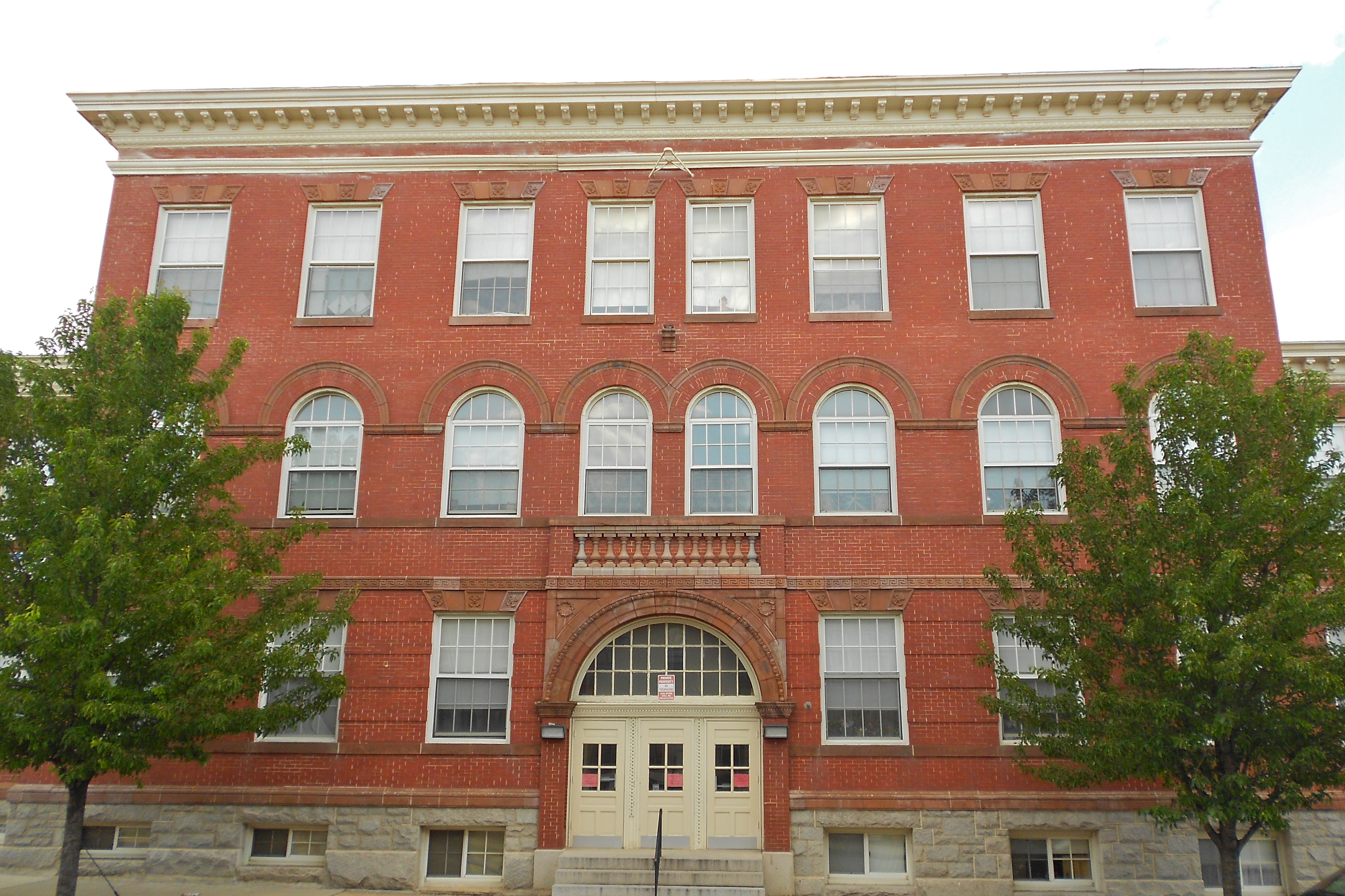
- Franklin Square School

- Location within Baltimore Location within Maryland Location within the United States
- Location: Bounded by Mulberry, N. Carey, W. Baltimore, and Monroe Sts., Baltimore, Maryland
- Coordinates: 39°17′29″N 76°38′36″W
- Area: 95 acres (38 ha)
- Built: 1859
- Architect: Multiple
- NRHP reference No.: 82001585
- Added to NRHP: December 10, 1982

Franklin Square Historic District is a national historic district in Baltimore, Maryland, United States. It is a 19th-century rowhouse neighborhood developed along a strict grid street pattern. A one square block, two and a half acre public park, Franklin Square, is a focal point for the area and the most elaborate rowhousing surrounds the square. The district contains approximately 1,300 buildings of which approximately 1,250 contribute to the significance of the historic district.

It was added to the National Register of Historic Places in 1982.
