= Franklin Square (Bloomington, Illinois) =

- U.S. National Register of Historic Places
- U.S. Historic district
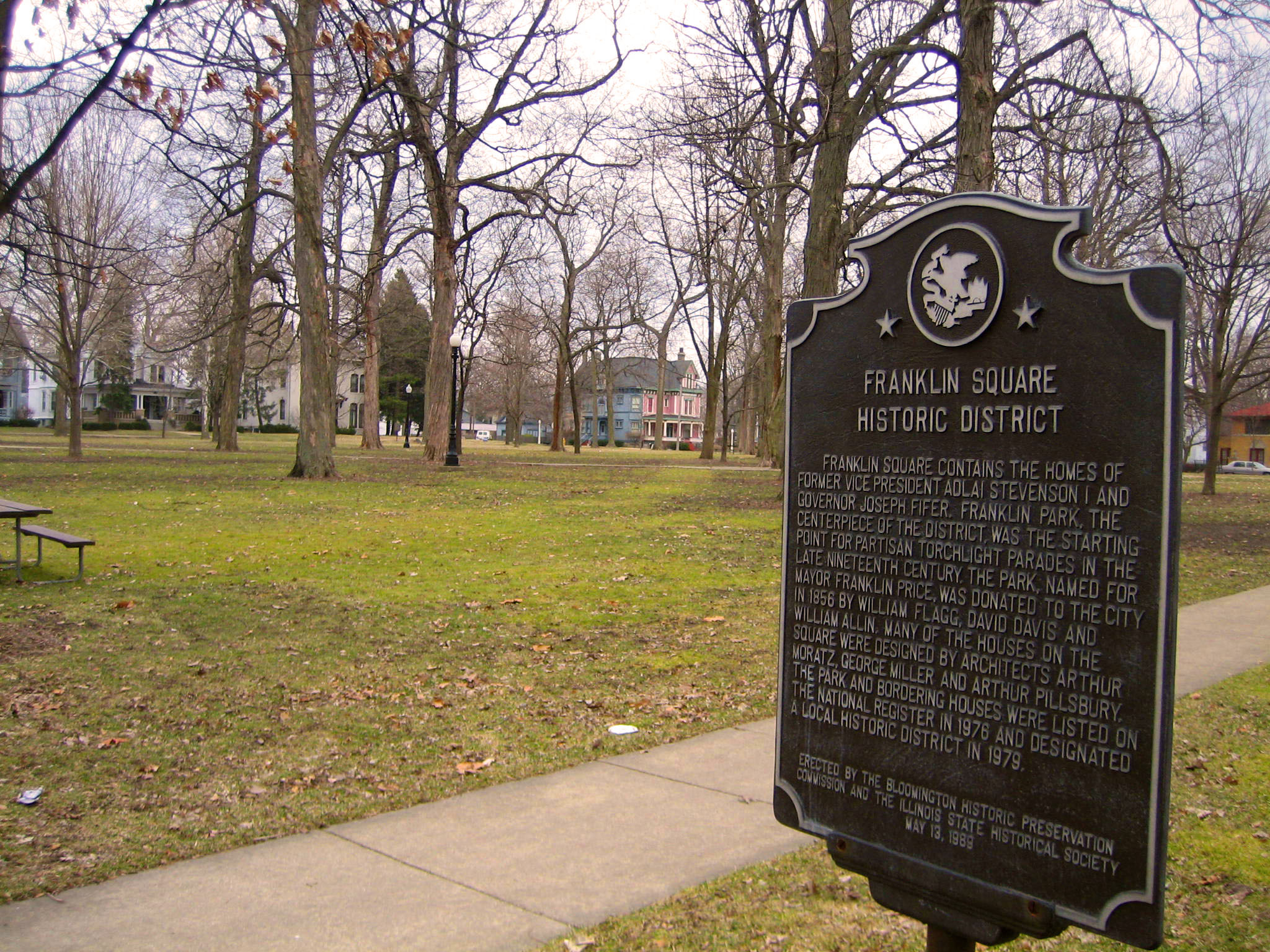
- Franklin Park, the heart of the historic district.

- Location within Illinois
- Location: 300 and 400 blocks of E. Chestnut and E. Walnut Streets, 900 block of N. Prairie and N. McLean Streets, Bloomington, Illinois
- Coordinates: 40°29′10″N 88°59′24″W
- Area: 26 acres (11 ha)
- Architectural style: Queen Anne Victorian, Georgian Revival, Romanesque Revival, Italianate
- NRHP reference No.: 76002164
- Added to NRHP: January 11, 1976

Franklin Square, or Franklin Park is located in Bloomington, Illinois, McLean County. Listed on the National Register of Historic Places, Franklin Square contains the homes of former Vice President Adlai Stevenson I and former Governor Joseph W. Fifer. In 1979 the square was designated as a local historic district. Located northeast of downtown Bloomington, the square encompasses the 300 and 400 blocks of E. Chestnut and E. Walnut streets and the 900 block of N. Prairie and N. McLean streets.

== History ==
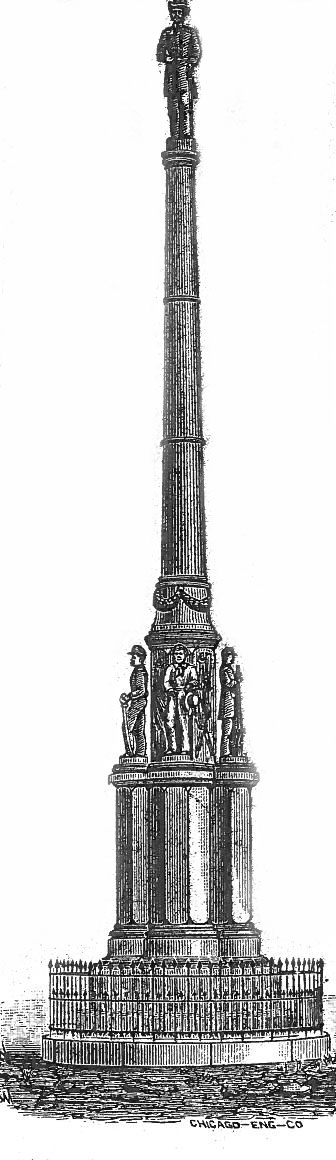
Lithograph of the Franklin Square Monument by Haldeman Marble Works

On April 26, 1856, David Davis, William F. Flagg, and William H. Allin donated a 590-by-330-foot parcel of land to the city of Bloomington, asking that the park be “...used as a place of public resort, pastime and recreation, for citizens and strangers forever.” The original agreement called for the city to improve and ornament the park, and prohibited the city from erecting any buildings on the square.

In 1869, a monument was erected in the center of Franklin Square to commemorate the 700 McLean County citizens who died in the Civil War. Commissioned to Haldeman Marble Works of Bloomington, Illinois, for $15,000, the monument stood 49 feet high with a Lemont limestone base. An inscription read, “McLean County’s Honored Sons: Fallen—but not Forgotten” with engravings of the names of the 700 soldiers that died in service. The structure featured four statues of soldiers (Infantry, Cavalry, Zouave, and Marine) and a life-size figure of a colonel atop an 18-foot shaft.

Over the next few years, the monument began to disintegrate. A committee organized to resolve the situation stated, “Unfortunately, the material of which the monument was constructed has proved to be so perishable that the names of the county’s heroes have been nearly obliterated and the entire monument is in danger of falling.” Former Governor Joseph Fifer lobbied for the city to tear down the monument and build a new one in Miller Park in Bloomington. The lower half of the monument was saved and is currently located in the Bloomington neighborhood of Briarwood.

== Houses ==
The houses of Franklin Square were built in a variety of architectural styles from the mid 19th century through the early 20th century, including Georgian Revival, Italianate, Colonial, Queen Anne, and Richardsonian Romanesque. Because the square was home to many prominent citizens of Bloomington, the neighborhood received visits from notable figures, among them Theodore Roosevelt, Ulysses S. Grant, Clarence Darrow, and Carl Sandburg. Today many Illinois Wesleyan University students reside in the square's houses, including the Alpha Lamba chapter of Phi Mu Alpha Sinfonia and the Sigma Alpha chapter of Sigma Alpha Iota.

- Burr House - This house was built for Luman Burr at 210 E. Chestnut in 1864 by the Hayes & Evans Contracting Company. It was constructed in the Federal style and later remodeled with Queen Anne Style elements; gabled roof, left wing, and back wing were added in the early 20th century.
- Dodson-Stevenson House - This 1869 home was built at 901 N. McLean St. in the Italianate style for William K. Dodson. The home's second owner was Adlai E. Stevenson I who became vice president under the administration of Grover Cleveland.
- Fifer-Bohrer House - This Georgian Revival style home was built in 1895 at 909 N. McLean St. and included Queen Anne style elements. The house was home to former Illinois Governor Joseph W. Fifer and his daughter Florence Fifer Bohrer, who was the first female senator in the Illinois General Assembly.
- McClure House - Marion Lee McClure, a farmer, landowner, and land speculator commissioned architect George Miller to build a Richardsonian Romanesque style house in 1906 that resembled one he saw in Chicago. The house is known as "The Castle" and features a third-floor ballroom.
- Lillard House This house at 302 Walnut St. was built in 1882 in the Victorian-era Queen Anne style. The first owner of the home, John T. Lillard, was a prominent attorney in Bloomington, Illinois, and married Sarah Davis, daughter of Judge David Davis.

== Gallery ==
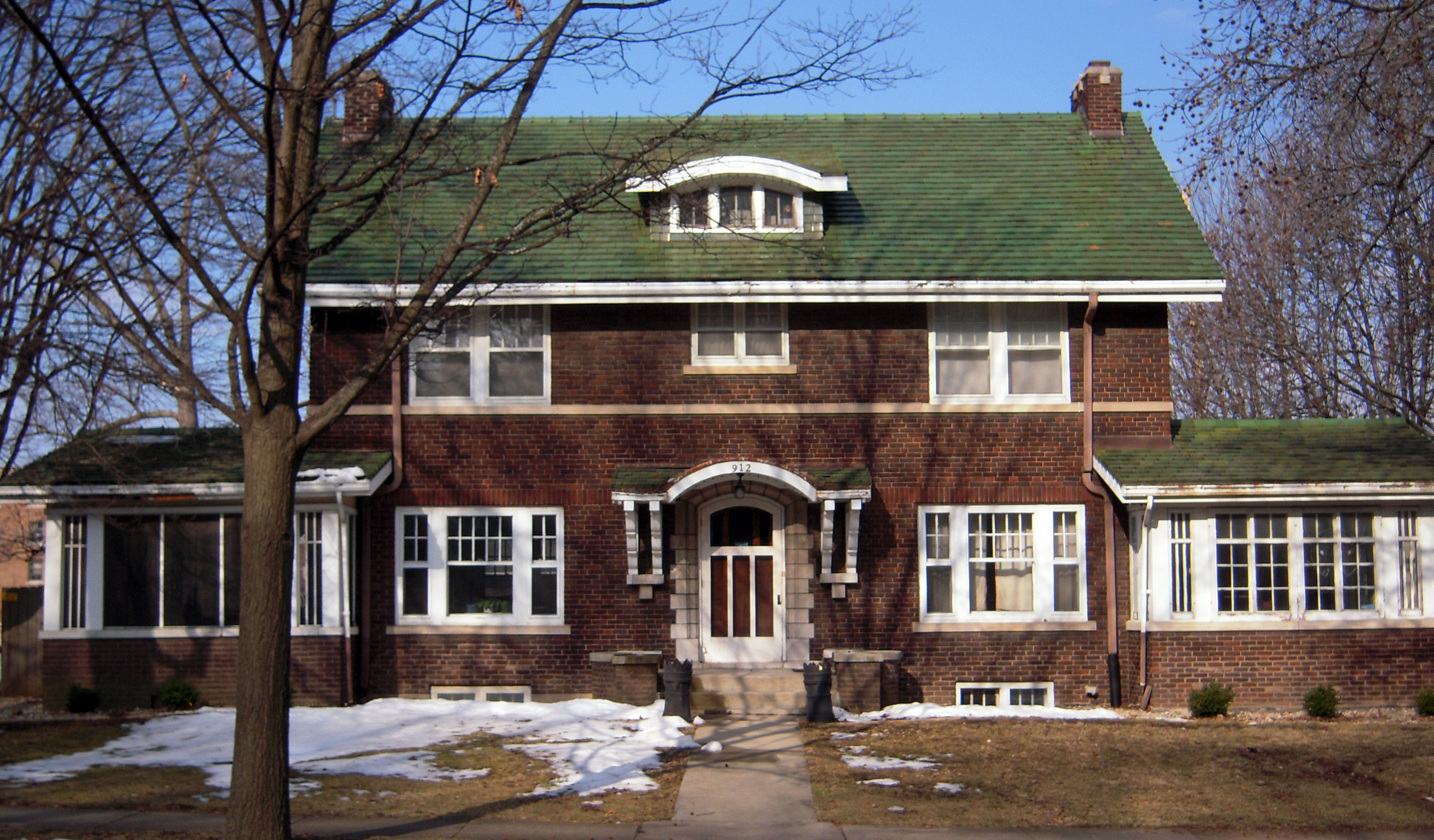
The Prairie style Kirkpatrick House, built in 1914 and moved to Franklin Park from the east corner of Chestnut & East Streets in 1979

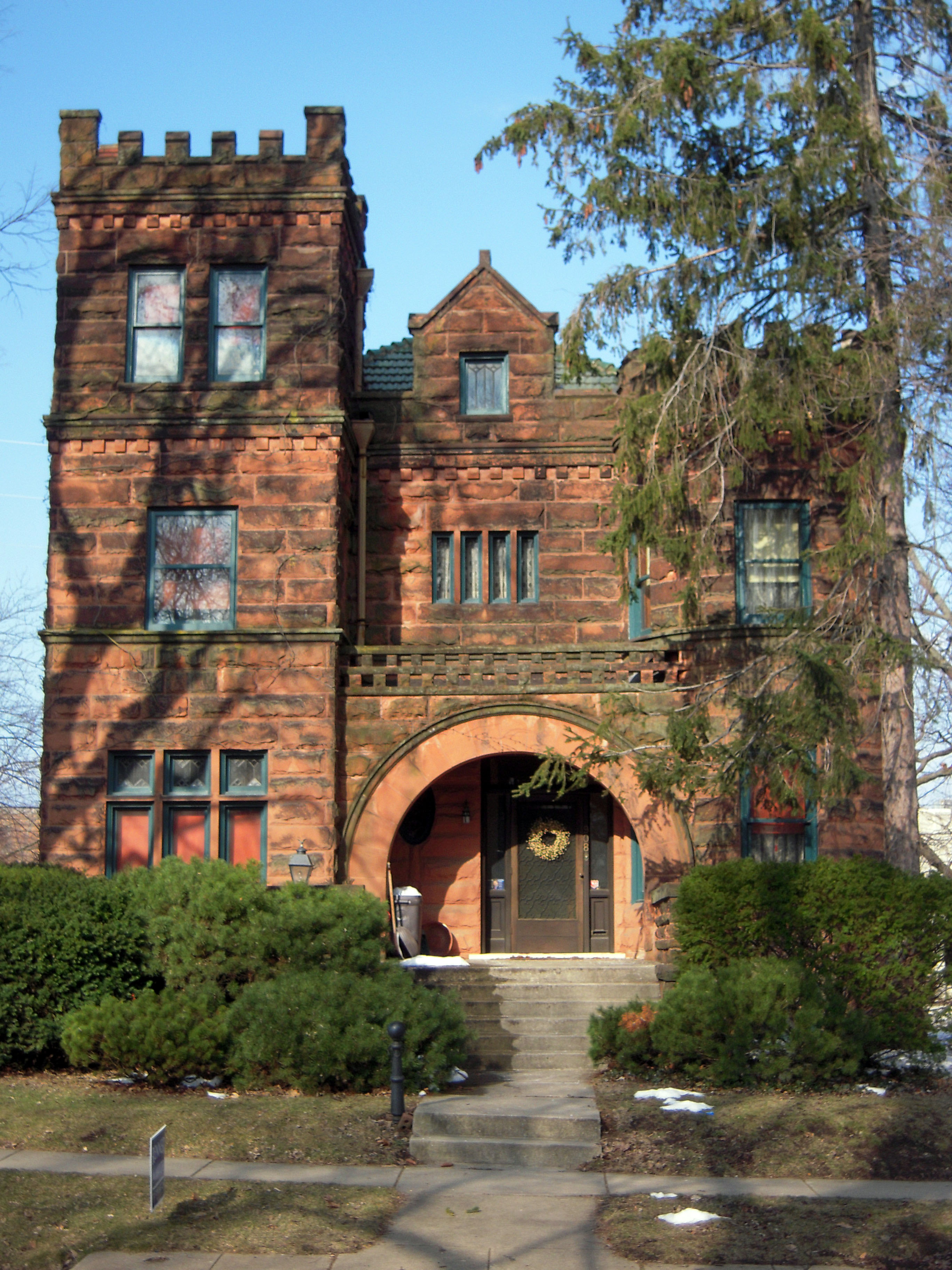
The Richardsonian Romanesque style McClure House

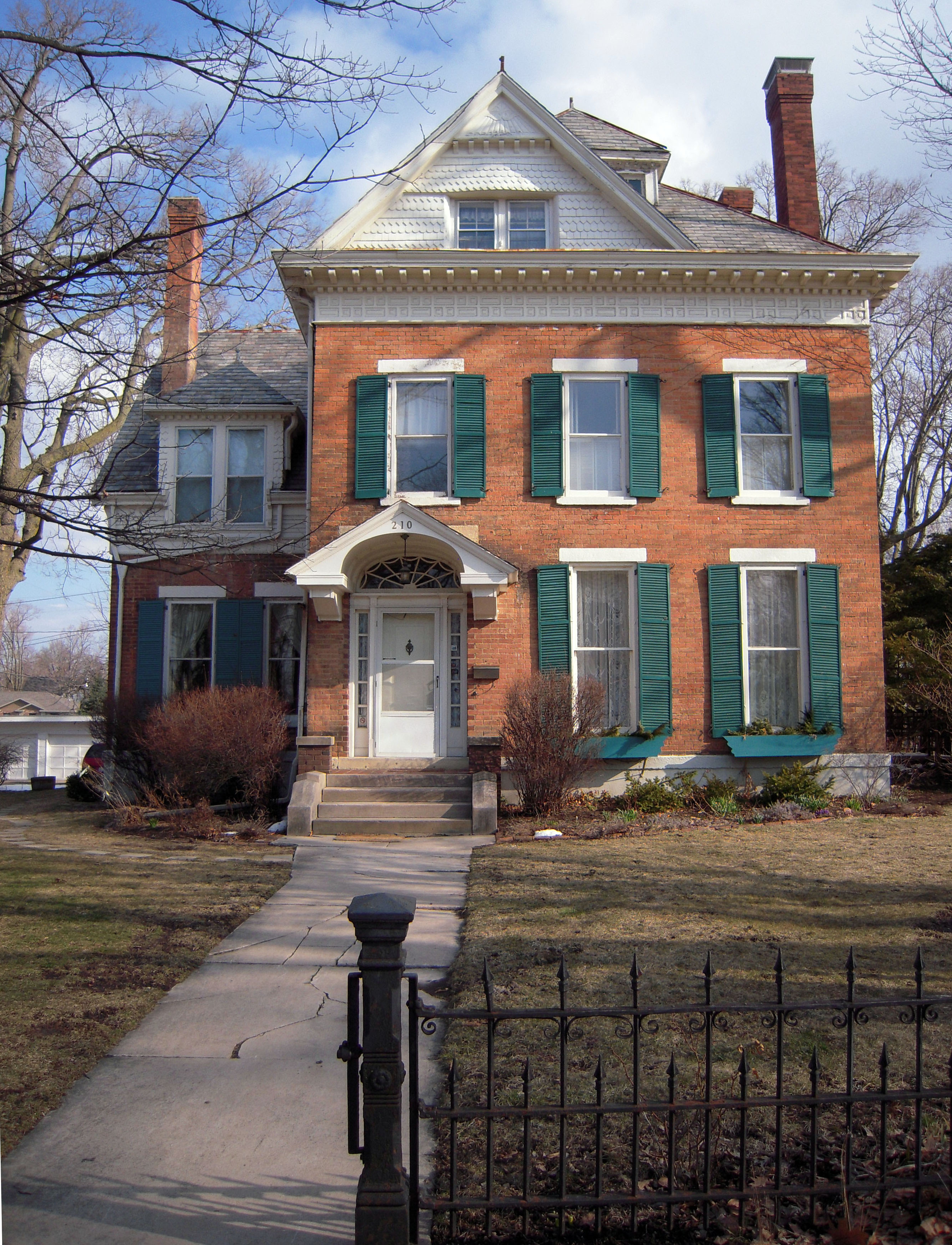
The Burr House is a mixture of Federal and Queen Anne styles

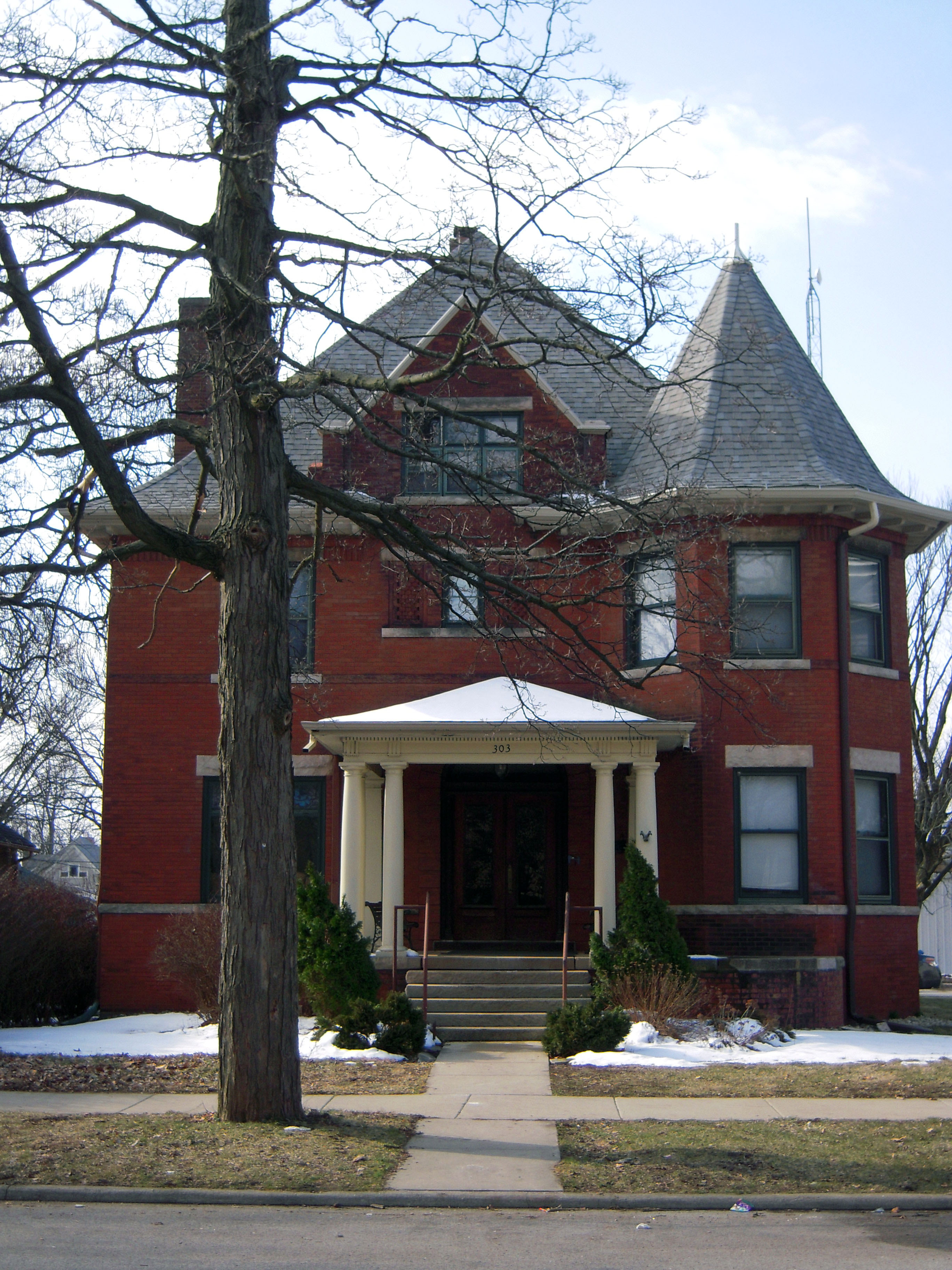
Phi Mu Alpha Sinfonia chapter house

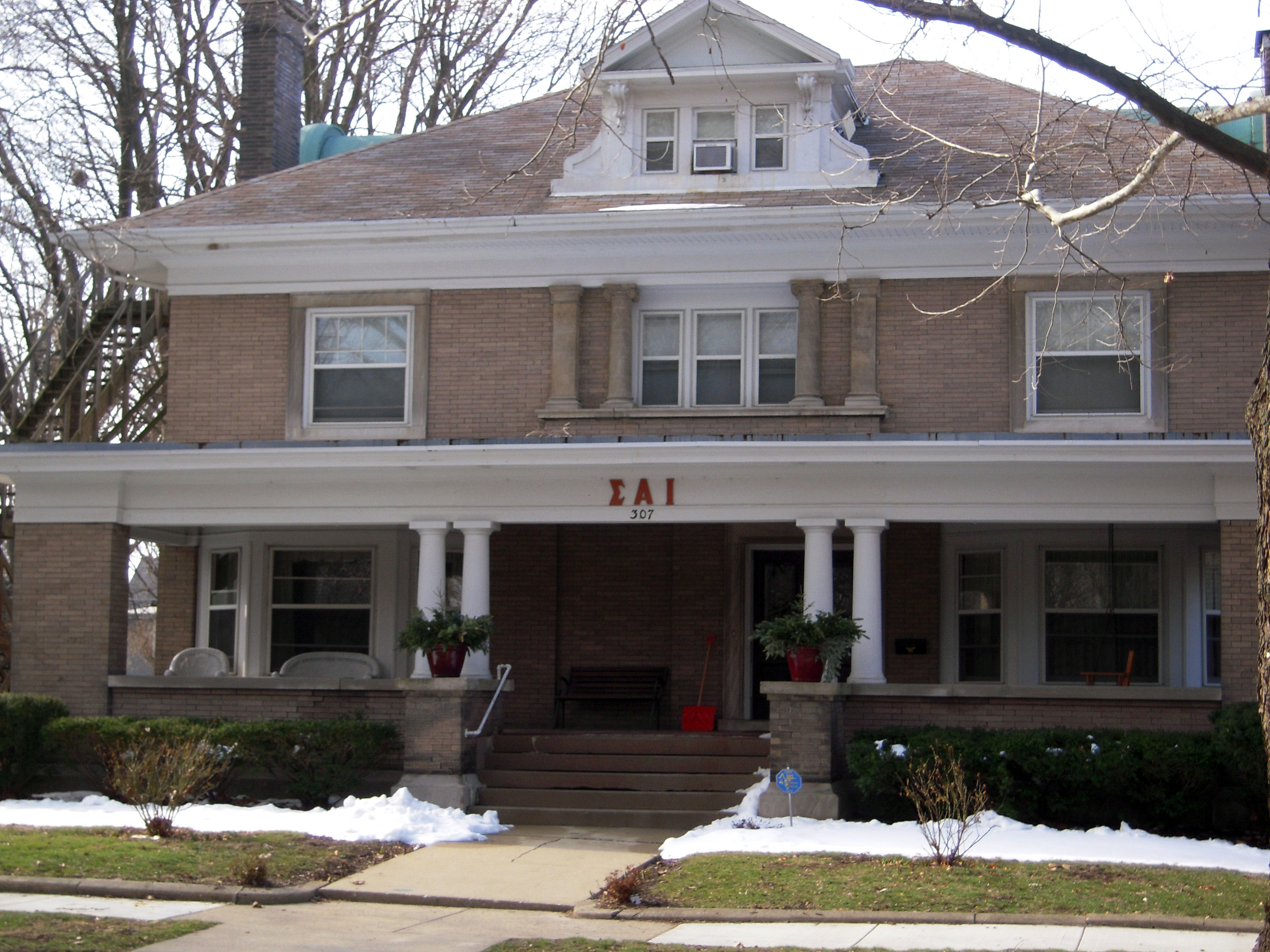
Sigma Alpha Iota, Sigma Alpha chapter house

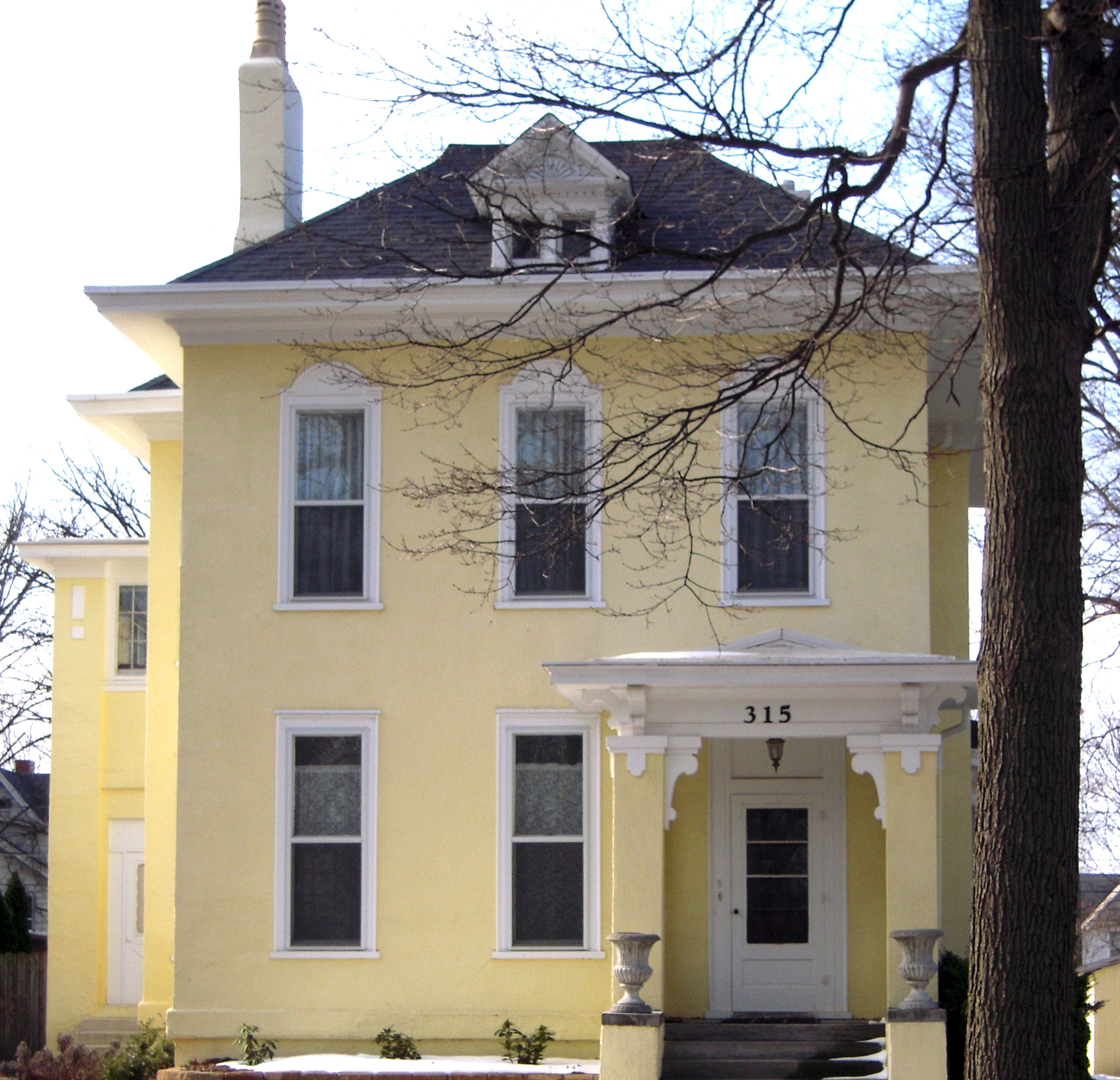
Italianate style

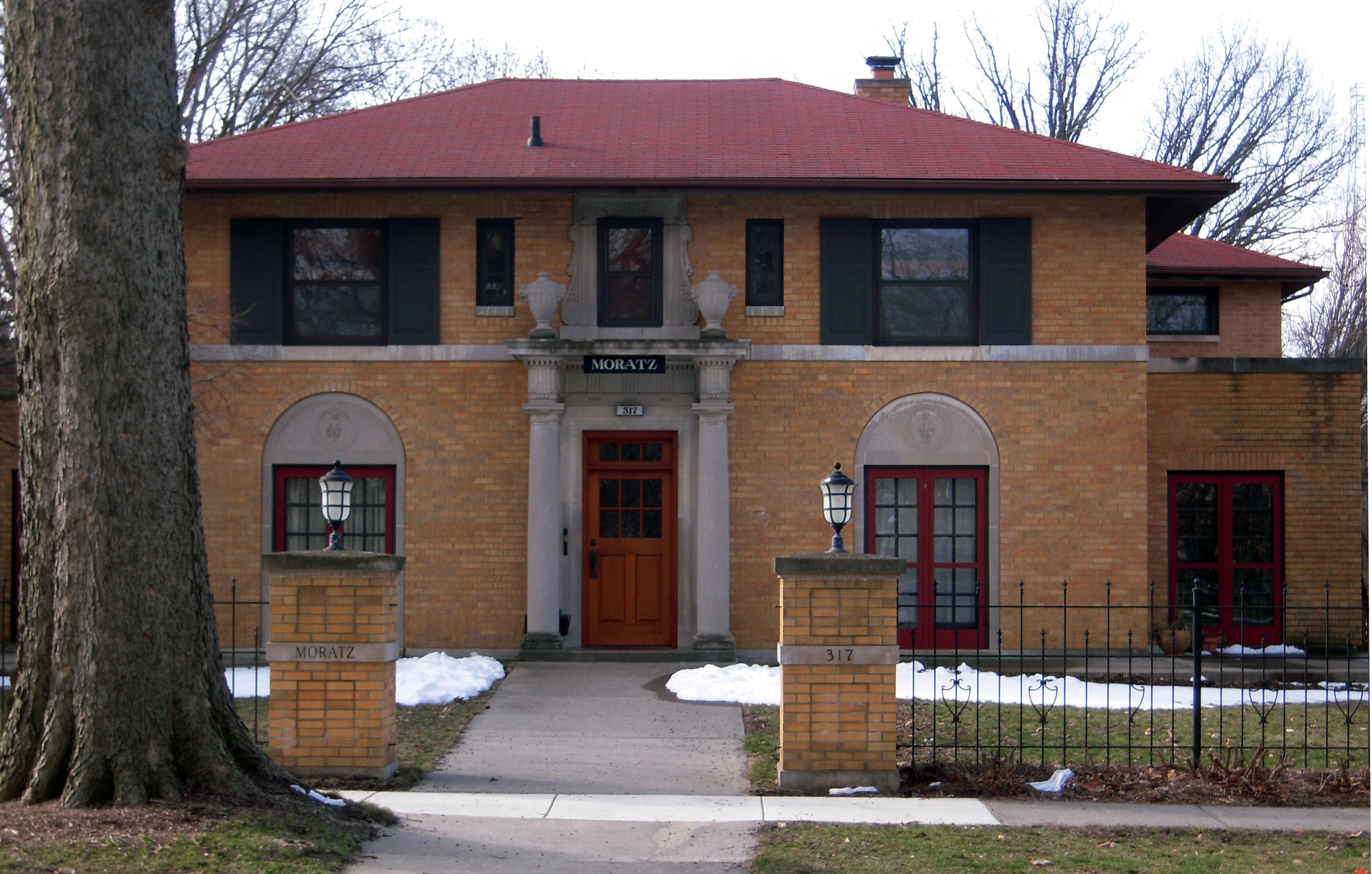
Italian Renaissance style house built and occupied by local architect Arthur F. Moratz

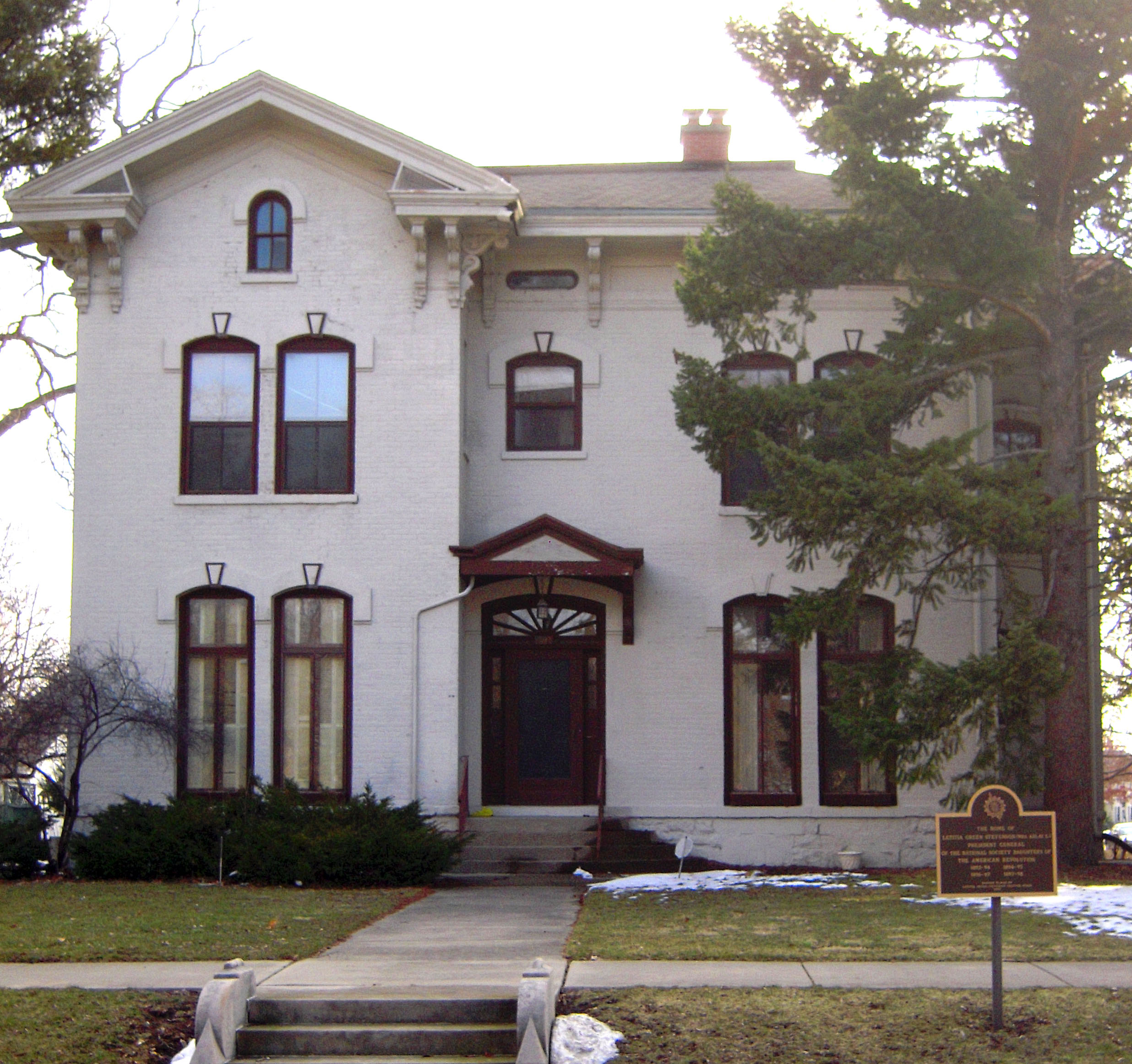
Former home of Adlai Stevenson I

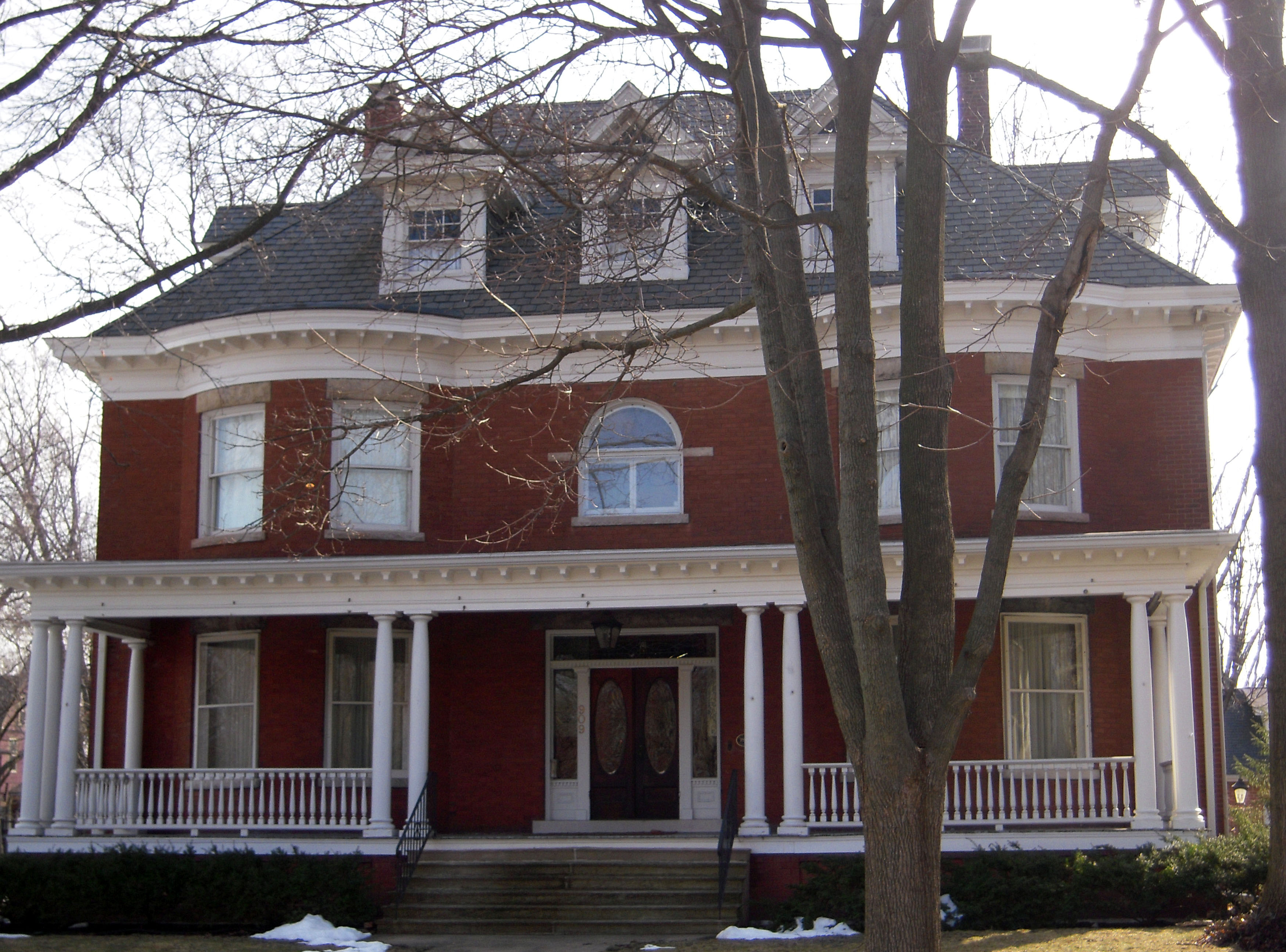
Fifer-Bohrer house

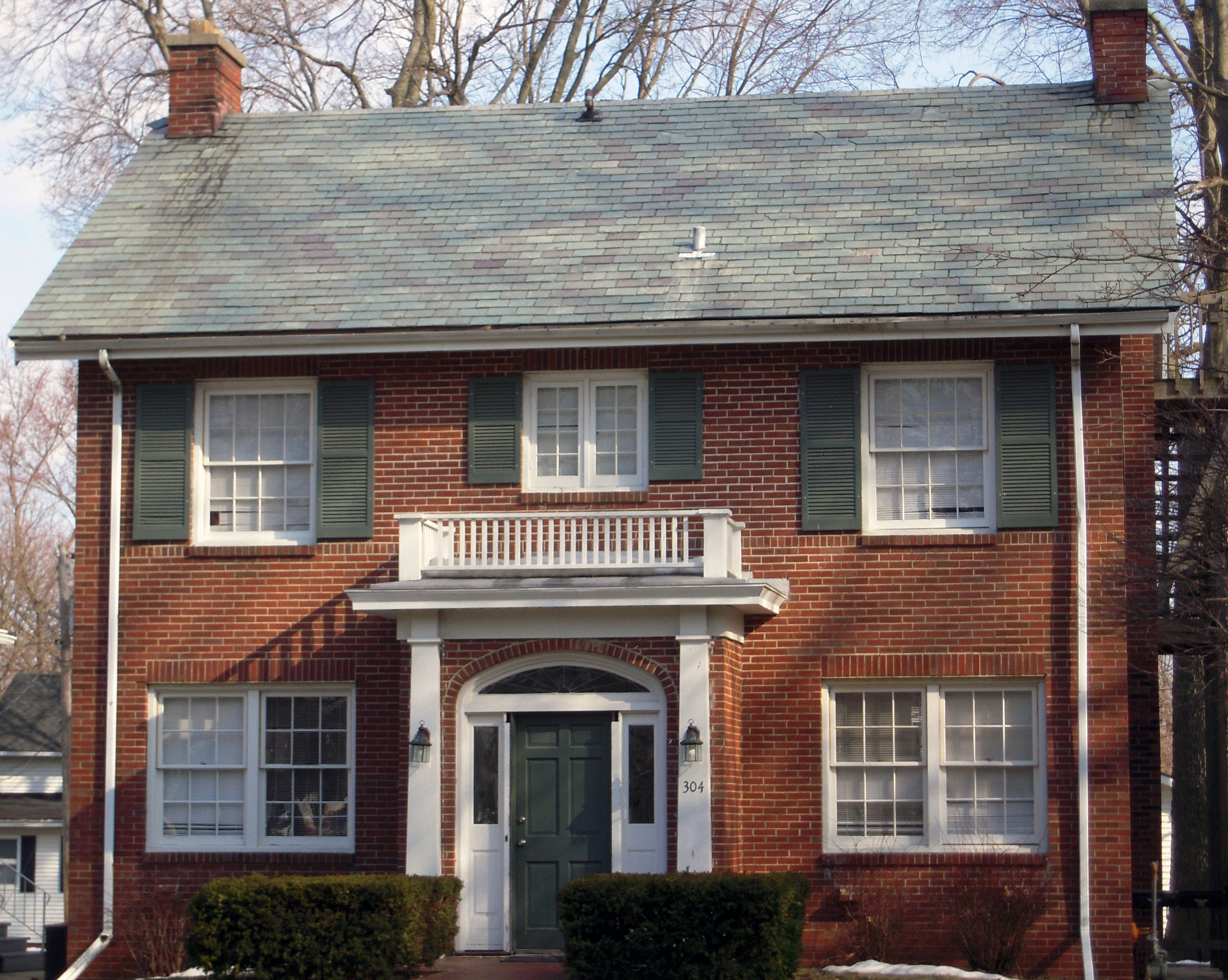
Colonial style

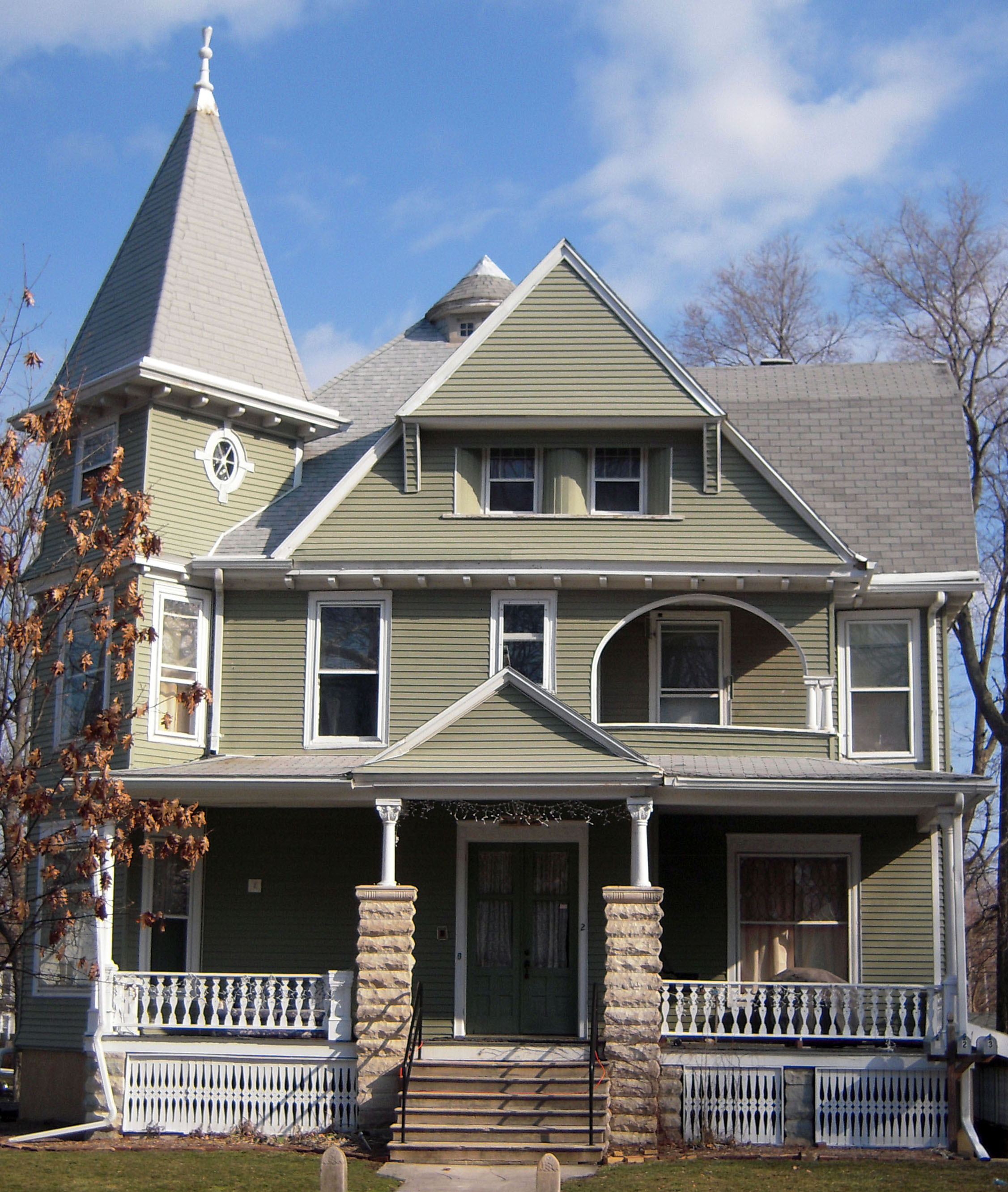
Lillard House
