= Tremont =

Tremont may refer to:

== Places ==
- Tremont, Victoria, a suburb of Melbourne, Australia
- Tremont, Nova Scotia, Canada

=== United States ===
- Tremont, Illinois
- Tremont, Indiana
- Tremont, Maine
- Tremont, Mississippi
- Tremont, Bronx, New York
- Tremont, Cleveland, a neighborhood in Ohio
- Tremont City, Ohio
- Tremont Township, Pennsylvania
- Tremont, Tennessee, a region of the Great Smoky Mountains National Park in the southeastern United States
- Tremont Street, a major thoroughfare in Boston, Massachusetts
- Tremont Avenue, a street in the Bronx, New York
- Boston, Massachusetts, originally called "Trimountaine" or "Tremont"

== Surname ==
- Auguste Trémont (1892–1980), Luxembourgian sculptor
- Matt Tremont (born 1989), American professional wrestler
- Sonja Tremont Morgan (born 1963), American socialite, television personality and philanthropist

== Other uses ==
- Tremont (microarchitecture), microarchitecture successor to Goldmont Plus
- Tremont (horse), American Thoroughbred racehorse
- Tremont station (disambiguation), railroad stations
- Tremont Avenue (disambiguation), rapid transit stations
- Tremont Group, a US hedge fund
- Tremont Stakes, American Thoroughbred horse race
- Tremont House (Collingwood, Ontario), a historic building in Collingwood, Ontario, Canada
- Trémont (disambiguation)
