= 169th Street station =

169th Street may refer to:

- 169th Street (IND Queens Boulevard Line), a local station on the IND Queens Boulevard Line
- 169th Street (IRT Third Avenue Line), a station on the demolished IRT Third Avenue Line
