= 133rd Street station =

New York City Subway station in The Bronx (closed 1955)

133rd St.

General information
- Location: East 133rd Street between Alexander and Willis Avenues; Port Morris, The Bronx, New York
- Coordinates: 40°48′24.5″N 73°55′32.9″W
- System: Former Manhattan Railway elevated station
- Operator: Interborough Rapid Transit Company; City of New York (1940–1953); New York City Transit Authority
- Line: Third Avenue Line
- Platforms: 1 island platform
- Tracks: 2

Construction
- Structure type: Elevated

History
- Opened: May 17, 1886; 140 years ago
- Closed: June 11, 1940; 86 years ago (2nd Ave.); May 12, 1955; 71 years ago (3rd Ave.)

Former services
Preceding station	Interborough Rapid Transit	Following station
138th Street toward Bronx Park	Second Avenue Express	129th Street toward City Hall
138th Street toward Bronx Park	Third Avenue Local-Express	129th Street toward City Hall
Location

The 133rd Street station was a station on the IRT Third Avenue Line in the Bronx, New York City. It was originally opened on May 17, 1886, by the Suburban Rapid Transit Company, and was the first stop in the Bronx after crossing the Harlem River. It had two tracks and one island platform, and was also the terminus of the Third Avenue Line until May 23, 1886, when it was expanded to 143rd Street. Besides Third Avenue Line trains, it was also served by trains of the IRT Second Avenue Line until June 11, 1940, when Second Avenue service ended. This station closed on May 12, 1955, with the ending of all service on the Third Avenue El south of 149th Street.
