= 138th Street =

138th Street may refer to:

- Third Avenue–138th Street station, on the IRT Pelham Line of the New York City Subway
- 138th Street–Grand Concourse station, on the IRT Jerome Avenue Line of the New York City Subway
- 138th Street station (IRT Third Avenue Line), demolished, New York
- 138th Street station (New York Central Railroad)
- "138th Street", a song by The Walkmen from the 2004 album Bows + Arrows
