= Claremont Park =

Public park in the Bronx, New York

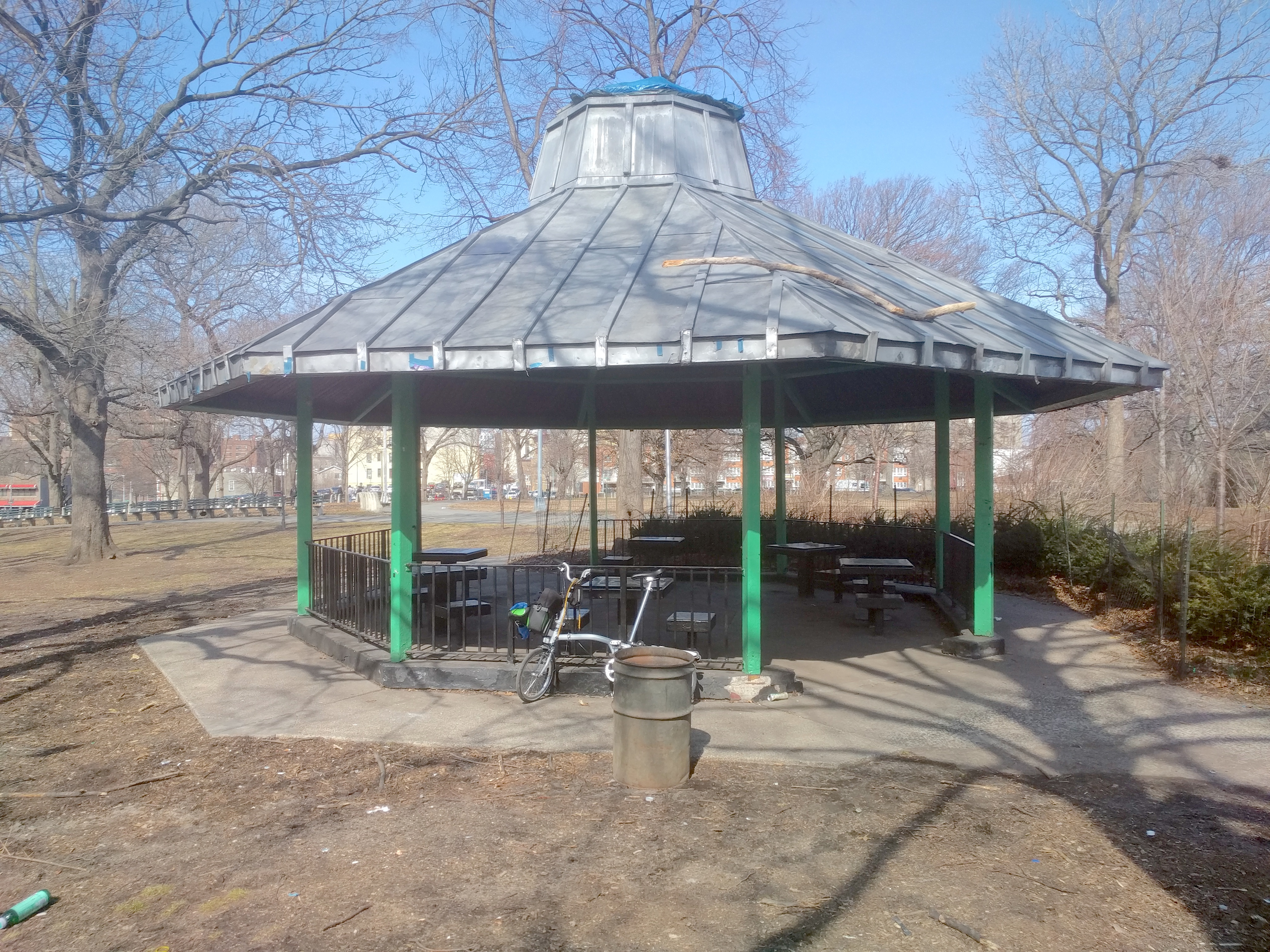
- The gazebo
- Interactive map of Claremont Park
- Coordinates: 40°50′27″N 73°54′27″W
- Area: 38 acres (15 ha)
- Created: 1884
- Operator: New York City Department of Parks and Recreation
- Status: Open all year

Claremont Park is a park in the Morrisania section of the Bronx in New York City. The land on which the park sits was once part of the Morris family estate and was the site of the Zborowski Mansion. After becoming a municipal park in 1884 as part of the New Parks Act, the mansion was used for a time as the Bronx headquarters for the Department of Parks and was torn down in 1938.

== Description ==
Claremont Park is a 38-acre (15 ha) park in the Morrisania section of the Bronx. Roughly triangular, The New York Times once described as "ham-shaped". The park is bordered by East Mount Eden Avenue (previously known as Belmont Street) on the north, by Morris and Teller Avenues on the west, and by East 170th Street and Clay Avenue on the east. It sits atop a ridge which overlooks the modern Webster Avenue; at one time this had been Mill Brook (also known as Saw Mill Creek), which no longer exists.

The park includes handball and basketball courts, baseball fields, playgrounds, and barbecue areas. There are also two outdoor pools; a large one for swimming, and a smaller wading pool. There is a gazebo, which was built in 1938 when the Claremont Mansion was torn down. One block east of Claremont Park is the .55-acre (0.22 ha) Little Claremont Playground, also known as Claremont Community Park. The playground is part of PS 42.

== History ==
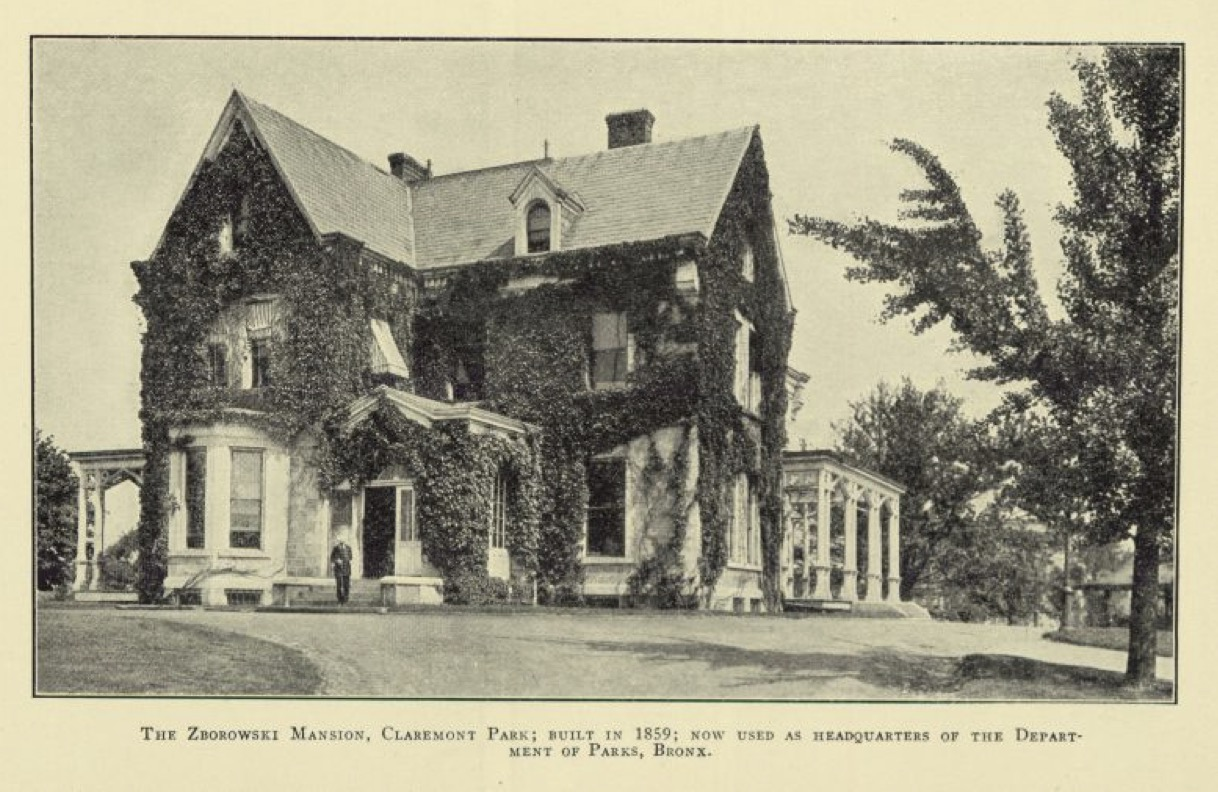
The Zborowski Mansion, in use as the headquarters of the Department of Parks, Bronx.

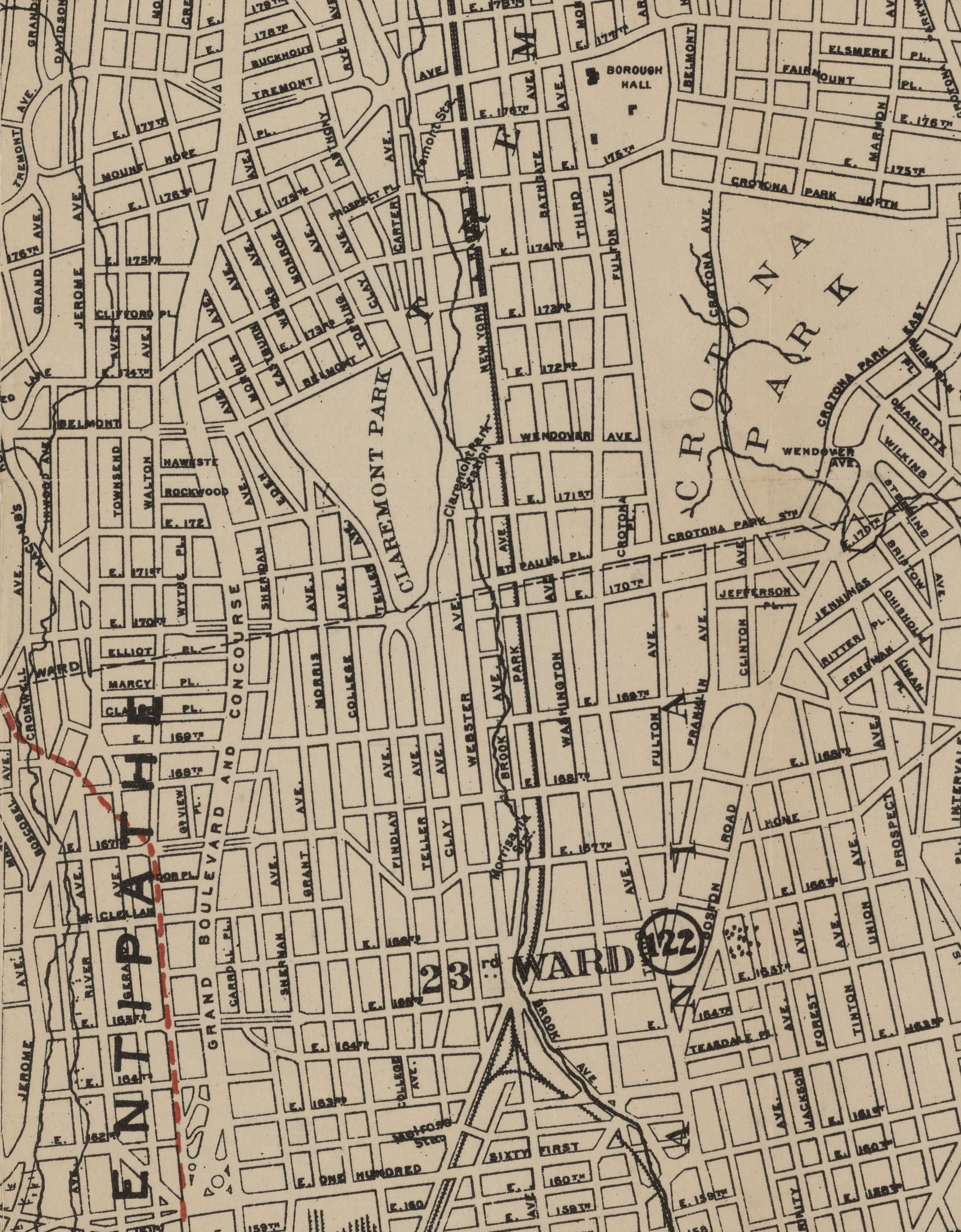
1912 map. Mill Brook runs along Webster Avenue and the eponymous Brook Avenue. Also visible is Claremont Park Station. Neither the brook nor the rail station exist anymore.

The land which became Claremont Park was part of the Morris family estate from 1679 to 1848, when Gouverneur Morris II sold a parcel in the northern part of the property to Elliott and Anna Zborowski de Montsaulain. The couple built Claremont Mansion (later known as Zborowski Mansion) on the land in 1859, establishing for the first time the name Claremont for this area.

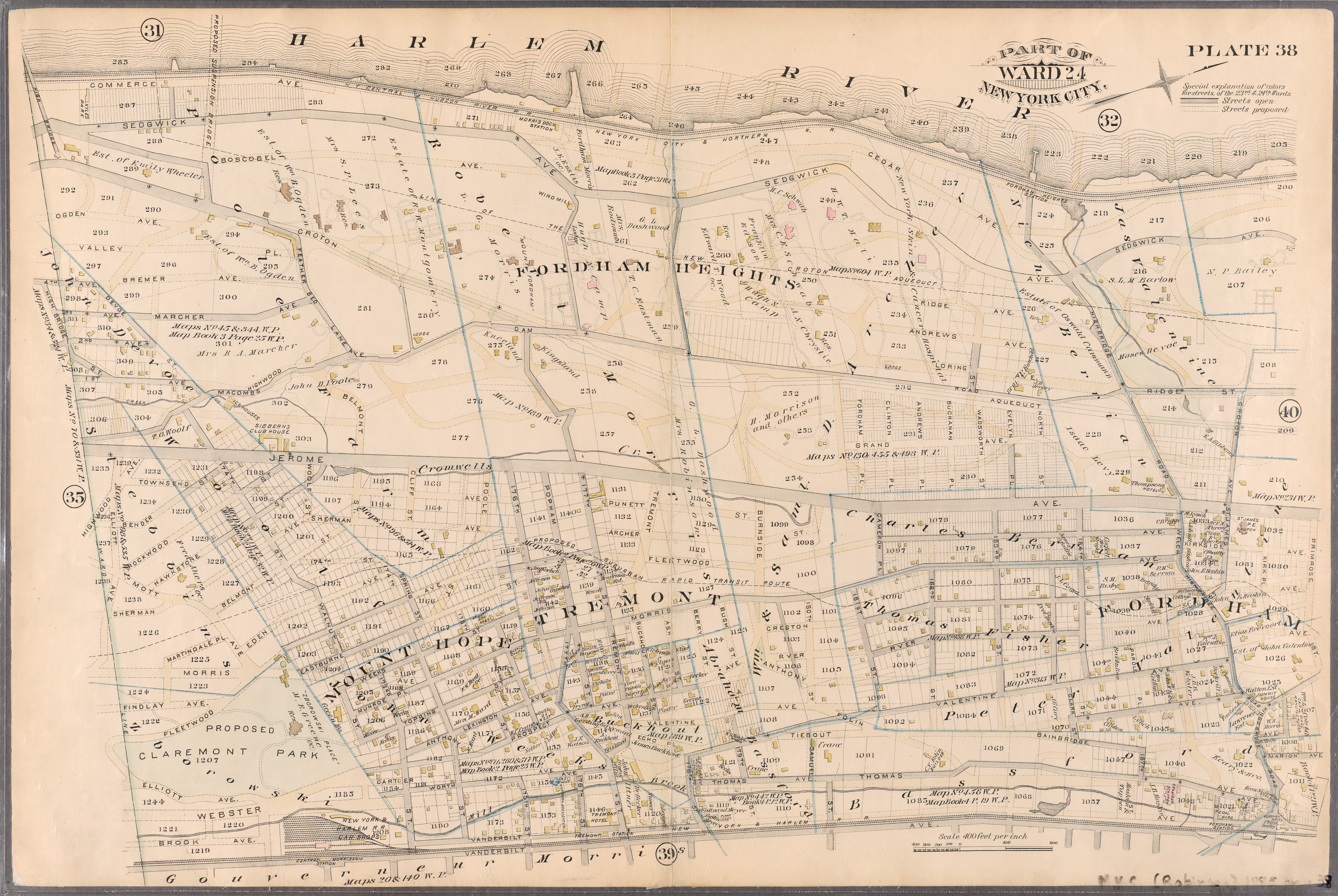
1885 map showing proposed Claremont Park (lower-left of image)

In 1884, the New Parks Act was passed, which led to the purchase of land by the city to create the 6 major parks in the borough: Claremont, Crotona, Van Cortlandt, Bronx, St. Mary's, and Pelham Bay. The Zborowski mansion was used by the Parks Department as their Bronx headquarters until it was moved to the Ranaqua section of Bronx Park. In the ensuing years, additional parts of the Zborowski (Note: The family name was originally Zaborowskij. Over the years, many variations in spelling were used; the two most common relevant to the history of Claremont Park being Zborowski and Zabriskie. The family history by George Olin Zabriskie lists 123 known variations.) estate in the vicinity of Claremont Park continued to be sold. In 1888, 110 lots were offered for sale, of which 97 were ultimately sold, for an aggregate price of $73,000. A further 250 lots of the estate were sold in 1897, for $200,000.

In 1889, Claremont Park, along with a nearby horse racing track called Fleetwood Park, was considered as a possible site for a 1892 World's Fair. The fair was to be the International Columbian Exposition, celebrating the 400th anniversary of Christopher Columbus finding the new world. The alternative locations in New York were Inwood, Oak Point-Barretto Point, Port Morris, Cedar Park, and Morningside Park-Riverside Park-Bloomingdale Asylum. In 1890, however, the US Congress designated Chicago as the host city for the exposition.

A 1904 letter to the editor of The New York Times complained about electrical wiring having been strung through the park to bring power to the Claremont Mansion, which at that time was being used as the headquarters for the Bronx Parks Department. The writer also complained about excessive noise from the park due to sporting events and Sunday concerts.

The New York Central Railroad (now known as the Harlem line of Metro North Railroad) ran one block east of the Zborowski estate, with a station known as Central Morrisania directly across from the property. The name was changed to Claremont Park Station on June 1, 1891. The station was permanently closed in 1960.

A geological oddity of Claremont Park was a small but deep lake known as the "Black Swamp", which had a reputation for swallowing up livestock. The Native Americans who lived in the area believed it to be inhabited by evil spirits. Early European settlers were also aware of the danger, erecting a fence around it to prevent cattle from falling in. In 1904, a project to extend Morris Avenue past Claremont Park ran into problems when a horse and cart carrying fill intended to be dumped into the lake sank into the water. It was estimated that over 60,000 cubic yards (46,000 m^{3}) of fill were dumped into the lake before the job was finished.

A collapse of a porch of the mansion led to 26 people being injured in 1909. An afternoon rainstorm caused about 100 people who were in the park to seek shelter on the porch, leading to a structural collapse and the people being dropped 15 feet into a cellar.

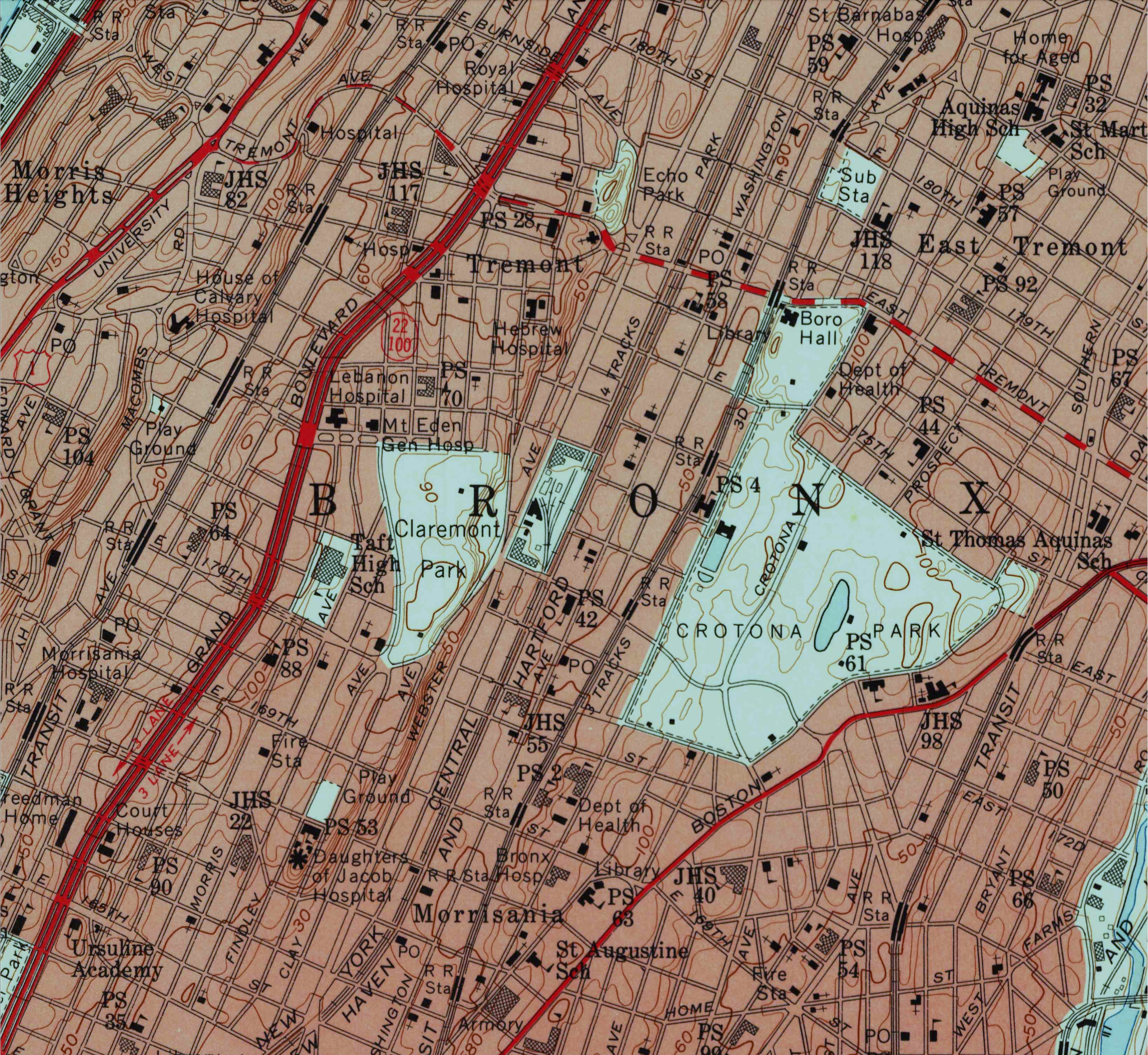
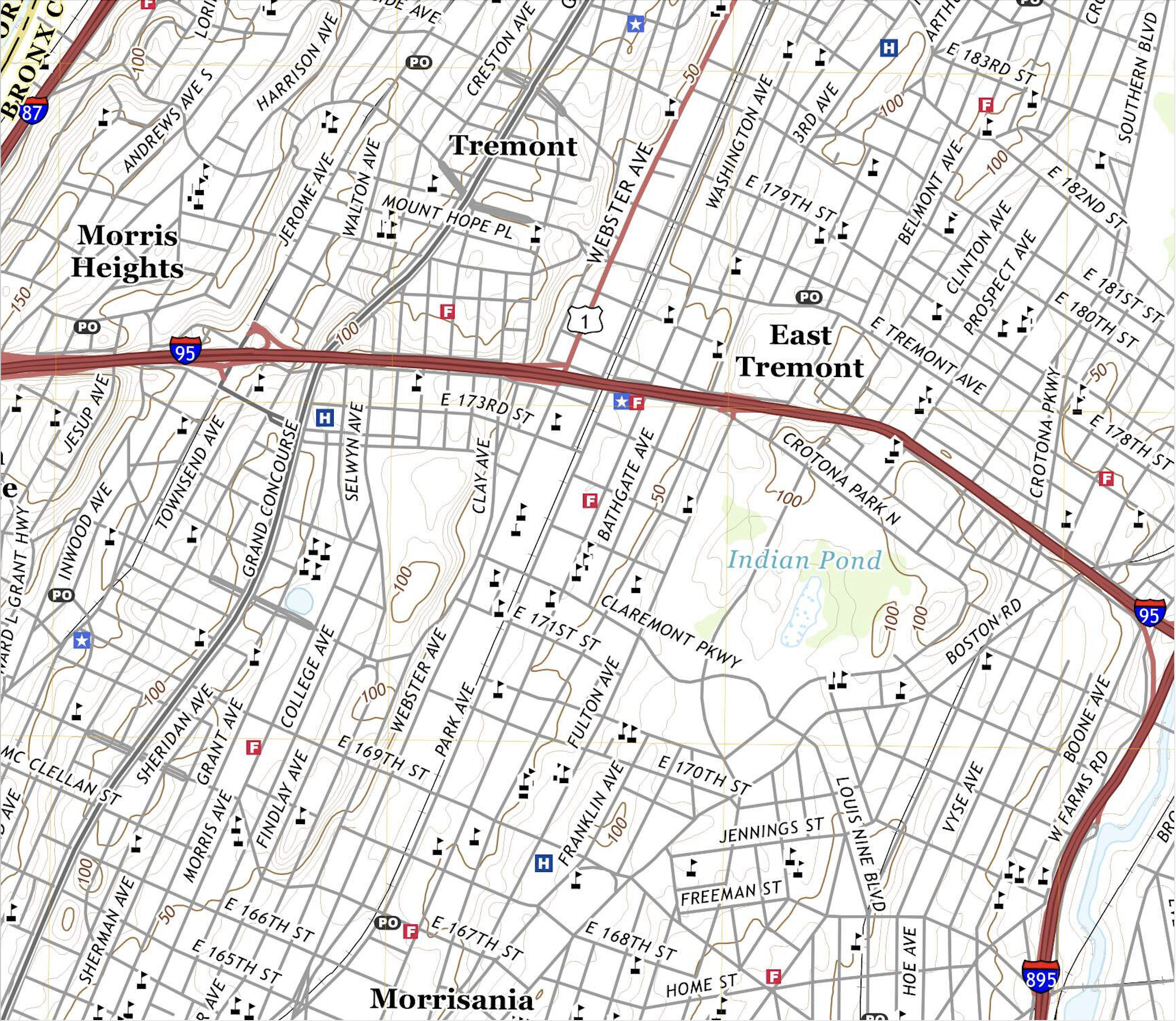
US Geologic Survey Topographic maps (1956 left, 2019 right) showing approximately the same area including Claremont and Crotona Parks. 2019 map shows the Cross-Bronx Expressway (I-95) which was built after the 1956 map was drawn.

== Additional reading ==
- Zabriskie, George Olin (1963). The Zabriskie family; a three hundred and one year history of the descendants of Albrecht Zaborowskij (ca. 1638–1711) of Bergen County, New Jersey. Salt Lake City, Utah: Publishers Press. LCCN 63021602 – via Internet Archive.
- "The Zborowski mansion, Claremont Park, Bronx, N.Y., undated [c. 1903]". New York Heritage Digital Collections.
