= 161st Street station =

161st Street station may refer to:

- 161st Street (IRT Third Avenue Line), a local station on the demolished IRT Third Avenue Line
- 161st Street–Yankee Stadium (New York City Subway), a station complex served by the IRT Jerome Avenue Line and the IND Concourse Line
