= 143rd Street station =

New York City Subway station in The Bronx (closed 1955)

143rd St.

General information
- Location: East 143rd Street between Alexander and Willis Avenues; Mott Haven, The Bronx, New York
- Coordinates: 40°48′44.7″N 73°55′18.5″W
- System: Former Manhattan Railway elevated station
- Operator: Interborough Rapid Transit Company; City of New York (1940–1953); New York City Transit Authority
- Line: Third Avenue Line
- Platforms: 1 island platform
- Tracks: 2

Construction
- Structure type: Elevated

History
- Opened: May 23, 1886; 140 years ago
- Closed: May 12, 1955; 71 years ago

Former services
Preceding station	Interborough Rapid Transit	Following station
149th Street toward Bronx Park	Second Avenue Express	138th Street toward City Hall
Jackson Avenue (rush hours) (1917–1946) toward Freeman Street	Second Avenue Express	138th Street toward City Hall
149th Street toward Bronx Park	Third Avenue Local-Express	138th Street toward City Hall
Location

The 143rd Street station was a station on the demolished IRT Third Avenue Line in the Bronx, New York City. It was originally opened on May 23, 1886, by the Suburban Rapid Transit Company, one week after replacing the recently opened 133rd Street station as the northern terminus of the Third Avenue Line. This station had two tracks and one island platform, and was also served by trains of the IRT Second Avenue Line until June 11, 1940. This station closed on May 12, 1955, with the ending of all service on the Third Avenue El south of 149th Street.
