= Fordham Road–190th Street station =

New York City Subway station in the Bronx (closed 1973)

Fordham Road–190th Street
- Former New York City Subway station
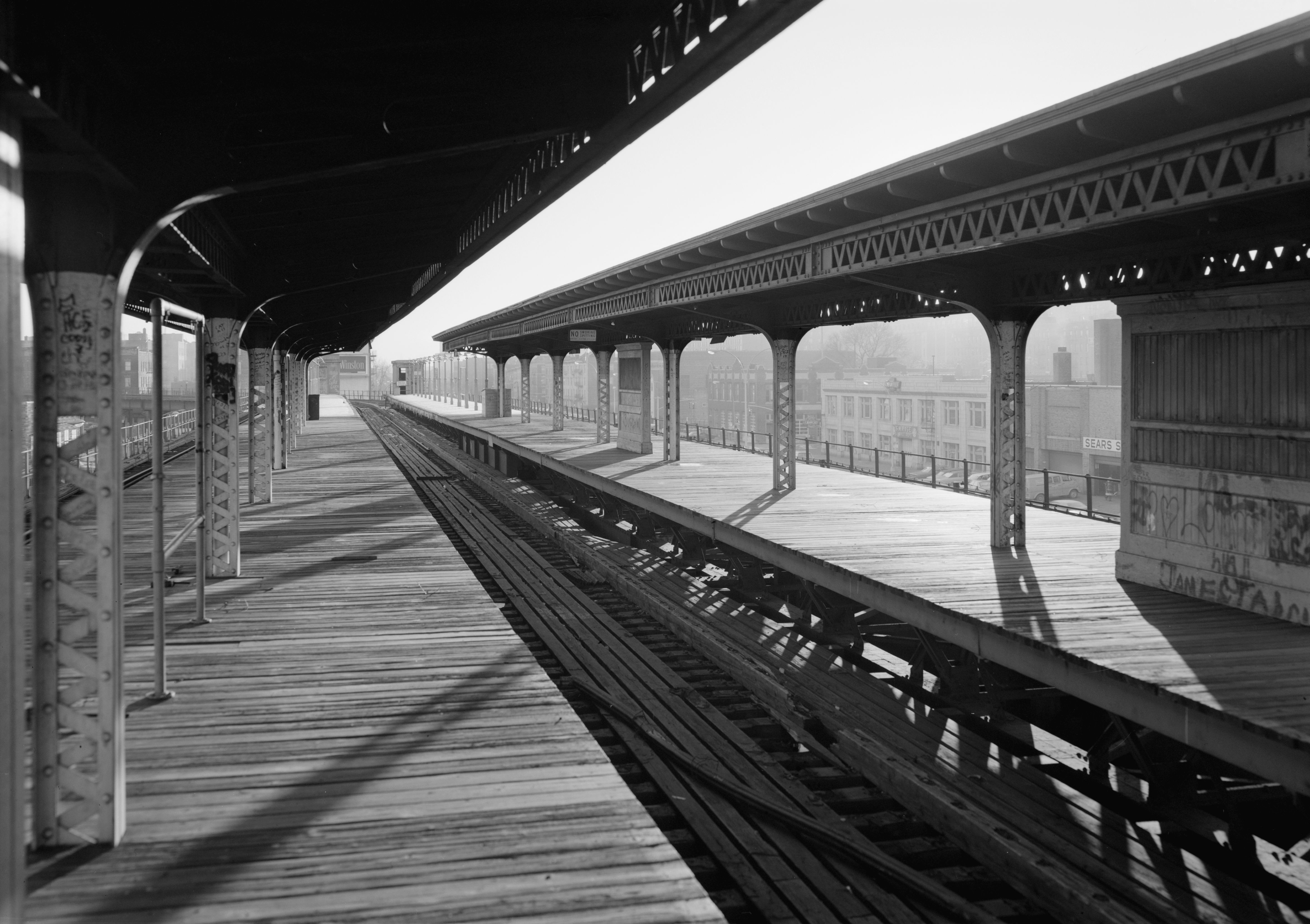
- Platforms at Fordham Road, showing right-of-way of the express track.

Station statistics
- Address: Third Avenue and Fordham Road; Bronx, New York 10458
- Borough: The Bronx
- Locale: Fordham, Fordham Plaza
- Coordinates: 40°51′39″N 73°53′27″W
- Division: A (IRT)
- Line: IRT Third Avenue Line
- Services: None
- Platforms: 2 island platforms
- Tracks: 3

Other information
- Opened: July 1, 1901; 125 years ago
- Closed: April 29, 1973; 53 years ago
- Former/other names: Pelham Avenue; Fordham Square
- Next north: Gun Hill Road (express); 200th Street (local); Bronx Park Terminal (Original; Botanical Garden Spur)
- Next south: 183rd Street (local); Tremont Avenue–177th Street (express)
Location
Location within New York City Subway
Location within New York City
Location within New York
Street map
Station service legend
| Symbol | Description |
| Stops all times | Stops in station at all times |
| Stops all times except late nights | Stops all times except late nights |
| Stops late nights only | Stops late nights only |
| Stops late nights and weekends | Stops late nights and weekends only |
| Stops weekdays during the day | Stops weekdays during the day |
| Stops weekends during the day | Stops weekends during the day |
| Stops all times except rush hours in the peak direction | Stops all times except rush hours in the peak direction |
| Stops all times except weekdays in the peak direction | Stops all times except weekdays in the peak direction |
| Stops daily except rush hours in the peak direction | Stops all times except nights and rush hours in the peak direction |
| Stops rush hours only | Stops rush hours only |
| Stops rush hours in the peak direction only | Stops rush hours in the peak direction only |
| Station closed | Station is closed |
(Details about time periods)

The Fordham Road–190th Street station was an express station on the demolished IRT Third Avenue Line in the Bronx, New York City. It was located at Fordham Road and Third Avenue, one block east of Webster Avenue, in the modern location of Fordham Plaza. Opened in 1901, the station was closed in 1973 and demolished in 1977 along with the rest of the Third Avenue Line. No trace of the station exists today.

== History ==
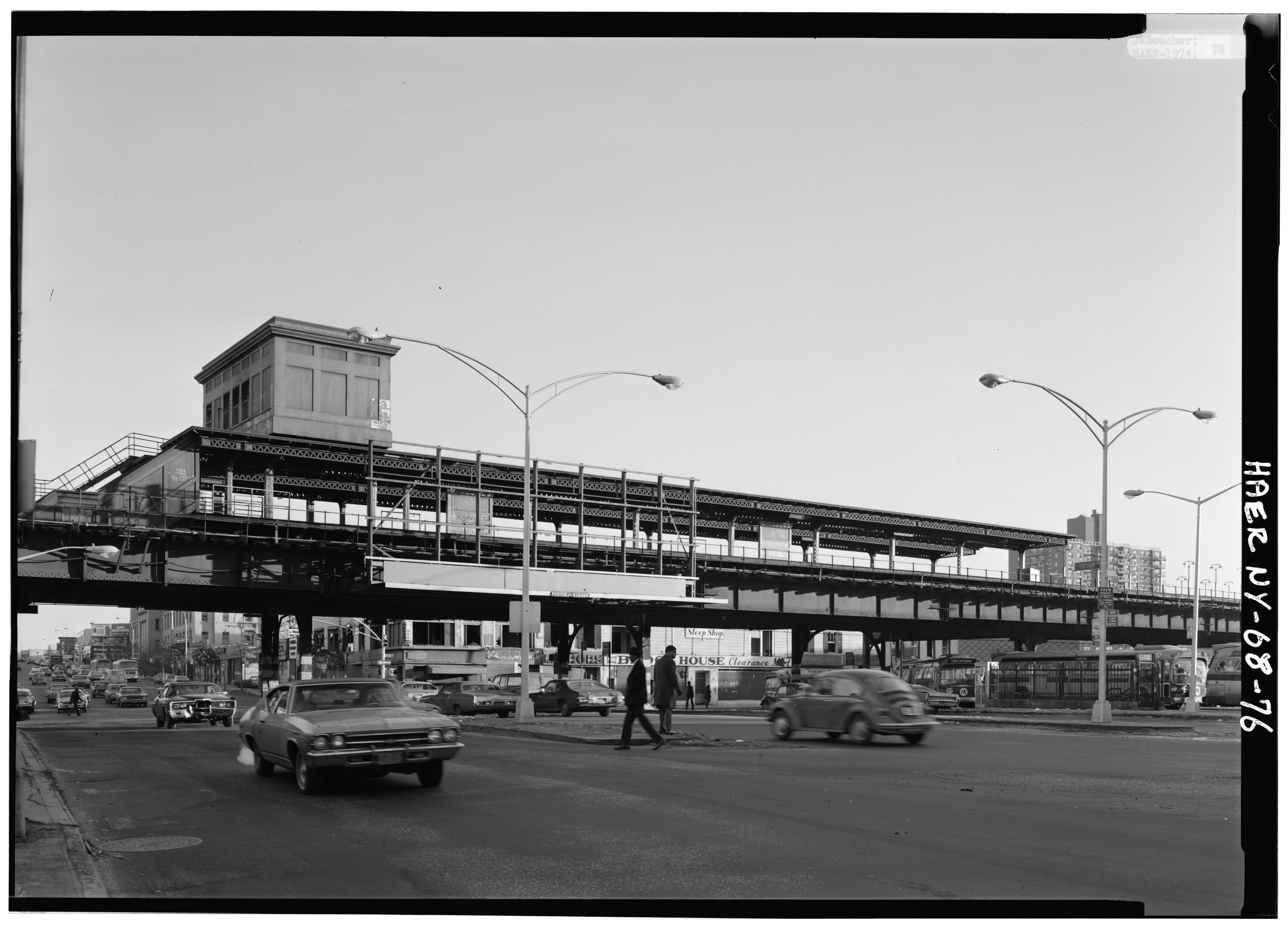

An extension of the Third Avenue El to Fordham Square (now Fordham Plaza) was proposed in 1894. The station opened on July 1, 1901, as part of a three station extension of the line north of Tremont Avenue–177th Street. It was originally called Pelham Avenue, the former name of Fordham Road and Pelham Parkway. It served as a major transfer point to what is today the Metro-North Railroad's Harlem and New Haven Lines at the Fordham station, and St. John's College (now the main Rose Hill campus of Fordham University). This station served as the terminus of the line until May 21, 1902, when it was extended to Bronx Park Terminal. Between 1913 and 1916 under the Dual Contracts, a third track was added to the line to facilitate express service. Express service began on January 17, 1916. A second extension to Gun Hill Road along Webster Avenue was also built during the Dual Contracts, opening in 1920.

The station had three tracks and two island platforms, situated on the west side of Third Avenue. North of the station, the mainline curved from Third Avenue onto Webster Avenue, while the stub line towards Bronx Park ran along the western edge of the Fordham campus parallel to the Metro-North tracks. The split occurred at an at-grade junction at about East 194th Street. The next local stop to the north was either Bronx Park (closed in 1951) or 200th Street. The next express stop to the north was the terminus of the line at Gun Hill Road. The next stop to the south was 183rd Street for local trains and Tremont Avenue–177th Street for express trains.

In the 1970s, the city planned to close the elevated line, which was dilapidated and blamed for blight and ills in the borough. The station closed on April 29, 1973. The structure was demolished by 1977. Service to the station and along the Third Avenue corridor was replaced by Bx55 buses.

== Current status ==
From 1973 to 2013, the Bx55 limited bus replaced elevated service between The Hub and Gun Hill Road. In 2013, the Bx55 was eliminated, replaced by the Bx15 limited bus which terminates at Fordham Plaza. Service to Gun Hill Road is provided by the Bx41 Select Bus Service route along Webster Avenue.

Currently, the station site is occupied by Fordham Plaza, a major bus hub and commercial center. While the plaza has existed in some form since the 1910s, the current plaza was constructed in the mid-1990s, and has been undergoing reconstruction since 2014. The closest subway stop to the former station is Fordham Road on the IND Concourse Line six blocks west.
