= Morrisania station =

New York Central Railroad's Harlem Line station (closed 1973)

Morrisania
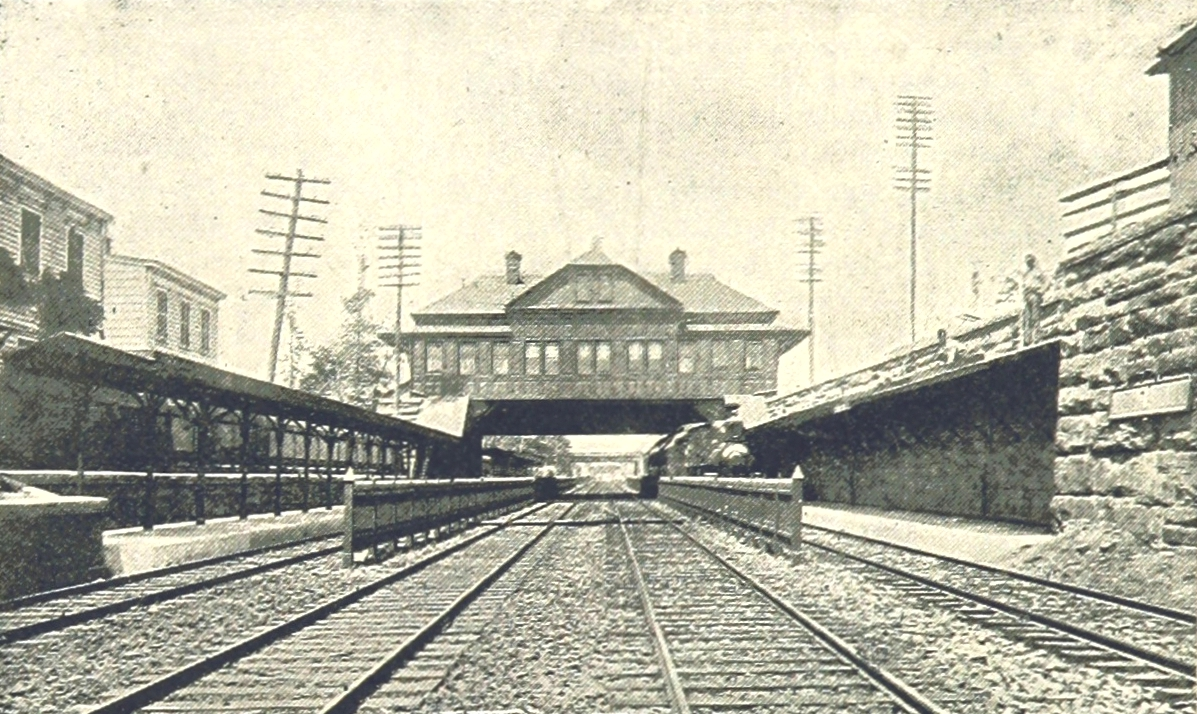
- An 1893 view of Morrisania station of the New York Central Railroad

General information
- Location: Park Avenue and 168th Street; Morrisania, Bronx, New York
- Coordinates: 40.831837°N 73.908265°W
- Line: Harlem Line
- Platforms: 2 side
- Tracks: 4

History
- Opened: 1858 (168 years ago)
- Closed: July 2, 1973 (53 years ago)

Former services
Preceding station	New York Central Railroad	Following station
Melrose toward New York	Harlem Division	Claremont Park toward Chatham
Location

The Morrisania station was a station on the New York Central Railroad's Harlem Line, serving the community of Morrisania in the Bronx, New York City.

== History ==
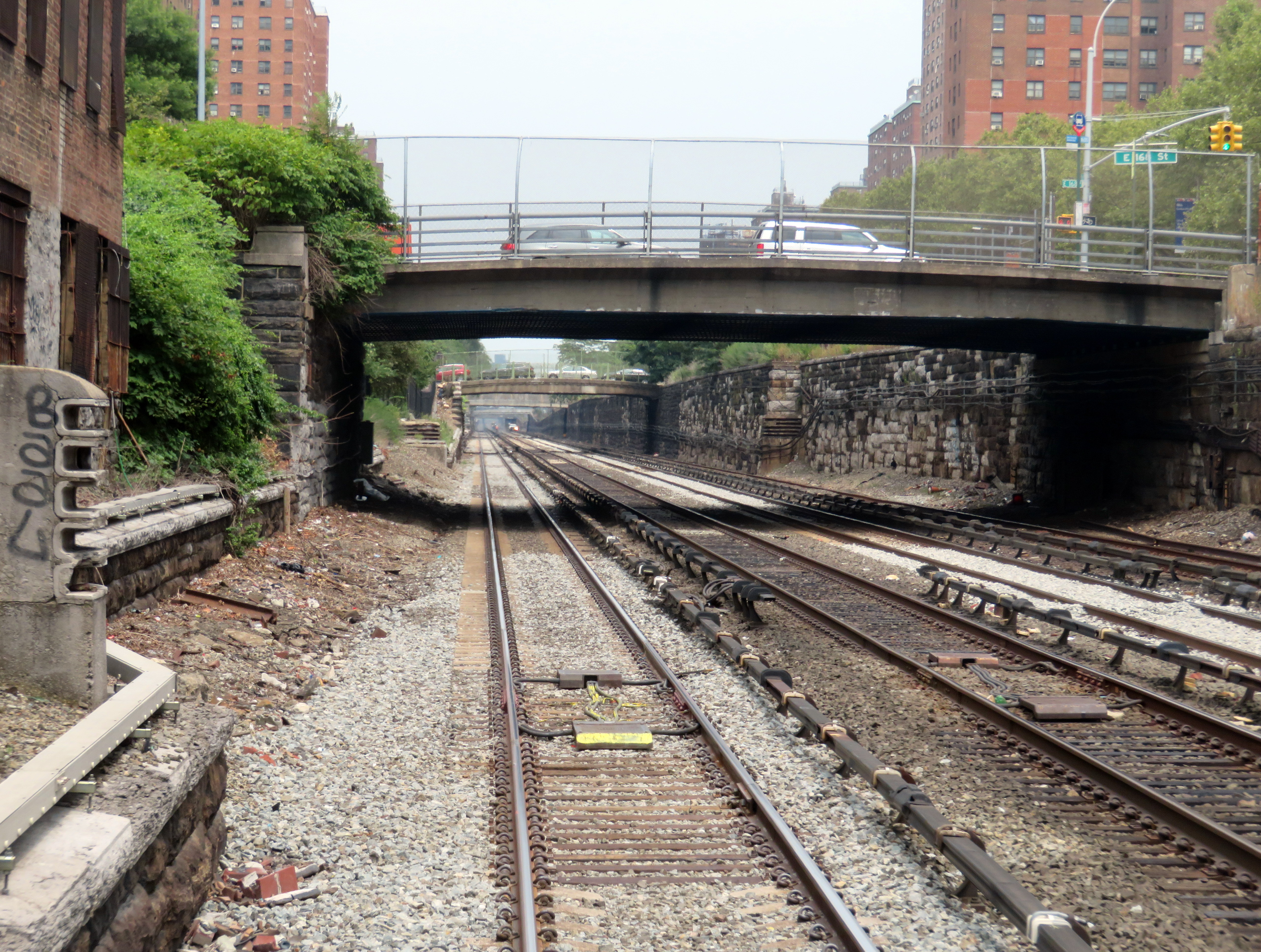
Former locations of the station platforms in 2019

The station was built in 1858, but after declining ridership, which paralleled the decline of this section of the Bronx, the station was closed in 1973 along with some other stations in the Bronx as well as all stations between Dover Plains and Chatham. The station had two side platforms, and was a local station on the four-track Harlem Line. The station was located at 168th Street and Park Avenue.

Originally, the station had a brick station house over the tracks on the tracks on the south side of the 168th Street bridge. Prior to the elimination of grade-crossings, the surface station had been located at 167th Street. There was no ticket agent at the station toward the end of its use. In 1964, only 40 daily commuters used the station. The New York Central Railroad was authorized to demolish the station in 1959. The station closed on July 2, 1973 along with several other stations in Penn Central's Metropolitan Region.
