= 183rd Street station (IRT Third Avenue Line) =

Train station in the Bronx, New York City

183rd Street
- Former New York City Subway station
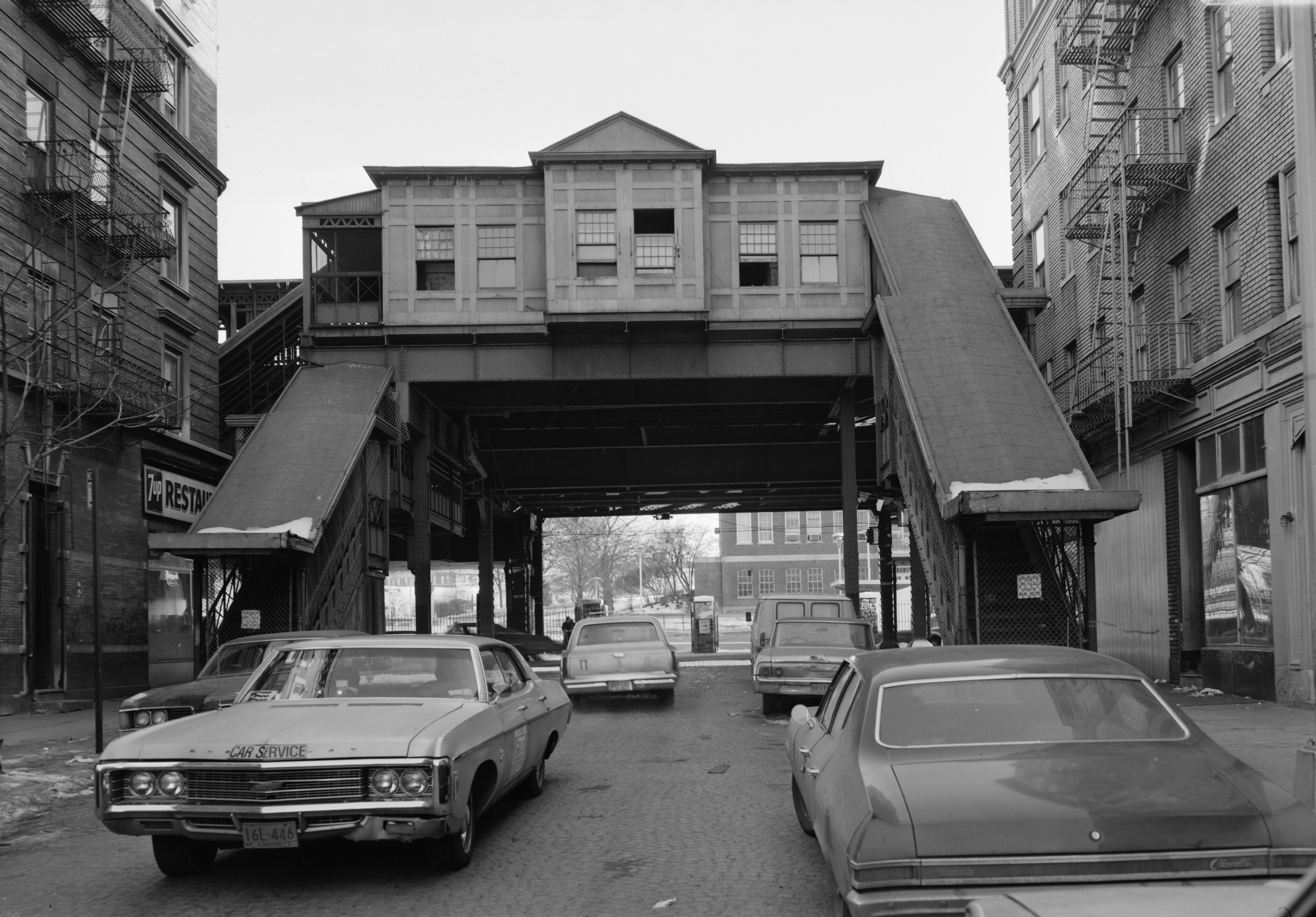
- The 183rd Street station, shortly before the demolition of the Third Avenue El.

Station statistics
- Address: East 183rd Street and 3rd Avenue; Bronx, New York 10457
- Borough: The Bronx
- Locale: Belmont
- Coordinates: 40°51′15″N 73°53′27″W
- Division: A (IRT)
- Line: IRT Third Avenue Line
- Services: None
- Platforms: 2 side platforms
- Tracks: 3

Other information
- Opened: July 1, 1901; 125 years ago
- Closed: April 29, 1973; 53 years ago
- Next north: Fordham Road–190th Street
- Next south: 180th Street
Location
Location within New York City Subway
Location within New York City
Location within New York
Street map
Station service legend
Symbol	Description
Stops all times	Stops in station at all times
Stops all times except late nights	Stops all times except late nights
Stops late nights only	Stops late nights only
Stops late nights and weekends	Stops late nights and weekends only
Stops weekdays during the day	Stops weekdays during the day
Stops weekends during the day	Stops weekends during the day
Stops all times except rush hours in the peak direction	Stops all times except rush hours in the peak direction
Stops all times except weekdays in the peak direction	Stops all times except weekdays in the peak direction
Stops daily except rush hours in the peak direction	Stops all times except nights and rush hours in the peak direction
Stops rush hours only	Stops rush hours only
Stops rush hours in the peak direction only	Stops rush hours in the peak direction only
Station closed	Station is closed
(Details about time periods)

The 183rd Street station was a local station on the demolished IRT Third Avenue Line in the Bronx, New York City. It was opened on July 1, 1901, and was one of three stations built when the line was extended to Fordham Plaza. It had three tracks and two side platforms. The station was located near what is today Saint Barnabas Hospital Pediatrics, and was five blocks east of the former New York Central Railroad station of the same name along the Harlem Line. The next stop to the north was Fordham Road–190th Street. The next stop to the south was 180th Street. The station closed on April 29, 1973. This station was very famous for Dondi's "Children of the Grave: Part II"
