= Trémont =

Trémont may refer to the following places in France:

- Trémont, Maine-et-Loire, a commune in the Maine-et-Loire department
- Trémont, Orne, a commune in the Orne department
- Trémont-sur-Saulx, a commune in the Meuse département

== See also ==
- Tremont (disambiguation)
