= Tremont Avenue (disambiguation) =

Tremont Avenue may refer to:

- Tremont Avenue, a street in The Bronx, New York

Any of several New York City Subway stations:

- Tremont Avenue (IND Concourse Line), serving the B and D trains
- Tremont Avenue–177th Street (IRT Third Avenue Line), now demolished
- West Farms Square–East Tremont Avenue (IRT White Plains Road Line), serving the 2 and 5 train
- Westchester Square–East Tremont Avenue (IRT Pelham Line), serving the 6 and <6> trains
