= Tremont station =

Tremont station may refer to:

- Tremont station (Charlotte), a former Charlotte Trolley station in Charlotte, North Carolina
- Tremont station (Indiana), a former station on the South Shore Line in Indiana
- Tremont station (Massachusetts), a former train station in Tremont, Massachusetts

Several are in Bronx, New York:

- Tremont station (Metro-North) a railroad station
- Tremont Avenue station, a subway station on the IND Concourse Line
- Tremont Avenue–177th Street station, a former subway station on the IRT Third Avenue Line
- West Farms Square–East Tremont Avenue station, a subway station on the IRT White Plains Road line
- Westchester Square–East Tremont Avenue station, a subway station on the IRT Pelham Line

== See also ==
- Tremont Street subway
