= 166th Street station =

New York City Subway station in the Bronx (closed 1973)

166th Street
- Former New York City Subway station
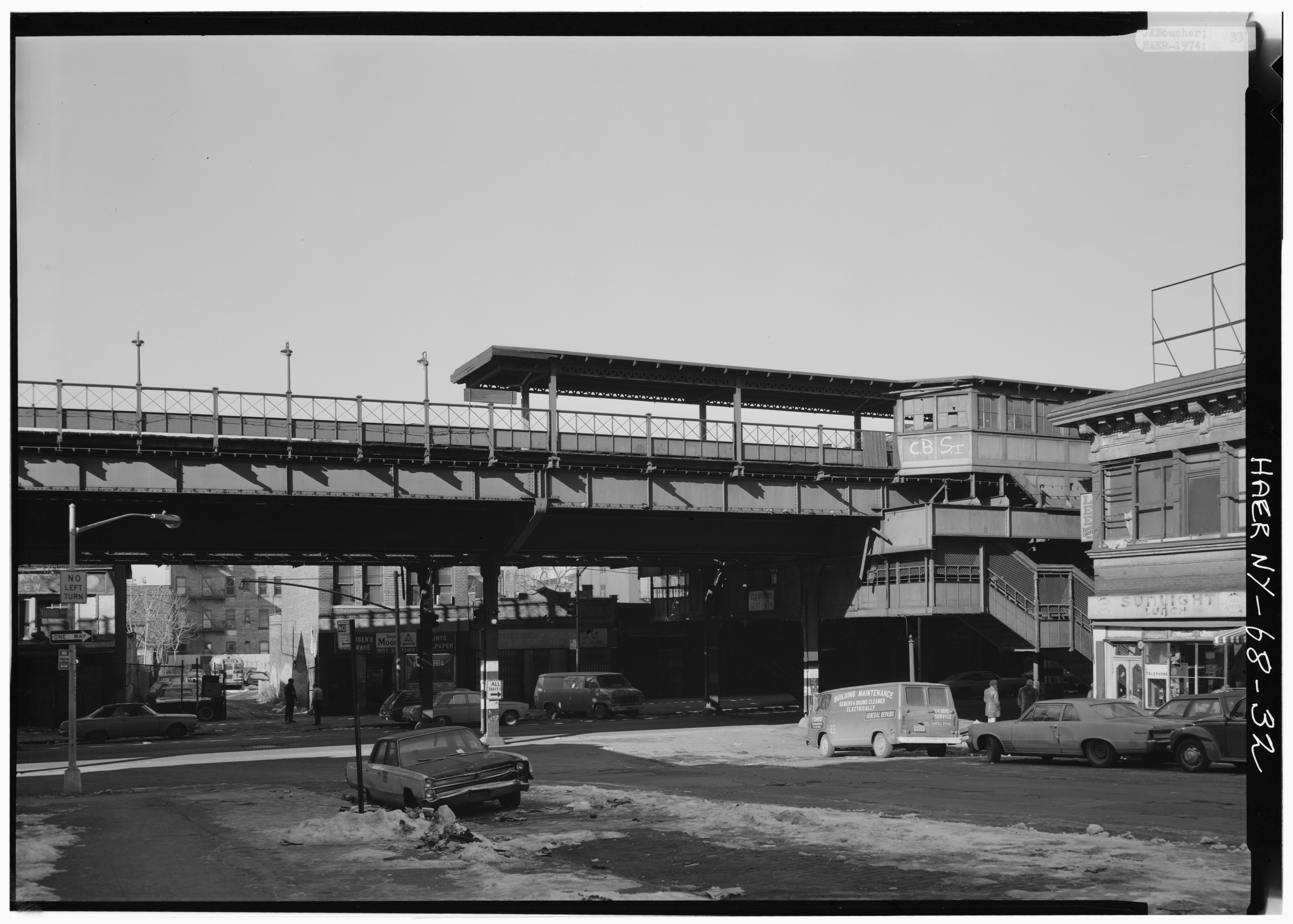

Station statistics
- Address: East 166th Street and 3rd Avenue; Bronx, New York 10456
- Borough: The Bronx
- Locale: Morrisania
- Coordinates: 40°49′42″N 73°54′25″W
- Division: A (IRT)
- Line: IRT Third Avenue Line
- Services: None
- Platforms: 2 side platforms
- Tracks: 3

Other information
- Opened: December 25, 1887; 138 years ago
- Closed: April 29, 1973; 53 years ago
- Next north: 169th Street
- Next south: 161st Street
Location
Location within New York City Subway
Location within New York City
Location within New York
Street map
Station service legend
Symbol	Description
Stops all times	Stops in station at all times
Stops all times except late nights	Stops all times except late nights
Stops late nights only	Stops late nights only
Stops late nights and weekends	Stops late nights and weekends only
Stops weekdays during the day	Stops weekdays during the day
Stops weekends during the day	Stops weekends during the day
Stops all times except rush hours in the peak direction	Stops all times except rush hours in the peak direction
Stops all times except weekdays in the peak direction	Stops all times except weekdays in the peak direction
Stops daily except rush hours in the peak direction	Stops all times except nights and rush hours in the peak direction
Stops rush hours only	Stops rush hours only
Stops rush hours in the peak direction only	Stops rush hours in the peak direction only
Station closed	Station is closed
(Details about time periods)

The 166th Street station was a local station on the demolished IRT Third Avenue Line in the Bronx, New York City. It was originally opened on December 25, 1887, by the Suburban Rapid Transit Company, and had three tracks and two side platforms. The next stop to the north was 169th Street. The next stop to the south was 161st Street. The station closed on April 29, 1973.

The train was notable at this station for arriving in front of the Franklin Avenue Armory and having views of Morris High School.
