= 174th Street station (IRT Third Avenue Line) =

New York City Subway station in the Bronx (closed 1973)

174th Street
- Former New York City Subway station
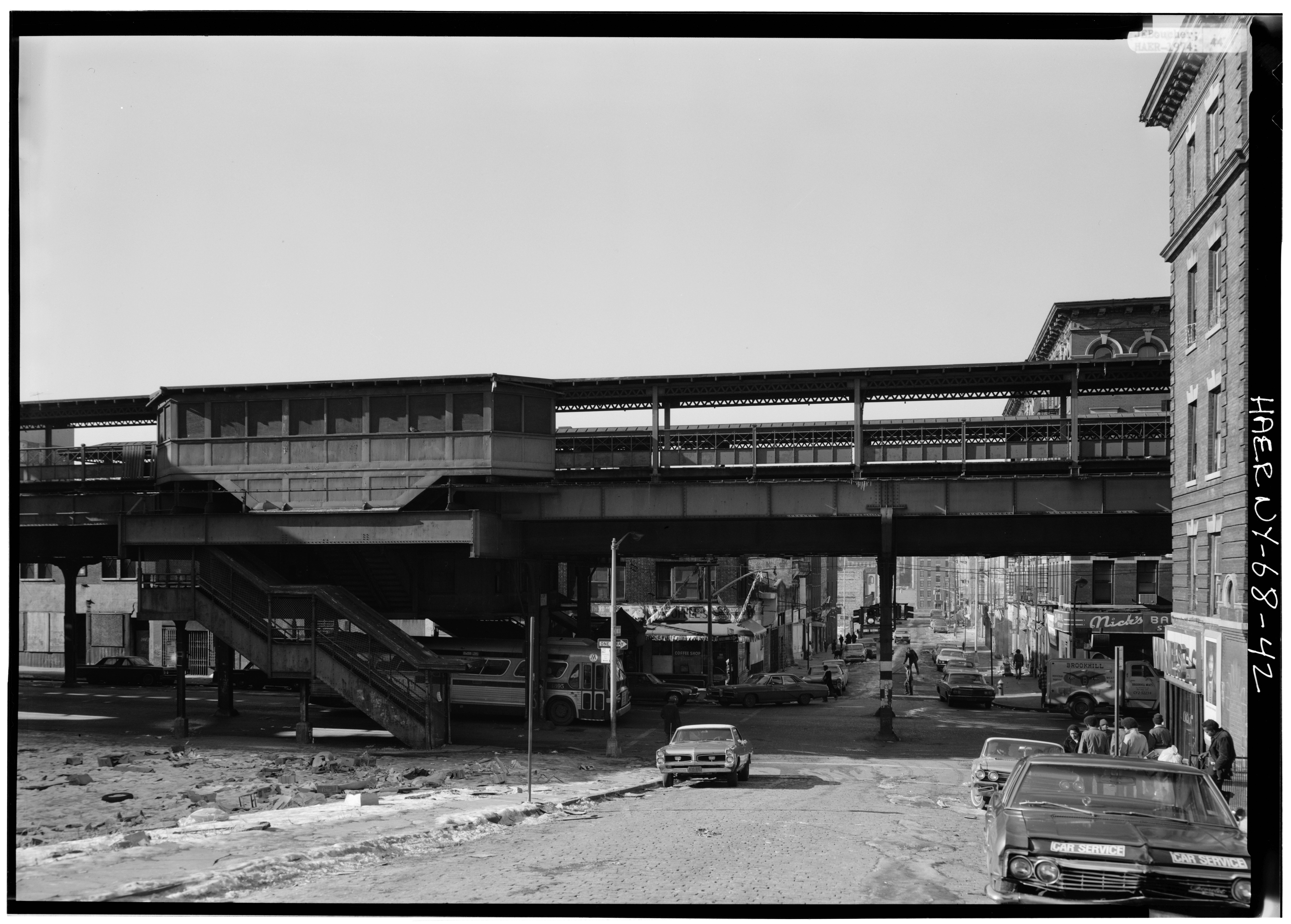
- Westbound view of the station from the street in 1974.

Station statistics
- Address: East 174th Street and 3rd Avenue; Bronx, New York 10457
- Borough: The Bronx
- Locale: East Morrisania
- Coordinates: 40°50′32.5″N 73°53′54″W
- Division: A (IRT)
- Line: IRT Third Avenue Line
- Services: None
- Platforms: 2 side platforms
- Tracks: 3

Other information
- Opened: July 20, 1891; 135 years ago
- Closed: April 29, 1973; 53 years ago
- Next north: Tremont Avenue–177th Street
- Next south: Claremont Parkway
Location
Location within New York City Subway
Location within New York City
Location within New York
Street map
Station service legend
Symbol	Description
Stops all times	Stops in station at all times
Stops all times except late nights	Stops all times except late nights
Stops late nights only	Stops late nights only
Stops late nights and weekends	Stops late nights and weekends only
Stops weekdays during the day	Stops weekdays during the day
Stops weekends during the day	Stops weekends during the day
Stops all times except rush hours in the peak direction	Stops all times except rush hours in the peak direction
Stops all times except weekdays in the peak direction	Stops all times except weekdays in the peak direction
Stops daily except rush hours in the peak direction	Stops all times except nights and rush hours in the peak direction
Stops rush hours only	Stops rush hours only
Stops rush hours in the peak direction only	Stops rush hours in the peak direction only
Station closed	Station is closed
(Details about time periods)

The 174th Street station was a local station on the demolished IRT Third Avenue Line in the Bronx, New York City. It was originally built on July 20, 1891, by the Suburban Rapid Transit Company and had three tracks and two side platforms. The next stop to the north was Tremont Avenue–177th Street, but in its last years it rose over the Cross Bronx Expressway in order to get there. The next stop to the south was Claremont Parkway. The station closed on April 29, 1973.
