= Claremont Parkway station =

New York City Subway station in the Bronx (closed 1973)

Claremont Parkway
- Former New York City Subway station

Station statistics
- Address: Claremont Parkway and 3rd Avenue; Bronx, New York 10457
- Borough: The Bronx
- Locale: Claremont
- Coordinates: 40°50′17.5″N 73°54′04″W
- Division: A (IRT)
- Line: IRT Third Avenue Line
- Services: None
- Platforms: 2 side platforms
- Tracks: 3

Other information
- Opened: September 19, 1888; 138 years ago
- Closed: April 29, 1973; 53 years ago
- Former/other names: Wendover Avenue; Claremont Parkway − Between 171st St. & 172nd St
- Next north: 174th Street
- Next south: 169th Street
Location
Location within New York City Subway
Location within New York City
Location within New York
Street map
Station service legend
Symbol	Description
Stops all times	Stops in station at all times
Stops all times except late nights	Stops all times except late nights
Stops late nights only	Stops late nights only
Stops late nights and weekends	Stops late nights and weekends only
Stops weekdays during the day	Stops weekdays during the day
Stops weekends during the day	Stops weekends during the day
Stops all times except rush hours in the peak direction	Stops all times except rush hours in the peak direction
Stops all times except weekdays in the peak direction	Stops all times except weekdays in the peak direction
Stops daily except rush hours in the peak direction	Stops all times except nights and rush hours in the peak direction
Stops rush hours only	Stops rush hours only
Stops rush hours in the peak direction only	Stops rush hours in the peak direction only
Station closed	Station is closed
(Details about time periods)

The Claremont Parkway station, signed as "Claremont Parkway − Between 171st St. & 172nd St." was a local station on the demolished IRT Third Avenue Line in the Bronx, New York City. It originally opened on September 19, 1888, by the Suburban Rapid Transit Company as Wendover Avenue Station, and had three tracks and two side platforms. It was the northern terminus of the Third Avenue elevated until 1891. It was also two blocks east of the former Claremont Park New York Central Railroad station along the Harlem Line that was closed in 1960. The next stop to the north was 174th Street. The next stop to the south was 169th Street. The station closed on April 29, 1973. Claremont Parkway station burned down on April 30, 1973, in a huge arson fire.
