= Claremont Park station (New York Central Railroad) =

Claremont Park
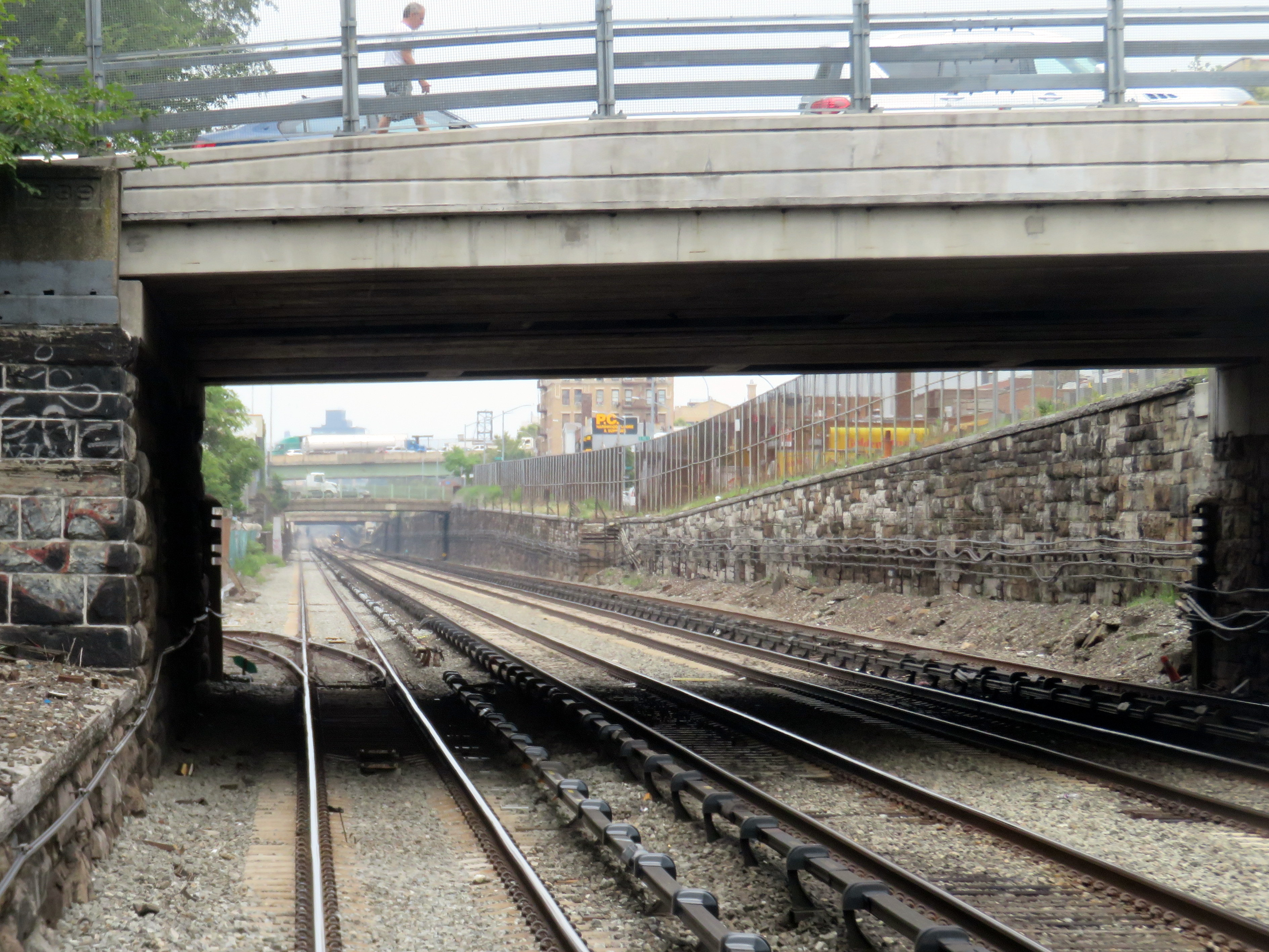
- The former site of Claremont Park station in July 2019

General information
- Location: Park Avenue and Claremont Parkway; Crotona Park East, The Bronx, New York
- Coordinates: 40.8396°N 73.9041°W
- Owner: New York Central Railroad
- Line: Harlem Line
- Platforms: 2 side platforms
- Tracks: 4

History
- Opened: Late-1860s
- Closed: June 1, 1960; 66 years ago
- Rebuilt: 1889 (137 years ago)
- Electrified: 700V (DC) third rail
- Former names: Central Morrisania; Claremont

Former services
Preceding station	New York Central Railroad	Following station
Morrisania toward New York	Harlem Division	Tremont toward Chatham
Location

The Claremont Park station was a station on the New York Central Railroad's Harlem Line in the East Morrisania neighborhood of the Bronx in New York City. The New York, New Haven and Hartford Railroad also ran through this station but did not stop here.

== History ==
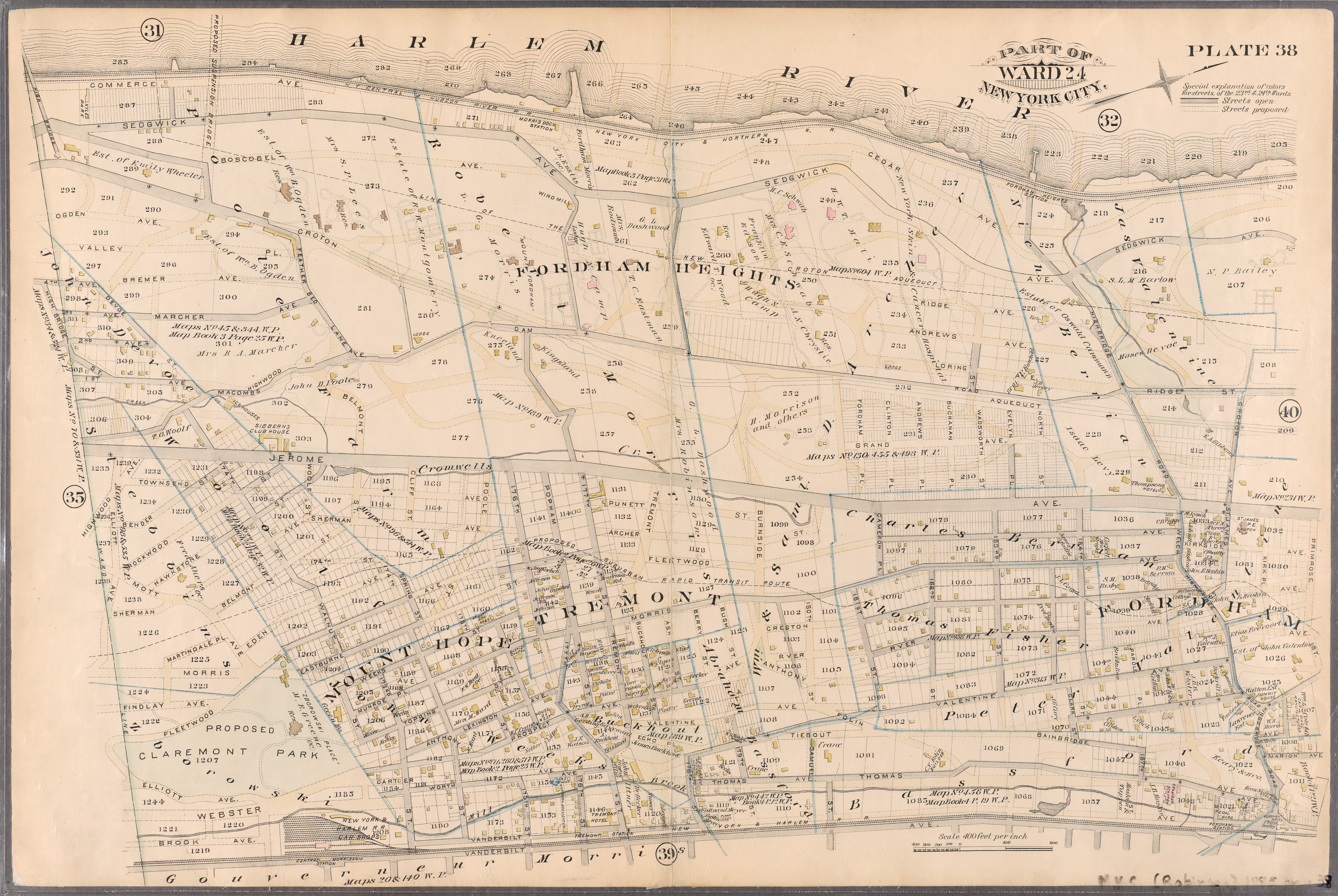
1885 Map showing the old Central Morrisania Station (extreme lower-left of map). Note, west is at the top of the sheet.

Rail service along the New York and Harlem Railroad passed through Morrisania as far back as 1841, and a station was known to exist as far back as 1847, but this wasn't the station. Instead an additional station was built by New York Central and Hudson River Railroad within the vicinity of 172nd Street/Wendover Avenue as far back as the late-1860s. Originally named Central Morrisania station, it was built at surface level along with the rest of the tracks.

Realizing the railroad was causing suburban sprawl within what was then southern Westchester County, the New York City Parks Department acquired the site of the former Claremont Mansion one block to the west in 1888, and converted it into a park.

The station was renamed for that park roughly around the time Claremont Park station was rebuilt by New York Central in April 1891, as part of a grade elimination project within the Bronx. It contained a station house as a bridge on the north side of Claremont Parkway over all four tracks, with two side platforms. Similar structures were built for the former Morrisania Station, as well as the still operating Melrose and Tremont Stations. A small freight yard also used to exist north of the station between the Claremont Parkway and 173rd Street bridges, the remnants of which can still be seen to this day. Three blocks east, the Suburban Rapid Transit Company built the Third Avenue Elevated Line and installed a station along the same street in 1888. No streetcar or bus lines connected the two stations to one another, however.

Declining ridership following World War II, along with the decline of the South Bronx lead to the downfall of various stations within the Bronx, along with competition with the subway, the el, and the automobile. Local politicians also demanded that New York Central take better care of the stations in the Bronx, which they weren't always able to do at the time. On September 14, 1950, the Public Service Commission ended hearings about the New York Central's petition to discontinue service at this station and the 183rd Street station. The Central wanted to close the station to cut travel times on trains to Westchester. The Claremont Park station was closed in 1960. As a result of the closure, commuters were forced to take either the Morrisania station, the Tremont station, or the nearby Claremont Parkway elevated station. Of the three mentioned, only Tremont survives today.
