= 138th Street station (IRT Third Avenue Line) =

New York City Subway station in The Bronx (closed 1955)

138th St.

General information
- Location: East 138th Street between Alexander and Willis Avenues; Mott Haven, The Bronx, New York
- Coordinates: 40°48′32.6″N 73°55′26.7″W
- System: Former Manhattan Railway elevated station
- Operator: Interborough Rapid Transit Company; City of New York (1940–1953); New York City Transit Authority
- Line: Third Avenue Line
- Platforms: 1 island platform
- Tracks: 2

Construction
- Structure type: Elevated

History
- Opened: January 1, 1887; 139 years ago
- Closed: June 11, 1940; 86 years ago (2nd Ave.); May 12, 1955; 71 years ago (3rd Ave.)

Former services
Preceding station	Interborough Rapid Transit	Following station
143rd Street toward Bronx Park	Second Avenue Express	133rd Street toward City Hall
143rd Street toward Bronx Park	Third Avenue Local-Express	133rd Street toward City Hall
Location

The 138th Street station was a station on the demolished IRT Third Avenue Line in the Bronx, New York City. It was originally opened on January 1, 1887, by the Suburban Rapid Transit Company, and had two tracks and one island platform. It was also served by trains of the IRT Second Avenue Line until June 11, 1940. A paid transfer was available to IRT Pelham Line trains at the underground Third Avenue – 138th Street station. This station closed on May 12, 1955, with the ending of all service on the Third Avenue El south of 149th Street.
