= Tremont Avenue–177th Street station =

New York City Subway station in the Bronx (closed 1973)

Tremont Avenue–177th Street
- Former New York City Subway station
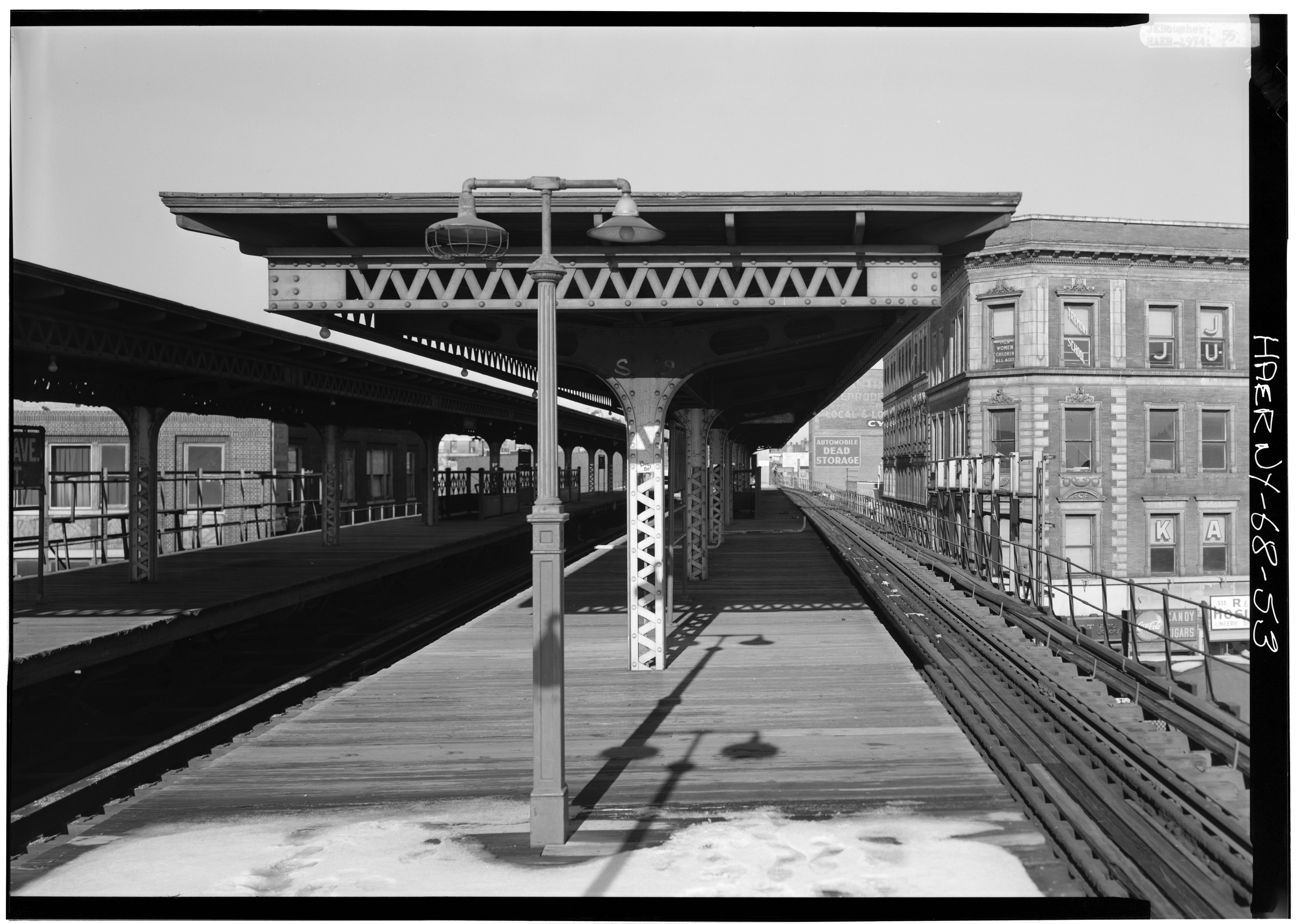
- The platform in the Winter of 1974, nearly a year after the IRT Third Avenue Line was abandoned.

Station statistics
- Address: East Tremont Avenue (formerly East 177th Street) and 3rd Avenue; Bronx, New York 10457
- Borough: The Bronx
- Locale: Tremont
- Coordinates: 40°50′48″N 73°53′46″W
- Division: A (IRT)
- Line: IRT Third Avenue Line
- Services: None
- Platforms: 2 island platforms
- Tracks: 3

Other information
- Opened: July 20, 1891; 135 years ago
- Closed: April 29, 1973; 53 years ago
- Next north: Fordham Road–190th Street (express); 180th Street (local)
- Next south: 174th Street (local); 149th Street (express before 1955)
Location
Location within New York City Subway
Location within New York City
Location within New York
Street map
Station service legend
Symbol	Description
Stops all times	Stops in station at all times
Stops all times except late nights	Stops all times except late nights
Stops late nights only	Stops late nights only
Stops late nights and weekends	Stops late nights and weekends only
Stops weekdays during the day	Stops weekdays during the day
Stops weekends during the day	Stops weekends during the day
Stops all times except rush hours in the peak direction	Stops all times except rush hours in the peak direction
Stops all times except weekdays in the peak direction	Stops all times except weekdays in the peak direction
Stops daily except rush hours in the peak direction	Stops all times except nights and rush hours in the peak direction
Stops rush hours only	Stops rush hours only
Stops rush hours in the peak direction only	Stops rush hours in the peak direction only
Station closed	Station is closed
(Details about time periods)

The Tremont Avenue–177th Street station, at times associated as Bronx Borough Hall, was an express station on the demolished IRT Third Avenue Line in the Bronx, New York City. It was built by the Suburban Rapid Transit Company as 177th Street Station and had three tracks and two island platforms. It opened on July 20, 1891, and was the northern terminus of the Third Avenue elevated line until 1901, when more stations opened as the line was extended north. The next stop to the north was 180th Street for local trains and Fordham Road–190th Street for express trains. The next stop to the south for all trains was 174th Street. In its last years, a reconstructed section rose over the Cross Bronx Expressway at approximately 175th Street as part of the highway's development.

The station closed on April 29, 1973 and was demolished by 1977.

It was notable for being the station that served Bronx Borough Hall (1897–1969).
