= 149th Street station (IRT Third Avenue Line) =

New York City Subway station in the Bronx (closed 1973)

149th Street
- Former New York City Subway station
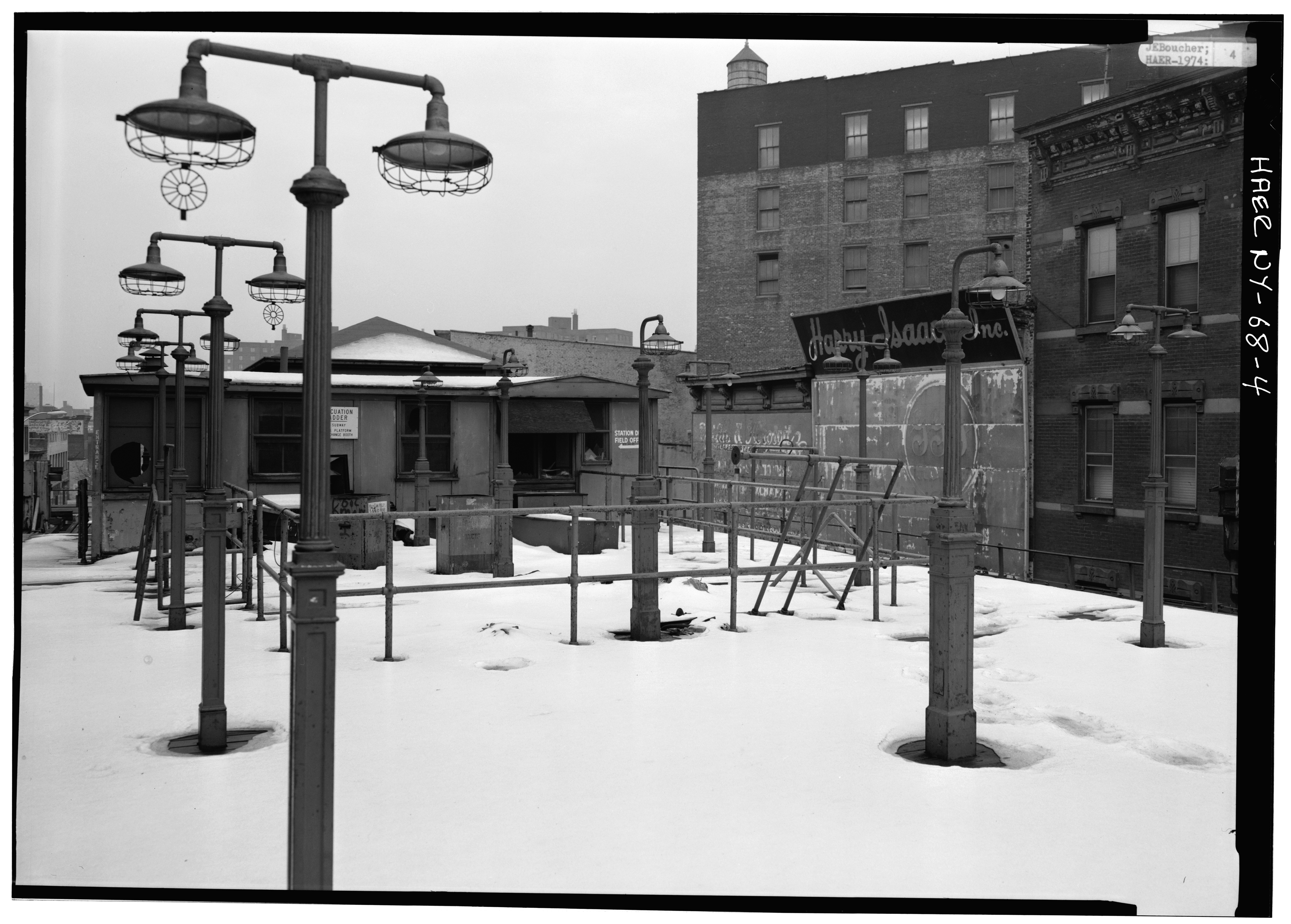
- South end of the station following its closure in 1974

Station statistics
- Address: East 149th Street and 3rd Avenue; Bronx, New York 10455
- Borough: The Bronx
- Locale: The Hub
- Coordinates: 40°48′56.8″N 73°55′05.5″W
- Division: A (IRT)
- Line: IRT Third Avenue Line
- Services: None
- System transfers: IRT White Plains Road Line (at Third Avenue–149th Street)
- Structure: Elevated
- Platforms: 2 island platforms (1887–1955); 1 island platform (1955–1973)
- Tracks: 3 (1887–1955); 2 (1955–1973)

Other information
- Opened: June 16, 1887; 139 years ago
- Closed: April 29, 1973; 53 years ago

Station succession
- Next north: 156th Street
- Next south: Terminus (1955–1973); 143rd Street (1887–1955)
Location
Location within New York City Subway
Location within New York City
Location within New York
Street map
Station service legend
Symbol	Description
Stops all times	Stops in station at all times
Stops all times except late nights	Stops all times except late nights
Stops late nights only	Stops late nights only
Stops late nights and weekends	Stops late nights and weekends only
Stops weekdays during the day	Stops weekdays during the day
Stops weekends during the day	Stops weekends during the day
Stops all times except rush hours in the peak direction	Stops all times except rush hours in the peak direction
Stops all times except weekdays in the peak direction	Stops all times except weekdays in the peak direction
Stops daily except rush hours in the peak direction	Stops all times except nights and rush hours in the peak direction
Stops rush hours only	Stops rush hours only
Stops rush hours in the peak direction only	Stops rush hours in the peak direction only
Station closed	Station is closed
(Details about time periods)

The 149th Street station was a station on the demolished IRT Third Avenue Line in the Bronx, New York City. It was located in "The Hub" in the South Bronx, at the intersection of 149th Street, Third Avenue, Willis Avenue, and Melrose Avenue. Opened as an express station in 1887 and later operating as the line's southern terminus, the station closed in 1973 and was demolished by 1977 due to political pressure in the area.

== Station layout ==
The station was built as an express station, with three tracks and two island platforms; the center express track was completed by 1916. North of the station, a spur track curved from Third Avenue east onto Westchester Avenue (150th Street) to connect with the IRT White Plains Road Line. A signal tower was located in between the mainline and the spur track.

After it became the line's southern terminal in 1955, the center track was removed and the platforms were connected into one large island platform. A diamond crossover switch was installed north of the station to relay terminating trains.

== History ==
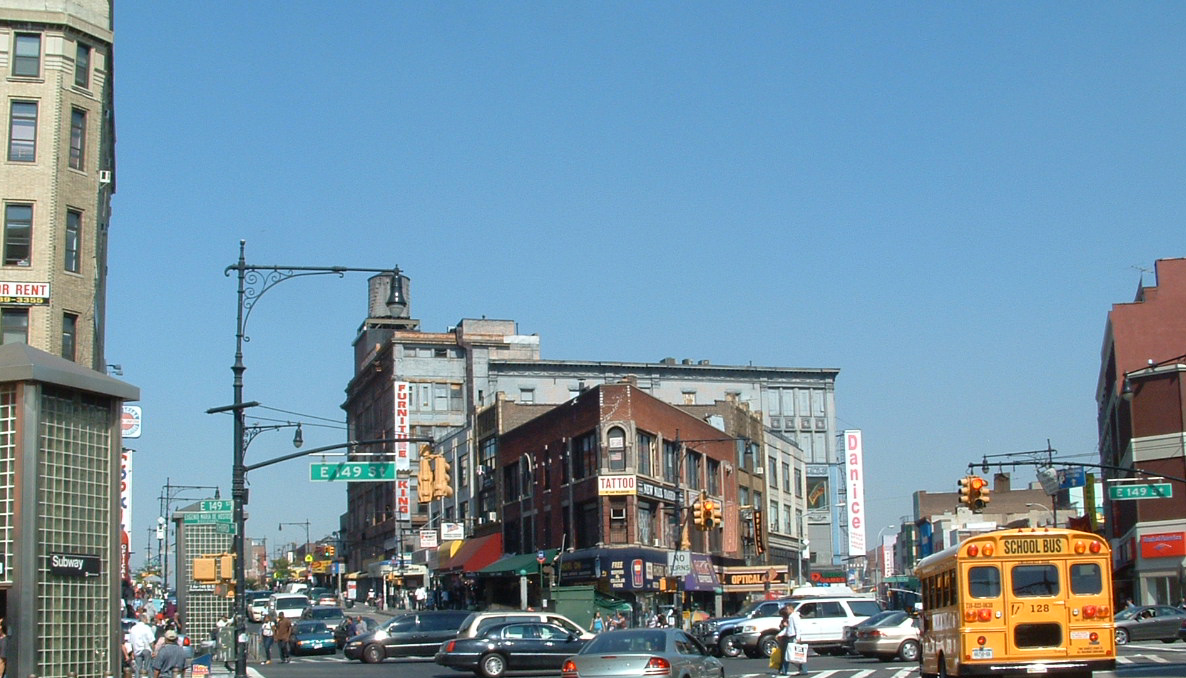
The Hub in Bronx at the north end of the former station, 35 years after it closed.

The station was originally opened on June 16, 1887, by the Suburban Rapid Transit Company. On July 10, 1905, the underground Third Avenue–149th Street station of the IRT White Plains Road Line (which fed into the Lenox Avenue and West Side subways) was opened, and free transfers were provided between the two stations. In October 1911, the 149th Street Crosstown Trolley Line between Longwood and Harlem opened (the predecessor to the current Bx19 bus), in addition to the Third Avenue trolley line of the Third Avenue and Union Railway system. Between 1913 and 1916 during the Dual Contracts, the center track was added to facilitate express service along the line. Around this time, the name "The Hub of the Bronx" emerged due to the area's status as a major transportation, commercial, and amusement center.

In 1921, a seven-car train derailed crossing the spur track north of the station, destroying a control tower and causing a fire on the trestle. Thirty passengers were injured, and the second of the wooden elevated cars was damaged beyond repair.

On May 12, 1955, the Third Avenue elevated was closed south of 149th Street, ending service on the line between the Bronx and Manhattan. 149th Street station became the southern terminus of the Third Avenue Line. In the 1960s under the Program For Action, the city planned to close the remainder of the line, which fell into disrepair and was credited for blight in the area. The station closed on April 29, 1973, and was demolished in 1977.

== Current status ==
From 1973 to 2013, the Bx55 limited bus replaced elevated service between The Hub and Gun Hill Road. Free transfers, first via a paper transfer and later by MetroCard, were given between the bus and the 149th Street subway station. In 2013, the Bx55 was eliminated, replaced by the Bx15 limited bus which terminates at Fordham Plaza. Service to Gun Hill Road is provided by the parallel Bx41 Select Bus Service route along Webster Avenue.
