= 116th Street station (Second Avenue Subway) =

New York City Subway station in Manhattan

116 Street
- Future New York City Subway station
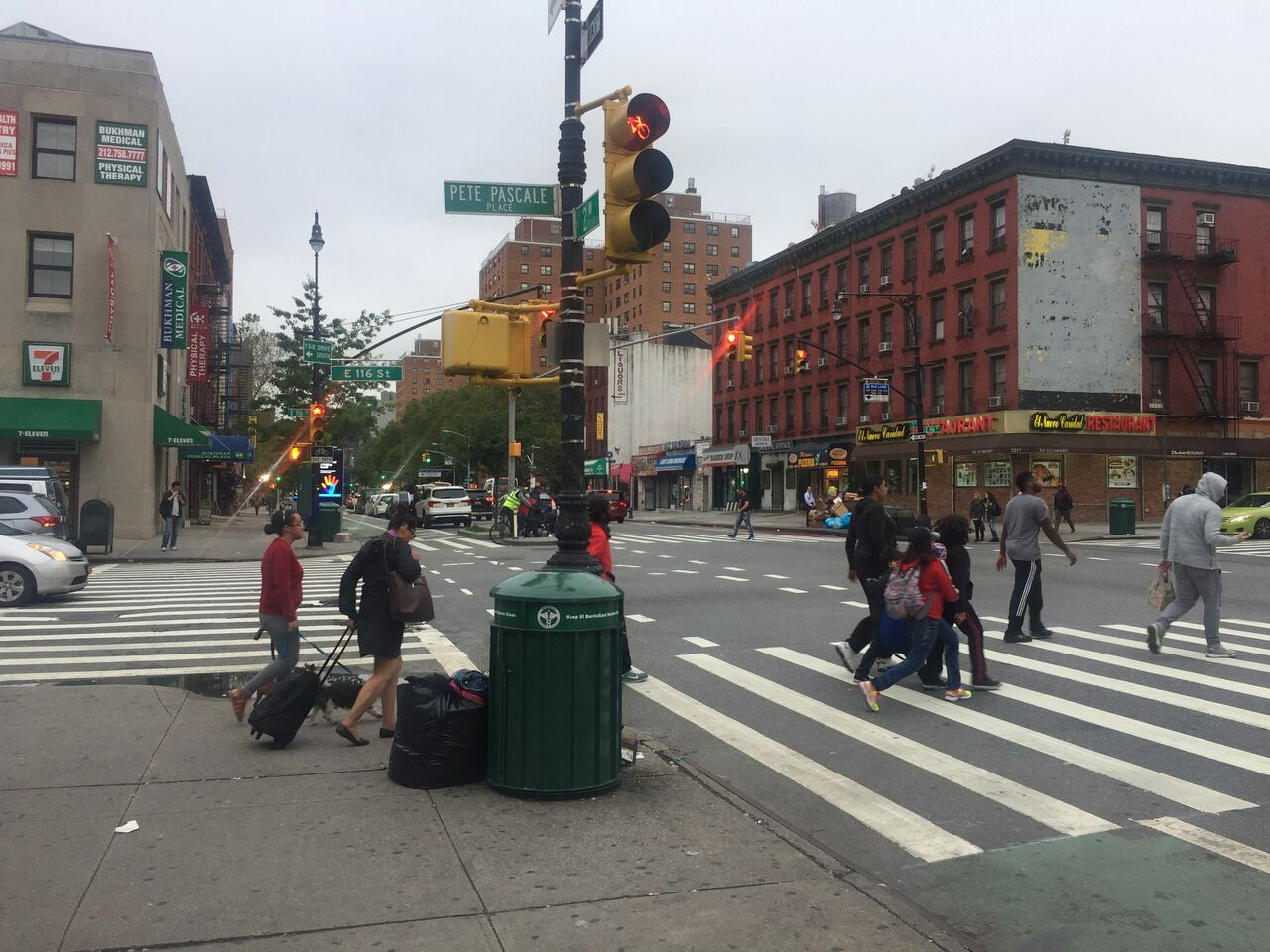
- The corner of Second Avenue and 116th Street, where the future station will be located

Station statistics
- Address: East 116th Street & Second Avenue; New York, NY 10029
- Borough: Manhattan
- Locale: East Harlem
- Coordinates: 40.797°N 73.938°W
- Division: B (IND)
- Line: IND Second Avenue Line
- Services: Future
- Structure: Underground
- Platforms: 1 island platform (planned)
- Tracks: 2 (planned)

Station succession
- Next north: Harlem–125th Street: future
- Next south: 106th Street: future
Location
Location within New York City Subway
Location within New York City
Location within New York
Street map
Station service legend
Symbol	Description
Stops all times	Stops in station at all times
Stops all times except late nights	Stops all times except late nights
Stops late nights only	Stops late nights only
Stops late nights and weekends	Stops late nights and weekends only
Stops weekdays during the day	Stops weekdays during the day
Stops weekends during the day	Stops weekends during the day
Stops all times except rush hours in the peak direction	Stops all times except rush hours in the peak direction
Stops all times except weekdays in the peak direction	Stops all times except weekdays in the peak direction
Stops daily except rush hours in the peak direction	Stops all times except nights and rush hours in the peak direction
Stops rush hours only	Stops rush hours only
Stops rush hours in the peak direction only	Stops rush hours in the peak direction only
Station closed	Station is closed
(Details about time periods)

The 116th Street station is a planned station along the IND Second Avenue Line of the New York City Subway. It would be located at the intersection of Second Avenue and 116th Street in East Harlem, Manhattan. Proposed since 1968, the station is expected to be built as part of Phase 2 of the Second Avenue Subway. When opened, it will initially be served by the Q train, with the T train providing service when Phase 3 of the line is built.

== History ==
=== Background ===
The Second Avenue Line was originally proposed in 1919 as part of a massive expansion of what would become the Independent Subway System (IND). Work on the line never commenced, as the Great Depression crushed the economy. Numerous plans for the Second Avenue Subway appeared throughout the 20th century, but these were usually deferred due to lack of funds. In anticipation of the never-built new subway line, the Second and Third Avenue elevated lines were demolished in 1942 and 1955, respectively. The Second Avenue Elevated had a station at 117th Street, and the Third Avenue Elevated had a stop on nearby Third Avenue at 116th Street.

=== Unrealized proposals ===
The Metropolitan Transportation Authority (MTA) proposed a full-length Second Avenue Subway as part of its 1968 Program for Action. The line was to be built in two phases—the first phase from 126th to 34th Streets, the second phase from 34th to Whitehall Streets. The line's planned stops in Manhattan, spaced farther apart than those on existing subway lines, proved controversial; the Second Avenue line was criticized as a "rich man's express, circumventing the Lower East Side with its complexes of high-rise low- and middle-income housing and slums in favor of a silk stocking route." There was to be no station at 116th Street, but the next station north would be at 125th Street and the next station south would be at 106th Street.

A combination of Federal and State funding was obtained, and despite the controversy over the number of stops and route, a groundbreaking ceremony was held on October 27, 1972, at Second Avenue and 103rd Street. In December 1972, the New York City Transit Authority started soliciting bids for the construction of Section 13 of Route 132-A, which was between 110th and 120th Streets in East Harlem. Bids opened on January 26, 1973, and the bid from Cayuga-Crimmins was the lowest of six bids. The contract was awarded on March 20, 1973, and, in that month, construction of the segment by Cayuga-Crimmins began at a cost of $35.45 million (equivalent to $272,855,000 in 2025). About half of this section was constructed through solid rock and therefore continual blasting was necessary. One worker was killed in the construction of this section.

However, the city soon experienced its most dire fiscal crisis yet, due to the stagnant economy of the early 1970s, combined with the massive outflow of city residents to the suburbs, and in September 1975 construction on the line stopped, and the tunnels were sealed. Over the next few decades, the MTA regularly inspected and maintained the tunnel segments (spending $20,000 a year by the early 1990s), to maintain the structural integrity of the streets above, and in case construction would ever resume. Trespassers would often camp in the tunnels until the MTA increased security. The tunnel section from 110th to 120th Streets was built with three tracks, and as part of the 1970s construction plan, under which this segment was constructed, there was no station planned at 116th Street.

In 1999, the Regional Plan Association recommended building a full-length Second Avenue Subway, which would include 116th Street as one of its planned 31 stations. The station would serve central and southern East Harlem.

== 21st century construction ==
=== Introduction of the station to plans ===
In March 2007, plans for the construction of the Second Avenue Subway were revived. The line's first phase, the "first major expansion" to the New York City Subway in more than a half-century, included three stations in total and cost $4.45 to $4.5 billion, spanning from 105th Street and Second Avenue to 63rd Street and Third Avenue. Phase 1 opened on January 1, 2017, with the line's northern terminal at 96th Street.

The second phase, between 125th and 96th Streets, was allocated $525 million in the MTA's 2015–2019 Capital Plan for planning, design, environmental studies, and utility relocation. This phase will complete the project's East Harlem section. The alignment will run under Second Avenue to 124th Street, before turning west on 125th Street. On October 18, 2016, the de Blasio administration announced a rezoning plan for East Harlem. One of the three Special Transit Land Use (TA) districts is for the area of the 116th Street station.

On November 21, 2016, the MTA requested that the Phase 2 project be entered into the Project Development phase under the Federal Transit Administration's New Starts program. On December 15, several elected officials for the area announced that they were seeking $6 billion of funding for Phase 2 of the line, including $2 billion from the federal government. These officials wished to secure funding from the presidential administration of Barack Obama before Obama's term ended on January 20, 2017. In their request for funding, they cited that they wanted to avoid an uncertain response from the first administration of Donald Trump and start construction on Phase 2 as soon as possible. The FTA granted this request in late December 2016. Under the approved plan, the MTA would complete an environmental reevaluation by 2018, receive funding by 2020, and open Phase 2 between 2027 and 2029. In January 2017, it was announced that Phases 2 and 3, which are expected to cost up to a combined $14.2 billion, were on the Trump administration's priority list of 50 most important transportation projects nationwide.

In July 2018, the MTA released a supplemental environmental assessment for Phase 2 of the Second Avenue Subway. The updated report indicated that the 116th Street station would be relocated about 30 feet (9.1 m) north compared to what had been proposed in the 2004 FEIS, eliminating a curve at the south end of the platform. Because the station is located below the surface, there would be less space to build utility rooms underground compared to deep-level Phase 1 stations, and so the ancillary facilities would be larger than in the Phase 1 stations. Both ancillaries had to be relocated, since the locations outlined in the 2004 FEIS were no longer feasible for demolition. The entrances were also enlarged for easier access from Second Avenue, and an entrance at 118th Street and Second Avenue was relocated from the southeast corner to the northeast. Under the new plan, the station would also include extra elevators in compliance with the Americans with Disabilities Act of 1990. Whereas Phase 1 stations only included elevators at one entrance, the 106th and 116th Street stations would both include elevators at two entrances.

=== Current plans ===
The original 1970s plans for the Second Avenue Line did not include a station at 116th Street; as part of the original construction, there were three tracks built in this segment, with the middle track intended to be used for repairing and inspecting trains. A station at 116th Street was added due to requests from the community during Phase 1's planning in the early 2000s. Because of this, the existing tunnel segment from 110th Street to 120th Street was initially proposed to be partially demolished to make room for the 116th Street station. The platform will be 25 feet 3 inches (7.70 m) wide, the width of the station will be 59 feet (18 m). However, by April 2019, it was decided to simply build a platform over the center trackway, instead of totally rebuilding the structure, to save a considerable amount of money. There will be a mezzanine built at the station with ancillary space on either side, and the height between the platform and the ceiling will be 16 feet 8 inches (5.08 m). It is not yet clear where an elevator will be.

Track maps on the MTA's website show that the station will have two tracks and one island platform. The station would extend approximately 41 feet (12 m) deep from street level to trackbed. Under current plans, there are to be two exits. One exit would be at the northeast corner of 116th Street and Second Avenue; the other would be at the northeast corner of 118th Street and Second Avenue. Under the original plan, one ancillary would be present on the east side of Second Avenue near 115th Street and one will be on the west side near 119th Street, while a third ancillary would be located over the entrance at 116th Street. As of July 2018, the ancillary near the southeast corner of 116th Street was relocated to the northeast corner of 115th Street, while the ancillary at the northeast corner of 118th Street was relocated to the west side of Second Avenue between 119th and 120th Streets. The ancillary over the entrance at the northeast corner of 116th Street was eliminated, and the entrances were enlarged.

In April 2023, it was reported that the MTA had filed paperwork indicating plans to use eminent domain in order to acquire certain properties along the route. The MTA subsequently filed a request in June 2025 to obtain 10 properties near the 116th Street station through eminent domain. In August 2025, the MTA board awarded a $1.97 billion contract to Connect Plus Partners, a joint venture between Halmar International and FCC Construction. The contract includes the construction of the 125th Street station shell, reconstruction of the existing tunnel near the 116th Street station, and new tunnels between Second Avenue–120th Street and Lenox Avenue–125th Street.
