= 106th Street station =

106th Street station may refer to:

- 106th Street (IRT Third Avenue Line), an express station on the demolished IRT Third Avenue Line
- 106th Street (Second Avenue Subway), a station on the proposed expansion of the Second Avenue Subway
