= 117th Street station =

Former Manhattan Railway elevated station (closed 1940)

117th St.

General information
- Location: East 117th Street and 2nd Avenue; East Harlem, Manhattan, New York
- Coordinates: 40°47′51.64″N 73°56′14.23″W
- System: Former Manhattan Railway elevated station
- Operator: Interborough Rapid Transit Company
- Line: Second Avenue Line
- Platforms: 2 side platforms
- Tracks: 2

Construction
- Structure type: Elevated

History
- Opened: March 1, 1880; 146 years ago
- Closed: June 11, 1940; 86 years ago

Former services
| Preceding station | Interborough Rapid Transit | Following station |
|---|---|---|
| 121st Street toward 129th Street | Second Avenue Local | 111th Street toward South Ferry |
Location

The 117th Street station was a local station on the demolished IRT Second Avenue Line in Manhattan, New York City. It had three tracks and two side platforms. The next stop to the north was 121st Street. The next stop to the south was 111th Street. The station closed on June 11, 1940. The station closed on June 11, 1940. A station under construction for the new Second Avenue Subway extension to 125th Street station on the IRT Lexington Avenue Line will replace the former elevated station with a new 116th Street station.
