= 105th Street station =

Former Manhattan Railway elevated station (closed 1940)

105th St.

General information
- Location: East 105th Street and 2nd Avenue; East Harlem, Manhattan, New York
- Coordinates: 40°47′23.8″N 73°56′34.52″W
- System: Former Manhattan Railway elevated station
- Operator: Interborough Rapid Transit Company
- Line: Second Avenue Line
- Platforms: 2 side platforms
- Tracks: 3

Construction
- Structure type: Elevated

History
- Opened: March 1, 1880; 146 years ago
- Closed: June 11, 1940; 86 years ago

Former services
Preceding station	Interborough Rapid Transit	Following station
111th Street toward 129th Street	Second Avenue Local	99th Street toward South Ferry
Location

The 105th Street station was a local station on the demolished IRT Second Avenue Line in Manhattan, New York City. It had three tracks and two side platforms. The next stop to the north was 111th Street. The next stop to the south was 99th Street. The station closed on June 11, 1940. A station under construction for the Second Avenue Subway extension to 125th Street station on the IRT Lexington Avenue Line will replace the former elevated station with the new 106th Street station.
