= 121st Street station (IRT Second Avenue Line) =

Former Manhattan Railway elevated station (closed 1940)

121st St.

General information
- Location: East 121st Street and 2nd Avenue; East Harlem, Manhattan, New York
- Coordinates: 40°48′0.65″N 73°56′7.53″W
- System: Former Manhattan Railway elevated station
- Operator: Interborough Rapid Transit Company
- Line: Second Avenue Line
- Platforms: 2 side platforms
- Tracks: 3

Construction
- Structure type: Elevated

History
- Opened: March 1, 1880; 146 years ago
- Closed: June 11, 1940; 86 years ago

Former services
| Preceding station | Interborough Rapid Transit | Following station |
|---|---|---|
| 125th Street toward 129th Street | Second Avenue Local | 117th Street toward South Ferry |
Location

The 121st Street station was a local station on the demolished IRT Second Avenue Line in Manhattan, New York City. It had three tracks and two side platforms. The next stop to the north was 125th Street. The next stop to the south was 117th Street. The station closed on June 11, 1940.
