= 50th Street station =

50th Street Station may refer to:

- New York City Subway stations:
  - 50th Street (IND Eighth Avenue Line), in Manhattan, served by the A, C, and E trains
  - 50th Street (IRT Broadway – Seventh Avenue Line) in Manhattan, served by the 1 and 2 trains
  - 47th–50th Streets – Rockefeller Center (IND Sixth Avenue Line) in Manhattan, served by the B, D, F, <F>, and M trains
  - 50th Street (IRT Sixth Avenue Line), a demolished station in Manhattan
  - 50th Street (IRT Second Avenue Line), a demolished station in Manhattan
  - 50th Street (IRT Ninth Avenue Line), a demolished station in Manhattan
  - 50th Street (BMT West End Line) in Brooklyn, served by the D train
  - Bay 50th Street (BMT West End Line) in Brooklyn, served by the D train
- 50th Street/Minnehaha Park station in Minneapolis
- 50th Street/Washington station in Phoenix
