= 42nd Street station (IRT Second Avenue Line) =

Former Manhattan Railway elevated station (closed 1942)

42ND. ST.

General information
- Location: East 42nd Street and 2nd Avenue; Midtown Manhattan, Manhattan, New York
- Coordinates: 40°44′59.33″N 73°58′19.91″W
- System: Former Manhattan Railway elevated station
- Operator: Interborough Rapid Transit Company; City of New York (after 1940)
- Line: Second Avenue Line
- Platforms: 2 island platforms
- Tracks: 3

Construction
- Structure type: Elevated

History
- Opened: March 1, 1880; 146 years ago
- Closed: June 13, 1942; 84 years ago

Former services
Preceding station	Interborough Rapid Transit	Following station
57th Street toward Bronx Park	Second Avenue Express	14th Street toward City Hall
57th Street toward Ditmars Boulevard	Second Avenue Queens	14th Street toward City Hall
50th Street toward 129th Street	Second Avenue Local	34th Street toward South Ferry
Location

The 42nd Street station was an express station on the demolished IRT Second Avenue Line in Manhattan, New York City. It had three tracks and two island platforms. The next stop to the north was 50th Street for local trains and 57th Street for express trains. The next stop to the south was 34th Street for local trains and 14th Street for express trains. The station closed on June 13, 1942.
