= 125th Street station (IRT Second Avenue Line) =

Former Manhattan Railway elevated station (closed 1940)

125th St.

General information
- Location: East 125th Street and 2nd Avenue; East Harlem, Manhattan, New York
- Coordinates: 40.802761°N 73.933587°W
- System: Former Manhattan Railway elevated station
- Operator: Interborough Rapid Transit Company
- Line: Second Avenue Line
- Platforms: 2 island platforms
- Tracks: 3

Construction
- Structure type: Elevated

History
- Opened: March 1, 1880; 146 years ago
- Closed: June 11, 1940; 86 years ago

Former services
Preceding station	Interborough Rapid Transit	Following station
133rd Street toward Bronx Park	Second Avenue Express	86th Street toward City Hall
129th Street Terminus	Second Avenue Local	121st Street toward South Ferry
Location

The 125th Street station was an express station on the demolished IRT Second Avenue Line in Manhattan, New York City. It had three tracks and two island platforms. The next stop to the north was 129th Street for terminating trains and 133rd Street for through trains. The next stop to the south was 121st Street for local trains and 86th Street for express trains. The station closed on June 11, 1940.

The Metropolitan Transportation Authority is building an extension of the replacement Second Avenue Subway to the 125th Street station on the IRT Lexington Avenue Line, which would involve the construction of a new underground subway platform.
