= 125th Street station (IRT Third Avenue Line) =

Former Manhattan Railway elevated station (closed 1955)

125th St.

General information
- Location: East 125th Street and 3rd Avenue; Upper Manhattan, Manhattan, New York
- Coordinates: 40°48′13″N 73°56′09″W
- System: Former Manhattan Railway elevated station
- Operator: Interborough Rapid Transit Company; City of New York (1940–1953); New York City Transit Authority
- Line: Third Avenue Line
- Platforms: 4 side platforms (2 on each level)
- Tracks: 3 (1 – upper level) (2 – lower level)

Construction
- Structure type: Elevated

History
- Opened: December 30, 1878; 147 years ago
- Closed: May 12, 1955; 71 years ago

Former services
Preceding station	Interborough Rapid Transit	Following station
129th Street toward Bronx Park	Third Avenue Local-Express	106th Street toward City Hall
129th Street Terminus	Third Avenue Local	116th Street toward South Ferry
Location

The 125th Street station was an express station on the demolished IRT Third Avenue Line in Manhattan, New York City as part of the extension of the Third Avenue Line north of 67th Street. It opened on December 30, 1878, and had three tracks and two levels. The lower level was built first and had two tracks and two side platforms for local trains. The upper level, built as part of the Dual Contracts, had one track and two side platforms for express trains. Simultaneously during the dual contracts period, IRT also expanded the Lexington Avenue Subway which included a station one block west of the el station. This station closed on May 12, 1955, with the ending of all service on the Third Avenue El south of 149th Street.
