= First Street station (IRT Second Avenue Line) =

Former Manhattan Railway elevated station (closed 1942)

First St.

General information
- Location: East 1st Street and 1st Avenue; East Village, Manhattan, New York
- Coordinates: 40°43′23.69″N 73°59′18.54″W
- System: Former Manhattan Railway elevated station
- Operator: Interborough Rapid Transit Company; City of New York (after 1940)
- Line: Second Avenue Line
- Platforms: 2 side platforms
- Tracks: 3 (2 – lower level) (1 – upper level)

Construction
- Structure type: Elevated

History
- Opened: March 1, 1880; 146 years ago
- Closed: June 13, 1942; 84 years ago

Former services
Preceding station	Interborough Rapid Transit	Following station
Eighth Street toward 129th Street	Second Avenue Local	Rivington Street toward South Ferry
Location

The First Street station was a local station on the demolished IRT Second Avenue Line in Manhattan, New York City, located at the intersection of First Street and First Avenue. It had two levels. The lower level had two tracks and two side platforms and the upper level had one track that served express trains. The station opened on March 1, 1880, and closed on June 13, 1942.
