= Rivington Street station =

Former Manhattan Railway elevated station (closed 1942)

Rivington St.

General information
- Location: Rivington Street and Allen Street; Lower East Side, Manhattan, New York
- Coordinates: 40°43′13.81″N 73°59′23.52″W
- System: Former Manhattan Railway elevated station
- Operator: Interborough Rapid Transit Company; City of New York (after 1940)
- Line: Second Avenue Line
- Platforms: 2 side platforms
- Tracks: 3 (2 – lower level) (1 – upper level)

Construction
- Structure type: Elevated

History
- Opened: March 1, 1880; 146 years ago
- Closed: June 13, 1942; 84 years ago

Former services
Preceding station	Interborough Rapid Transit	Following station
First Street toward 129th Street	Second Avenue Local	Grand Street toward South Ferry
Location

The Rivington Street station was a local station on the demolished IRT Second Avenue Line in Manhattan, New York City. It had two levels. The lower level had two tracks and two side platforms while the upper level had one track that served the express trains. The next stop to the north was First Street. The next stop to the south was Grand Street. The station closed on June 13, 1942.
