= 99th Street station (IRT Second Avenue Line) =

Former Manhattan Railway elevated station (closed 1940)

99th St.

General information
- Location: East 99th Street and 2nd Avenue; East Harlem, Manhattan, New York
- Coordinates: 40°47′10.1″N 73°56′44.18″W
- System: Former Manhattan Railway elevated station
- Operator: Interborough Rapid Transit Company
- Line: Second Avenue Line
- Platforms: 2 side platforms
- Tracks: 3

Construction
- Structure type: Elevated

History
- Opened: March 1, 1880; 146 years ago
- Closed: June 11, 1940; 86 years ago

Former services
Preceding station	Interborough Rapid Transit	Following station
105th Street toward 129th Street	Second Avenue Local	92nd Street toward South Ferry
Location

The 99th Street station was a local station on the demolished IRT Second Avenue Line in Manhattan, New York City. It had three tracks and two side platforms. The next stop to the north was 105th Street. The next stop to the south was 92nd Street. The station closed on June 11, 1940. Three blocks to the south mass transit service was replaced by the 96th Street station of the Second Avenue Subway.
