= 72nd Street station (IRT Second Avenue Line) =

Former Manhattan Railway elevated station (closed 1940)

72nd St.

General information
- Location: East 72nd Street and 2nd Avenue; Lenox Hill, Manhattan, New York
- Coordinates: 40°46′7.7″N 73°57′30.28″W
- System: Former Manhattan Railway elevated station
- Operator: Interborough Rapid Transit Company
- Line: Second Avenue Line
- Platforms: 2 side platforms
- Tracks: 3

Construction
- Structure type: Elevated

History
- Opened: March 1, 1880; 146 years ago
- Closed: June 11, 1940; 86 years ago

Former services
Preceding station	Interborough Rapid Transit	Following station
80th Street toward 129th Street	Second Avenue Local	65th Street toward South Ferry
Location

The 72nd Street station was a local station on the demolished IRT Second Avenue Line in Manhattan, New York City. It had three tracks and two side platforms. The next stop to the north was 80th Street. The next stop to the south was 65th Street. The station closed on June 11, 1940. The site is now served by the 72nd Street station of the Second Avenue Subway.
