= 92nd Street station =

Former Manhattan Railway elevated station (closed 1940)

92nd St.

General information
- Location: East 92nd Street and 2nd Avenue; Yorkville, Manhattan, New York
- Coordinates: 40°46′54.1″N 73°56′56.33″W
- System: Former Manhattan Railway elevated station
- Operator: Interborough Rapid Transit Company
- Line: Second Avenue Line
- Platforms: 2 side platforms
- Tracks: 3

Construction
- Structure type: Elevated

History
- Opened: March 1, 1880; 146 years ago
- Closed: June 11, 1940; 86 years ago

Former services
Preceding station	Interborough Rapid Transit	Following station
99th Street toward 129th Street	Second Avenue Local	86th Street toward South Ferry
Location

The 92nd Street station was a local station on the demolished IRT Second Avenue Line in Manhattan, New York City. It had three tracks and two side platforms. The next stop to the north was 99th Street. The next stop to the south was 86th Street. The station closed on June 11, 1940. Four blocks to the north mass transit service was replaced by the 96th Street station of the Second Avenue Subway.
