= 111th Street =

111th Street may refer to:

== Streets ==
- 111 Street, Edmonton, Alberta, Canada

== Stations ==
=== Chicago ===
- 111th station, a planned Chicago "L" station
- 111th Street/Morgan Park station, serving the Metra Rock Island District Beverly branch
- 111th Street/Pullman station, serving the Metra Electric District

=== New York City ===
- 111th Street station (IRT Flushing Line); serving the 7 train
- 111th Street station (BMT Jamaica Line); serving the J train
- 111th Street station (IND Fulton Street Line); serving the A train
- 111th Street station (IRT Second Avenue Line); demolished
