= 106th Street station (Second Avenue Subway) =

New York City Subway station in Manhattan

106 Street
- Future New York City Subway station
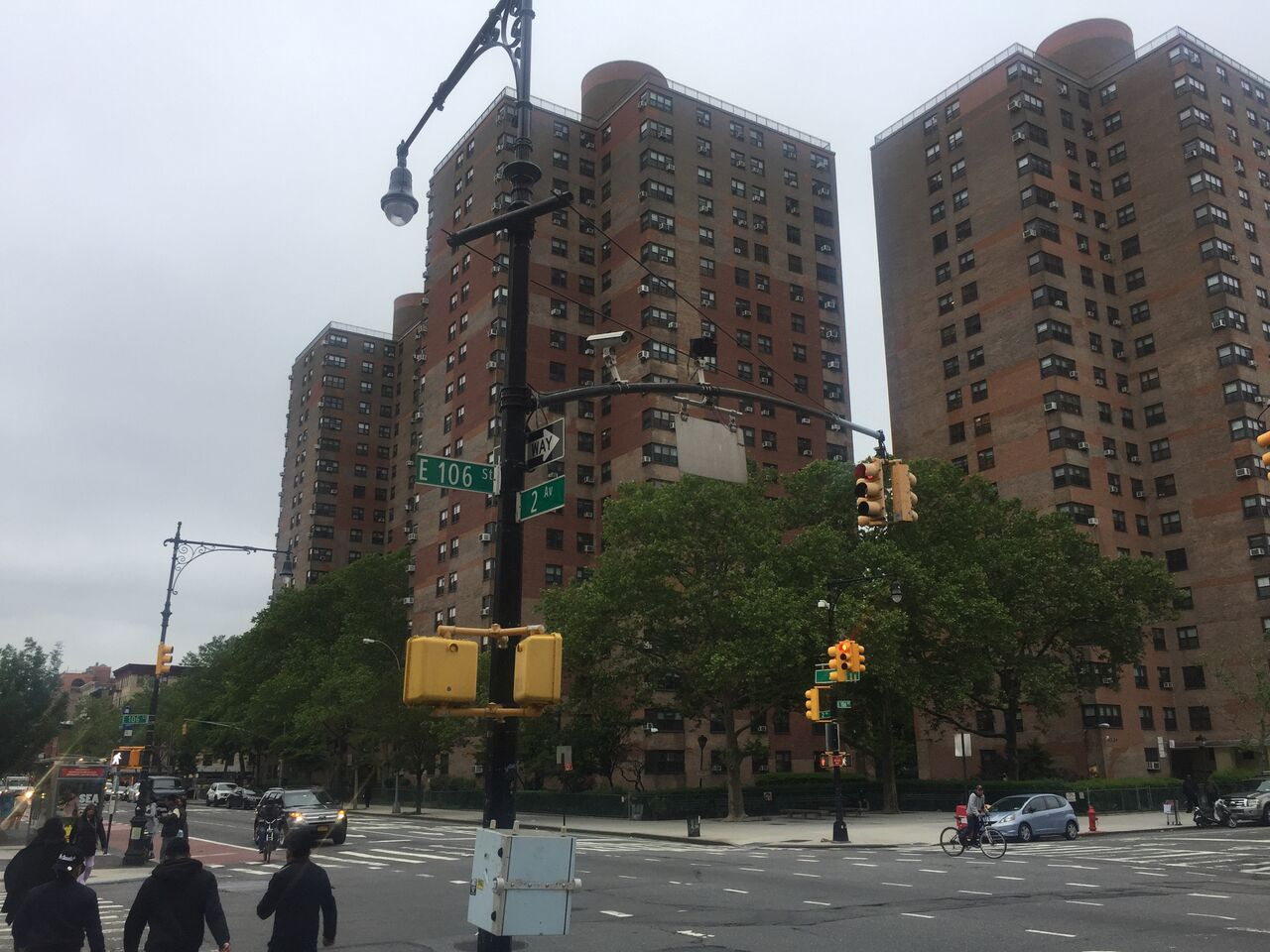
- Planned station site

Station statistics
- Address: East 106th Street & Second Avenue; New York, NY 10029
- Borough: Manhattan
- Locale: East Harlem
- Coordinates: 40.7906°N 73.9425°W
- Division: B (IND)
- Line: IND Second Avenue Line
- Services: Future
- Structure: Underground
- Platforms: 1 island platform (planned)
- Tracks: 2 (planned)

Station succession
- Next north: 116th Street: future
- Next south: 96th Street: future
Location
Location within New York City Subway
Location within New York City
Location within New York
Street map
Station service legend
Symbol	Description
Stops all times	Stops in station at all times
Stops all times except late nights	Stops all times except late nights
Stops late nights only	Stops late nights only
Stops late nights and weekends	Stops late nights and weekends only
Stops weekdays during the day	Stops weekdays during the day
Stops weekends during the day	Stops weekends during the day
Stops all times except rush hours in the peak direction	Stops all times except rush hours in the peak direction
Stops all times except weekdays in the peak direction	Stops all times except weekdays in the peak direction
Stops daily except rush hours in the peak direction	Stops all times except nights and rush hours in the peak direction
Stops rush hours only	Stops rush hours only
Stops rush hours in the peak direction only	Stops rush hours in the peak direction only
Station closed	Station is closed
(Details about time periods)

The 106th Street station is a planned station along the IND Second Avenue Line of the New York City Subway. It would be located at the intersection of Second Avenue and 106th Street in East Harlem, Manhattan, United States. Proposed since 1968, the station is expected to be built as part of Phase 2 of the Second Avenue Subway. When opened, it will initially be served by the Q train, with the T train providing service when Phase 3 of the line is built.

== History ==
=== Background ===
The Second Avenue Line was originally proposed in 1919 as part of a massive expansion of what would become the Independent Subway System (IND). Work on the line never commenced, as the Great Depression crushed the economy. Numerous plans for the Second Avenue Subway appeared throughout the 20th century, but these were usually deferred due to lack of funds. In anticipation of the never-built new subway line, the Second and Third Avenue elevated lines were demolished in 1942 and 1955, respectively. The Second Avenue Elevated had a station at 105th Street, and the Third Avenue Elevated had a stop on nearby Third Avenue at 106th Street.

=== Unrealized proposals ===
The Metropolitan Transportation Authority proposed a full-length Second Avenue Subway as part of its 1968 Program for Action. The line was to be built in two phases—the first phase from 126th to 34th Streets, the second phase from 34th to Whitehall Streets. The line's planned stops in Manhattan, spaced farther apart than those on existing subway lines, proved controversial; the Second Avenue line was criticized as a "rich man's express, circumventing the Lower East Side with its complexes of high-rise low- and middle-income housing and slums in favor of a silk stocking route." There was to be a station at 106th Street, but the next station north would be at 125th Street and the next station south would be at 86th Street. In a planning report, a possible 106th Street station had already been confirmed.

All Second Avenue Subway stations built under the Program for Action would have included escalators, high intensity lighting, improved audio systems, platform edge strips, and non-slip floors to accommodate the needs of the elderly and people with disabilities, but no elevators. Space at each station would have been used for ancillary facilities. The stations were to be made with brick walls and pavers alongside stainless steel, and would have relatively small dimensions, with 10-foot (3.0 m) mezzanine ceilings. Johnson & Hanchard received a contract for the design of the 106th Street station.

A combination of Federal and State funding was obtained, and despite the controversy over the number of stops and route, a groundbreaking ceremony was held on October 27, 1972, at Second Avenue and 103rd Street. Construction began shortly thereafter on what was to be the 99th–105th Streets segment, which was projected to cost $17.48 million (worth about $134,542,000 today). However, the city soon experienced its most dire fiscal crisis yet, due to the stagnant economy of the early 1970s, combined with the massive outflow of city residents to the suburbs, and in September 1975, construction on the line stopped, and the tunnels were sealed. Over the next few decades, the MTA regularly inspected and maintained the tunnel segments (spending $20,000 a year by the early 1990s), to maintain the structural integrity of the streets above, and in case construction would ever resume. Trespassers would often camp in the tunnels until the MTA increased security.

In 1999, the Regional Plan Association recommended building a full-length Second Avenue Subway, which would include 106th Street as one of its planned 31 stations. The station would serve southern East Harlem.

== Current construction ==
In March 2007, plans for the construction of the Second Avenue Subway were revived. The line's first phase, the "first major expansion" to the New York City Subway in more than a half-century, included three stations in total and cost $4.45 to $4.5 billion, spanning from 105th Street and Second Avenue to 63rd Street and Third Avenue. Phase 1 opened on January 1, 2017, with the line's northern terminal at 96th Street.

The second phase, between 125th and 96th Streets, was allocated $525 million in the MTA's 2015–2019 Capital Plan for planning, design, environmental studies, and utility relocation. This phase will complete the project's East Harlem section. The alignment will run under Second Avenue to 124th Street, before turning west on 125th Street. On October 18, 2016, the de Blasio administration announced a rezoning plan for East Harlem. One of the three Special Transit Land Use (TA) districts is for the area of the 106th Street station.

On November 21, 2016, the MTA requested that the Phase 2 project be entered into the Project Development phase under the Federal Transit Administration's New Starts program. On December 15, several elected officials for the area announced that they were seeking $6 billion of funding for Phase 2 of the line, including $2 billion from the federal government. These officials wished to secure funding from the presidential administration of Barack Obama before Obama's term ended on January 20, 2017. In their request for funding, they cited that they wanted to avoid an uncertain response from the first administration of Donald Trump and start construction on Phase 2 as soon as possible. The FTA granted this request in late December 2016. Under the approved plan, the MTA would complete an environmental reevaluation by 2018, receive funding by 2020, and open Phase 2 between 2027 and 2029. In January 2017, it was announced that Phases 2 and 3, which are expected to cost up to a combined $14.2 billion, were on the Trump administration's priority list of 50 most important transportation projects nationwide.

In July 2018, the MTA released a supplemental environmental assessment for Phase 2 of the Second Avenue Subway. The updated report indicated that the 106th Street station would be relocated about 5 to 6 feet (1.5 to 1.8 m) east and 50 feet (15 m) south compared to what had been proposed in the 2004 FEIS, in order to circumvent existing infrastructure under Second Avenue. Because the station is located below the surface, there would be less space to build utility rooms underground compared to deep-level Phase 1 stations, and so the ancillary facilities would be larger than in the Phase 1 stations. Both ancillaries had to be relocated, since the locations outlined in the 2004 FEIS were no longer feasible for demolition. The entrances were also enlarged for easier access from Second Avenue, and an entrance at 108th Street and Second Avenue was relocated from the southeast corner to the northeast. Under the new plan, the station would also include extra elevators in compliance with the Americans with Disabilities Act of 1990. Whereas Phase 1 stations only included elevators at one entrance, the 106th and 116th Street stations would both include elevators at two entrances.

Land acquisition for Phase 2 started in April 2022, and in 2025, the MTA began soliciting bids for the design and construction of Phase 2. Following a months-long delay caused by the federal government withholding funds for Phase 2, in June 2026, Skanska, Traylor and Walsh received a $1.02 billion contract for the 106th Street station's excavation. The contract, the third of four large contracts to be awarded for Phase 2, includes the 106th Street station shell, along with connections to the existing tunnels north and south of the station.

=== Current plans ===
Track maps on the MTA's website show that 106th Street will have two tracks and one island platform. The station would be approximately 52 feet (16 m) deep. Under current plans, there are to be two exits. One exit would be at the northeast corner of 106th Street and Second Avenue; the other would be at the northeast corner of 108th Street and Second Avenue. Under the original plan, two ancillaries would have been present on Second Avenue at the northeast corners of 105th and 108th Streets. As of July 2018, the ancillary at 105th Street was relocated to the southeast corner of 106th Street, while the ancillary at the northeast corner of 108th Street was relocated to the northwest corner of 109th Street.
