= 80th Street station (IRT Second Avenue Line) =

Former Manhattan Railway elevated station (closed 1940)

80th St.

General information
- Location: East 80th Street and 2nd Avenue; Yorkville, Manhattan, New York
- Coordinates: 40°46′27.46″N 73°57′15.68″W
- System: Former Manhattan Railway elevated station
- Operator: Interborough Rapid Transit Company
- Line: Second Avenue Line
- Platforms: 2 side platforms
- Tracks: 3

Construction
- Structure type: Elevated

History
- Opened: March 1, 1880; 146 years ago
- Closed: June 11, 1940; 86 years ago

Former services
Preceding station	Interborough Rapid Transit	Following station
86th Street toward 129th Street	Second Avenue Local	72nd Street toward South Ferry
Location

The 80th Street station was a local station on the demolished IRT Second Avenue Line in Manhattan, New York City. It had three tracks and two side platforms. The next stop to the north was 86th Street. The next stop to the south was 72nd Street. The station closed on June 11, 1940.
