= 111th Street station (IRT Second Avenue Line) =

Former Manhattan Railway elevated station (closed 1940)

111th St.

General information
- Location: East 111th Street and 2nd Avenue; East Harlem, Manhattan, New York
- Coordinates: 40°47′37.72″N 73°56′24.35″W
- System: Former Manhattan Railway elevated station
- Operator: Interborough Rapid Transit Company
- Line: Second Avenue Line
- Platforms: 2 side platforms
- Tracks: 3

Construction
- Structure type: Elevated

History
- Opened: March 1, 1880; 146 years ago
- Closed: June 11, 1940; 86 years ago

Former services
Preceding station	Interborough Rapid Transit	Following station
117th Street toward 129th Street	Second Avenue Local	105th Street toward South Ferry
Location

The 111th Street station was a local station on the demolished IRT Second Avenue Line in Manhattan, New York City. It had three tracks and two side platforms. The next stop to the north was 117th Street. The next stop to the south was 105th Street. The station closed on June 11, 1940.
