= 57th Street station (IRT Second Avenue Line) =

Former Manhattan Railway elevated station (closed 1940)

57TH ST.

General information
- Location: East 57th Street and 2nd Avenue; Midtown Manhattan, Manhattan, New York
- Coordinates: 40°45′33.52″N 73°57′55.07″W
- System: Former Manhattan Railway elevated station
- Operator: Interborough Rapid Transit Company; City of New York (after 1940)
- Lines: Second Avenue Line; 59th Street Bridge Spur
- Platforms: 2 island platforms (lower level); 1 island platform (upper level)
- Tracks: 5 (3 – main line) (2 – 59th St. Bridge)

Construction
- Structure type: Elevated

History
- Opened: March 1, 1880; 146 years ago
- Closed: June 13, 1942; 84 years ago

Former services
Preceding station	Interborough Rapid Transit	Following station
86th Street toward Bronx Park	Second Avenue Express	42nd Street toward City Hall
Queensboro Plaza toward Ditmars Boulevard	Second Avenue Queens	42nd Street toward City Hall
65th Street toward 129th Street	Second Avenue Local	50th Street toward South Ferry
Location

The 57th Street station was an express station on the demolished IRT Second Avenue Line in Manhattan, New York City. It had two levels. The lower level had three tracks and two island platforms and served trains coming from the Bronx. The upper level had two tracks and one island platform and served trains coming from Queens, from the IRT Flushing Line, and IRT Astoria Line. The next stop to the north was 65th Street for local trains going to the Bronx, and Queensboro Plaza for trains going to Queens. The next express stop was 86th Street on Bronx-bound trains. The next stop to the south was 50th Street for all local trains and 42nd Street for express trains. The station closed on June 13, 1942, although trains to the Bronx stopped serving it on June 11, 1940.
