= 50th Street station (IRT Second Avenue Line) =

Former Manhattan Railway elevated station (closed 1942)

50th St.

General information
- Location: East 50th Street and 2nd Avenue; Midtown Manhattan, Manhattan, New York
- Coordinates: 40°45′17.51″N 73°58′6.7″W
- System: Former Manhattan Railway elevated station
- Operator: Interborough Rapid Transit Company; City of New York (after 1940)
- Line: Second Avenue Line
- Platforms: 2 side platforms
- Tracks: 3

Construction
- Structure type: Elevated

History
- Opened: March 1, 1880; 146 years ago
- Closed: June 13, 1942; 84 years ago

Former services
| Preceding station | Interborough Rapid Transit | Following station |
|---|---|---|
| 57th Street toward 129th Street | Second Avenue Local | 42nd Street toward South Ferry |
Location

The 50th Street station was a local station on the demolished IRT Second Avenue Line in Manhattan, New York City. It had three tracks and two side platforms. The next stop to the north was 57th Street. The next stop to the south was 42nd Street. The station closed on June 13, 1942.
