= 86th Street station (IRT Second Avenue Line) =

Former Manhattan Railway elevated station (closed 1940)

86TH ST.

General information
- Location: East 86th Street and 2nd Avenue; Yorkville, Manhattan, New York
- Coordinates: 40°46′40.33″N 73°57′6.25″W
- System: Former Manhattan Railway elevated station
- Operator: Interborough Rapid Transit Company
- Line: Second Avenue Line
- Platforms: 4 side platforms (2 on each level)
- Tracks: 2 (lower level); 1 (upper level)

Construction
- Structure type: Elevated
- Platform levels: 2

History
- Opened: March 1, 1880; 146 years ago
- Closed: June 11, 1940; 86 years ago

Former services
| Preceding station | Interborough Rapid Transit | Following station |
|---|---|---|
| 125th Street toward Bronx Park | Second Avenue Express | 57th Street toward City Hall |
| 92nd Street toward 129th Street | Second Avenue Local | 80th Street toward South Ferry |
Location

The 86th Street station was an express station on the demolished IRT Second Avenue Line in Manhattan, New York City. It had two levels. The lower level had two tracks and two side platforms, and was served by local trains. The upper level was built as a part of the Dual Contracts and had one track and two side platforms for express trains. The next stop to the north was 92nd Street for local trains and 125th Street for express trains. The next stop to the south was 80th Street for local trains and 57th Street for express trains. The station closed on June 11, 1940. The site is now served by the 86th Street station of the Second Avenue Subway.
