= 116th Street station (IRT Third Avenue Line) =

Former Manhattan Railway elevated station (closed 1955)

116th ST.

General information
- Location: East 116th Street and 3rd Avenue; Upper Manhattan, Manhattan, New York
- Coordinates: 40°47′53″N 73°56′24″W
- System: Former Manhattan Railway elevated station
- Operator: Interborough Rapid Transit Company; City of New York (1940–1953); New York City Transit Authority
- Line: Third Avenue Line
- Platforms: 2 side platforms
- Tracks: 3

Construction
- Structure type: Elevated

History
- Opened: December 30, 1878; 147 years ago
- Closed: May 12, 1955; 71 years ago

Former services
Preceding station	Interborough Rapid Transit	Following station
125th Street toward 129th Street	Third Avenue Local	106th Street toward South Ferry
Location

The 116th Street station was a local station on the demolished IRT Third Avenue Line in Manhattan, New York City. It is located in the neighborhood of Harlem. The outer tracks had two side platforms for local trains, and was built first. The center track was built as part of the Dual Contracts for express trains. This station closed on May 12, 1955, with the ending of all service on the Third Avenue El south of 149th Street.
