= T (New York City Subway service) =

Future New York City Subway service

- Second Avenue Local
- Northern end: Broadway (Planned)
- Southern end: Hanover Square (Planned)
- Stations: 19
- Started service: June 24, 1916; 110 years ago (West End service)
- Discontinued: November 26, 1967; 58 years ago (West End through service); July 1, 1968; 58 years ago (West End shuttle)

The T Second Avenue Local is a prospective rapid transit service in the B Division of the New York City Subway. It is proposed to run on the Second Avenue Subway in Manhattan and its route symbol will be turquoise.

The first phase of the Second Avenue Subway opened in January 2017, from 63rd Street to 96th Street, and is served by the Q train. The full Second Avenue Line will be built in four phases, and the planned T service will not run until the third phase of the line opens from Houston Street to 63rd Street. Currently, the third phase is not funded or scheduled.

From 1961 to 1968, the T and TT designations were also used for trains running along the BMT West End Line in Brooklyn, which was replaced by the B train and later by the W. The West End Line is now served by the D train.

== Historical designation ==
=== Original service ===
The T designation was originally used for West End local and express trains in Brooklyn. The elevated BMT West End Line opened in 1916, replacing the original West End surface Line that opened in 1863 and branched off of the former Fifth Avenue Elevated. The BMT West End Line connected to the recently opened BMT Fourth Avenue Line subway. The new elevated line's service was originally labeled 3 by the Brooklyn-Manhattan Transit Corporation (BMT). On June 24, 1916, 3 service began running between 18th Avenue and Chambers Street on the BMT Nassau Street Line via the Manhattan Bridge and the Nassau Street Loop. This service was extended to 25th Avenue on July 29, 1916 and Coney Island–Stillwell Avenue on December 23, 1918.

On September 4, 1917, the first part of the BMT Broadway Line opened, and 3 service ran to 14th Street–Union Square. Chambers Street service was probably suspended until the remainder of the Nassau Street loop was completed. Service began running to the newly opened Times Square–42nd Street station on January 15, 1918. Service began running part-time to 57th Street–Seventh Avenue on July 10, 1919, and this extension was probably axed in 1920.

The BMT Nassau Street Line and the Nassau Loop were completed on May 31, 1931. Weekday rush hour service and Saturday morning local resumed service from Bay Parkway or 62nd Street to Chambers Street running via the Montague Tunnel, and returning via the Manhattan Bridge south tracks.

The Saturday morning rush hour local service to Chambers Street, on June 24, 1950, was discontinued. All express trains began running to 57th Street on May 2, 1957. On October 24, 1957, late night service was replaced by locals to Chambers Street, running via the tunnel in both directions, and terminating at Coney Island–Stillwell Avenue. Express service was eliminated during middays, being replaced by locals extended to Coney Island on May 28, 1959. At this time all locals to Chambers Street began running via the tunnel in both directions.

Letters began appearing in the summer of 1961, when R27 subway cars began running on the line. Express trains were given the label of T, and the locals were given the label of TT, in accordance with the Independent Subway System's old system labeling express trains with single letters and local trains with double letters. On January 1, 1961, rush hour T expresses began running to Astoria–Ditmars Boulevard in along the BMT Astoria Line in Queens, and until April 2, 1962 so did Saturday service. TT local service on January 1 began running between Bay Parkway and Chambers Street. During middays, local service only ran between Coney Island and Chambers Street. After April 2, 1962, T service began running to 57th Street during evenings and Saturdays; on nights and Sundays TT shuttle service ran to 36th Street. On May 2, 1962, T trains ceased stopping at 49th Street.

=== Post-Chrystie Street Connection ===
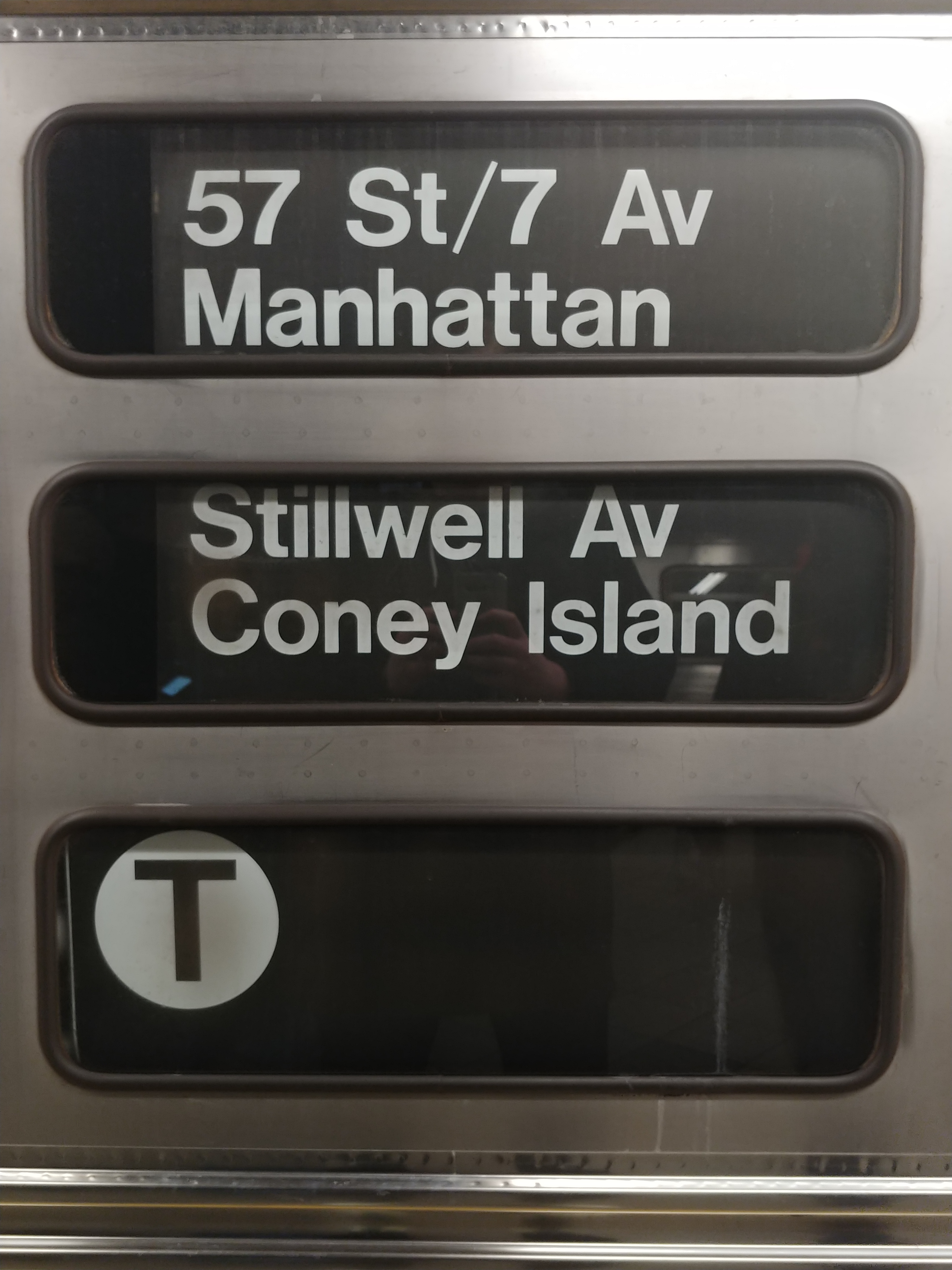
The T bullet appearing on an R32 rollsign

The T was discontinued on November 26, 1967, after the Chrystie Street Connection opened. This connection linked the new express tracks of the IND Sixth Avenue Line to the Manhattan Bridge, allowing for increased subway service between Brooklyn and Midtown Manhattan. As a consequence, the connection between the Nassau Street Line and the Manhattan Bridge was severed, ending the Nassau Street Loop in Lower Manhattan. The BB, a Sixth Avenue Line service which formerly operated solely in Manhattan, was now extended to Brooklyn via the Manhattan Bridge, running along the BMT Fourth Avenue Line and BMT West End Line to Coney Island. This new B service replaced T and TT service into Manhattan. However, late-night and Sunday shuttle service between Coney Island and 36th Street was still labeled TT. The new color scheme for subway routes introduced that day included a blue TT bullet. On July 1, 1968, the TT designation was discontinued entirely with late-night and Sunday shuttle service labeled B instead.

In the 40 or so years after the opening of the Chrystie Street Connection, a series of service changes caused by construction work led to service patterns temporarily mimicking those of the original T and TT services. From April 26, 1986 to December 11, 1988, the northern tracks of the Manhattan Bridge, leading to the Sixth Avenue Line, closed for repairs, akin to the conditions of the subway prior to the opening of the Chrystie Street Connection. During this time, the T's old service pattern was almost exactly recreated, with B service running via Broadway Express from Coney Island to Astoria–Ditmars Boulevard during rush hours, and during middays, evenings and weekends to Queensboro Plaza. The TT's route via the BMT Nassau Street Line was replicated in 1987, when the M was rerouted from the Brighton Line to the West End Line running to Bay Parkway. The M ran on the BMT Nassau Street and West End Lines on weekdays until June 25, 2010.

The Manhattan Bridge's north side tracks closed for repairs again on July 22, 2001; B service in Brooklyn via the Sixth Avenue Line was replaced by the new W service, running via Broadway express to Astoria-Ditmars Boulevard, essentially recreating the T route once again. This lasted until February 22, 2004, when, following the completion of repairs to the Manhattan Bridge, the D was rerouted over the West End Line, providing full-time service via Sixth Avenue Express, which continues today.

The T bullet appeared on some rollsigns on older railcars as a black letter on a white circle. The T was programmed into R44 and R46 side signs as a West End route, with various Broadway, Sixth Avenue and Nassau Street designations.

== Planned Second Avenue Subway service ==
=== Designation ===
During planning for the Second Avenue Subway in the early 2000s, the MTA decided to designate the line's future full-length service with the letter T, in part because:

- The letters O and I are too easily confused with the digits 0 and 1, respectively.
- The letter K was used until the late 1980s to denote services on the IND Eighth Avenue Line, and earlier on the BMT Jamaica Line, and thus is not preferred.
- The letter V was in use at the time (and until 2010) to denote services on the IND Sixth Avenue Line and IND Queens Boulevard Line.
- H is the Rockaway Park Shuttle's internal route designator.
- The letters P, U and Y are more easily confused with common words.

The T's route emblem is colored turquoise (hex triplet #00ADD0, which could also be considered robin's egg blue or teal) because the color had also been used for the JFK Express in the past. In 2011, turquoise was considered "the color of the year", and at the time of the color's selection in the 2000s, it was also considered a very upscale color.

== Signage history ==
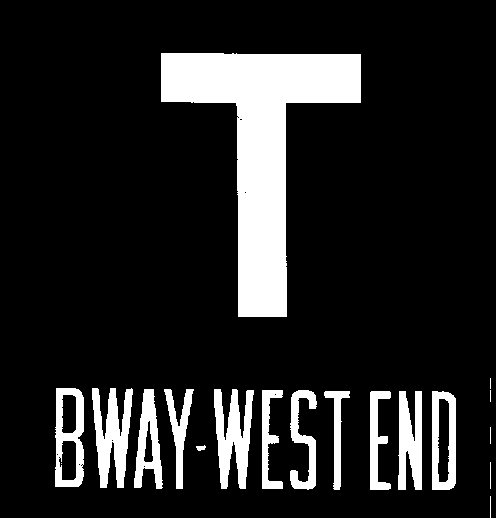
The BMT T bullet used on the R26s and R32s

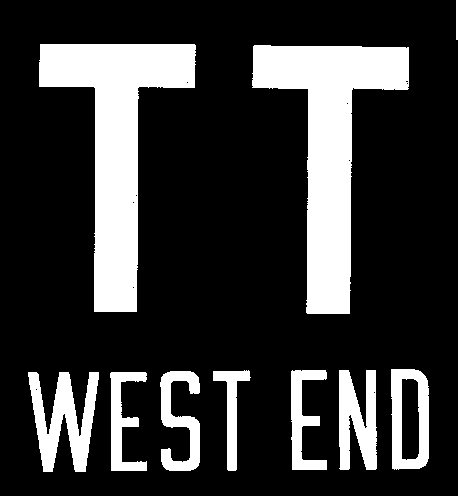
The BMT TT bullet used on the R26s and R32s

1967-1968 TT bullet

Unused T bullet from 1988

The current T bullet which will be used when the line will open

=== Planned service pattern ===
When the construction of the Second Avenue Subway's Phase 3 is completed, the proposed T service will operate from Harlem–125th Street to Houston Street. After Phase 4 opens, T service will run the full length of the line, from Harlem–125th Street to Hanover Square. The new T service is planned to operate at a frequency of 14 trains per hour during rush hours.

As planned, the T will use the following lines with the same service pattern at all times.

Line	From	To	Tracks
IND Second Avenue Line	Harlem–125th Street	Houston Street (Phase 3)	all
IND Second Avenue Line	Harlem–125th Street	Hanover Square (Phase 4)	all

=== Planned station listing ===
Should Phase 3 of the Second Avenue Subway be built, the proposed T route would run entirely in Manhattan and would be the only non-shuttle New York City Subway service to run only within one borough.

Station service legend
Stops all times	Stops 24 hours a day
Stops all times except late nights	Stops every day during daytime hours only
Stops late nights only	Stops every day during overnight hours only
Stops weekdays during the day	Stops during weekday daytime hours only
Stops rush hours only	Stops during weekday rush hours only
Station closed	Station closed
Stops rush hours in the peak direction only	Stops rush hours/weekdays in the peak direction only
Time period details
Disabled access	Station is compliant with the Americans with Disabilities Act
↑	Station is compliant with the Americans with Disabilities Act in the indicated direction only
↓	Station is compliant with the Americans with Disabilities Act in the indicated direction only
	Elevator access to mezzanine only

Station	Disabled access	Phase	Transfers and connections	Notes
Manhattan
Introduction in Phase 3
Broadway	Disabled access	Crosstown extension	N Q R 1 (IRT Broadway–Seventh Avenue Line) at 125th Street	Northern terminal station for T train
St. Nicholas Avenue	Disabled access	Crosstown extension	N Q R A B C D (IND Eighth Avenue Line) at 125th Street; M60 Select Bus Service to LaGuardia Airport	
Lenox Avenue	Disabled access	Crosstown extension	N Q R 2 3 (IRT Lenox Avenue Line) at 125th Street; M60 Select Bus Service to LaGuardia Airport	
Harlem–125th Street	Disabled access	2	N Q R 4 5 6 <6> (IRT Lexington Avenue Line) at 125th Street; M60 Select Bus Service to LaGuardia Airport connection to Harlem–125th Street (Metro-North Railroad)	at Lexington Avenue and 125th Street
116th Street	Disabled access	2	N Q R	
106th Street	Disabled access	2	N Q R	
96th Street	Disabled access	1	N Q R	
86th Street	Disabled access	1	N Q R	
72nd Street	Disabled access	1	N Q R	
55th Street	Disabled access	3	E F <F> (IND Queens Boulevard Line) at Lexington Avenue–53rd Street; 4 6 <6> (IRT Lexington Avenue Line) at 51st Street	
42nd Street	Disabled access	3	7 <7> (IRT Flushing Line); S (IRT 42nd Street Shuttle); 4 5 6 <6> (IRT Lexington Avenue Line) at Grand Central–42nd Street connection to Grand Central Terminal (Metro-North Railroad and Long Island Rail Road)	
34th Street	Disabled access	3	M34/M34A Select Bus Service	
23rd Street	Disabled access	3	M23 Select Bus Service	
14th Street	Disabled access	3	L (BMT Canarsie Line) at Third Avenue	
Houston Street	Disabled access	3	F <F> (IND Sixth Avenue Line) at Second Avenue	Southern terminal station for T train (Phase 3)
Phase 4 extension
Grand Street	Disabled access	4	B D (IND Sixth Avenue Line)	
Chatham Square	Disabled access	4		at Worth Street
Seaport	Disabled access	4		at Fulton Street
Hanover Square	Disabled access	4		at Old Slip; Southern terminal station for T train (Phase 4)
