= Second Avenue (Manhattan) =

North-south avenue in Manhattan, New York

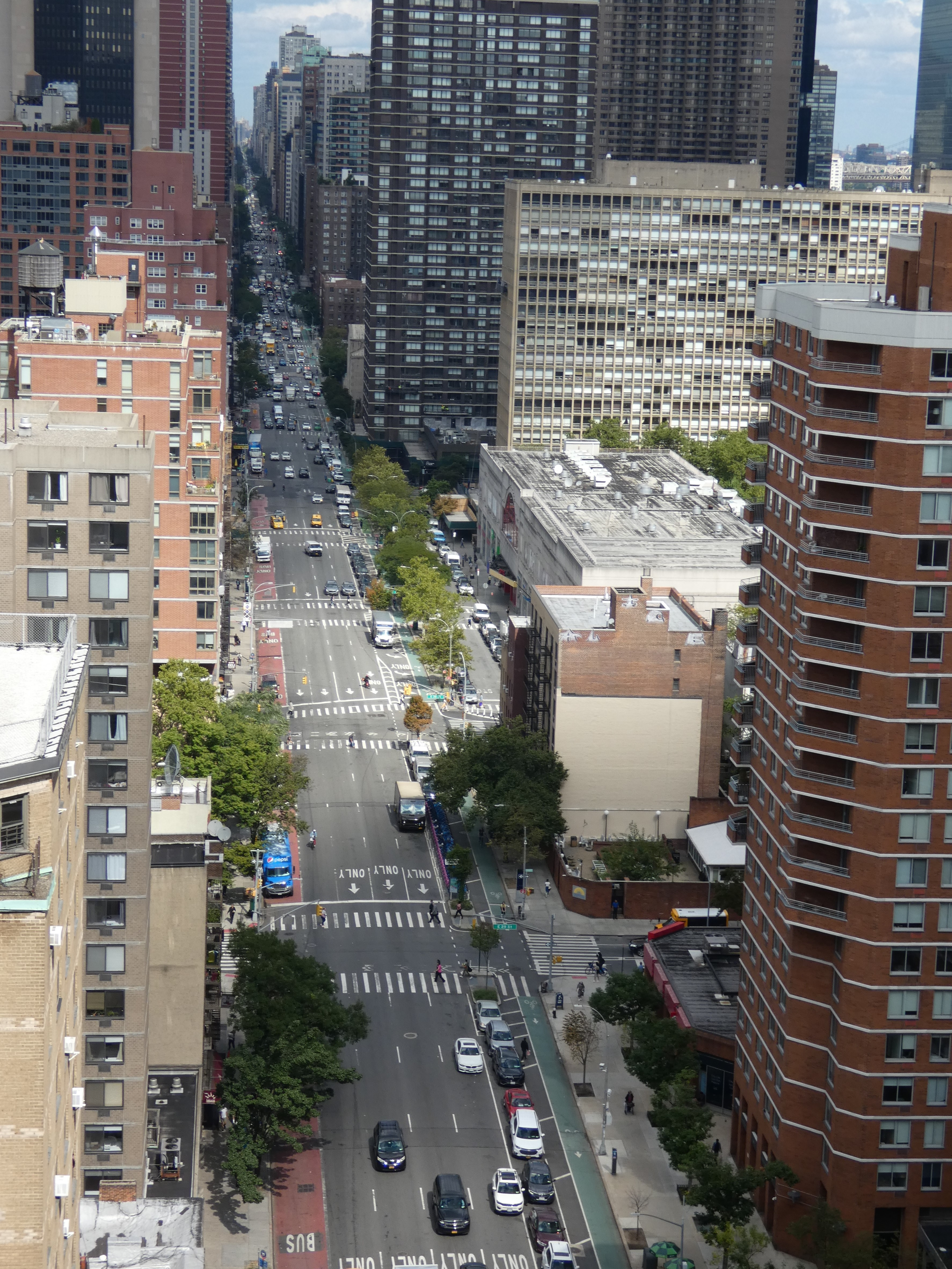
- Owner: City of New York
- Maintained by: NYCDOT
- Length: 6.4 mi (10.3 km)
- Location: Manhattan, New York City
- South end: Houston / Chrystie Streets in Lower East Side
- Major junctions: NY 25 in East Midtown; NY 900G in East Harlem
- North end: Harlem River Drive in East Harlem
- East: First Avenue
- West: Third Avenue

Construction
- Commissioned: March 1811

Second Avenue is located on the East Side of the New York City borough of Manhattan extending from Houston Street at its south end to the Harlem River Drive at 128th Street at its north end. A one-way street, vehicular traffic on Second Avenue runs southbound (downtown) only, except for a one-block segment of the avenue in Harlem. South of Houston Street, the roadway continues as Chrystie Street south to Canal Street.

A bicycle lane runs in the leftmost lane of Second Avenue from 125th to Houston Streets. The section from 55th to 34th Streets closes a gap in the Manhattan Waterfront Greenway.

Second Avenue passes through a number of Manhattan neighborhoods including (from south to north) the Lower East Side, the East Village, Stuyvesant Square, Kips Bay, Tudor City, Turtle Bay, East Midtown, Lenox Hill, Yorkville and Spanish Harlem.

== History ==
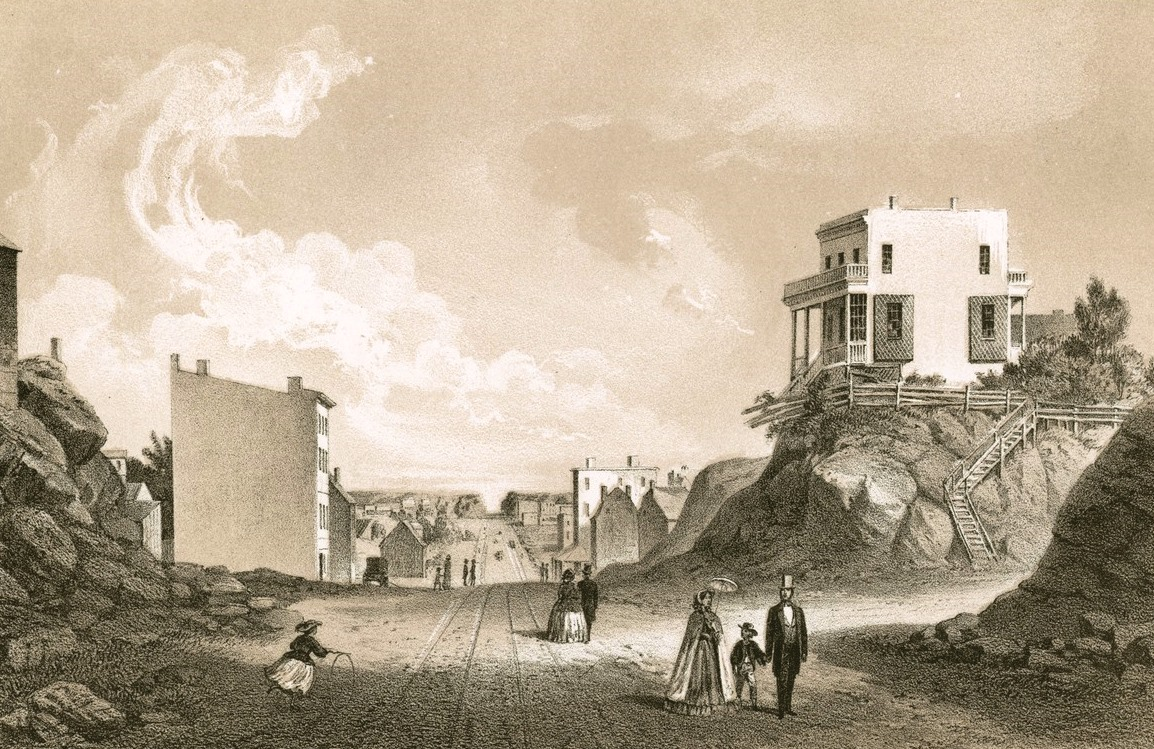
Second Avenue facing north from 42nd Street in 1861

Sacking a drug store in Second Avenue during the Draft Riots of 1963

Downtown Second Avenue on the Lower East Side was the home to many Yiddish theatre productions during the early part of the 20th century, and Second Avenue came to be known as the "Yiddish Theater District", "Yiddish Broadway", or the "Jewish Rialto". Although the theaters are gone, many traces of Jewish immigrant culture remain, such as kosher delicatessens and bakeries, and the famous Second Avenue Deli (which closed in 2006, later reopening on East 33rd Street near Third Avenue).

The Second Avenue Elevated train line ran above Second Avenue the full length of the avenue north of 23rd Street, and stood from 1880 until service was ended on June 13, 1942. South of Second Avenue, it ran on First Avenue and then Allen and Division Streets. The elevated trains were noisy and often dirty (in the 19th century they were pulled by soot-spewing steam locomotives). This depressed land values along Second Avenue during the late 19th and early 20th centuries. Partially because of the presence of the El, most buildings constructed during this era were working-class tenements. The line was finally torn down in 1942 because it was deteriorated and obsolete, and the cost of World War II made upkeep impossible. Second Avenue maintains its modest architectural character today, despite running through a number of high-income areas.

Second Avenue has carried one-way traffic since June 4, 1951, before which it carried traffic in both the northbound and southbound directions.

A protected bike lane on the left, or east, side of the avenue between 59th and 68th streets was completed in 2019. This, along with previous bike lane projects, gave the avenue a continuous bike lane from 125th to 43rd Street. In March 2024, the NYCDOT announced plans to widen the bike lane on Second Avenue from 59th to Houston Street, as well as relocate the bus lane away from the curb. Work on the new bus and bike lanes began that June.

=== 2015 gas explosion ===
On March 26, 2015, a gas explosion and resulting fire in the East Village destroyed three buildings at 119, 121, and 123 Second Avenue, between East 7th Street and St. Mark's Place. At least twenty-two people were injured, four critically, and two people were initially listed as missing. Later, two men were found dead in the debris of the explosion and were confirmed to be the ones listed as missing. There had previously been an illegal tap installed into the gas line feeding 121 Second Avenue. In the days before the explosion, work was ongoing in the building for the installation of a new 4-inch gas line to service the apartments in 121, and some of the tenants had smelled gas an hour before the explosion.

Eleven other buildings were evacuated as a result of the explosion, and Con Ed turned off the gas to the area. A few residents were allowed to return to some of the vacated buildings several days later.

== Transportation ==
=== Bus service ===
The M15 local serves the entirety of Second Avenue south of East 126th Street. The M15 Select Bus Service, the Select Bus Service equivalent of the local M15 bus, provides bus rapid transit service along Second Avenue southbound. These two are the primary Second Avenue servers.

Other bus routes include the following:

- The westbound M125 runs from East 127th Street to Dr. Martin Luther King Jr. Boulevard.
- The eastbound M35 runs from East 124th Street to Dr. Martin Luther King Jr. Boulevard, where westbound buses run to East 126th Street.
- The westbound M96 runs from East 97th to East 96th Streets.
- Three Queens buses hop onto the Ed Koch Queensboro Bridge from one of three streets via the avenue:
  - The Q101 runs from East 61st Street.
  - The Q60 runs from East 60th Street.
  - The Q32 runs from East 59th Street.
- The eastbound M50 runs from East 50th to East 48th Streets.
- The downtown M34A Select Bus Service runs from East 34th to East 23rd Streets, along with the downtown M9 south of East 29th Street.

=== Subway ===
The Q train serves Second Avenue from 96th Street to 72nd Street before turning onto 63rd Street with a stop at Lexington Avenue, which has an exit at Third Avenue. A Second Avenue Subway line has been planned since 1919, with provisions to construct it as early as 1929.

Two short sections of the line have been completed over the years, serving other subway services (the Grand Street station is served by the B and D trains), and others simply sitting vacant underground (such as the unused upper level at the Second Avenue station on the F and <F> trains). Portions have been leased from time to time by New York Telephone to house equipment serving the company's principal north-south communication lines which run under the Avenue. Isolated 1970s-era segments of the line, built without any infrastructure, exist between Pell and Canal Streets, and between 99th–105th and 110th–120th Streets. Construction on Phase 1, which will eventually extend from 125th Street to the Financial District via the T service, began on April 12, 2007. Phase 1 connects the BMT 63rd Street Line with the new line north to stations at 72nd, 86th, and 96th Streets, serving the Q train. Phase 1 opened on January 1, 2017. Phase 2, which would extend the line to East Harlem at 125th Street and Lexington Avenue, is expected to be completed between 2027 and 2029. When the whole Second Avenue subway line is completed, it is projected to serve about 560,000 daily riders.

In January 2026, Kathy Hochul, the New York Governor, announced her support to extend the Second Avenue subway line to Broadway and West 125th Street in New York City's borough of Manhattan in her State of the State (New York's equivalent to State of the Union) speech.

=== Bike lane ===
There is a bicycle lane along the avenue south of 125th St.
