= IRT Second Avenue Line =

Former New York City rapid transit line

IRT Second Avenue Elevated
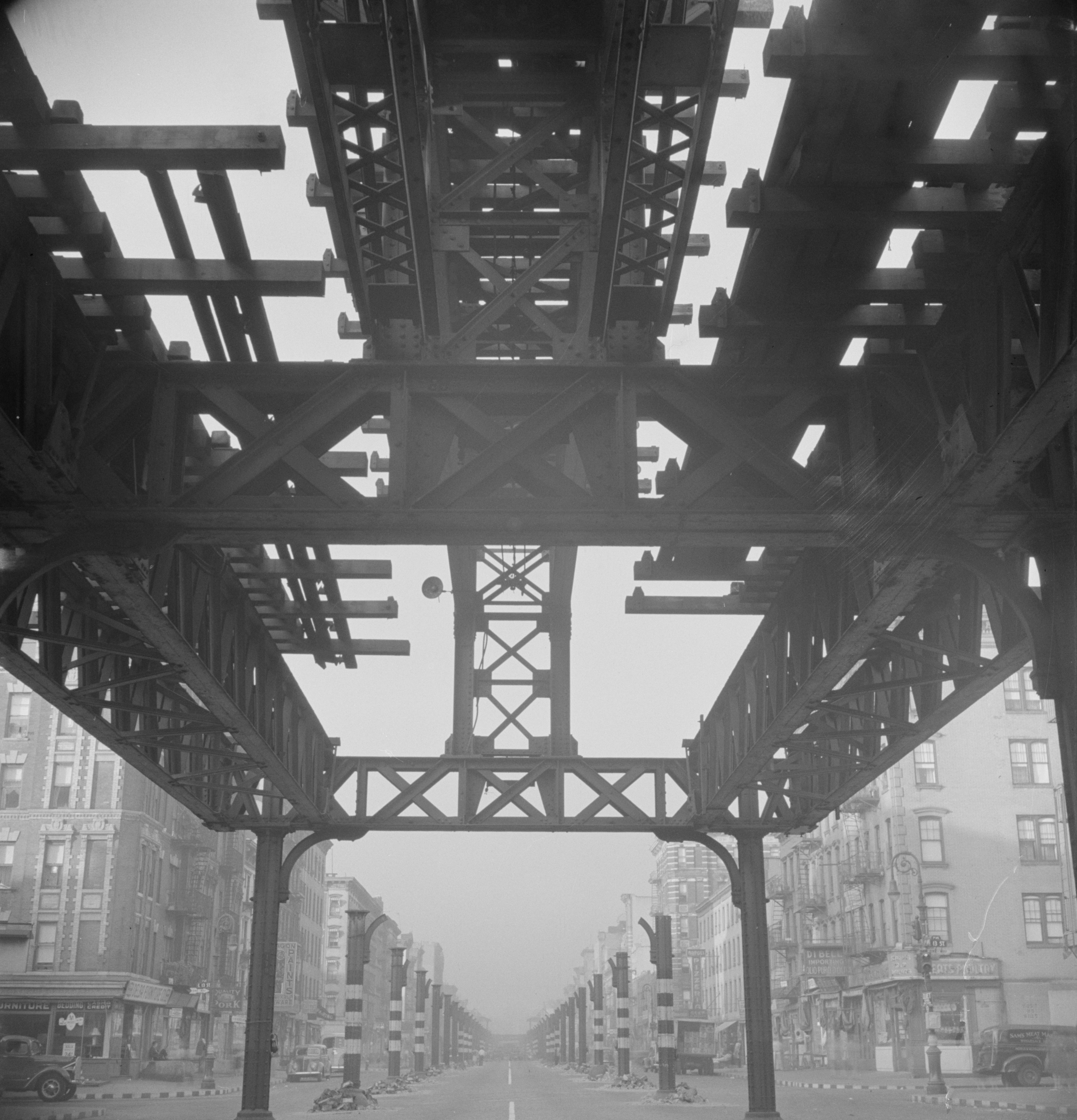
- The Second Avenue El, looking south on First Avenue from 13th Street during its demolition in September 1942

Overview
- Owner: City of New York
- Termini: 125th Street; City Hall South Ferry

Service
- Type: Rapid transit
- System: Interborough Rapid Transit Company
- Operator: New York City Transit Authority

History
- Opened: 1878
- Closed: 1940–1942

Technical
- Number of tracks: 2-3
- Character: Elevated
- Track gauge: 4 ft 8 1/2 in (1,435 mm) standard gauge

The IRT Second Avenue Line, also known as the Second Avenue Elevated or Second Avenue El, was an elevated railway in Manhattan, New York City, United States, from 1878 to 1942. It was operated by the Interborough Rapid Transit Company until 1940, when the city took over the IRT. Service north of the 57th Street station ended on June 11, 1940; the rest of the line closed on June 13, 1942.

== History ==
In 1875, the Rapid Transit Commission granted the Gilbert Elevated Railway Company the right to construct the railway from Battery Park to the Harlem River along Second Avenue.

The commission also granted the Gilbert Elevated Railway Company the right to operate the Sixth Avenue Elevated and soon afterward the Gilbert Elevated Railway changed its name to the Metropolitan Elevated Railway.

Around 1900, the line was electrified. Between 1914 and 1916 construction was undertaken to install a third track to provide express service on the line during peak hours. Express service commenced on January 17, 1916. On July 23, 1917, Second Avenue El service over the Queensboro Bridge to Queens began.

The Second Avenue El did not run entirely on Second Avenue. Its southern terminus was above Park Row adjacent to City Hall. From there it ran above Park Row to Chatham Square, where it had a junction with the Third Avenue El, then continued east above Division Street. It turned north above Allen Street to Houston Street, where it continued north above First Avenue, then turned left on 23rd Street, then ran north on Second Avenue to 129th Street. At that point it rejoined with the Third Avenue El and crossed the Harlem River into the Bronx.

As of 1934 Second Avenue service operated as follows:

- Second Avenue Local - day and evenings 129th Street to South Ferry, alternate evening and Sunday trains 129th Street to City Hall. No all-night service was operated.
- Second Avenue Express - Bronx Park to City Hall weekday and Saturday AM peak southbound, City Hall to Fordham Road or Tremont Avenue weekday PM peak northbound, also Freeman Street to City Hall via West Farms Road Line, making express stops in Manhattan.
- Second Avenue-Queens - South Ferry to Willets Point Blvd weekday and Saturday AM peak, City Hall to Willets Point Blvd weekday midday and PM peak, 57th Street to Willets Point Blvd evenings and Sundays. In addition City Hall to Astoria Weekday AM peak and midday and Saturday daytime, South Ferry to Astoria weekday PM peak, 57th Street to Astoria evenings and Sundays. Midday and Saturday trains used the express tracks, weekday peak trains made all stops.

On April 23, 1939 express service was inaugurated weekday and Saturday daytime in Queens between Queensboro Plaza and 111th Street, and elevated trains were cut back to 111th Street. On September 8, 1939 Astoria trains were rerouted in the weekday PM peak to City Hall. The Second Avenue Elevated was closed north of 59th Street June 12, 1940. Evening and Sunday Queens trains were extended to City Hall or South Ferry. On May 19, 1941 evening and Sunday service was discontinued. Finally, on June 13, 1942 all service was discontinued.

The M15 bus, which runs along much of the IRT Second Avenue Elevated Line's route, is one of the busiest bus routes in New York City. However, it does not carry as many passengers as a rapid transit line, and transfers to rapid transit stations can only be made using surface connections.

The Second Avenue Subway, a rapid transit route running under Second Avenue, has been under consideration since 1919. The demolition of the IRT Second Avenue Line was in anticipation of the subway's construction. The first phase, between 72nd Street and 96th Street, opened in 2017, and a second phase to Harlem–125th Street is being planned.

== Station listing ==
Station	Tracks	Opened	Closed	Transfers and notes
129th Street	Express	December 30, 1878	June 11, 1940	Transfer to Third Avenue Line
125th Street	Express		June 11, 1940	
121st Street	Local		June 11, 1940	
117th Street	Local		June 11, 1940	
111th Street	Local		June 11, 1940	
105th Street	Local		June 11, 1940	
99th Street	Local		June 11, 1940	
92nd Street	Local		June 11, 1940	
86th Street	Express		June 11, 1940	
80th Street	Local		June 11, 1940	
72nd Street	Local		June 11, 1940	
65th Street	Local	March 1, 1880	June 11, 1940	
57th Street	Express		June 13, 1942	
50th Street	Local		June 13, 1942	
42nd Street	Express	March 1, 1880	June 13, 1942	
34th Street	Local		June 13, 1942	Transfer to 34th Street Ferry Shuttle
23rd Street	Local	March 1, 1880	June 13, 1942	
19th Street	Local		June 13, 1942	
14th Street	Express	March 1, 1880	June 13, 1942	
Eighth Street	Local	March 1, 1880	June 13, 1942	
First Street	Local	March 1, 1880	June 13, 1942	
Rivington Street	Local	March 1, 1880	June 13, 1942	
Grand Street	Local	March 1, 1880	June 13, 1942	
Canal Street	Local	March 1, 1880	June 13, 1942	
Chatham Square	Express	March 1, 1880	May 12, 1955	Transfer to Third Avenue Line and City Hall Spur
Franklin Square	Express	August 26, 1878	December 22, 1950	
Fulton Street	Express	August 26, 1878	December 22, 1950	
Hanover Square	Express	August 26, 1878	December 22, 1950	
South Ferry	Express	August 26, 1878	December 22, 1950	
