= M35 and X80 buses =

Bus routes in Manhattan, New York

m35 x80
- Randalls/Wards Island Buses
- 2018 New Flyer XD40 #7730 on the X80 and 2017 NFI XD60 #6208 on the M35 at 125 St and Lexington Av

Overview
- System: MTA Regional Bus Operations
- Operator: Manhattan and Bronx Surface Transit Operating Authority
- Garage: Mother Clara Hale Depot (M35); Any depot can be used for the X80
- Vehicle: New Flyer Xcelsior XD60; Nova Bus LFS articulated New Flyer Xcelsior XDE40 (M35); X80 can use any fleet
- Began service: 1936 (M35); 2000s? (X80)

Route
- Locale: Manhattan, New vYork, U.S.
- Communities served: Randalls and Wards Islands, East Harlem
- Start: East Harlem – Lexington Avenue & 125th Street
- Via: RFK Bridge
- End: Randalls Island/Wards Island
- Length: 3.0 miles (4.8 km)

Service
- Operates: All times except late nights (M35); Special events (X80)
- Annual patronage: M35: 83,259 (2025)
- Transfers: Yes
- Timetable: M35

The M35 and X80 constitute bus routes between the 125th Street station at Lexington Avenue in Harlem and Randalls and Wards Islands.

== Route description ==
The M35 and X80 begin at 125th Street and Lexington Avenue. They both continue south until 124th Street, where they turn and run east until turning onto the RFK Bridge before exiting onto Randalls Island. They both then run south on Central Road and they pass Icahn Stadium, where the X80 terminates. The M35 takes a deviation at Rivers Edge Road to serve the Manhattan Psychiatric Center. The route continues south on Central Road as it becomes Hell Gate Circle, taking another deviation at Sunken Garden Loop to serve Sunken Garden and the Charles H. Gay Center. It then continues south on Hell Gate Circle until it loops back around onto Central Road where it heads north and passes by Icahn Stadium, where the X80 joins it as it continues north onto Bronx Shore Road, u-turning at the end of the road before turning right onto the RFK Bridge. They then turn onto 126th Street, where they continue westbound until turning left on Lexington Avenue and terminating there.

The X80 only runs during special events, and costs $7.25 for travel towards Randalls/Wards Islands, and is free towards Harlem.

== History ==
The TB bus route was started on July 11, 1936, by New York Omnibus Company, when the Triborough Bridge opened, after being announced that it would be studied if a shuttle service could be operated on the bridge. The route ran between Harlem, Randalls and Wards Islands, Port Morris and Astoria.

In 1974, the TB was split into three routes, with the M34 running between Harlem and Randalls Island, the M35 running between Harlem and Astoria, and the Bx21 running between Astoria and Port Morris.

The Bx21 was discontinued on February 18, 1984, due to low ridership. The M34 was combined with the M35 in the 1980s, sometime before the M34 designation was reused for the 34th Street Crosstown service.

In September 1992, when the M60 started service, M35 service to Astoria was reduced to rush hours only until 1995, when it was discontinued due to an ongoing budget crisis.

The X80 was started sometime in the 2000s as an express shuttle bus to Randalls Island during special events, with the M35 skipping the stop near Icahn Stadium whenever the X80 operates. On June 28, 2015, westbound M35 buses were rerouted to serve Hell Gate Circle after running on Sunken Garden Loop.
