= 106th Street station (IRT Third Avenue Line) =

Former Manhattan Railway elevated station (closed 1955)

106th St.

General information
- Location: East 106th Street and 3rd Avenue; Upper Manhattan, Manhattan, New York
- Coordinates: 40°47′30″N 73°56′40″W
- System: Former Manhattan Railway elevated station
- Operator: Interborough Rapid Transit Company; City of New York (1940–1953); New York City Transit Authority
- Line: Third Avenue Line
- Platforms: 4 side platforms (2 on each level)
- Tracks: 3 (1 – upper level) (2 – lower level)

Construction
- Structure type: Elevated

History
- Opened: December 30, 1878; 147 years ago
- Closed: May 12, 1955; 71 years ago

Former services
Preceding station	Interborough Rapid Transit	Following station
125th Street toward Bronx Park	Third Avenue Local-Express	42nd Street toward City Hall
116th Street toward 129th Street	Third Avenue Local	99th Street toward South Ferry
Location

The 106th Street station was an express station on the demolished IRT Third Avenue Line in Manhattan, New York City. The station was opened on December 30, 1878, and had two levels. The lower level had two tracks and two side platforms and served local trains. The upper level had one track and two side platforms over the local tracks on the lower level and served express trains. It was built as part of the Dual Contracts. The express run from this stop to 42nd Street was the longest express segment out of all New York City elevated lines, bypassing eight local stations. This station closed on May 12, 1955, with the ending of all service on the Third Avenue El south of 149th Street.
