= 125th Street station (IRT Lexington Avenue Line) =

New York City Subway station in Manhattan

125 Street
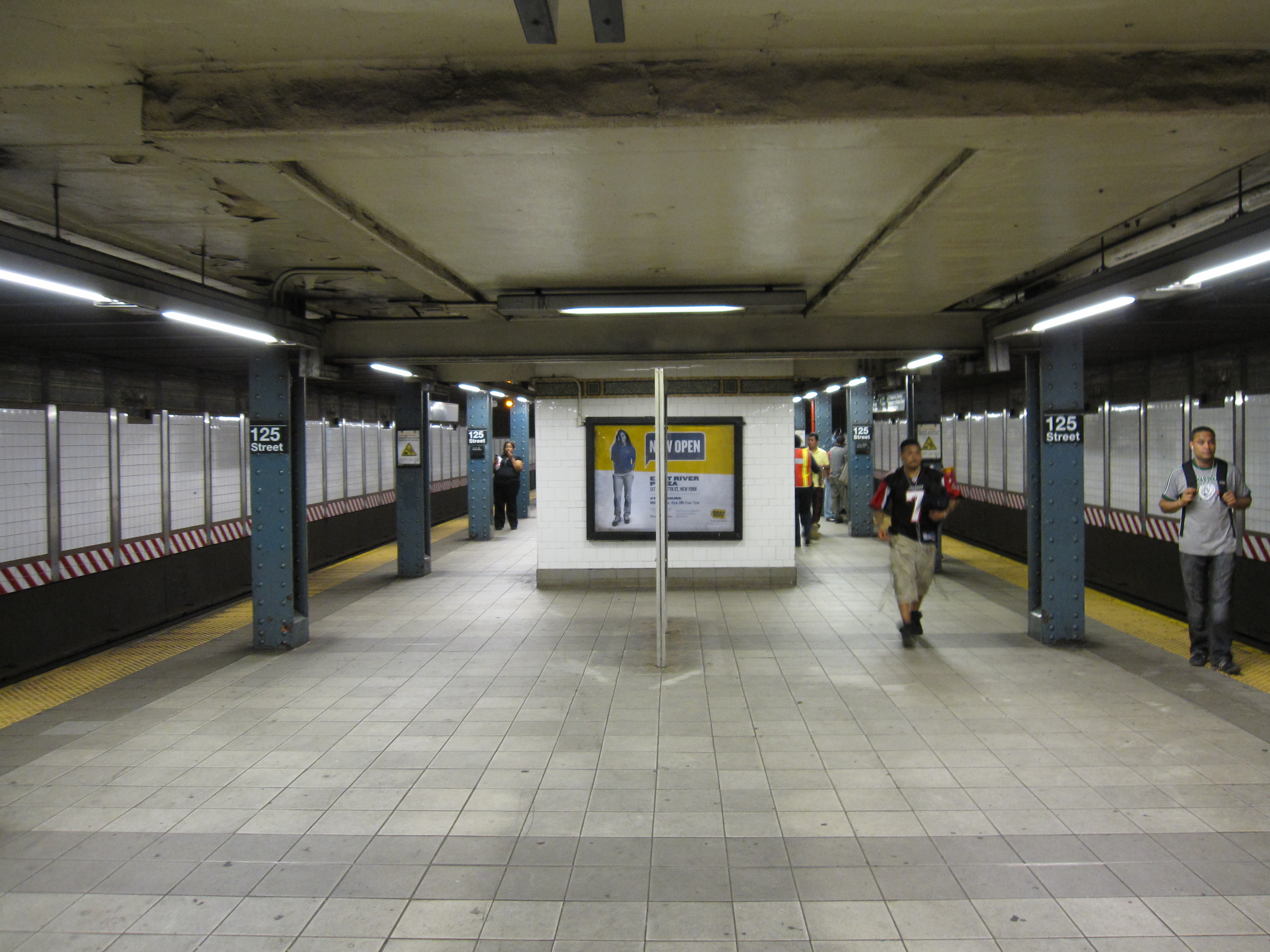
- Station platform

Station statistics
- Address: East 125th Street & Lexington Avenue; New York, New York
- Borough: Manhattan
- Locale: East Harlem
- Coordinates: 40.804259°N 73.937473°W
- Division: A (IRT)
- Line: IRT Lexington Avenue Line
- Services: 4 (all times); 5 (all times except late nights); 6 (all times) <6> (weekdays until 8:45 p.m., peak direction)
- Transit: NYCT Bus: M35, M60 SBS, M98, M101, M103, M125; Short Line Bus: 208; Metro-North: Harlem, Hudson, and New Haven Lines (at Harlem–125th Street)
- Structure: Underground
- Levels: 2
- Platforms: 2 island platforms (1 on each level) cross-platform interchange
- Tracks: 4 (2 on each level)

Other information
- Opened: July 17, 1918; 108 years ago
- Accessible: Yes

Traffic
- 2025: 5,788,214 ▲7.4%
- Rank: 50 out of 423
Services
Preceding station	New York City Subway	Following station
149th Street–Hostos 4 express	Express	86th Street 4 5 via Franklin Avenue–Medgar Evers College
138th Street–Grand Concourse 4 5 services split	Express	86th Street 4 5 via Franklin Avenue–Medgar Evers College
Third Avenue–138th Street 6 <6> toward Pelham Bay Park	Local	116th Street 4 6 <6> toward Brooklyn Bridge–City Hall
Location
Location within New York City Subway
Location within New York City
Location within New York
Track layout
Upper level
Lower level
Street map
Station service legend
Symbol	Description
Stops all times except late nights	Stops all times except late nights
Stops all times except rush hours in the peak direction	Stops all times except rush hours in the peak direction
Stops all times	Stops all times
Stops late nights only	Stops late nights only
Stops rush hours in the peak direction only	Stops rush hours in the peak direction only

The 125th Street station (referred to on some strip maps as 125th Street–Lexington Avenue) is an express station on the IRT Lexington Avenue Line of the New York City Subway. Located at Lexington Avenue and East 125th Street (also known as Dr. Martin Luther King Jr. Boulevard) in the East Harlem neighborhood of Manhattan, it is served by the 4 and 6 trains at all times, the 5 train at all times except late nights, and the <6> train during weekdays in peak direction. The station contains four tracks and two island platforms split across two levels. The upper level is used by northbound trains to the Bronx, while the lower level is used by southbound trains to Lower Manhattan and Brooklyn.

This station was constructed as part of the Dual Contracts by the Interborough Rapid Transit Company and opened in 1918. A planned northern extension of the Second Avenue Subway, once built, will connect with this station and with the Metro-North Railroad's Harlem–125th Street station, located one block west.

== History ==
=== Construction and opening ===
Following the completion of the original subway, there were plans to construct a line along Manhattan's east side north of 42nd Street. The original plan for what became the extension north of 42nd Street was to continue it south through Irving Place and into what is now the BMT Broadway Line at Ninth Street and Broadway. In July 1911, the IRT had withdrawn from the talks, and the Brooklyn Rapid Transit Company (BRT) was to operate on Lexington Avenue. The IRT submitted an offer for what became its portion of the Dual Contracts on February 27, 1912.

In May 1912, it was decided to modify the planned layout of the station from three tracks and two island platforms on each level, to two tracks and one island platform per level, saving $1.25 million.

In 1913, as part of the Dual Contracts, which were signed on March 19, 1913, the Public Service Commission planned to split the original Interborough Rapid Transit Company (IRT) system from looking like a "Z" system (as seen on a map) to an H-shaped system. The original system would be split into three segments: two north–south lines, carrying through trains over the Lexington Avenue and Broadway–Seventh Avenue Lines, and a west–east shuttle under 42nd Street. This would form a roughly H-shaped system. It was predicted that the subway extension would lead to the growth of the Upper East Side and the Bronx.

The 125th Street station opened on July 17, 1918, as part of the extension of the original subway up Lexington Avenue to 125th Street and into the Bronx. Initially, service was provided only as a shuttle on the local tracks of the Lexington Avenue Line starting at Grand Central, continuing past this station and under the Harlem River to 167th Street on the IRT Jerome Avenue Line. On August 1, the "H system" was put into place, with through service beginning on the new east and west side trunk lines, and the institution of the 42nd Street Shuttle along the old connection between the sides. Express service began on this date. The cost of the extension from Grand Central was $58 million.

The opening of this station resulted in development of the surrounding neighborhood of East Harlem.

=== Later years ===
The city government took over the IRT's operations on June 12, 1940. In 1952 or 1953, a public address system was installed at this station, providing information to passengers and train crews.

In late 1959, contracts were awarded to extend the platforms at Bowling Green, Wall Street, Fulton Street, Canal Street, Spring Street, Bleecker Street, Astor Place, Grand Central, 86th Street and 125th Street to 525 feet (160 m) to accommodate ten-car trains.

In 1981, the Metropolitan Transportation Authority listed the station among the 69 most deteriorated stations in the subway system. The station's elevators were installed in November 1989, making the station one of the earliest to comply with the Americans with Disabilities Act of 1990. This station was renovated in 2005.

In July 2023, as part of a pilot program to deter assaults on New York City Transit staff, the MTA painted "no standing zones" on the 125th Street station's platforms near the centers of each train. In October 2026, the MTA announced plans to install taller fare gates with glass panels at 20 additional stations, including the 125th Street station, following a successful pilot program at earlier stations.

== Station layout ==
The station is unusual in design for an IRT station, being a bi-level station with island platforms. The 4 and 6 trains stop here at all times; the 5 train stops here at all times except late nights; and the <6> train stops here during weekdays in the peak direction. The 5 train always makes express stops, and the 6 and <6> trains always make local stops; the 4 train makes express stops during the day and local stops at night.

Unlike at other bilevel express stations on an IRT line, the tracks are not grouped so that express and local trains are on different levels. Instead, the upper platform serves northbound (uptown) trains and the lower level serves southbound (downtown) trains. Adding to the unusual design is the local track on each level having train doors open to the right; the express tracks likewise have doors opening to the left. North of the station, just after crossing the Harlem River, the line splits into the IRT Jerome Avenue Line (heading north) and the IRT Pelham Line (heading east). On the lower platform, each track comes from one line, and a flying junction south of the station allows trains to be diverted to the local or express track. The next station to the north is Third Avenue–138th Street for 6 and <6> trains on the Pelham Line, 149th Street–Hostos for afternoon 4 trains, and 138th Street–Grand Concourse for 4 and 5 trains on the Jerome Avenue Line. The next station to the south is 116th Street for local trains and 86th Street for express trains. Fixed platform barriers, which are intended to prevent commuters falling to the tracks, are positioned near the platform edges.

Throughout the station's history, this station has been one of the more important on the line as it is the northernmost transfer point between express trains to the IRT Jerome Avenue and White Plains Road Lines, and local trains to the IRT Pelham Line. There is an active tower at the north end of the upper platform; it is a satellite to the tower at Grand Central–42nd Street, which controls the entire length of the Lexington Avenue Line.

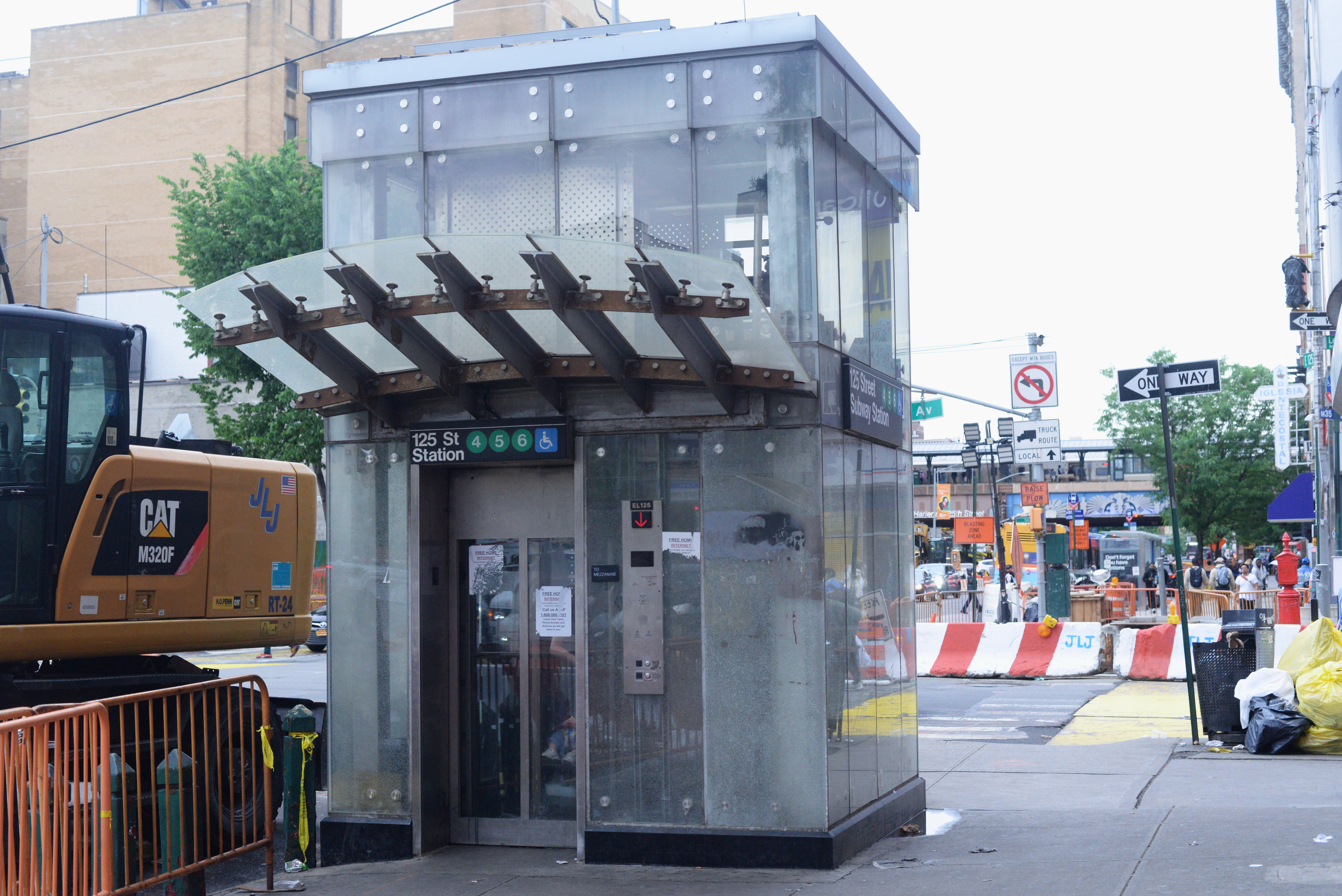
Elevator to the station

=== Exits ===
This station has a mezzanine with two separate turnstile banks. The northern turnstile bank leads to two staircases going to both northern corners of Lexington Avenue and 125th Street, and an elevator going to the northeastern corner of Lexington Avenue and 125th Street. The southern turnstile bank has two exits leading to both southern corners of Lexington Avenue and 125th Street.

A fifth entrance will be built as part of the proposed Second Avenue Subway station here. It would be located on the southern side of 125th Street in the median of Park Avenue, and an ancillary facility would be located one block south. The proposed fifth exit is right underneath Metro-North Railroad's Harlem–125th Street station on Park Avenue, which is one block west of the Lexington Avenue exits. An ancillary facility would also be built at the southeast corner of 125th Street and Third Avenue.

== Planned Second Avenue Subway station ==
Harlem–125 Street
- Future New York City Subway station
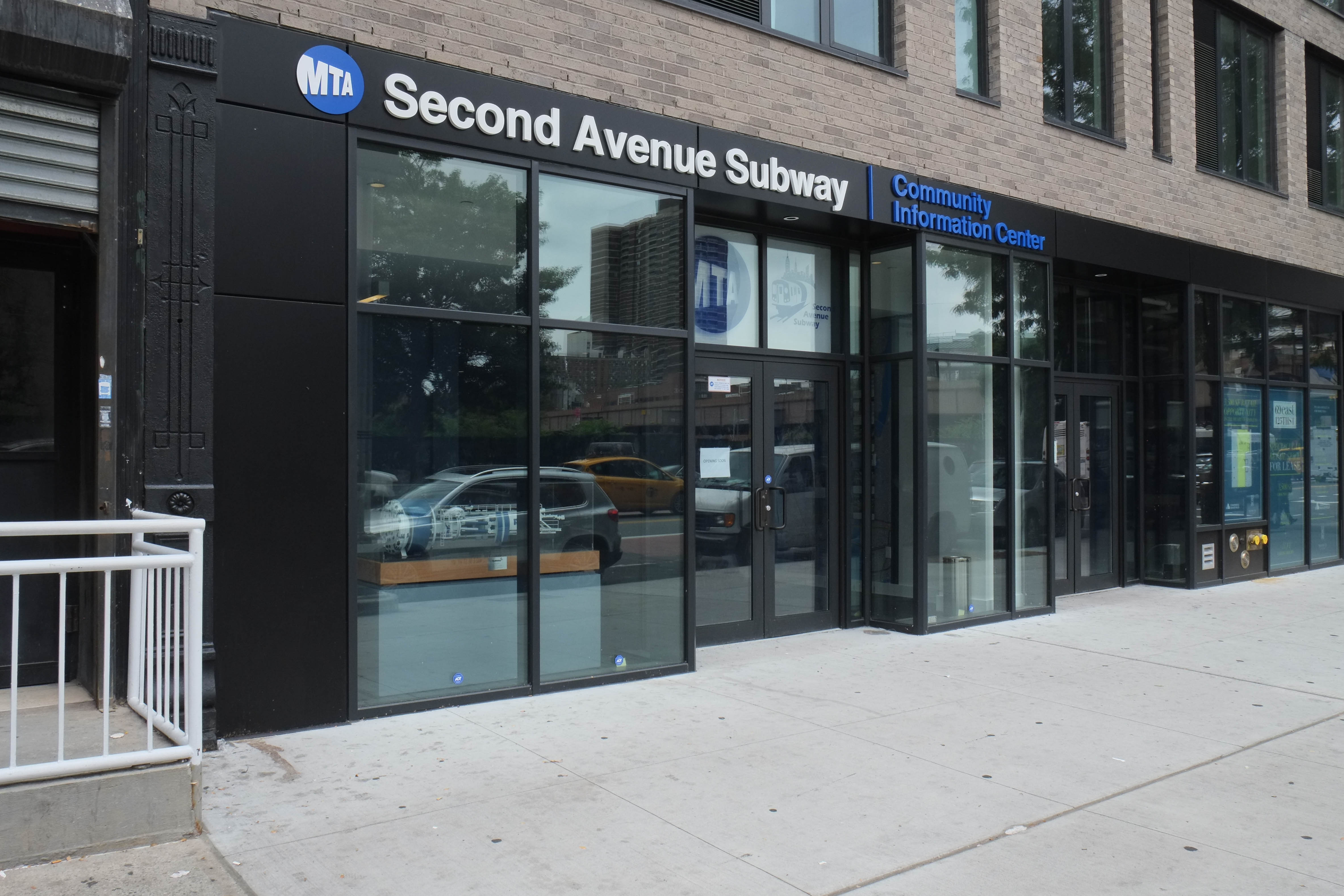
- The SAS Phase 2 Community Information Center

Station statistics
- Division: B (IND)
- Line: IND Second Avenue Line
- Services: Future
- Structure: Underground
- Platforms: 1 island platform (planned)
- Tracks: 2 (planned)

Station succession
- Next north: (Terminal)
- Next south: 116th Street: future
Station service legend
Symbol	Description
Stops all times	Stops in station at all times
Stops all times except late nights	Stops all times except late nights
Stops late nights only	Stops late nights only
Stops late nights and weekends	Stops late nights and weekends only
Stops weekdays during the day	Stops weekdays during the day
Stops weekends during the day	Stops weekends during the day
Stops all times except rush hours in the peak direction	Stops all times except rush hours in the peak direction
Stops all times except weekdays in the peak direction	Stops all times except weekdays in the peak direction
Stops daily except rush hours in the peak direction	Stops all times except nights and rush hours in the peak direction
Stops rush hours only	Stops rush hours only
Stops rush hours in the peak direction only	Stops rush hours in the peak direction only
Station closed	Station is closed
(Details about time periods)

Harlem–125th Street is the planned northern terminal for Phase 2 of the Second Avenue Subway. It would be built underneath 125th Street, below and perpendicular to the existing Lexington Avenue Line station. Phase 2 would stretch from 96th Street to 125th Street, with the next stations south being 116th Street and 106th Street. When opened, it will initially be served by the Q train, with the T providing service when Phase 3 of the line is built.

=== Introduction of the station to plans ===
A station at Lexington Avenue and 125th Street was not on the original Second Avenue Subway proposed as part of the New York City Transit Authority's 1968 Program for Action; instead, a Second Avenue Subway station would be built at 126th Street and Second Avenue. The line was to be built in two phases—the first phase from 126th to 34th Streets, the second phase from 34th to Whitehall Streets.

In March 2007, plans for the construction of the Second Avenue Subway were revived. The line's first phase, the "first major expansion" to the New York City Subway in more than a half-century, included three stations in total and cost $4.45 to $4.5 billion, spanning from 105th Street and Second Avenue to 63rd Street and Third Avenue. Phase 1 opened on January 1, 2017, with the line's northern terminal at 96th Street.

The second phase, between 125th and 96th Streets, was allocated $525 million in the MTA's 2015–2019 Capital Plan for planning, design, environmental studies, and utility relocation. This phase will complete the project's East Harlem section. The alignment will run under Second Avenue to 124th Street, before turning west on 125th Street. On October 18, 2016, the de Blasio administration announced a rezoning plan for East Harlem. One of the three Special Transit Land Use (TA) districts is for the area of the 125th Street station.

On November 21, 2016, the MTA requested that the Phase 2 project be entered into the Project Development phase under the Federal Transit Administration's New Starts program. On December 15, several elected officials for the area announced that they were seeking $6 billion of funding for Phase 2 of the line, including $2 billion from the federal government. These officials wished to secure funding from the presidential administration of Barack Obama before Obama's term ended on January 20, 2017. In their request for funding, they cited that they wanted to avoid an uncertain response from the first administration of Donald Trump and start construction on Phase 2 as soon as possible. The FTA granted this request in late December 2016. Under the approved plan, the MTA would complete an environmental reevaluation by 2018, receive funding by 2020, and open Phase 2 between 2027 and 2029. In January 2017, it was announced that Phases 2 and 3, which are expected to cost up to a combined $14.2 billion, were on the Trump administration's priority list of 50 most important transportation projects nationwide.

=== Current plans ===
In July 2018, the MTA released a supplemental environmental assessment for Phase 2 of the Second Avenue Subway. The updated report indicated that the 125th Street station would be relocated about 118 feet (36 m) west and 20 feet (6.1 m) below what had been proposed in the 2004 FEIS, to reduce impacts on nearby buildings. The proposed three-track station was reduced to two tracks. The modification would reduce flexibility, but would allow the section under 125th Street to be mined, rather than being constructed as cut-and-cover, thereby reducing impacts on nearby buildings. Simulations showed that a two-track layout could support the same level of service that the three-track layout could have provided: 28 trains per hour. To make up for the loss of the track, the tail tracks west of the station would be lengthened.

When built, this platform will be the northern terminal of the Second Avenue Subway. It will be five levels below street level, or two levels below the lower-level IRT Lexington Avenue Line platform. The station was originally proposed to have a three-track, two-island platform layout with a mezzanine above it and switches to the east of the platforms. The July 2018 plans call for two tracks and one island platform, with switches both to the west and the east. The tail tracks would extend to Lenox Avenue to allow for six trains to be stored, three per track. This would also provide a provision for a future expansion of the line along 125th Street.

Extra transfer capacity to the existing Lexington Avenue Line station would be provided as part of the construction of the Harlem–125th Street terminal. In its July 2018 supplemental report, the MTA indicated that it wanted to build new escalator entrances to the subway station complex on two of the corners at Lexington Avenue and 125th Street, replacing the existing entrances there. Entrance 1 would be located on the southeast corner, while entrance 2 would tentatively be located on the northwest corner, although this has yet to be confirmed. The original 2004 plans had called for entrance 2 to be located on the southwest corner, but the MTA stated that the location was comparatively small. The Second Avenue Subway station will include a new exit leading directly from the Second Avenue Line platform to the median of Park Avenue at the south side of 125th Street, allowing for a quick connection to the Metro-North Railroad's Harlem–125th Street station. In the 2018 report, the MTA stated that it also wanted to include a property on the intersection's southeast corner within the construction site. The ancillaries were also shifted from the locations proposed in the 2004 FEIS. Ancillary 1 and Ancillary 2, which were respectively supposed to be located at Third and Park Avenues on 125th Street, were both moved south to 124th Street. The ancillary buildings were also shifted west because the station cavern had been relocated west. Although local residents advocated for an additional entrance leading to an unused cavern under the elevated Metro-North station, the MTA ruled out this idea. The cavern contains the original routing of the Park Avenue main line, which was abandoned in 1897 when the current elevated station was completed.

=== Construction progress ===
The construction of the Second Avenue Subway was expected to improve quality of life around the existing subway station at Lexington Avenue, which was notorious for crime and drug use. In August 2025, the MTA board awarded a $1.97 billion contract to Connect Plus Partners, a joint venture between Halmar International and FCC Construction. The contract includes the construction of the 125th Street station shell, reconstruction of the existing tunnel near the 116th Street station, and new tunnels between Second Avenue–120th Street and Lenox Avenue–125th Street. Also in 2025, the MTA requested that the site of the Second Avenue Subway's 125th Street station be rezoned to allow the construction of 684 apartments above the station entrance.

==== Second Avenue Subway Community Information Center ====
A Second Avenue Subway Community Information Center for Phase 2, along 125th Street between Park and Madison Avenues, was originally planned to open in May 2017. The center's opening was delayed to September 18, 2017.

== Media ==
The station is mentioned by Lou Reed in his 1967 song "I'm Waiting for the Man", performed with The Velvet Underground, in which he describes traveling to Harlem to purchase heroin: "Up to Lexington / One-two-five / Feeling sick and dirty / More dead than alive."

== Gallery ==
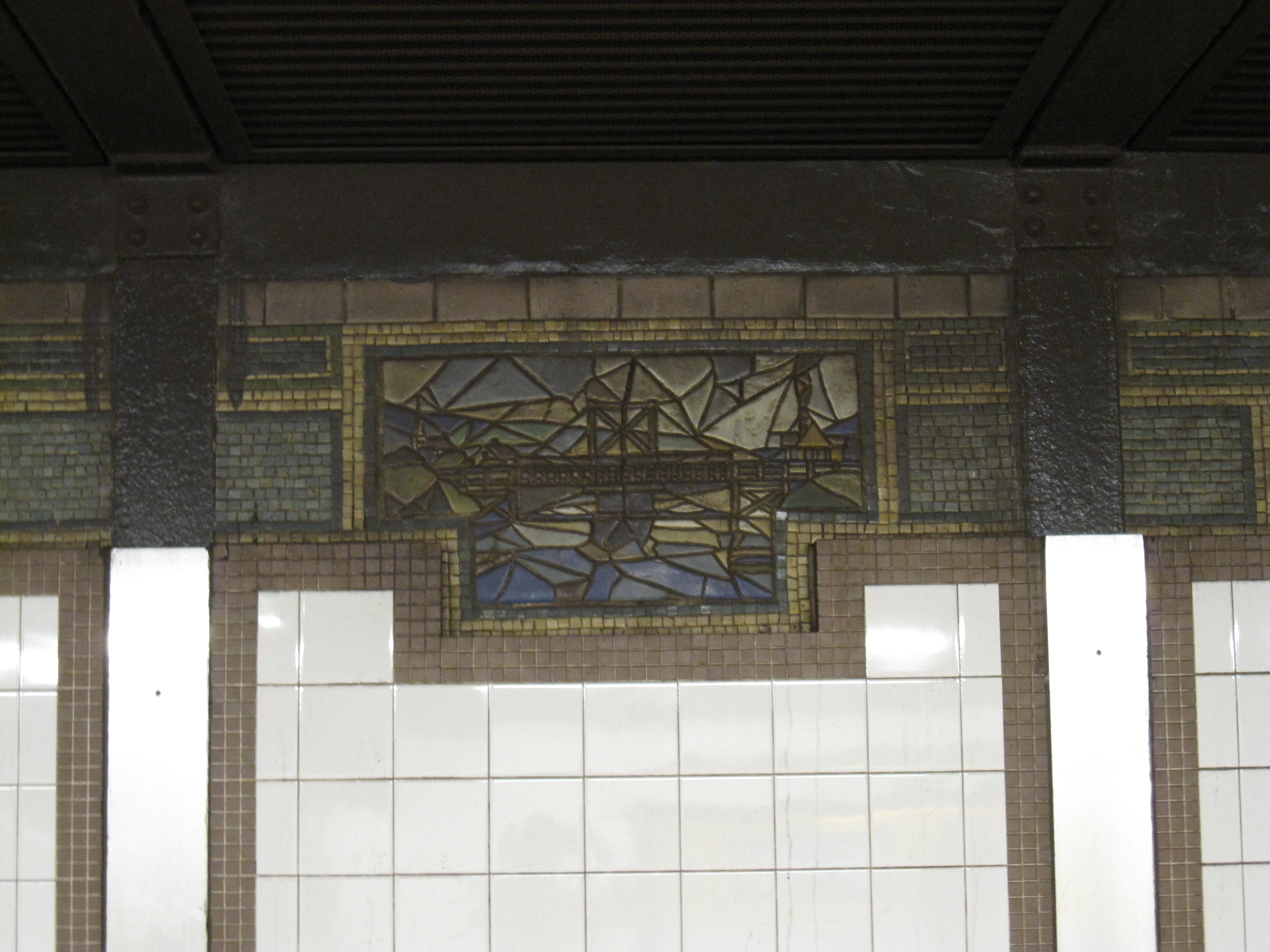
Mosaic with depiction of bridge

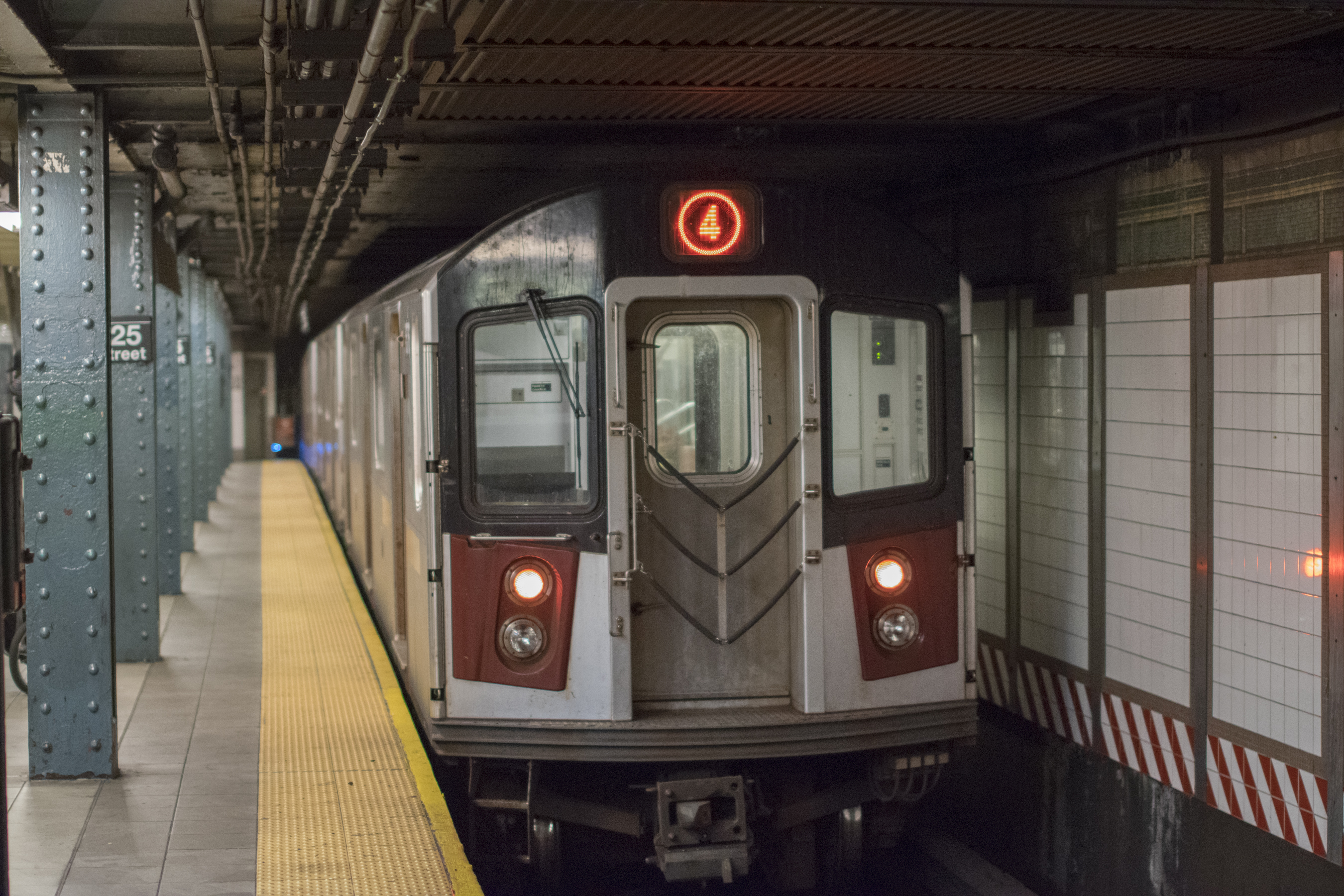
4 train leaving the station

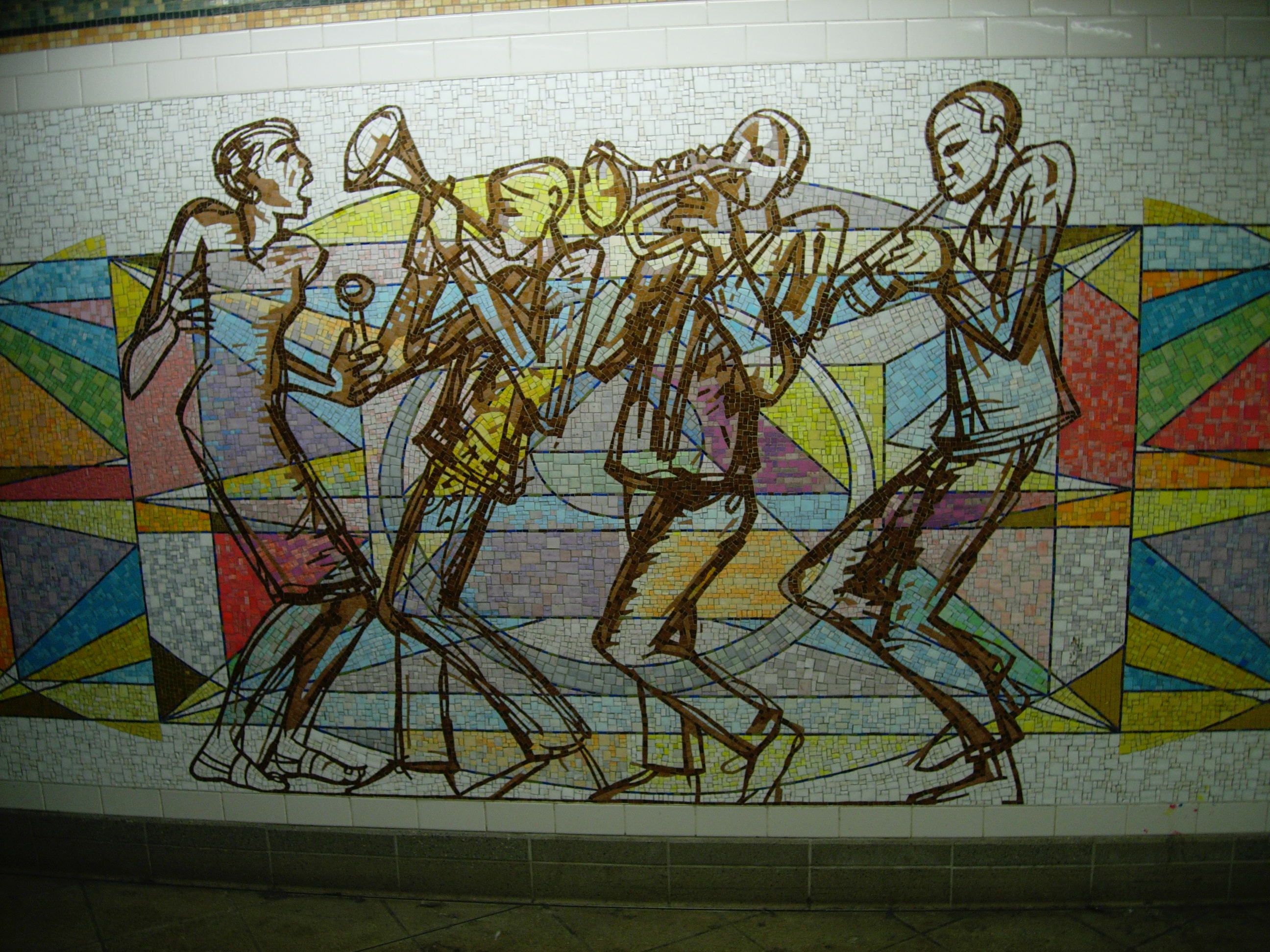
Polyrhythmics of Consciousness and Light mosaic

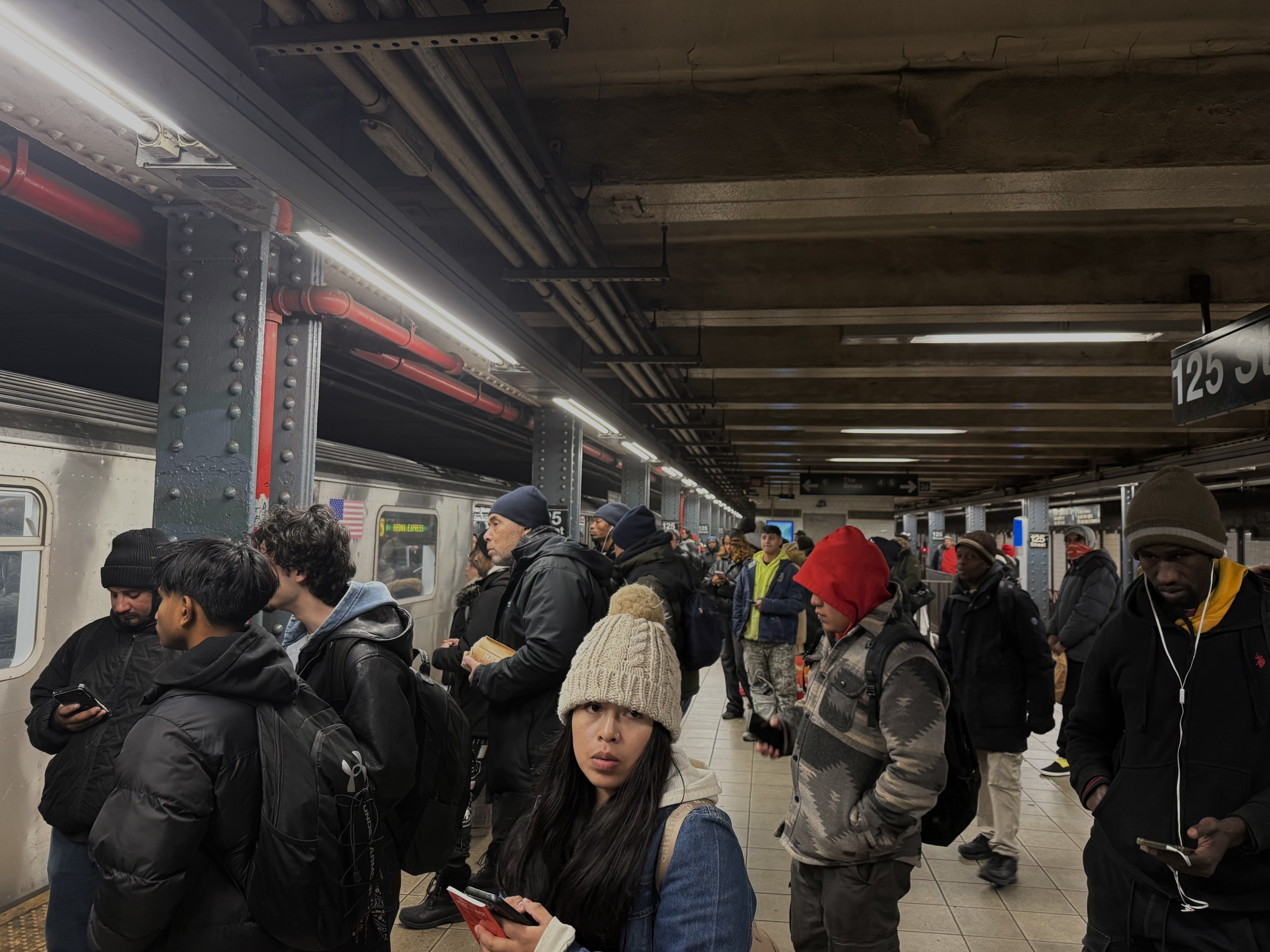
125th Street Delays. Note: Eastchester-Dyre Ave bound 5 express train is on the local track.

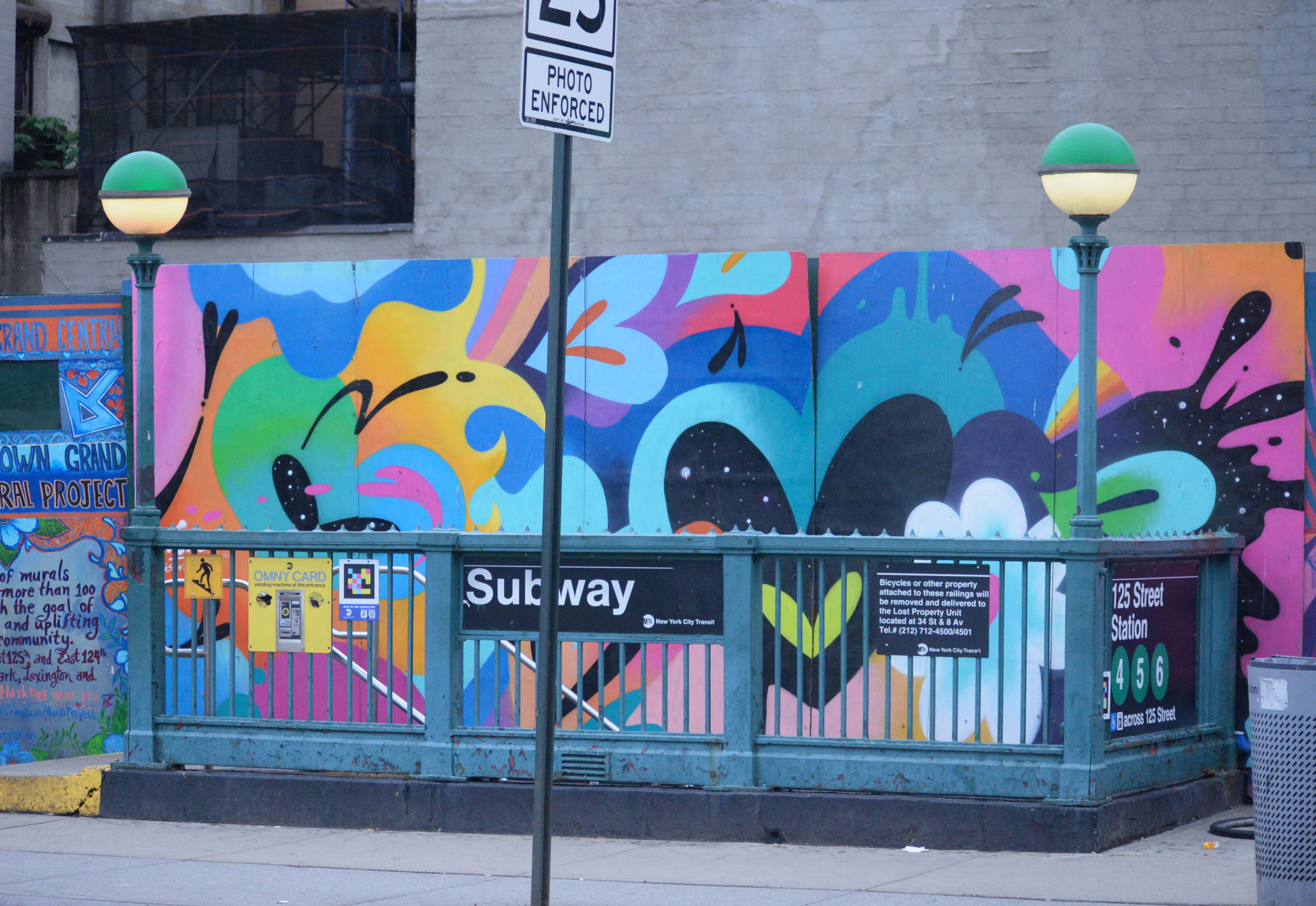
Stair entrance
