= 129th Street station =

Former Manhattan Railway elevated station (closed 1940)

129th St.

General information
- Location: 129th Street between Second and Third Avenues; New York, New York
- Coordinates: 40°48′21″N 73°55′59″W
- System: Former Manhattan Railway elevated station
- Operator: Interborough Rapid Transit Company; City of New York (after 1940)
- Lines: Second Avenue Line; Third Avenue Line; Willis Avenue Branch
- Platforms: 4 island platforms
- Tracks: 9

Construction
- Structure type: Elevated

History
- Opened: December 30, 1878; 147 years ago
- Closed: June 11, 1940; 86 years ago (2nd Ave.); July 1, 1950; 76 years ago (3rd Ave.)

Former services
Preceding station	Interborough Rapid Transit	Following station
133rd Street toward Bronx Park	Second Avenue Express	86th Street toward City Hall
133rd Street toward Bronx Park	Third Avenue Local-Express	106th Street toward City Hall
Terminus	Second Avenue Local	125th Street toward South Ferry
Terminus	Third Avenue Local	125th Street toward South Ferry
Terminus	Willis Avenue Shuttle	Willis Avenue Terminus
Location

The 129th Street station was a transfer station on the IRT Third Avenue Line in Manhattan, New York City, shared by elevated trains of both the Third Avenue Line and IRT Second Avenue Line. The next stop to the north was 133rd Street for the main line and Willis Avenue for the Willis Avenue spur, both of which were across a swing bridge above the Harlem River in the Bronx. The next stop to the south was 125th Street−Third Avenue for Third Avenue Line trains and 125th Street−Second Avenue for Second Avenue Line trains.

== Station layout ==
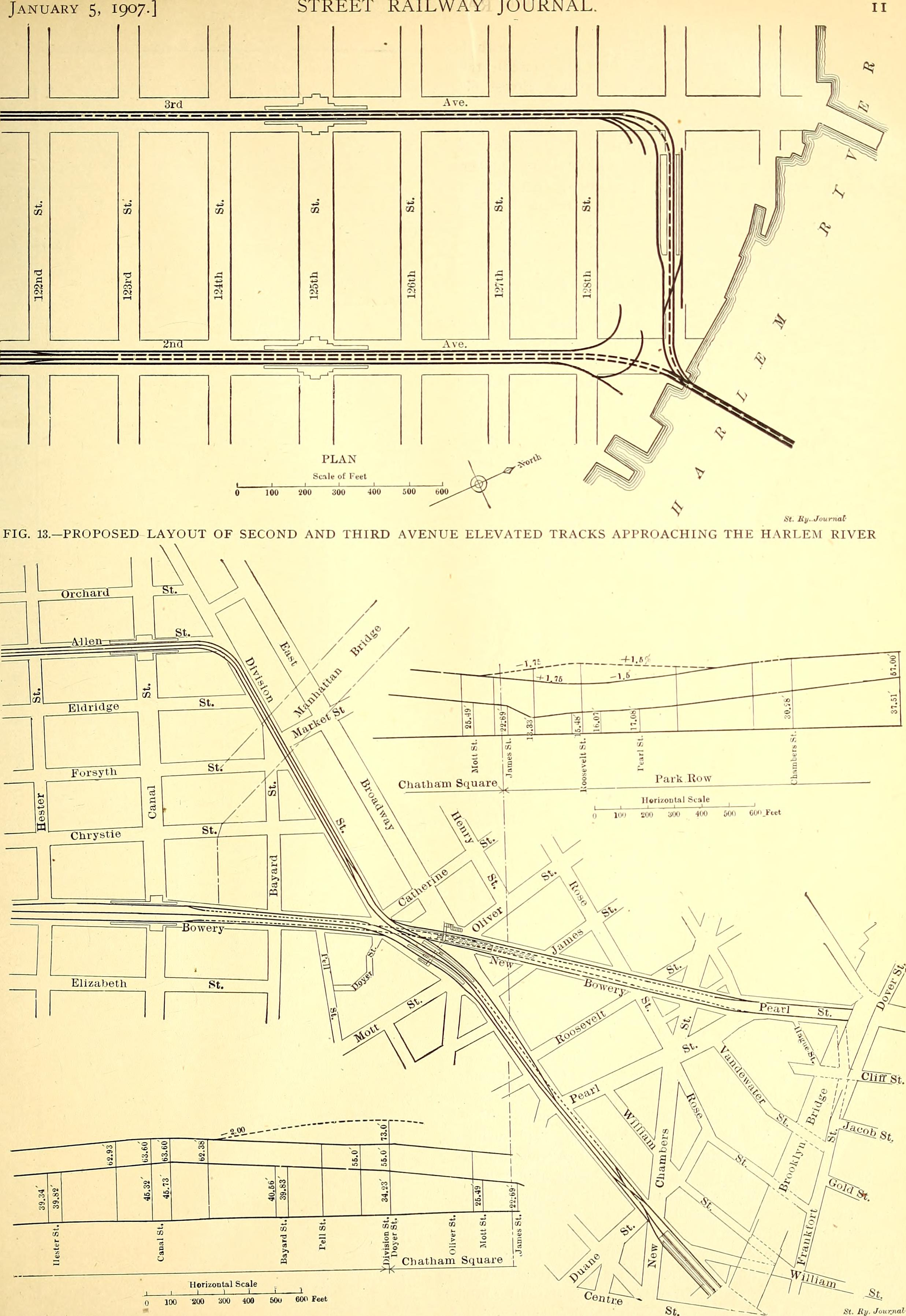
A diagram of the 129th Street station (top right) and the approaches to the Harlem River bridge, with the flyover express tracks shown in dotted lines.

The station was located between Second and Third Avenues, oriented west-to-east above and on the south side of 129th Street. The station was double-decked, with four island platforms for passengers and numerous tracks. The northernmost platform was used by shuttle service via the Willis Avenue Spur to Willis Avenue station, connecting to the New York, New Haven and Hartford Railroad. The next platform south was for through-service from the Third Avenue Line to and from the Bronx. The southern two island platforms were used for terminating trains, specifically those of the Second Avenue Line and some local Third Avenue trains. The Second Avenue Line fed into the southernmost platform, while the Third Avenue Line fed into both terminal platforms. All four platforms featured shelters. The platforms were connected by a covered bridge. A bi-directional flyover express track from the Third Avenue El bypassed the station. Adjacent to the south of the station was a storage yard, extending south to 128th Street. An additional side platform was located at the north end of the yard, used only by employees. North of the station, Third Avenue, Willis Avenue, and Second Avenue trains (the latter of which came from 125th Street and bypassed 129th Street) would use the bi-level swing bridge at the north end of Second Avenue, crossing the Harlem River towards the Bronx.

The exit to the station was located at Third Avenue and East 129th Street. The station also served as the terminal for numerous streetcar routes from the Bronx.

== History ==
The station originally opened on December 30, 1878, as part of the extension of the Third Avenue Line north of 67th Street. The station was originally a two-track island platform terminal located above Third Avenue. It served as the original terminal for the line, until it was extended across the Harlem River to the Bronx on May 17, 1886. On November 25, 1886, the station gained a connection to the Willis Avenue Spur which took commuters to a terminal station in the Bronx that served commuters using the New York, New Haven and Hartford Railroad and later to the New York, Westchester and Boston Railway interurban lines. This added a second platform oriented west-to-east for Willis Avenue trains, which was connected to the Third Avenue El platform.

The Willis Avenue shuttle ended service on December 18, 1887, but was restored on July 19, 1891. On August 1, 1891, the New Haven began running rapid transit cars from 129th via the Willis Spur and the New York and Harlem Railroad (today's Harlem Line). On August 15, 1898, a new and enlarged 129th Street station was opened between Second and Third Avenue. The 129th Street Yard was also opened at this time. Both the yard and station were constructed from 1886 to 1898. The original station was abandoned and eventually razed. Around 1907, the IRT planned to add a bi-directional express track to both the Second and Third Avenue lines, and build a new double-decked bridge with four tracks over the Harlem River. This was carried out during the Dual Contracts in the 1910s, adding 129th Street station's flyover express track. Express service began on January 17, 1916. All service via the Willis Avenue Spur ended on April 14, 1924, when a pedestrian bridge was opened between the Willis Avenue and 133rd Street stations.

The opening of the lines of the New York City Subway, particularly the IRT Lexington Avenue Line, in the early 20th century led to declining ridership on the elevated lines. The Els were also scapegoated for blight and urban ills in the surrounding neighborhoods. The 129th Street station in particular had low ridership, due to its proximity to the busy 125th Street station. It was also criticized for its uninspired design compared to the other stations on the lines. Following unification of the transit system under the city's Board of Transportation, the Second Avenue Line stopped serving the station on June 11, 1940, when it was closed north of 57th Street. With reduced service and low ridership, the 129th Street station was closed prematurely on July 1, 1950. Passengers were redirected to the 125th Street station, while express trains between Manhattan and the Bronx bypassed the station. The rest of the line south of 149th Street in the Bronx closed on May 12, 1955. The site became part of Harlem River Park.
