= 86th Street station (Second Avenue Subway) =

New York City Subway station in Manhattan

86 Street
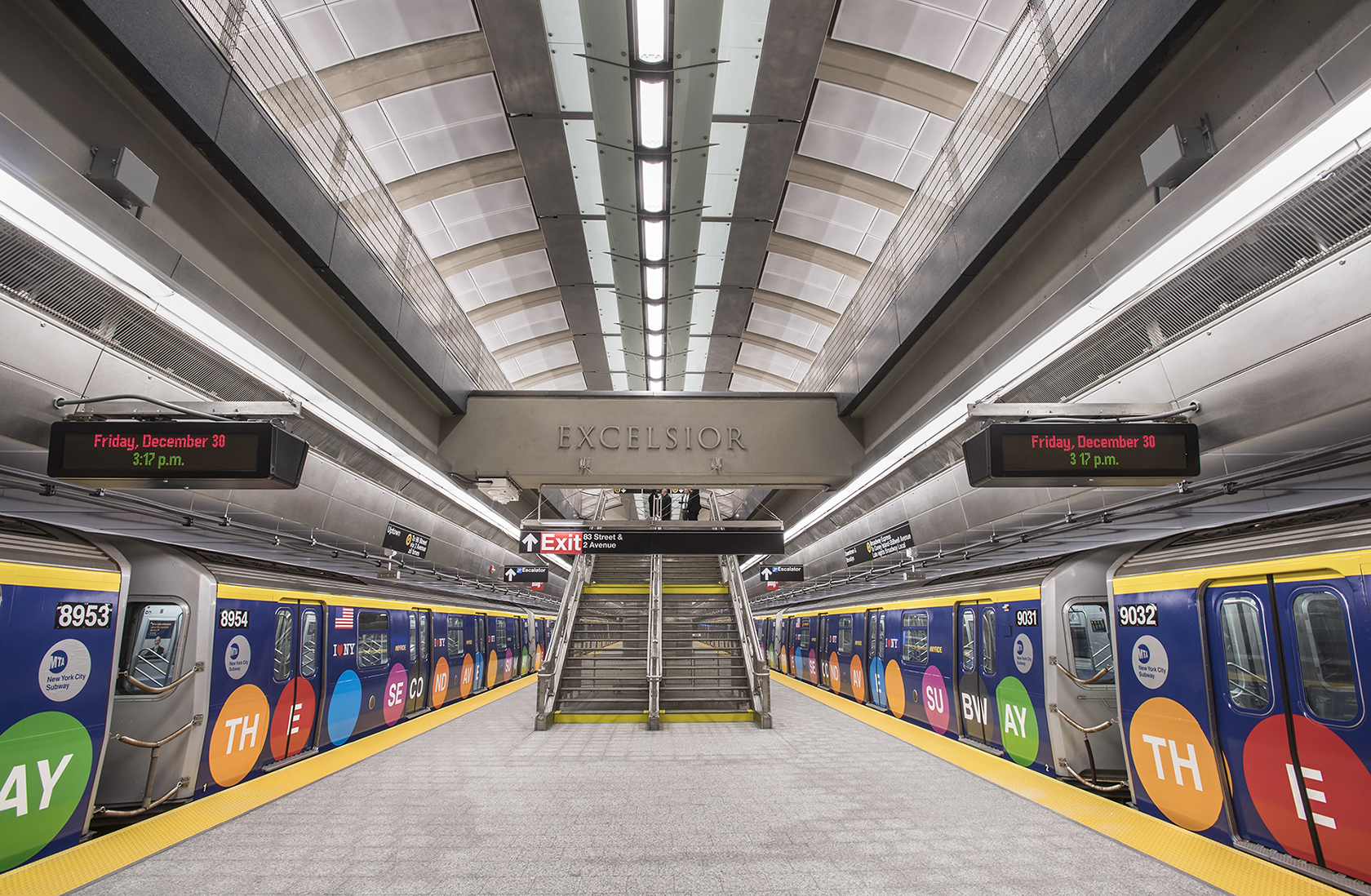
- Platform level, with two specially designed R160 Q trains. On the beam above the stairs is the word "Excelsior", the New York state motto, meaning "ever upward".

Station statistics
- Address: 86th Street & Second Avenue; New York, New York
- Borough: Manhattan
- Locale: Upper East Side, Yorkville
- Coordinates: 40°46′40.3″N 73°57′6.3″W
- Division: B (IND)
- Line: IND Second Avenue Line
- Services: N (limited rush hour service only); Q (all times); R (one weekday a.m. rush hour trip in the northbound direction only)
- Transit: NYCT Bus: M15, M15 SBS, M86 SBS; MTA Bus: BxM1, BxM6, BxM7, BxM8, BxM9, BxM10; NYC Ferry: Soundview route (at East 90th Street and East End Avenue)
- Structure: Underground
- Platforms: 1 island platform
- Tracks: 2

Other information
- Opened: January 1, 2017; 9 years ago
- Accessible: Yes

Traffic
- 2025: 6,391,777 ▲12.4%
- Rank: 39 out of 423
Services
Preceding station	New York City Subway	Following station
96th Street N Q R Terminus	Q (New York City Subway service)	72nd Street N Q toward Coney Island–Stillwell Avenue
Location
Location within New York City Subway
Location within New York City
Location within New York
Track layout
Street map
Station service legend
Symbol	Description
Stops all times	Stops all times
Stops rush hours only (limited service)	Stops rush hours only (limited service)
Stops rush hours in the peak direction only (limited service)	Stops rush hours in the peak direction only (limited service)
Stops weekends and weekday evenings	Stops weekends and weekday evenings

The 86th Street station is a station on the first phase of the Second Avenue Line of the New York City Subway. Located at the intersection of Second Avenue and 86th Street, in the Yorkville section of the Upper East Side in Manhattan, it opened on January 1, 2017. The station is served by the Q train at all times, as well as limited rush-hour N trains and one northbound A.M. rush hour R train. There are two tracks and an island platform.

The station was part of the original Second Avenue Subway as outlined in the Program for Action in 1968. Construction on that project started in 1972, but stalled in 1975 due to lack of funding. In 2007, a separate measure authorized a first phase of the Second Avenue Line to be built between 65th and 105th Streets, with stations at 72nd, 86th, and 96th Streets. The station opened on January 1, 2017, as an intermediate station along Phase 1. Since opening, the presence of the Second Avenue Subway's three Phase 1 stations has improved real estate prices along the corridor. The 86th Street station was used by approximately 8.4 million passengers in 2019.

The station, along with the other Phase 1 stations along the Second Avenue Subway, contains features not found in most New York City Subway stations. It is fully compliant with the Americans with Disabilities Act of 1990, containing two elevators for disabled access. Additionally, the station contains air conditioning and is waterproofed, a feature only found in newer stations. The artwork at 86th Street is Subway Portraits, a selection of twelve face portraits by painter Chuck Close.

== History ==
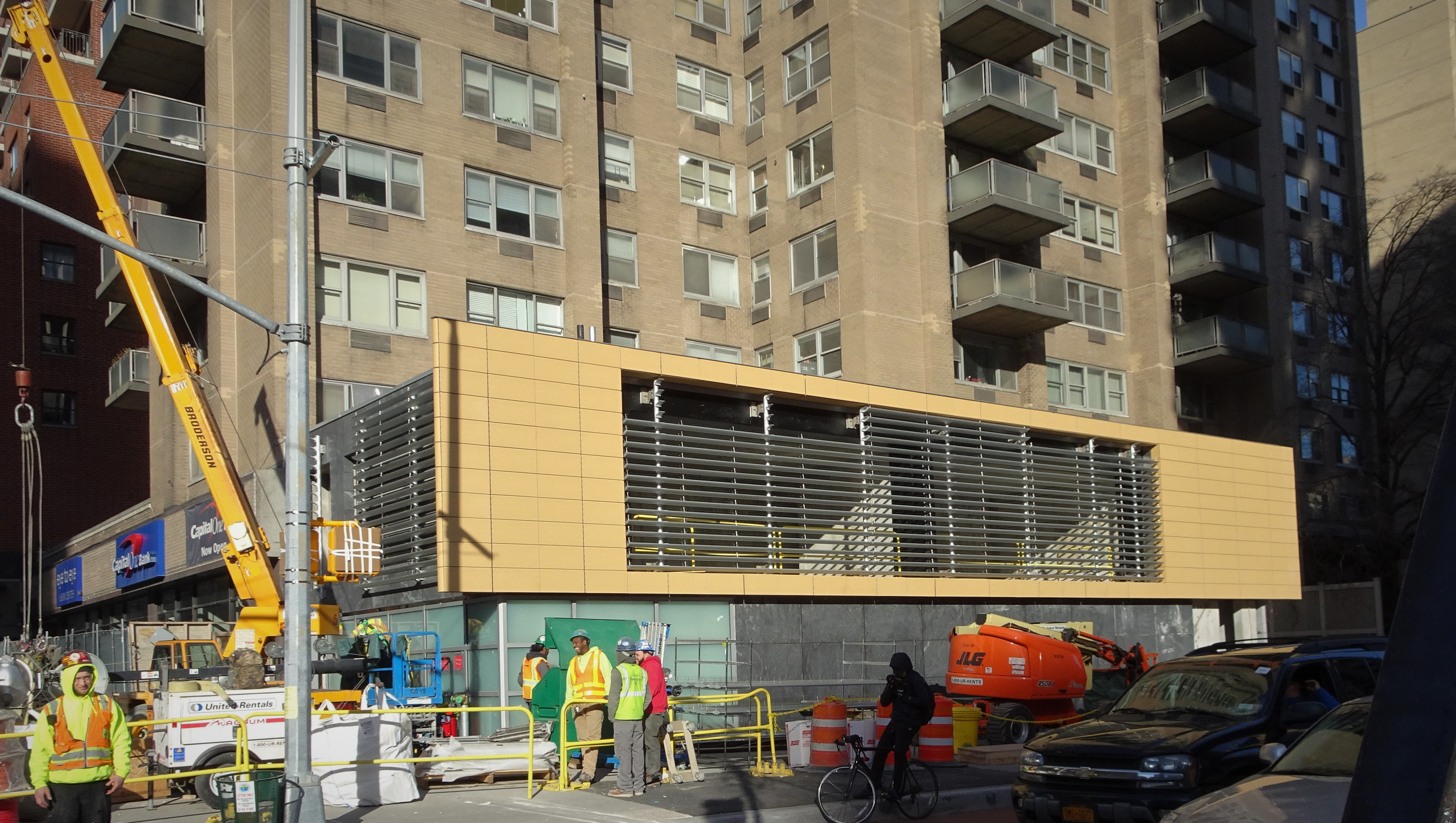
Ancillary building

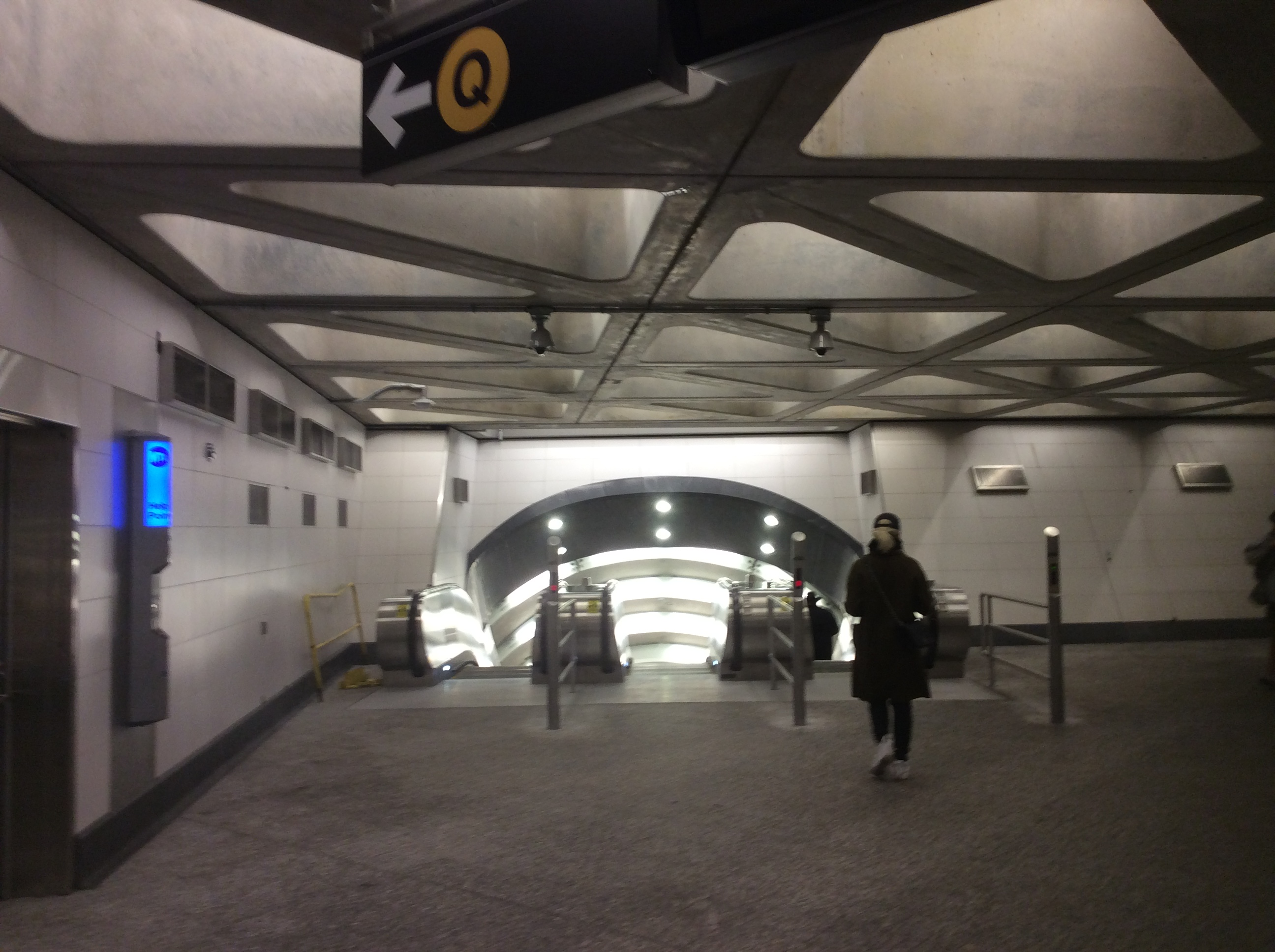
Vestibule for the two sets of escalator entrances at Entrance 2

=== Background ===
The Second Avenue Line was originally proposed in 1919 as part of a massive expansion of what would become the Independent Subway System (IND). Work on the line never commenced, as the Great Depression crushed the economy. Numerous plans for the Second Avenue Subway appeared throughout the 20th century, but these were usually deferred due to lack of funds. In anticipation of the never-built new subway line, the Second and Third Avenue elevated lines were demolished in 1942 and 1955, respectively. The Second Avenue Elevated had one station at 86th Street and Second Avenue—right above the same intersection where the subway station is located—while the Third Avenue Elevated had two stops on nearby Third Avenue at 84th Street and 89th Street.

=== Unrealized proposals ===
The Metropolitan Transportation Authority proposed a full-length Second Avenue Subway as part of its 1968 Program for Action. The line was to be built in two phases—the first phase from 126th to 34th Streets, the second phase from 34th to Whitehall Streets. The line's planned stops in Manhattan, spaced farther apart than those on existing subway lines, proved controversial; the Second Avenue line was criticized as a "rich man's express, circumventing the Lower East Side with its complexes of high-rise low- and middle-income housing and slums in favor of a silk stocking route." There was to be a station at 86th Street, but the next station north would be at 106th Street and the next station south would be at 57th Street. In a planning report, a possible 86th Street station had already been confirmed.

All Second Avenue Subway stations built under the Program for Action would have included escalators, high intensity lighting, improved audio systems, platform edge strips, and non-slip floors to accommodate the needs of the elderly and people with disabilities, but no elevators. Space at each station would have been used for ancillary facilities. The stations were to be made with brick walls and pavers alongside stainless steel, and would have relatively small dimensions, with 10-foot (3.0 m) mezzanine ceilings. Gruzen & Partners received a contract for the design of the 86th Street station.

A combination of Federal and State funding was obtained, and despite the controversy over the number of stops and route, a groundbreaking ceremony was held on October 27, 1972, at Second Avenue and 103rd Street. Although work on the 86th Street station never commenced, three short segments of tunnel in East Harlem and Chinatown were built. However, the city soon experienced its most dire fiscal crisis yet, due to the stagnant economy of the early 1970s, combined with the massive outflow of city residents to the suburbs, and in September 1975, construction on the line stopped, and the tunnels were sealed.

In 1999, the Regional Plan Association considered a full-length Second Avenue Subway, which include 86th Street as one of its planned 31 stations. The main station entrance would be at 86th Street to the north, with additional exits between 86th and 82nd Streets to the south.

=== Construction ===
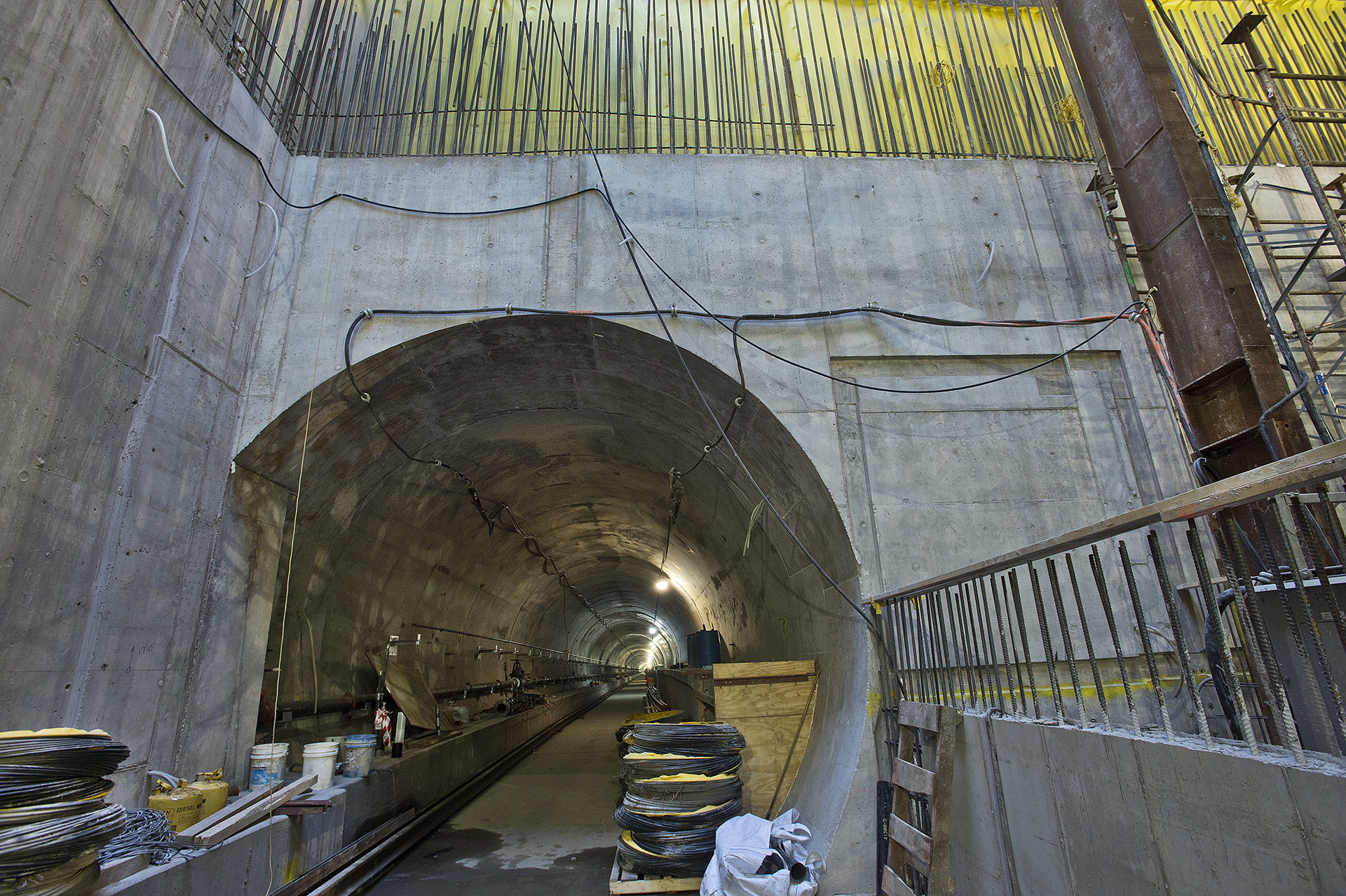
Tunnel portal at edge of station cavern

In March 2007, plans for the construction of the Second Avenue Subway were revived. The line's first phase, the "first major expansion" to the New York City Subway in more than a half-century, included three stations in total (at 72nd, 86th, and 96th Streets), which collectively cost $4.45 to $4.5 billion. Its construction site was designated as being from 105th Street and Second Avenue to 63rd Street and Third Avenue. The MTA awarded a $337 million contract—one that included constructing the tunnels between 92nd and 63rd Streets, building a launch box for the tunnel boring machine (TBM) at 92nd to 95th Streets, and erecting access shafts at 69th and 72nd Streets—to Schiavone Construction, Skanska USA Civil, and J.F. Shea Construction. The line's construction commenced on April 15, 2007, though planning for the station was finalized in June 2007, when the station entrances' locations were confirmed.

On September 15, 2011, the contract for building the station was awarded to the joint venture of Skanska USA and Traylor Bros Inc. As of January 17, 2013, the cavern stretching from 83rd to 87th Streets was 57% excavated. By July 2013, construction of the station was 53% complete. The final blast for the 86th Street station was completed for an escalator cavern on November 22, 2013. Skanska/Traylor were still installing waterproofing and steel reinforcement, as well as putting concrete around the cavern, entrances, and ancillaries. As of May 2014, entrances 1 and 2 were being built, and excavation was 100% complete; as of December 2014, the station shell was complete, bringing the total Second Avenue Subway project progress to three-fourths completion.

The station was scheduled to be completed by May 16, 2016, but the estimated completion date was pushed back to October 2016. In October 2016, concerns arose that the station might not open on time because workers had only installed 10 of the station's 13 escalators. However, the 86th Street station passed all required systems testing by December 18, 2016. The station opened on January 1, 2017.

== Station layout ==
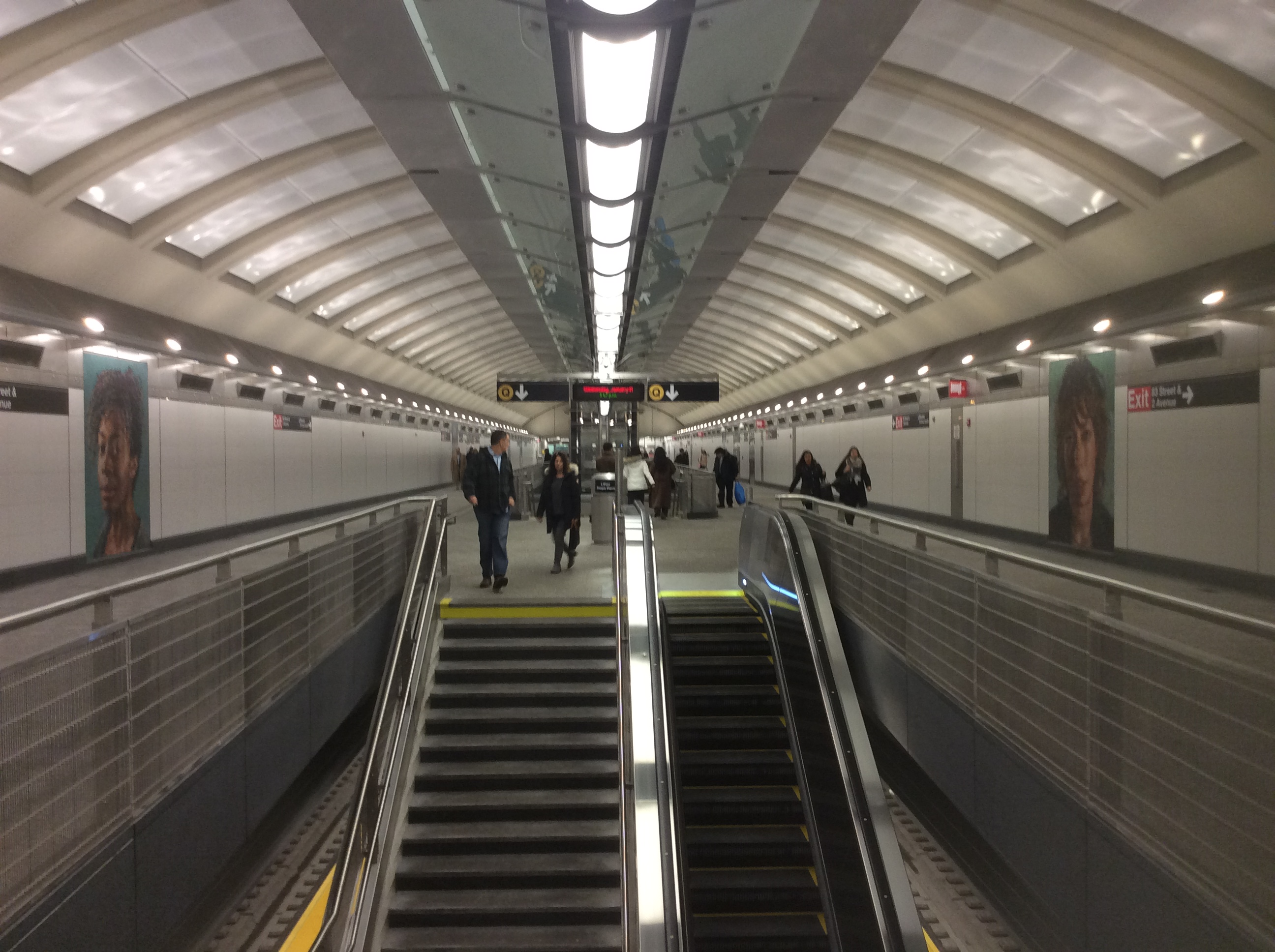
Mezzanine

The 86th Street station is served by Q trains at all times, some N trains during rush hours, and one northbound R train during the AM rush hours. The station is between 96th Street to the north and 72nd Street to the south. It has two tracks and an island platform. The station is built so that it is more wide open than most other underground stations in the system; its architecture, along with two other Second Avenue Subway stations, was compared to a Washington Metro station by Michael Horodniceanu, President of MTA Capital Construction. The deep-level platform is 93 feet (28 m) below ground. The platform for the 86th Street station, like the other Second Avenue Subway stations, is 27.8 feet (8.5 m) wide. As with other stations on the first phase of the Second Avenue Subway, it was designed and engineered by a joint venture of Arup and AECOM.

The station has air-cooling systems to make it at least 10 °F (6 °C) cooler than other subway stations during the summer. This requires the station to have large ventilation and ancillary buildings, rather than traditional subway grates. The station is also compliant with current fire codes, whereas most existing stations are not. Additionally, the station is waterproofed with concrete liners and fully drained. In early plans, the Second Avenue Subway was supposed to have platform screen doors to assist with air-cooling, energy savings, ventilation, and track safety, but this plan was scrapped in 2012 as cost-prohibitive. According to an internal study prepared for the MTA in 2020, the 86th Street station could theoretically accommodate half-height platform edge doors. Full-height platform screen doors would be possible but would necessitate the installation of structural bracing and relocation of several mechanical systems.

=== Artwork ===
In 2009, MTA Arts & Design selected Chuck Close from a pool of 300 potential artists to create the artwork for the station. His work consists of a series of twelve portraits of the city's cultural figures, spread over 1,000 square feet (93 m^{2}) of wall. Each 10-foot-high (3.0 m) piece is made with tiles that are painted to create a mosaic-like effect. The pieces cost $1 million and were installed near the exits and in the mezzanines.

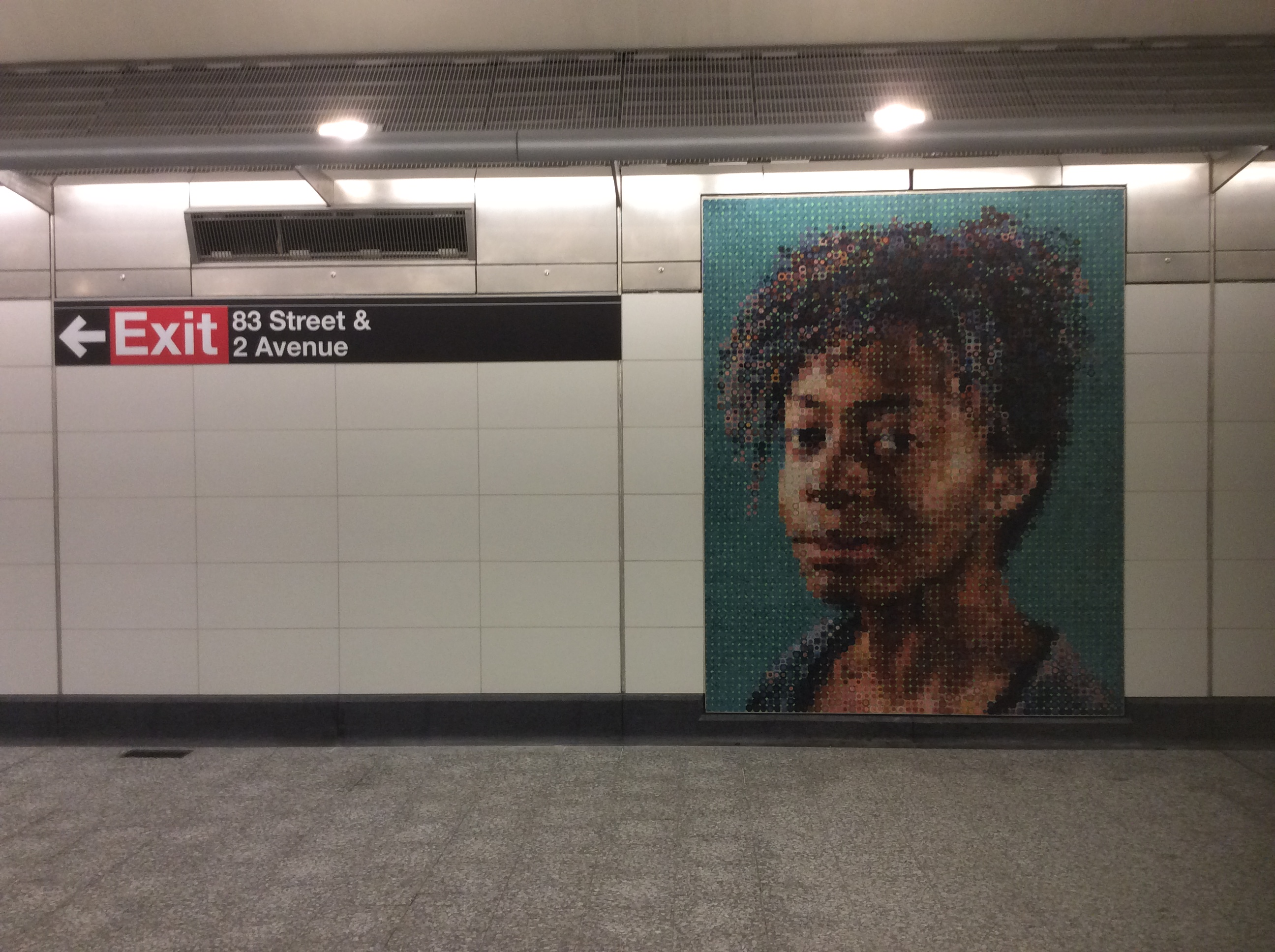
Subway Portraits: Kara Walker

Close's portraits at the station, titled Subway Portraits, fall into two main categories. The first category of portraits comprises artists whom Close is familiar with. The station contains portraits of composer Philip Glass in his youth; musician Lou Reed; photographer Cindy Sherman; painter Cecily Brown; artist Kara Walker; and painter Alex Katz. The second category is composed of portraits of younger, more ethnically diverse artists including Zhang Huan, Sienna Shields and Pozsi B. Kolor. In these portraits, Close aimed to highlight the cultural diversity of New York City. He also has two self-portraits within the station.

=== Exits and ancillary buildings ===
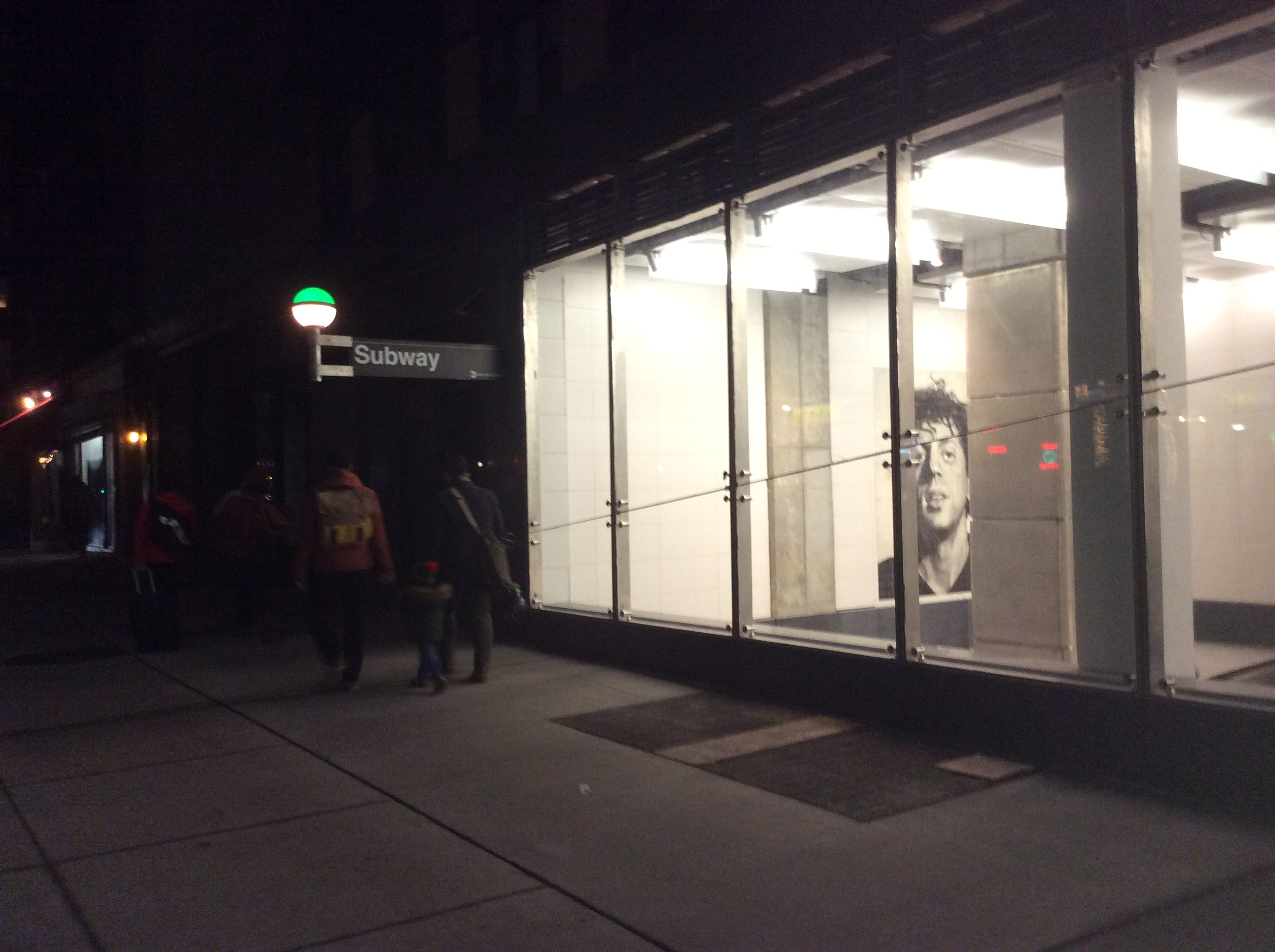
Entrance 1 in building near 83rd Street

There are 3 entrances and exits, which comprise 10 escalators and one elevator.

Exit location	Exit Type	Number of exits
Entrance 1 Within building at NE corner of Second Avenue and 83rd Street	Escalator	2 escalators
Entrance 2 (2 entry points); NE corner of Second Avenue and 86th Street	Escalator	Each entry point has 2 escalators
Entrance 2 SE corner of Second Avenue and 86th Street	Elevator	1

There are also two ancillary buildings that store station equipment:

- Ancillary 1, NW corner of Second Avenue and 83rd Street
- Ancillary 2, NW corner of Second Avenue and 86th Street

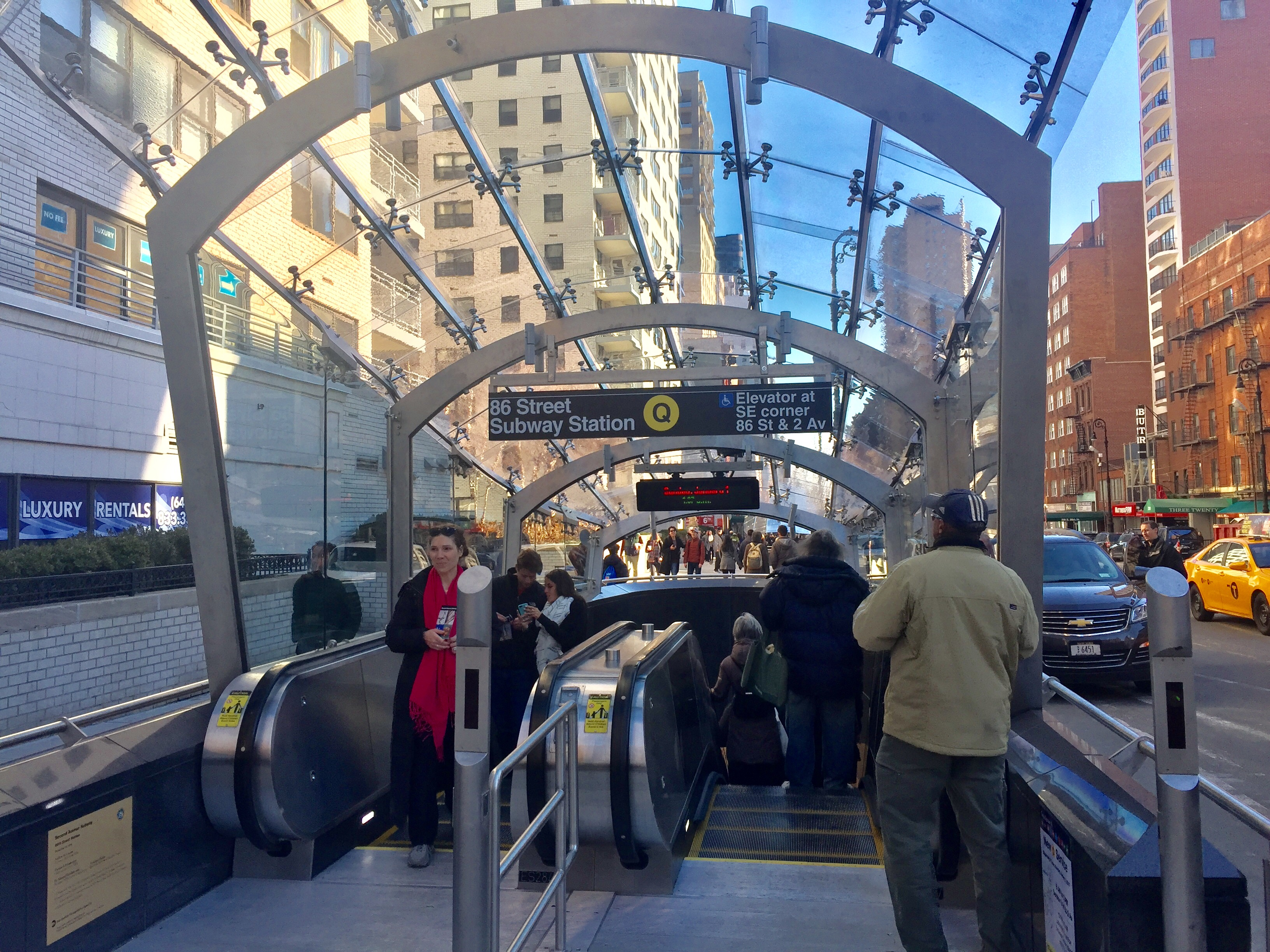
Entrance 2

Originally, Entrance 2's escalator entrance was to be located inside the Yorkshire Towers apartment building at 305 East 86th Street, on the northeast corner of Second Avenue and 86th Street. In 2009, a Finding Of No Significant Impact by the Federal Transit Administration (FTA) found this to be unfeasible, so the Metropolitan Transportation Authority (MTA) revised the plan to two separate sidewalk entrances in front of the building. During the planning process, it was determined that building a new entrance within the Yorkshire Towers would be too expensive and logistically unfeasible. The apartments directly above the entrance's location would have had to be structurally underpinned during construction, and the Food Emporium supermarket location would have had to close to make way for the new entrance. Of the three alternatives presented for moving the entrance, the MTA chose an alternative in which there would be two new escalator entrances on the north side of 86th Street, both flanking the semicircular driveway of Yorkshire Towers and facing away from the driveway. There was also a proposal to move the sidewalk escalator entrances to the south side of the street, as well as another proposal to build a new structure containing five elevators at the southeast corner of Second Avenue and 86th Street, in a manner similar to Entrance 3 of the adjacent 72nd Street station.

Controversy emerged over Entrance 2's location in February 2011, when a lawsuit was filed by the Yorkshire Towers over the location of Entrance 2. The entrances, planned to service 3,600 people an hour, were alleged in the lawsuit to be destroying the quality of life for building tenants, if the entrances were to be built in the location. The lawsuit was later dismissed because the suit had been filed two years after the FTA's FONSI was published, which was past the statute of limitations. A new lawsuit was filed on March 15, 2013, after the MTA started construction on the entrances. In June 2013, that lawsuit was also dismissed.

In May 2017, all three escalators in Entrance 1 were damaged by sprinklers activated by faulty sensors, causing the entire entrance to be temporarily closed.

== Effects ==
Since 2013, construction of the station has caused the value of real estate in the area to rise. Although the surrounding area's real estate prices had been declining since the 1990s, there had been increases in the purchases and leases of residential units around the area, causing real estate prices to rise again. Some businesses near the station's construction site had also lost profits. With the opening of the new station, business owners hoped to see an increase in patronage.

== Second Avenue Subway Community Information Center ==
The Second Avenue Subway Community Information Center, which gave information about Phase I construction to community members, was located nearby, at 1628 Second Avenue between 84th and 85th Streets. It opened on July 25, 2013. On May 23, 2014, a new exhibit about the construction techniques used to build the Second Avenue Subway, titled En Route: The Techniques and Technologies Used to Build the Second Avenue Subway, was launched at the center. Throughout the process of construction, the MTA also gave intermittent tours of the construction site to Upper East Side residents with reservations. The center received over 20,000 visitors in three years. In 2017, the MTA opened a similar center outside the 125th Street station in East Harlem for Phase II.

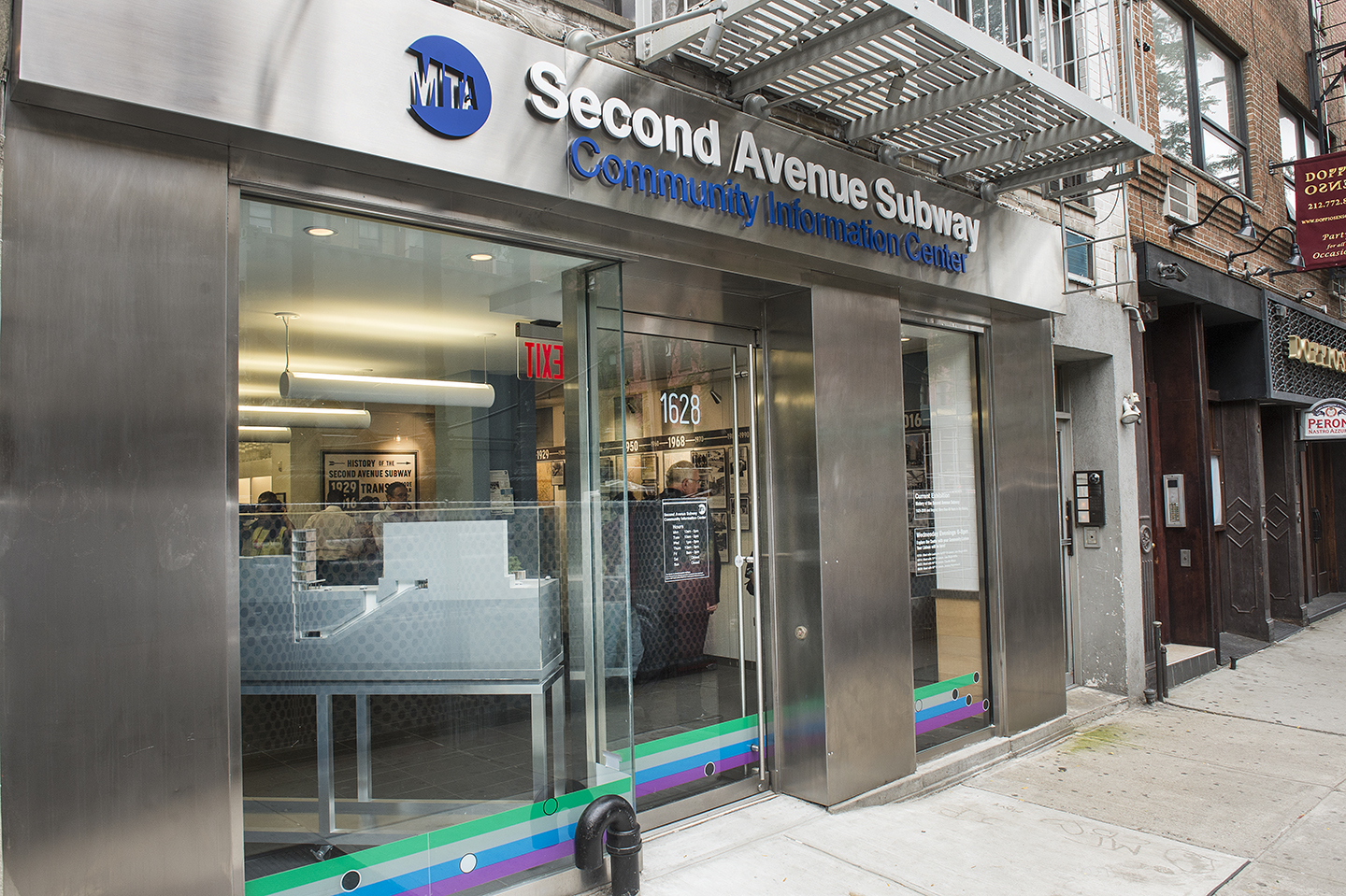
Facade of Second Avenue Subway Community Information Center

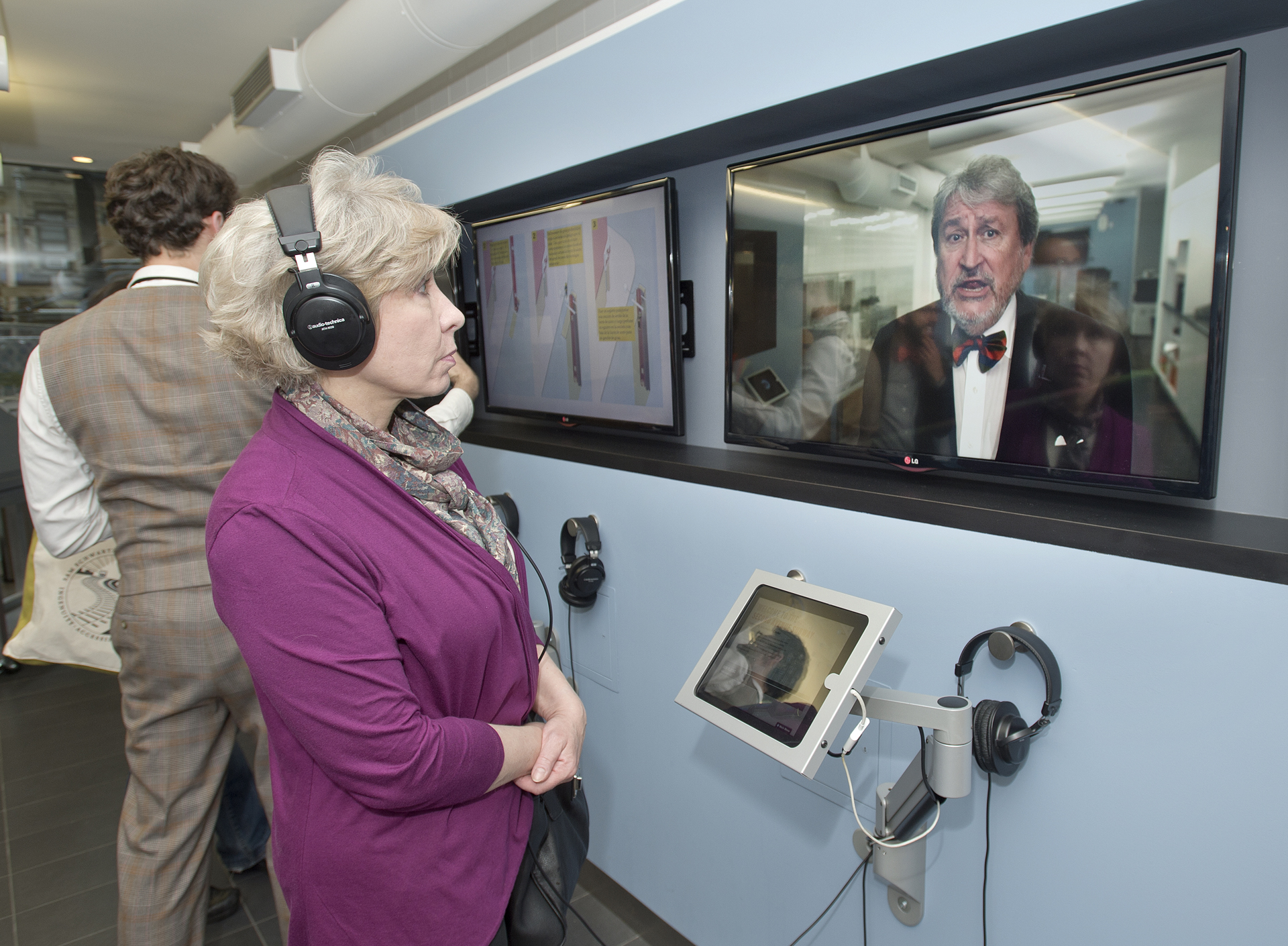
Video exhibit

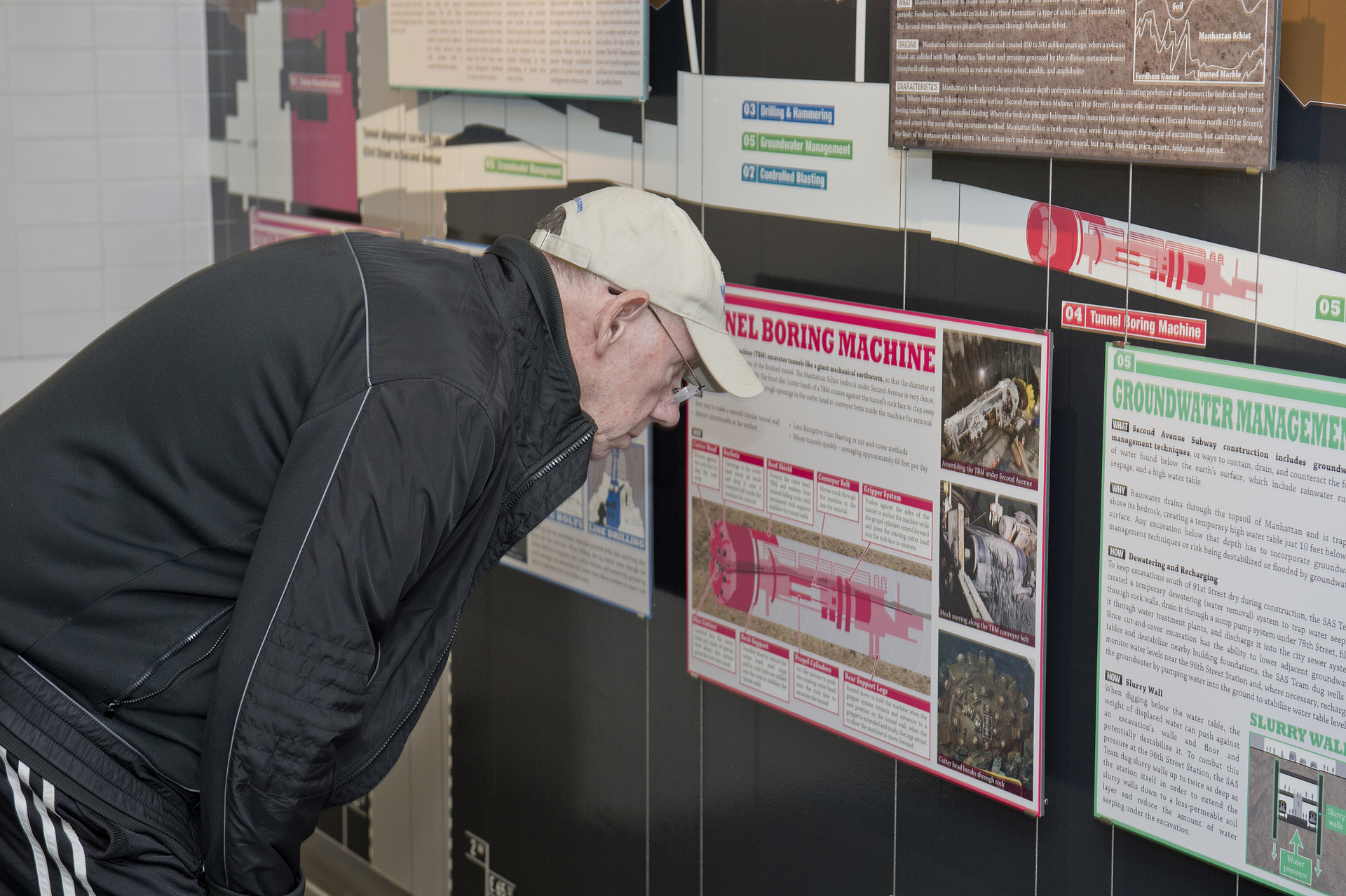
Sign exhibit

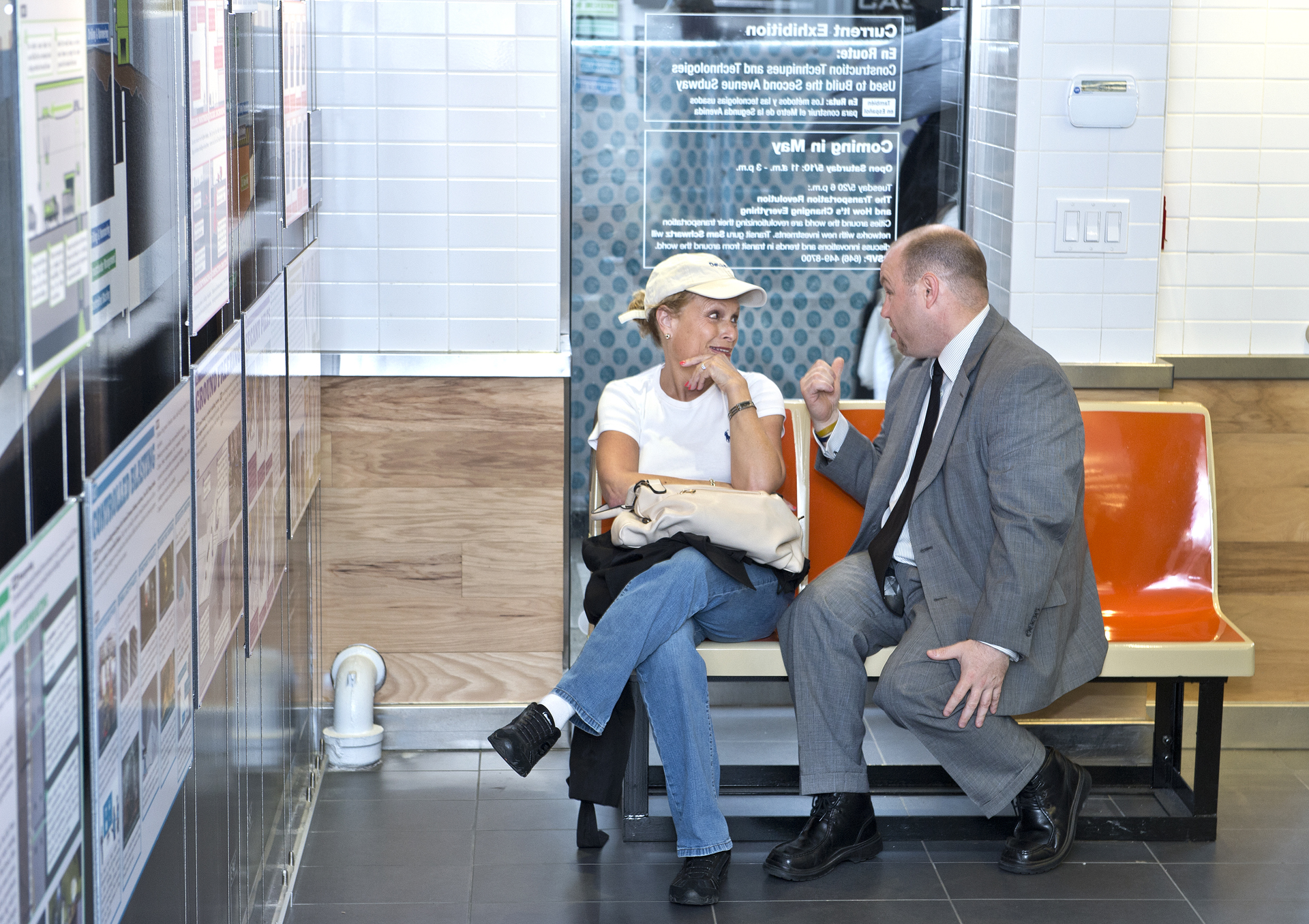
Subway car exhibit

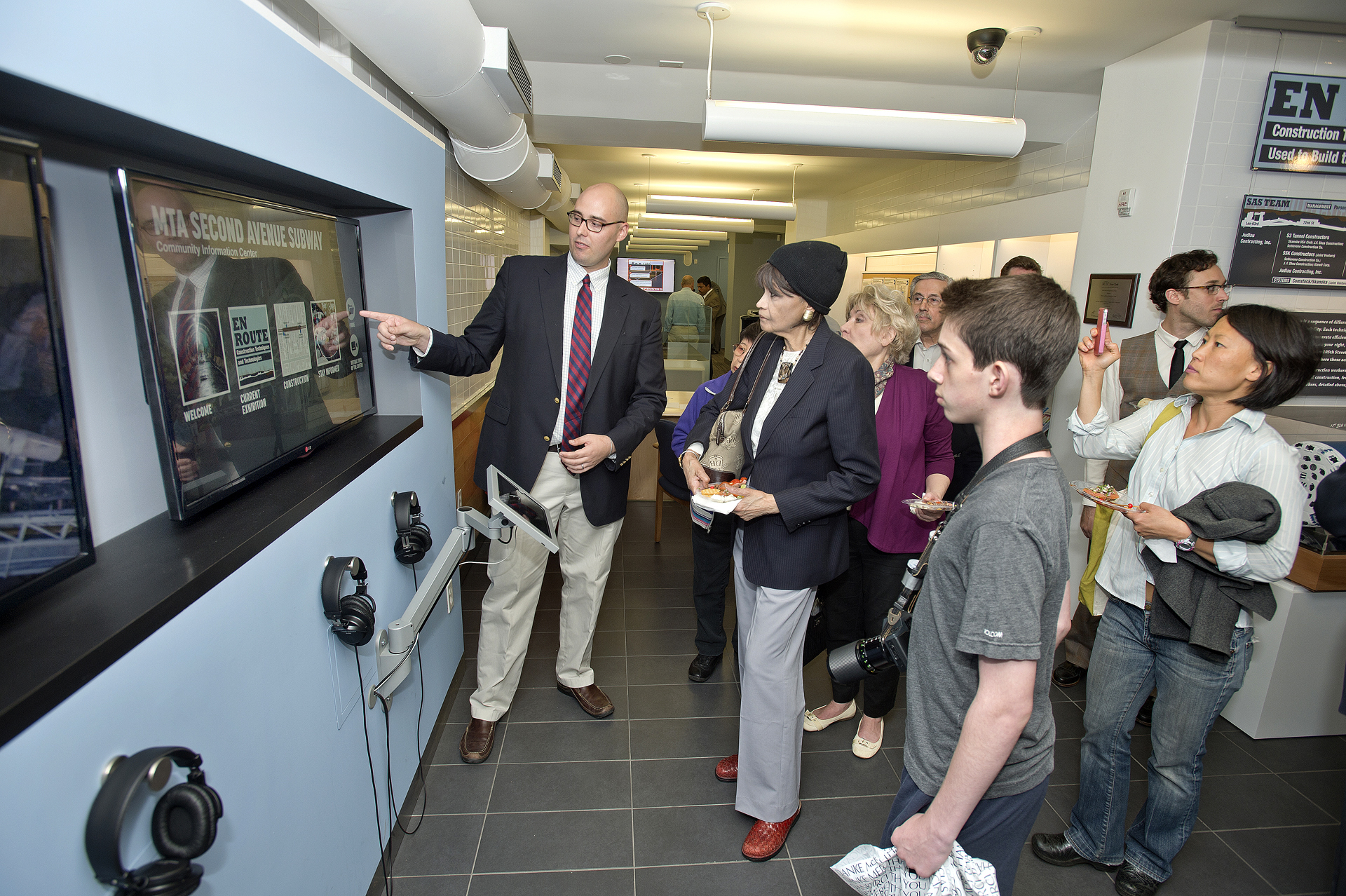
Video exhibit

== Nearby places ==
- Carl Schurz Park and Gracie Mansion
- Doyle New York
- The Jeffersons Apartment building at 3Rd Avenue and East 85th Street
- Municipal Asphalt Plant
