= 72nd Street station (Second Avenue Subway) =

New York City Subway station in Manhattan

72 Street
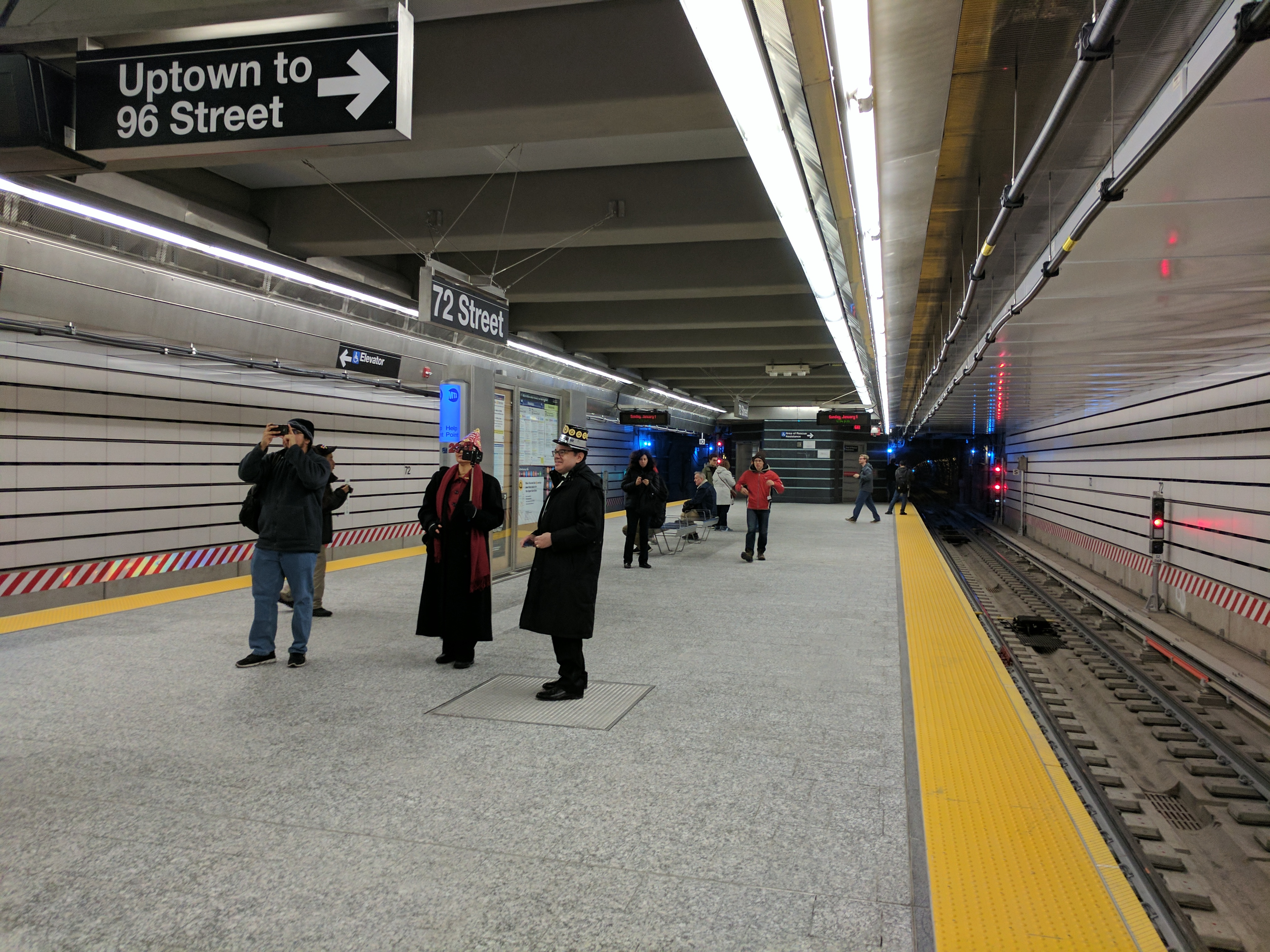

Station statistics
- Address: 72nd Street & Second Avenue; New York City, New York, US
- Borough: Manhattan
- Locale: Lenox Hill
- Coordinates: 40°46′8″N 73°57′30″W
- Division: B (IND)
- Line: IND Second Avenue Line
- Services: N (limited rush hour service only); Q (all times); R (one weekday a.m. rush hour trip in the northbound direction only)
- Transit: NYCT Bus: M15, M15 SBS, M66, M72
- Structure: Underground
- Platforms: 1 island platform
- Tracks: 2

Other information
- Opened: January 1, 2017; 9 years ago
- Accessible: Yes

Traffic
- 2025: 7,583,622 ▲9.1%
- Rank: 28 out of 423
Services
| Preceding station | New York City Subway | Following station |
|---|---|---|
| 86th Street N Q R toward 96th Street | Q (New York City Subway service) | Lexington Avenue–63rd Street N Q toward Coney Island–Stillwell Avenue |
Location
Location within New York City Subway
Location within New York City
Location within New York
Track layout
Street map
Station service legend
| Symbol | Description |
| Stops all times | Stops all times |
| Stops rush hours only (limited service) | Stops rush hours only (limited service) |
| Stops rush hours in the peak direction only (limited service) | Stops rush hours in the peak direction only (limited service) |
| Stops weekends and weekday evenings | Stops weekends and weekday evenings |

The 72nd Street station is a station on the first phase of the Second Avenue Line of the New York City Subway. Located at the intersection of Second Avenue and 72nd Street, in the Lenox Hill section of the Upper East Side in Manhattan, it opened on January 1, 2017. The station is served by the Q train at all times, as well as limited rush-hour N trains and one northbound A.M. rush hour R train.

72nd Street has two tracks and one island platform; when planning for the line started in the early 2000s, the station was originally proposed with 3 tracks and 2 island platforms, but this was cut back due to the line's rising costs. This is the southernmost station on the first phase of the Second Avenue Line; south of this station, the BMT 63rd Street Line diverges to the west, towards the Lexington Avenue–63rd Street station, and bellmouths exist for a future extension to Second Avenue–Houston Street and Hanover Square.

The station was not originally proposed as part of the Program for Action in 1968, but a later revision to that plan entailed building a Second Avenue Subway with one of its stops located at 72nd Street. Construction on that project started in 1972, but stalled in 1975 due to lack of funding. In 2007, a separate measure authorized a first phase of the Second Avenue Line to be built between 65th and 105th Streets, with stations at 72nd, 86th, and 96th Streets. The station opened on January 1, 2017, with provisions to extend the line south to Houston Street in Phase 3. Since opening, the presence of the Second Avenue Subway's three Phase 1 stations has improved real estate prices along the corridor. The 72nd Street station was used by approximately 9.5 million passengers in 2019.

The station, along with the other Phase 1 stations along the Second Avenue Subway, contains features not found in most New York City Subway stations. It is fully compliant with the Americans with Disabilities Act of 1990, containing six elevators for disabled access. Additionally, the station contains air conditioning and is waterproofed, a feature only found in newer stations. The artwork at 72nd Street is Perfect Strangers, a set of portrait mosaics by artist and photographer Vik Muniz.

== History ==
=== Background ===
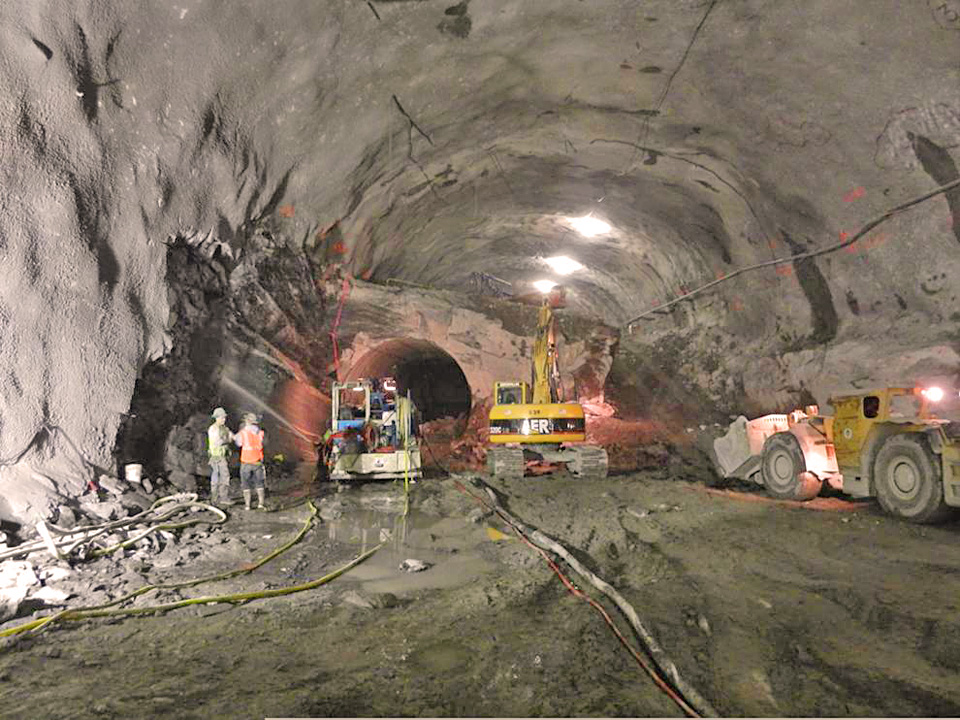
Early progress

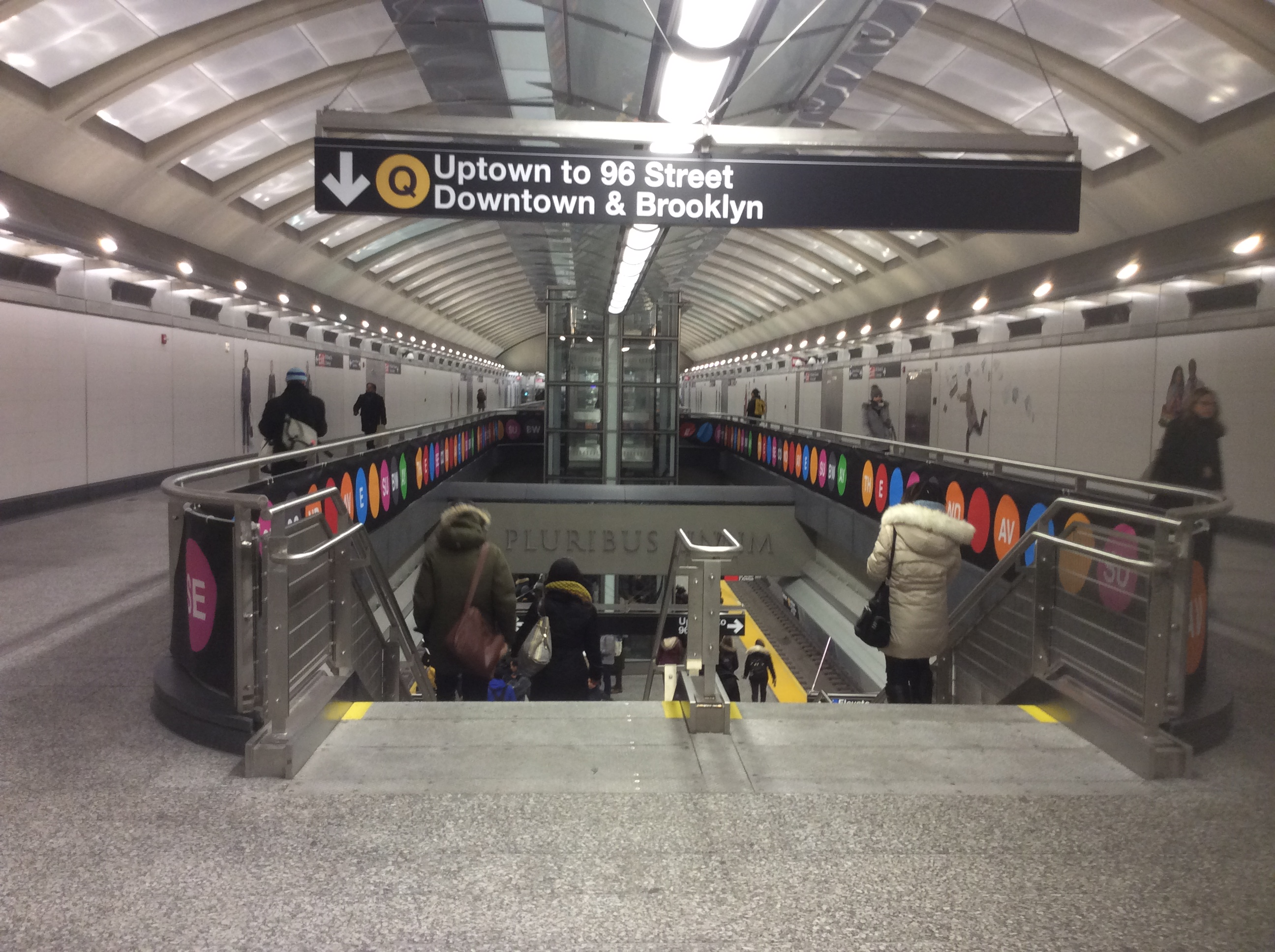
Mezzanine

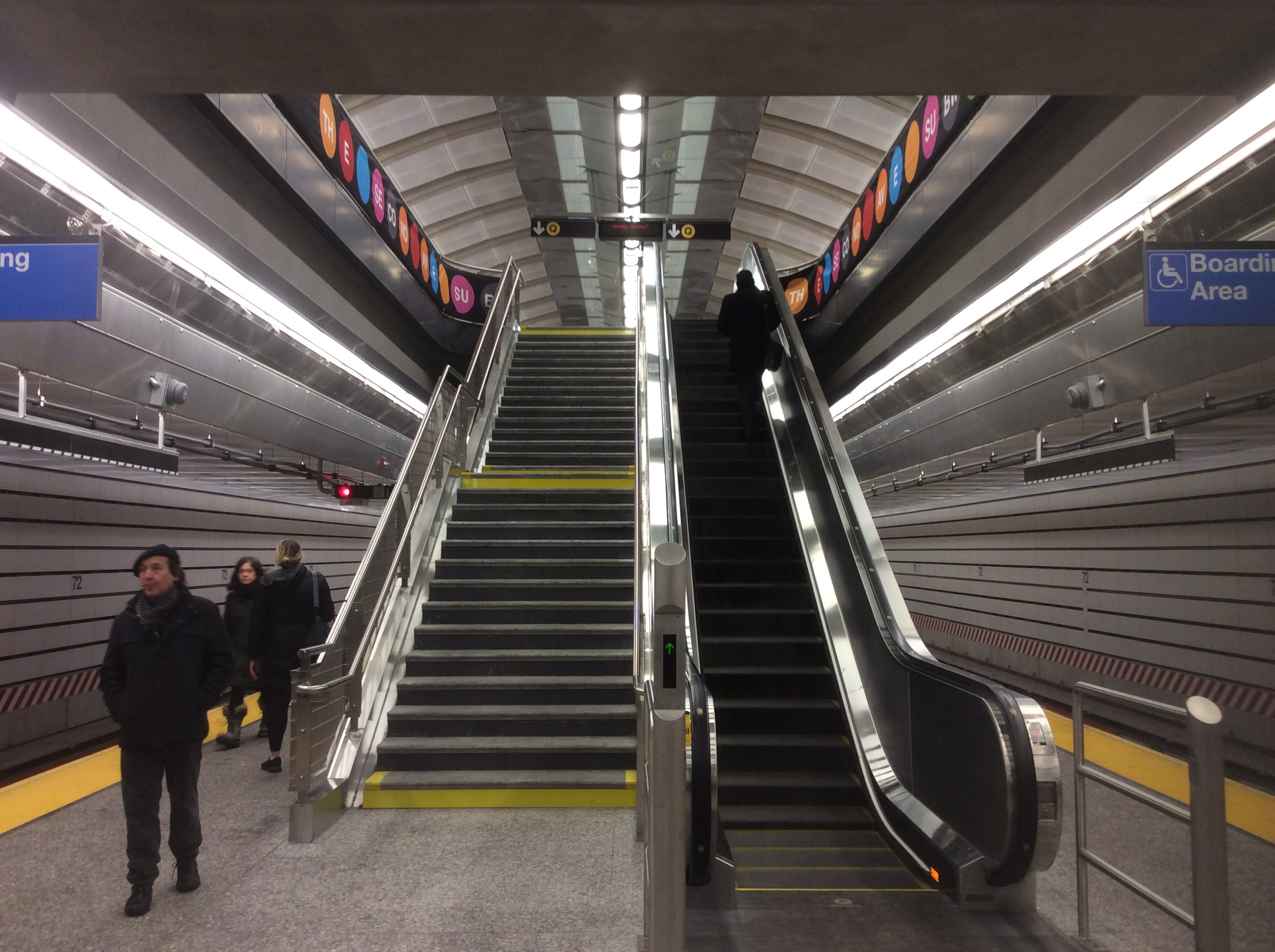
Escalator to mezzanine

The Second Avenue Line was originally proposed in 1919 as part of a massive expansion of what would become the Independent Subway System (IND). Work on the line never commenced, as the Great Depression crushed the economy. Numerous plans for the Second Avenue Subway appeared throughout the 20th century, but these were usually deferred due to lack of funds. In anticipation of the never-built new subway line, the Second and Third Avenue elevated lines were demolished in 1942 and 1955, respectively. The Second Avenue Elevated had one station at 72nd Street and Second Avenue—right above the same intersection where the current subway station is located—while the Third Avenue Elevated had two nearby stops on nearby Third Avenue at 67th Street and 76th Street.

=== Unrealized proposals ===
As part of the New York City Transit Authority's 1968 Program for Action, the construction of the full-length Second Avenue Subway was proposed. It was to be built in two phases—the first phase from 126th to 34th Streets, the second phase from 34th to Whitehall Streets. The line's planned stops in Manhattan, spaced farther apart than those on existing subway lines, proved controversial; the Second Avenue line was criticized as a "rich man's express, circumventing the Lower East Side with its complexes of high-rise low- and middle-income housing and slums in favor of a silk stocking route." People protested for almost a year over the lack of stations at 72nd Street, and a Lenox Hill (72nd Street) station was added in October 1970.

All Second Avenue Subway stations built under the Program for Action would have included escalators, high intensity lighting, improved audio systems, platform edge strips, and non-slip floors to accommodate the needs of the elderly and people with disabilities, but no elevators. Space at each station would have been used for ancillary facilities. The stations were to be made with brick walls and pavers alongside stainless steel, and would have relatively small dimensions, with 10-foot (3.0 m) mezzanine ceilings. Carson, Lundin & Thorson received a contract for the design of the 72nd Street station.

A combination of Federal and State funding was obtained, and despite the controversy over the number of stops and route, a groundbreaking ceremony was held on October 27, 1972, at Second Avenue and 103rd Street. Although work on the 72nd Street station never commenced, three short segments of tunnel in East Harlem and Chinatown were built. However, the city soon experienced its most dire fiscal crisis yet, due to the stagnant economy of the early 1970s, combined with the massive outflow of city residents to the suburbs, and in September 1975, construction on the line stopped, and the tunnels were sealed.

In 1999, the Regional Plan Association considered a full-length Second Avenue Subway, which included 72nd Street as one of its planned 31 stations. The entrances to 72nd Street station were to be located at 70th, 72nd, and 74th Streets. The final environmental impact statement was released for the station in April 2004. The initial design of the 72nd Street station lasted about eight years, between 1999 and 2007.

=== Construction ===
In March 2007, plans for the construction of the Second Avenue Subway were revived. The line's first phase, the "first major expansion" to the New York City Subway in more than a half-century, included three stations in total (at 72nd, 86th, and 96th Streets), which collectively cost $4.45 to $4.5 billion. Its construction site was designated as being from 105th Street and Second Avenue to 63rd Street and Third Avenue. The MTA awarded a $337 million contract—one that included constructing the tunnels between 92nd and 63rd Streets, building a launch box for the tunnel boring machine (TBM) at 92nd to 95th Streets, and erecting access shafts at 69th and 72nd Streets—to Schiavone Construction, Skanska USA Civil, and J.F. Shea Construction.

Due to cost increases for construction materials and diesel fuel affecting the prices of contracts not yet signed, the MTA announced in June 2008 that certain features of the Second Avenue Subway would be simplified to save money. One set of changes, which significantly reduced the footprint of the subway in the vicinity of 72nd Street, was the alteration of the 72nd Street station from a three-track, two-platform design to a two-track, single island platform design, paired with a simplification of the connection to the Broadway Line spur. Supplemental environmental impact studies covering the changes for the 72nd Street station was completed in June 2009.

In May 2010, a tunnel boring machine beginning at 92nd Street started to dig down Second Avenue through the 72nd Street area, to 63rd Street and Lexington Avenue.

On October 1, 2010, MTA awarded a $431 million contract to SSK Constructors (a joint venture) for the mining of the tunnels connecting the 72nd Street station to the existing 63rd Street station, and for the excavation and heavy civil structures of the 72nd Street Station. Construction was to be done through two shafts at 69th and 72nd Streets, the locations of the future entrances; shaft sinking work was started in late 2010. Projected completion of the contract was estimated at November 2013. The rock around the area is mostly Manhattan schist, and was generally considered to be a stable location for blasting, so blasting for the station commenced on January 18, 2011.

On August 8, 2012, a controlled blast at 72nd Street caused rocks to fly over the station site. Nearly two weeks later, on August 21, 2012, an uncontrolled blast for the Second Avenue Subway station at 72nd Street was done incorrectly, causing a large explosion that sent debris into the air and broke windows of buildings in the area and damaged nearby sidewalks.

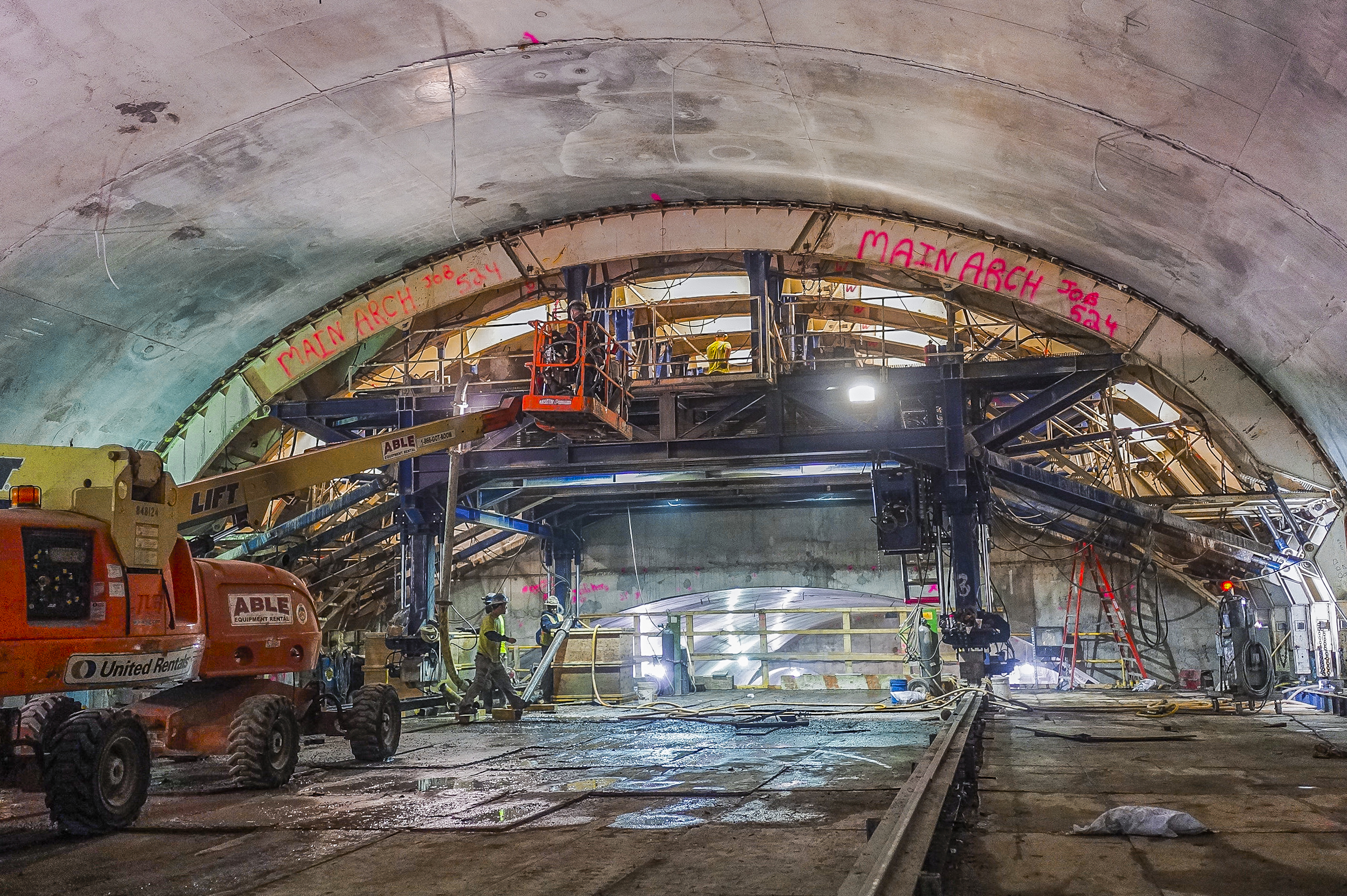
Arch form work

Cavern drilling was finished in August 2012; however, blasting for the station entrances was not completed until February 28, 2013. Demolition of a muck house, erected in August 2011 to remove mud from the tunnels, was finished by October 2013. By January 2013, almost 96.3% of excavation was completed, with 177,873 cubic yards (135,994 m^{3}) of dirt excavated from the station; waterproofing was also being done in the station and the tunnels south of it. The contract for the station's finishing touches, including the electrical, plumbing, track, and signal systems, as well as entrances and exits, was awarded to Judlau Contracting at a price of $258 million in February 2013. As of May 12, 2014, the mezzanine level of the station was completed and being used to store equipment. In September, the station's size was gauged by Gothamist to be so large that "55,000 elephants could fit" within the enormous cavern.

The station's ancillaries at 72nd and 69th Street were planned to be completed in winter 2014–2015, but by October 2016, the finishing touches on the ancillaries were still being applied. The station's mezzanine, plumbing, electricity and machinery were originally scheduled to be finished in fall 2015, but the estimated completion date was pushed back to September 2016 and then later to simply the "fall of 2016".

As of April 2015, the station was 56% complete, and as of October 2016, the station was 92% complete. However, in July 2016, it was reported that the station's opening could be delayed because the station's elevator had not been delivered and because the communication systems at the station had yet to be finished. The elevators and communication systems still needed to be finished by October 2016, and it was possible that the station's opening could be delayed. With the station being delayed, the possibility of opening the other two stations of the line in December but skipping this station was being considered. On December 14, though, the MTA announced that all of the line's stations would open at the same time. Still, systems testing at this station had not been completed by December 19. The station opened on January 1, 2017.

=== Phase Three ===
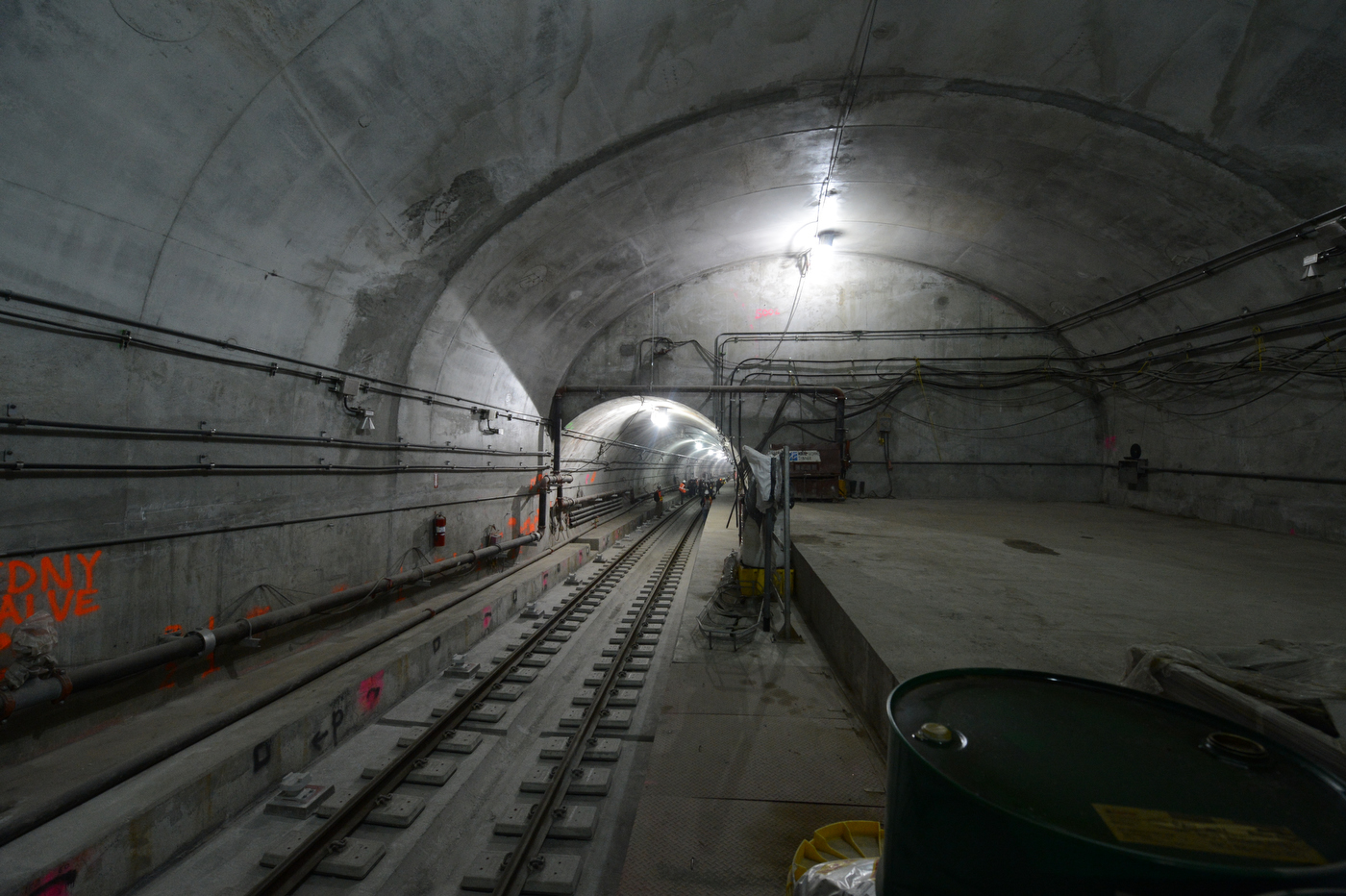
Future junction between Phase 1, future Phase 3, and the 63rd Street Connector

Once construction on Phase 2 of the Second Avenue Subway, which will run from 105th Street to the Harlem–125th Street station at Lexington Avenue, is completed, construction is expected to start on Phase 3, which would extend the Second Avenue Subway south down Second Avenue to Houston Street. The tracks would diverge from the tracks that continue to the BMT 63rd Street Line running south on Second Avenue. There is currently a large provisional cavern, or bellmouth, for this line. However, no funding has been committed to this phase. After Phase 3, a new T service will operate from Harlem–125th Street to Houston Street.

An additional two-track connection, tracks ST-1 and ST-2, is planned between the line toward Lower Manhattan (around 63rd Street) and the IND 63rd Street Line toward Queens using existing bellmouths that are at 63rd Street and First Avenue. Current plans do not call for it to be used by regular service, but instead to be used for non-revenue moves, and to provide a connection to the Jamaica Yard maintenance depot. The connection would allow for trains to run from the Financial District to Queens if the capacity of the IND Queens Boulevard Line was increased, or if the Queens Super-Express Bypass was built.

== Station layout ==
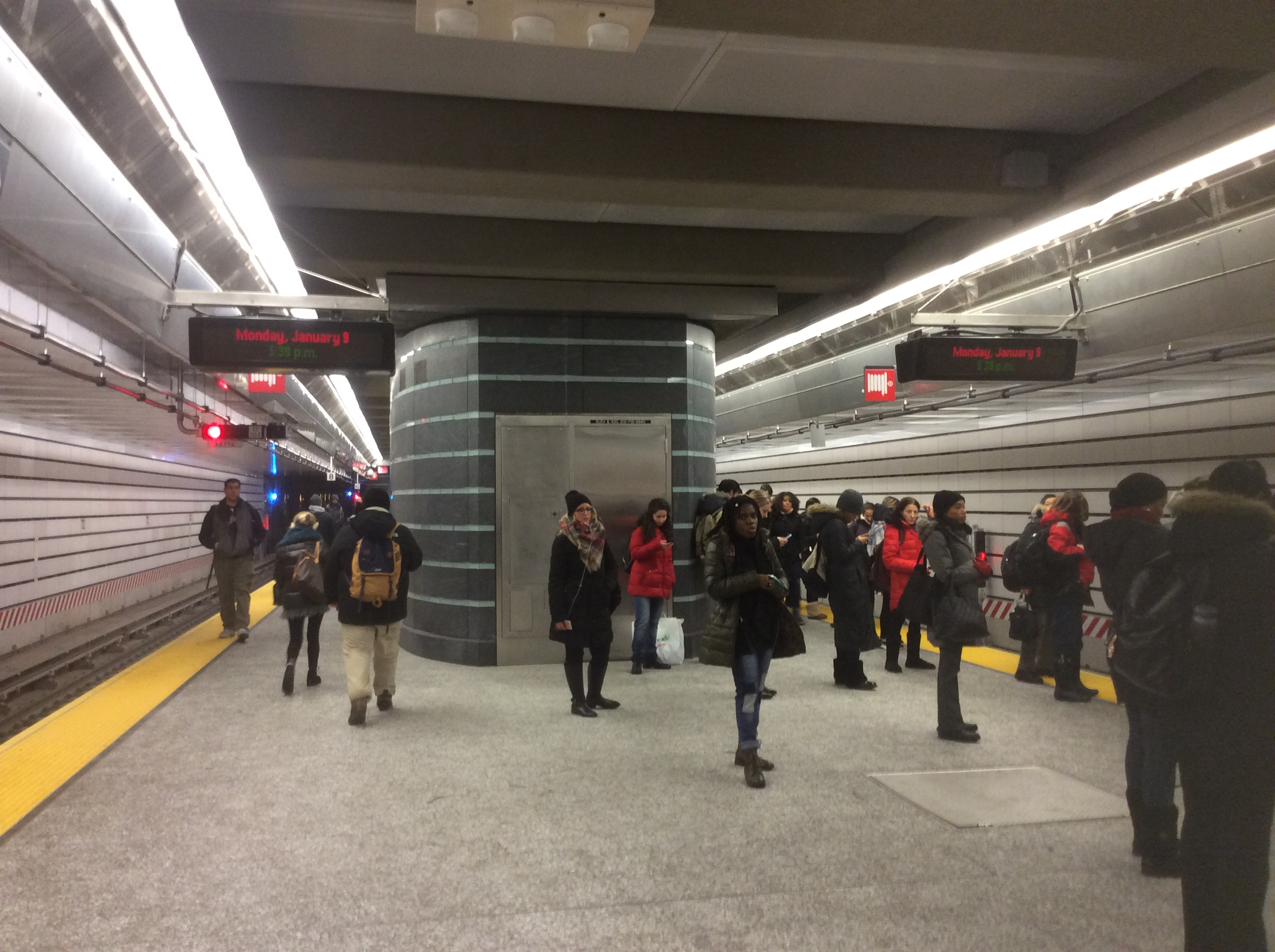
Platform during rush hour

The 72nd Street station is served by Q trains at all times, some N trains during rush hours, and one northbound R train during the AM rush hours. The station is between 86th Street to the north and Lexington Avenue–63rd Street to the south. It has two tracks and an island platform. The station is built so that it is more wide open than most other underground subway stations in the system, like other Second Avenue Subway stations but unlike existing New York City Subway stations. Due to its openness, the station was likened to a Washington Metro station by Michael Horodniceanu, President of MTA Capital Construction. The deep-level platform is approximately 99 feet (30 m) below ground, making it the deepest of the three stations built under phase 1. The platform for the 72nd Street station, like the other Second Avenue Subway stations, is 27.8 feet (8.5 m) wide. As with other stations on the first phase of the Second Avenue Subway, it was designed and engineered by a joint venture of Arup and AECOM.

The station has air-cooling systems to make it at least 10 °F (6 °C) cooler than other subway stations during the summer. This requires the station to have large ventilation and ancillary buildings, rather than traditional subway grates. The station is also compliant with current fire codes, whereas most existing stations are not. Additionally, the station is waterproofed with concrete liners and fully drained. In early plans, the Second Avenue Subway was supposed to have platform screen doors to assist with air-cooling, energy savings, ventilation, and track safety, but this plan was scrapped in 2012 as cost-prohibitive. According to an internal study prepared for the MTA in 2020, the 72nd Street station could theoretically accommodate half-height platform edge doors. Full-height platform screen doors would be possible but would necessitate the installation of structural bracing and relocation of several mechanical systems.

=== Track layout ===
Diamond crossovers are located in the cavern both north and south of the station, with a flying junction to the BMT 63rd Street Line via tracks G3 and G4 just south of the southern crossover. The station cavern, which includes both crossovers, is 1,300 feet (400 m) long. South of this station there are provisions for the Second Avenue Subway to continue further south via Second Avenue. The tracks would pass over track G4, which connects the BMT 63rd Street Line to the uptown Second Avenue Subway track, track S2.

The 72nd Street station was conceived as a three-track station with two island platforms, but prior to construction was reduced to a two-track, one-island platform station, due to the high cost of building a three-track, two-platform station. Additionally, the station's width was shaved back from 100 feet (30 m) to 70 feet (21 m). Although this served to reduce costs, it also removed a lot of operational flexibility from the 72nd Street station, since trains cannot be turned back at the station without severely disrupting service.

=== Artwork ===
The station artwork, Perfect Strangers, consists of portraits by artist and photographer Vik Muniz. In February 2014, Muniz was chosen in a MTA Arts & Design competition with more than 100 entrants.

Muniz's artwork comprises 36 mosaic-cast portraits of real people who look like they are waiting for a train. These portraits, based on photographs of his acquaintances, are scattered along the exits and mezzanine. The portraits include those of chef Daniel Boulud and designer Waris Ahluwalia. Muniz also has a portrait of himself, running after a wayward suitcase while papers fly away behind him. A married same-sex couple is also depicted, marking the first permanent, non-political LGBT art in New York City. The depiction is based on a photograph of a same-sex couple. The Jewish magazine Forward claimed that the work was antisemitic because one of the figures was a Jewish man holding a globe and luggage.

=== Exits and ancillary buildings ===
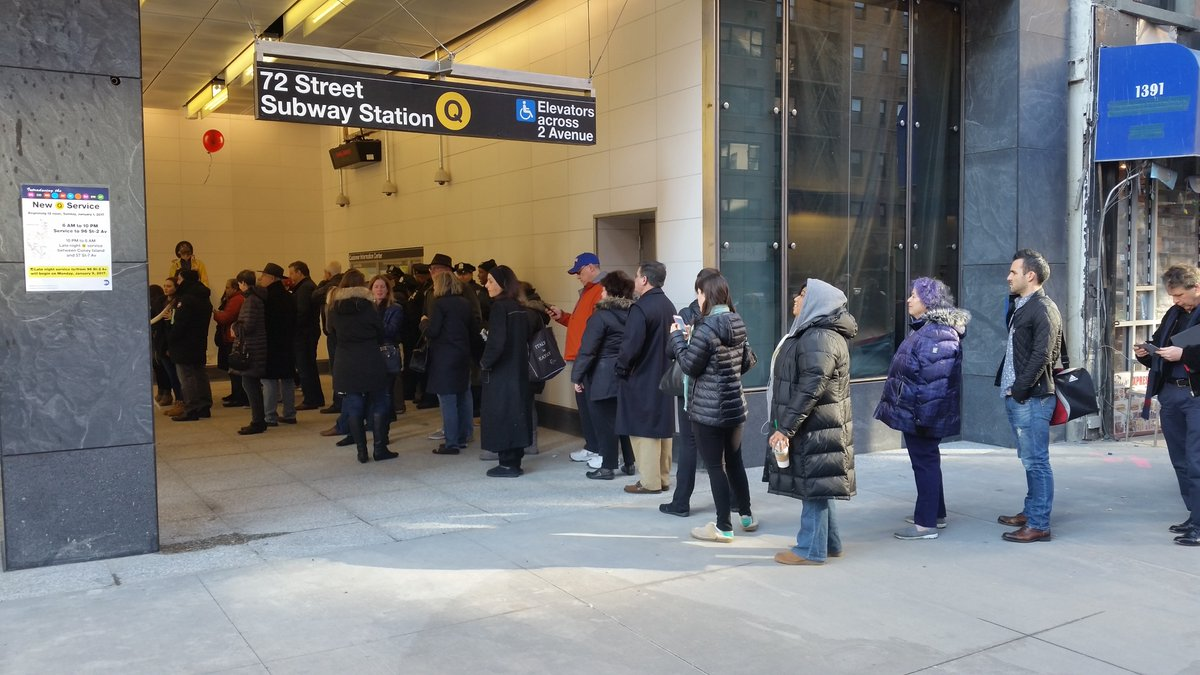
Crowds at Entrance 2 on opening day

The current station layout includes 3 numbered entrances/exits, containing 11 escalators in addition to 5 elevators. There are also two ancillary buildings that contain station equipment. One building at the northwest corner of Second Avenue and 72nd Street contains both ancillary equipment and a station entrance.

The entrances and exits are located at:

| Location | Exit Type | Number of exits |
|---|---|---|
| Entrance 1 NE corner of Second Avenue and 69th Street | Staircase; Escalator | 1 staircase 1 escalator |
| Entrance 1 SE corner of Second Avenue and 70th Street | Staircase; Escalator | 1 staircase 1 escalator |
| Entrance 2 (at Ancillary 2); Building, NW corner of Second Avenue and 72nd Street | Escalator | 3 escalators |
| Entrance 3 SE corner of Second Avenue and 72nd Street | Elevator | 1 bank of 5 elevators |

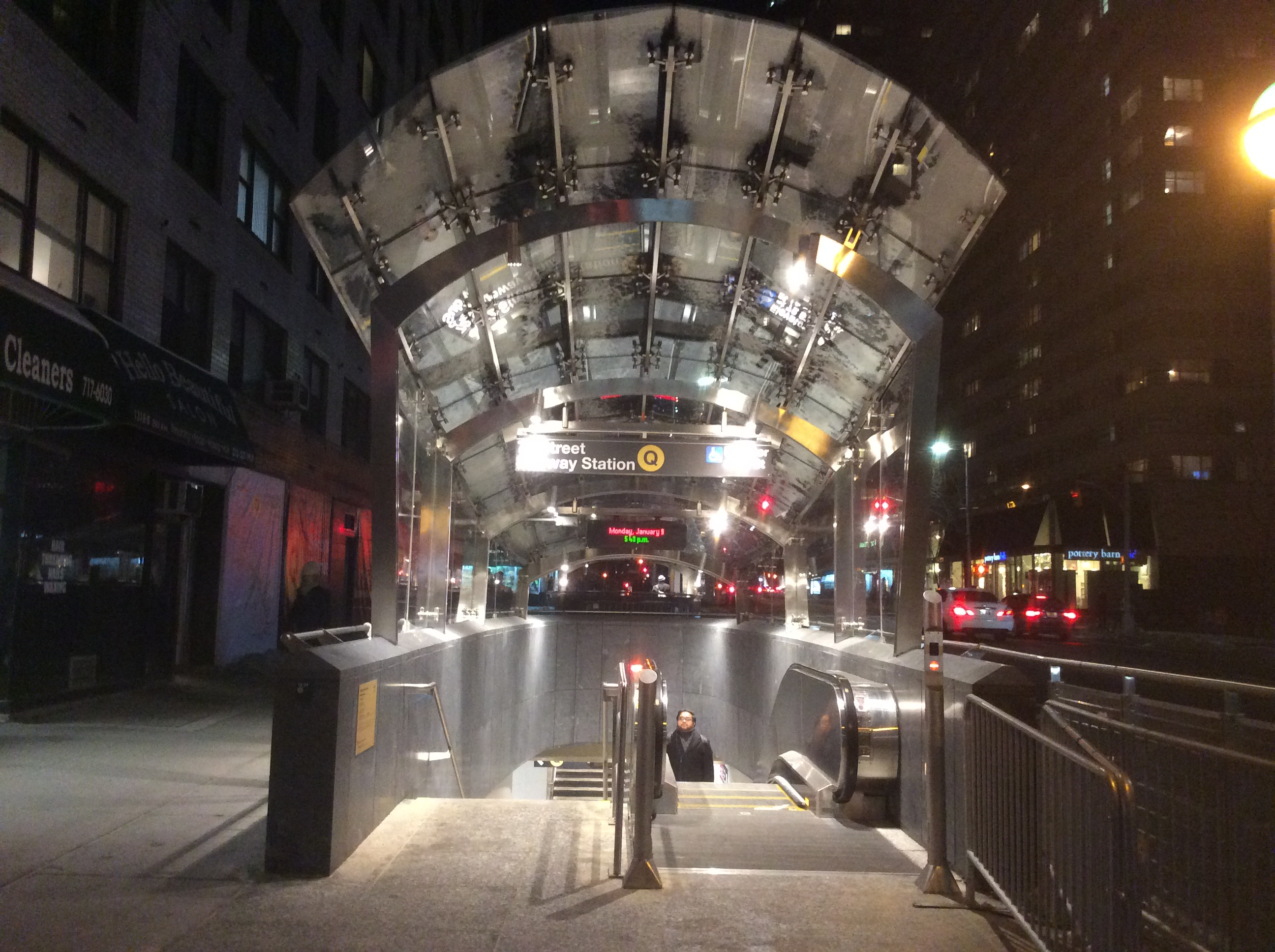
70th Street exit at night

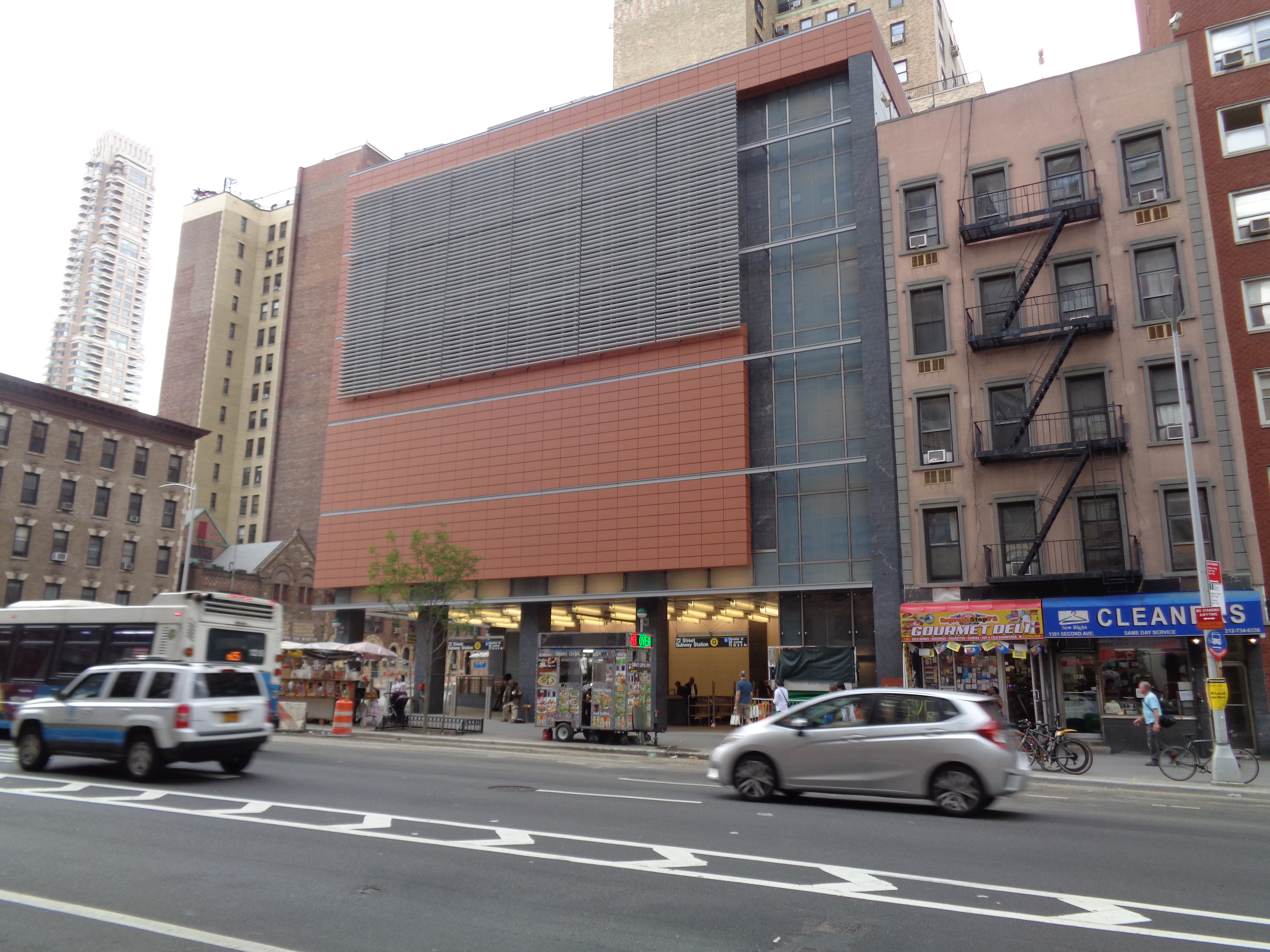
The entrance and ventilation building at 72nd Street

The two ancillary buildings are located at:

- Ancillary 1: Northwest corner of 69th Street and Second Avenue
- Ancillary 2: Northwest corner of 72nd Street and Second Avenue

In 2007, some area residents filed a lawsuit in opposition to a proposed entrance at 72nd Street between First and Second Avenues, in front of residential buildings at 320 and 340 East 72nd Street, citing that the entrance would take up space on the sidewalk. Due to vocal community opposition, the MTA non-publicly revised plans for the subway entrance in fall 2007, relocating the planned entrance to the southeast corner of Second Avenue and 72nd Street

Two years later, in 2009, a Finding Of No Significant Impact by the Federal Transit Administration found that a proposed entrance at the northeast corner of Second Avenue and 72nd Street was unfeasible, as was the proposed single sidewalk elevator at the southeast corner. The northeast-corner entrance, within the 305 East 72nd Street apartment building, would have encroached into a portion of CVS Pharmacy's ground-floor retail space as well as the apartment building's basement, which contained its laundry room and several of its utility intake pipes. Building the northeast-corner entrance would have forced the owners of 305 East 72nd Street to move their laundry room and utilities into the retail space occupied by CVS, so plans for the northeast-corner entrance were canceled. The site for the sidewalk elevator on the southeast corner turned out to be located close to a high-pressure steam main that was 48 inches (120 cm) in diameter. After a 2007 steam main explosion in Midtown, utility provider Consolidated Edison changed its guidelines for clearance around high-pressure mains, which meant that the elevator was now too close to the main. Thus, the plan was revised to place the elevator inside a building. Of the three alternatives presented for combining the two entrances, the MTA chose an alternative in which there would be five elevators inside a building at the southeast corner of Second Avenue and 72nd Street. This required the demolition of 300 East 72nd Street so that a new building for the five elevators could be built.

In 2013, the MTA filed to change the location of Entrance 1, moving it onto from the sidewalk, away from its original proposed location inside 301 East 69th Street. This was because designs for entrances inside the building failed to both satisfy the building's residents as well as meet the MTA's engineering requirements. With the New York City Department of Transportation planning a bike lane along the east side of Second Avenue after construction is finished, the MTA could widen the sidewalk to make room for the entrances without ultimately disrupting traffic flow.

== Effects ==
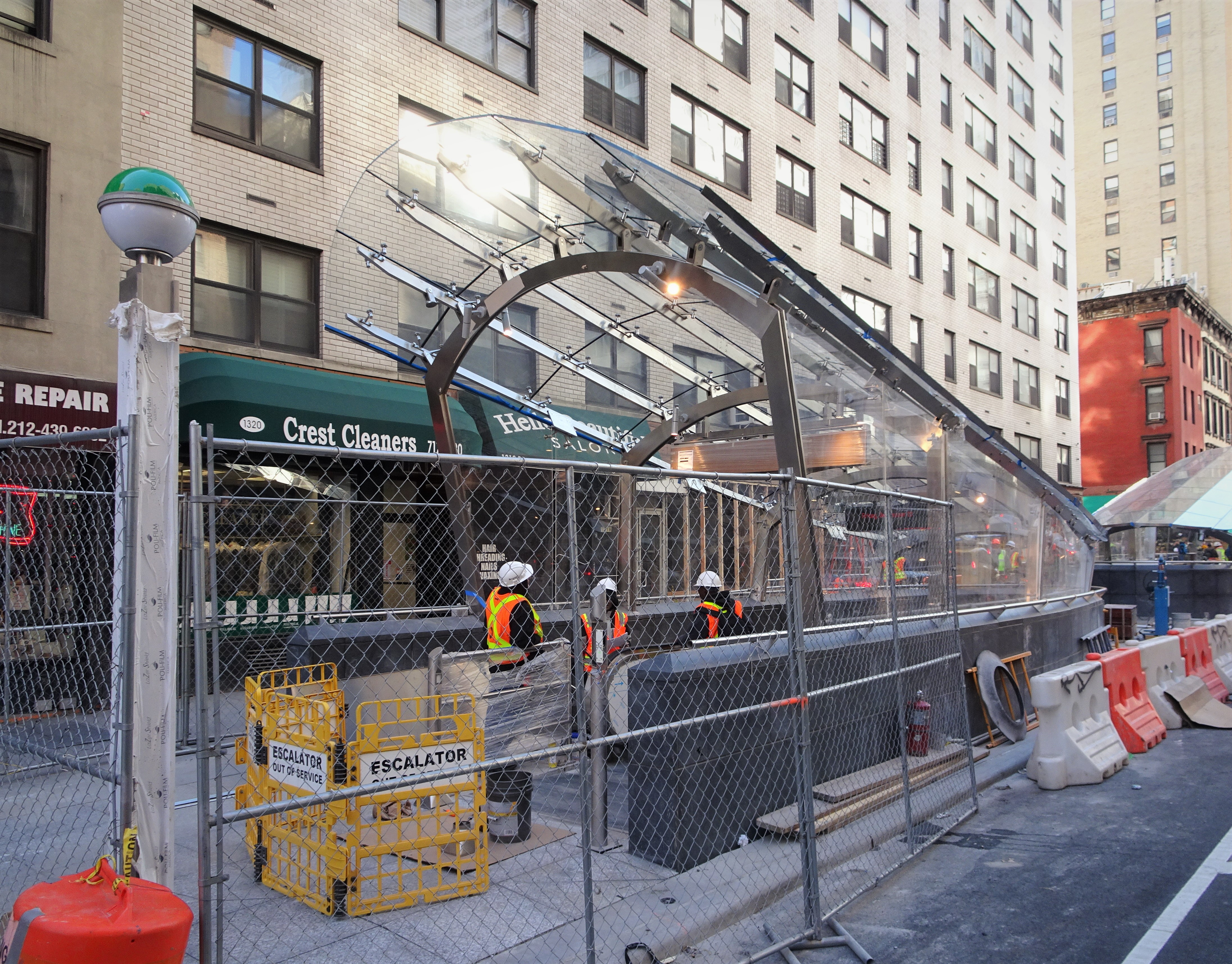
70th Street entrance under construction

Business declined during the construction and blasting of the station, with many storefronts losing business and some even being forced to close. However, starting in 2013, construction of the station has caused the value of real estate in the area to start to rise. Although the surrounding area's real estate prices had been declining since the 1990s, there had been increases in the purchases and leases of residential units around the area, causing real estate prices to rise again. On the Upper East Side, prices of real estate west of Third Avenue had historically been higher than prices east of there, but due to the subway's construction, prices of real estate east of the avenue had risen dramatically since the station's construction started. With the opening of the new station, business owners hoped to see an increase in patronage.
