= 76th Street station =

76th Street station may refer to:

- 76th Street station (IRT Third Avenue Line), a local station on the demolished IRT Third Avenue Line
- 76th Street station (IND Fulton Street Line), a station rumored to exist to the east of Euclid Avenue station on the IND Fulton Street Line
