= Lexington Houses =

Public housing development in Manhattan, New York

- NYCHA Property
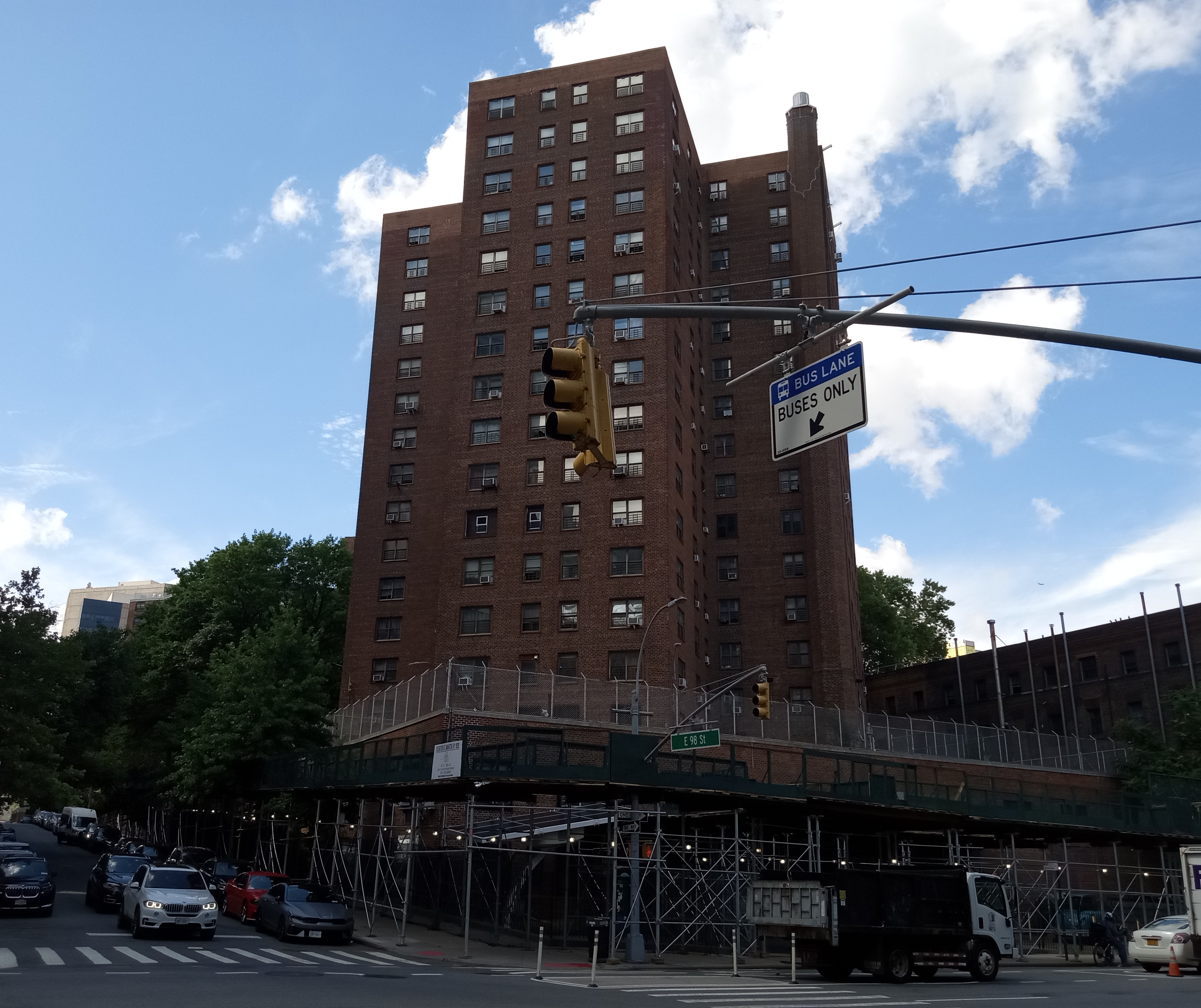
- Interactive map of Lexington Houses
- Country: United States
- State: New York
- City: New York City
- Borough: Manhattan

Area
  - Total: 3.54 acres (1.43 ha)

Population
  - Total: 766
- Zip Code: 10029

The Lexington Houses are a NYCHA housing project containing 4 buildings that each have 14 stories. It is located between East 98th and 99th Streets and also between 3rd and Park Avenues in East Harlem, Manhattan.

== History ==
The first building at the Lexington Houses (110 East 99th Street) opened on November 9, 1950; this housing project was completed on March 16, 1951. The complex was designed by architect J.M. Berlinger.

The site of the housing project was previously occupied by the 99th Street Yard of the Third Avenue Elevated. Substation 7 remains on a corner of the site (at the southwest corner of 3rd Avenue and East 99th Street), which was built in 1902 to supply power to a portion of the elevated railway and is now listed on the National Register of Historic Places.

In 1950, one of the apartments in the newly opened housing project was decorated by students from the home economics department at Hunter College, who were given a project of furnishing a four-and-a-half room apartment within a budget of $2,000 (equivalent to $26,763 in 2025). Some of the pieces they used were improvised, such as a two-foot-high (0.61 m) pickle barrel for a coffee table that doubled as an ottoman with the addition of a cushion. On November 1, 1954, the housing complex's nursery school was visited by Queen Mother Elizabeth of Great Britain. At the time, the facility was serving as an experimental day care center for the Mills College of Education and Teachers College.

The community garden at the housing complex was expanded and renovated in 2022.

== See also ==
- New York City Housing Authority
