= 99th Street station (IRT Third Avenue Line) =

Former Manhattan Railway elevated station (closed 1940)

99th ST.
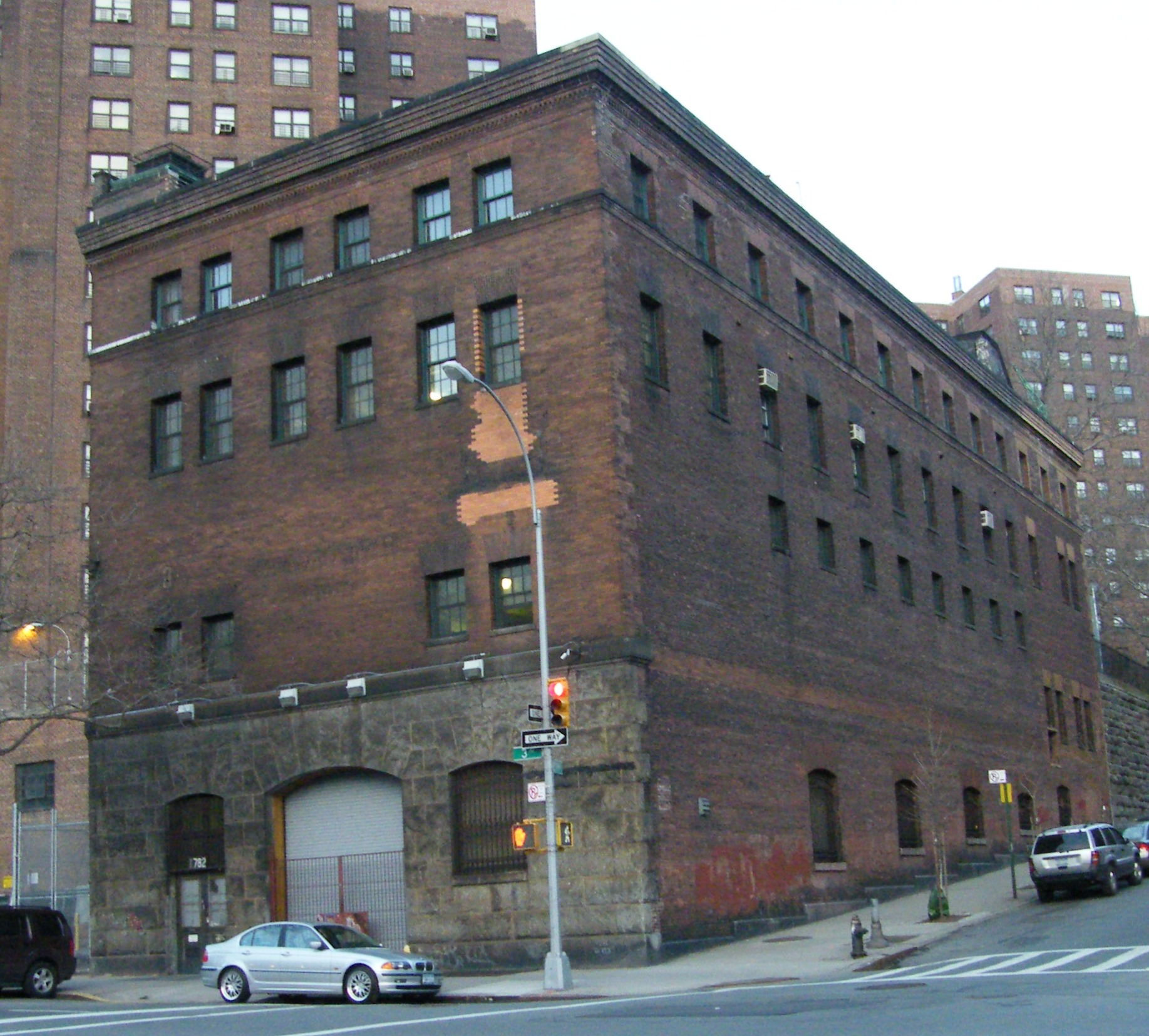
- Power station

General information
- Location: East 99th Street and 3rd Avenue; Upper Manhattan, Manhattan, New York
- Coordinates: 40°47′12.7″N 73°56′53″W
- System: Former Manhattan Railway elevated station
- Operator: Interborough Rapid Transit Company; City of New York (1940–1953); New York City Transit Authority
- Line: Third Avenue Line
- Platforms: 2 side platforms
- Tracks: 3

Construction
- Structure type: Elevated

History
- Opened: December 30, 1878; 147 years ago
- Closed: May 12, 1955; 71 years ago

Former services
Preceding station	Interborough Rapid Transit	Following station
106th Street toward 129th Street	Third Avenue Local	89th Street toward South Ferry
Location

The 99th Street station was a local station on the demolished IRT Third Avenue Line in Manhattan, New York City. The station was originally built by the Manhattan Railway Company on December 30, 1878, and later had two levels. The lower level serving local trains was built first, and had two tracks and two side platforms. The upper level, built as part of the Dual Contracts had one track that bypassed the station and served express trains. This station closed on May 12, 1955, with the ending of all service on the Third Avenue El south of 149th Street. South of the station were connecting tracks to the 98th Street Yard. The station was also located next to Substation 7 an old IRT substation designed not only in order to electrify the Third Avenue Line, but the Second and Ninth Avenue elevated lines as well. Later it even served as a power source for the IRT Lexington Avenue Line from 1918 until the 1970s. The substation is still owned by the MTA and has been listed on the National Register of Historic Places since February 9, 2006.
