= 67th Street station =

Former Manhattan Railway elevated station (closed 1955)

67th ST.
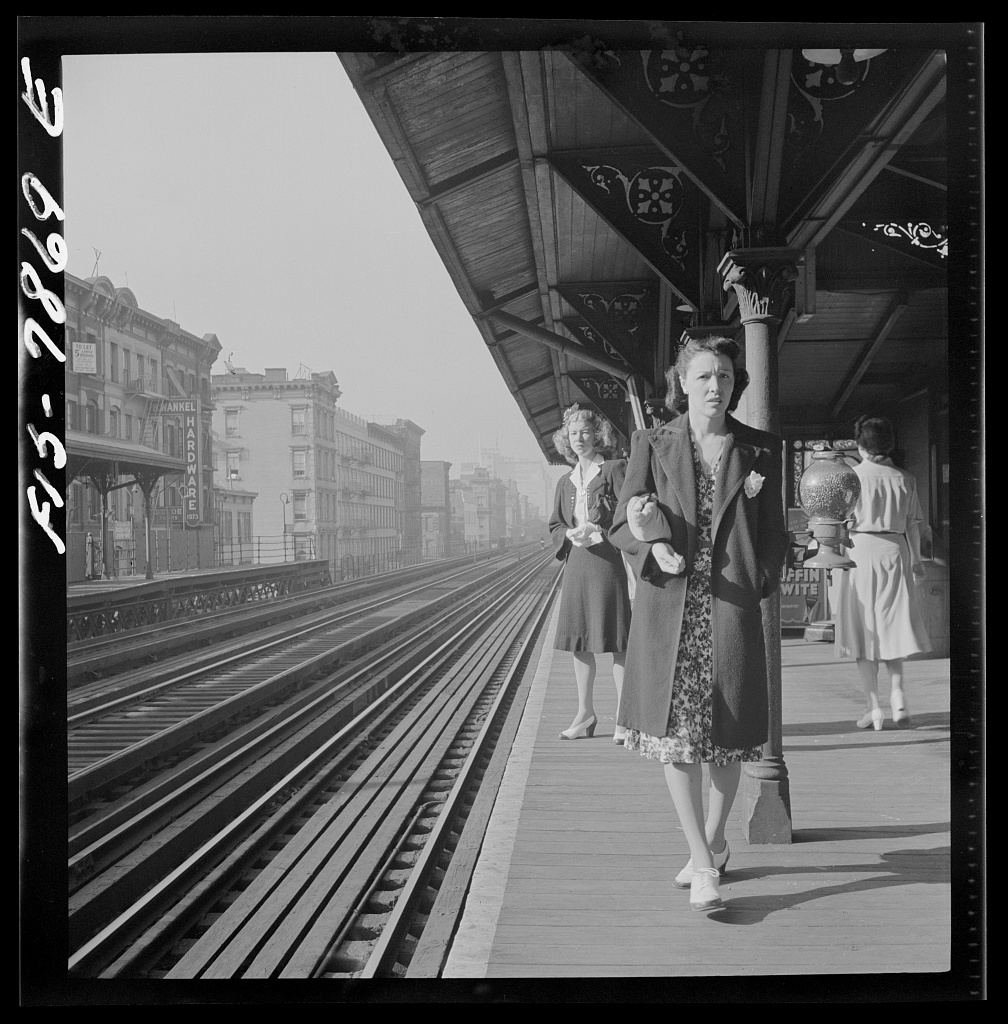
- HABS image of three women waiting for a train at 67th Street in September 1942.

General information
- Location: East 67th Street and 3rd Avenue; Upper Manhattan, Manhattan, New York
- Coordinates: 40°45′59.6″N 73°57′46.6″W
- System: Former Manhattan Railway elevated station
- Operator: Interborough Rapid Transit Company; City of New York (1940–1953); New York City Transit Authority
- Line: Third Avenue Line
- Platforms: 2 side platforms
- Tracks: 3

Construction
- Structure type: Elevated

History
- Opened: September 16, 1878; 148 years ago
- Closed: May 12, 1955; 71 years ago

Former services
Preceding station	Interborough Rapid Transit	Following station
76th Street toward 129th Street	Third Avenue Local	59th Street toward South Ferry
Location

The 67th Street station was a local station on the demolished IRT Third Avenue Line in Manhattan, New York City. It had two tracks and two side platforms. 67th Street station opened on September 16, 1878, by the New York Elevated Railway Company, and was the terminus of the IRT Third Avenue Line until it was expanded to 89th Street on December 9, 1878. This station closed on May 12, 1955, with the ending of all service on the Third Avenue El south of 149th Street.
