= Substation 7 =

- U.S. National Register of Historic Places
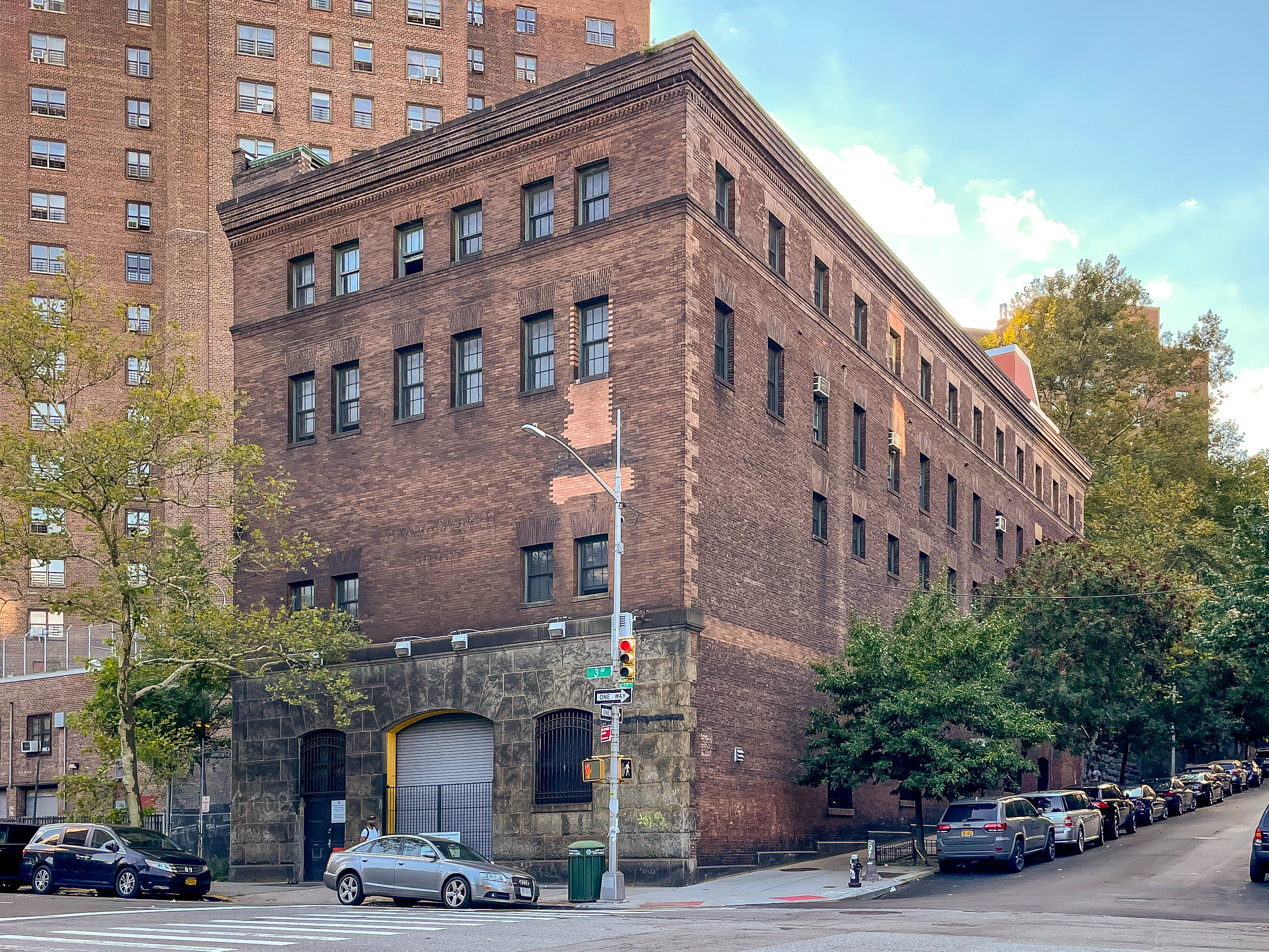

- Location within New York City Location within New York Location within the United States
- Location: 1782 Third Avenue, New York, New York
- Coordinates: 40°47′14″N 73°56′54″W
- Area: less than one acre
- Built: 1902
- Architectural style: Beaux Arts
- MPS: New York City Subway System MPS
- NRHP reference No.: 06000027
- Added to NRHP: February 9, 2006

Substation 7 is a traction substation located at 1782 Third Avenue at 99th Street in the East Harlem neighborhood of Manhattan. The Manhattan Railway Company built it next to the Third Avenue El's 99th Street station to electrify the Second, Third and Ninth Avenue elevated lines. It served as a power source for the IRT Lexington Avenue Line from 1918 until the 1970s. It originally converted 25 Hz AC power from the 74th Street power station, to DC for the electric motors.

The substation is owned by the MTA and it is listed on the National Register of Historic Places. The facility was originally situated at the corner of the 99th Street Yard of the Third Avenue Elevated, which was demolished and replaced by the Lexington Houses.
