= 84th Street station =

Former Manhattan Railway elevated station (closed 1955)

84th ST.

General information
- Location: East 84th Street and 3rd Avenue; Upper Manhattan, Manhattan, New York
- Coordinates: 40°46′39″N 73°57′17.6″W
- System: Former Manhattan Railway elevated station
- Operator: Interborough Rapid Transit Company; City of New York (1940–1953); New York City Transit Authority
- Line: Third Avenue Line
- Platforms: 2 side platforms
- Tracks: 3

Construction
- Structure type: Elevated

History
- Opened: December 9, 1878; 147 years ago
- Closed: May 12, 1955; 71 years ago

Former services
Preceding station	Interborough Rapid Transit	Following station
89th Street toward 129th Street	Third Avenue Local	76th Street toward South Ferry
Location

The 84th Street station was a local station on the demolished IRT Third Avenue Line in Manhattan, New York City. It was originally built on December 9, 1878. The station had two side platforms and was served by local trains only. This station closed on May 12, 1955, with the ending of all service on the Third Avenue El south of 149th Street.
