= 76th Street station (IRT Third Avenue Line) =

Former Manhattan Railway elevated station (closed 1955)

76th ST.
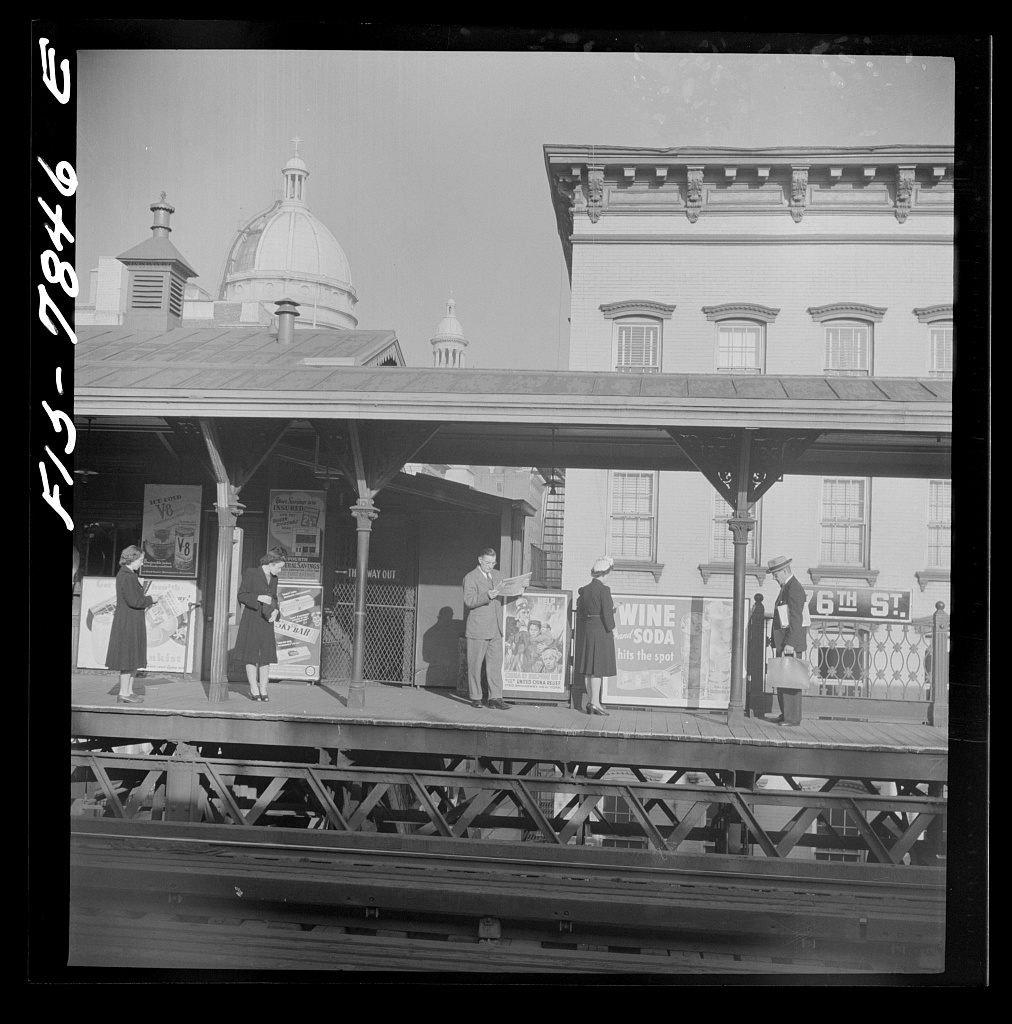
- 1942 image of one of the 76th Street platforms

General information
- Location: East 76th Street and 3rd Avenue; Upper Manhattan, Manhattan, New York
- Coordinates: 40°46′20″N 73°57′31.5″W
- System: Former Manhattan Railway elevated station
- Operator: Interborough Rapid Transit Company; City of New York (1940–1953); New York City Transit Authority
- Line: Third Avenue Line
- Platforms: 2 side platforms
- Tracks: 3

Construction
- Structure type: Elevated

History
- Opened: December 9, 1878; 147 years ago
- Closed: May 12, 1955; 71 years ago

Former services
| Preceding station | Interborough Rapid Transit | Following station |
|---|---|---|
| 84th Street toward 129th Street | Third Avenue Local | 67th Street toward South Ferry |
Location

The 76th Street station was a local station on the demolished IRT Third Avenue Line in Manhattan, New York City. It was originally built on December 9, 1878. The outer tracks served local trains and it had two side platforms. The center track was built as part of the Dual Contracts and was served by express trains. This station closed on May 12, 1955, with the ending of all service on the Third Avenue El south of 149th Street.
