= 89th Street station =

Former Manhattan Railway elevated station (closed 1955)

89th ST.

General information
- Location: East 89th Street and 3rd Avenue; Upper Manhattan, Manhattan, New York
- Coordinates: 40°46′50.5″N 73°57′09″W
- System: Former Manhattan Railway elevated station
- Operator: Interborough Rapid Transit Company; City of New York (1940–1953); New York City Transit Authority
- Line: Third Avenue Line
- Platforms: 2 side platforms
- Tracks: 3

Construction
- Structure type: Elevated

History
- Opened: December 9, 1878; 147 years ago
- Closed: May 12, 1955; 71 years ago

Former services
Preceding station	Interborough Rapid Transit	Following station
99th Street toward 129th Street	Third Avenue Local	84th Street toward South Ferry
Location

The 89th Street station was a local station on the demolished IRT Third Avenue Line in Manhattan, New York City. It was originally built on December 9, 1878. The outer tracks were served by local trains and two side platforms. The center track was built as part of the Dual Contracts, it bypassed the station and served express trains. 89th Street station was the terminus of the IRT Third Avenue Line until it was expanded to 129th Street on December 30, 1878. This station closed on May 12, 1955, with the ending of all service on the Third Avenue El south of 149th Street. North of the station were connecting tracks to the 98th Street Yard.
