= 58th Street Terminal =

Former Manhattan Railway elevated station (closed 1924)

58th St.

General information
- Location: West 58th Street and 6th Avenue; New York, NY; Upper Manhattan, Manhattan
- Coordinates: 40°45′54″N 73°58′36″W
- System: Former Manhattan Railway elevated station
- Operator: Interborough Rapid Transit Company
- Line: Sixth Avenue Line
- Platforms: 2 side platforms
- Tracks: 3

Construction
- Structure type: Elevated

History
- Opened: June 5, 1878; 148 years ago
- Closed: June 16, 1924; 102 years ago

Former services
| Preceding station | Interborough Rapid Transit | Following station |
|---|---|---|
| Terminus | Sixth Avenue Shuttle | 50th Street Terminus |
Location

The 58th Street Terminal or 58th Street station was a station on the demolished IRT Sixth Avenue Line in Manhattan, New York City. It had three tracks and two side platforms. The center track was used for storage. The station was opened by the Gilbert Elevated Railway on June 5, 1878, and served as the northern terminus of the IRT Sixth Avenue Line trains until the line was acquired by the Manhattan Railway Company and built a connecting spur from 50th Street station (the next southbound stop) along 53rd Street to the Ninth Avenue Elevated. It was replaced as the northernmost station on the line by the Eighth Avenue station in 1881. The New York City Transit Commission approved the discontinuation of service to 58th Street station on June 13, 1924. As part of the termination of train service, the line would be given to the city for use. The city claimed possession that day and the 58th Street station closed on an official basis on June 16.

Though there are no longer any New York City Subway stations explicitly named 58th Street, the area is now served by the underground 57th Street subway station, one block to the south of the former 58th Street Terminal.
