= 42nd Street station =

42nd Street station may refer to:

- 42nd Street–Bryant Park/Fifth Avenue station
- 42nd Street–Port Authority Bus Terminal station
- Grand Central–42nd Street station
- Times Square–42nd Street station
- 42nd Street station (IRT Second Avenue Line), 1880–1942
- 42nd Street station (IRT Third Avenue Line), 1878–1955
- 42nd Street station (IRT Sixth Avenue Line), 1878–1938
- 42nd Street station (IRT Ninth Avenue Line), 1875–1940
