= 59th Street station (IRT Ninth Avenue Line) =

Former Manhattan Railway elevated station (closed 1940)

59th St.

General information
- Location: West 59th Street and 9th Avenue, New York, NY; Upper Manhattan, Manhattan
- Coordinates: 40°46′9.15″N 73°59′5.16″W
- System: Former Manhattan Railway elevated station
- Operator: Interborough Rapid Transit Company
- Line: Ninth Avenue Line
- Platforms: 2 side platforms
- Tracks: 3

Construction
- Structure type: Elevated

History
- Opened: June 9, 1879; 147 years ago
- Closed: June 11, 1940; 86 years ago

Former services
Preceding station	Interborough Rapid Transit	Following station
66th Street toward 155th Street	Sixth Avenue	53rd Street and Eighth Avenue toward South Ferry
66th Street toward 155th Street	Ninth Avenue Local	50th Street toward South Ferry
Location

The 59th Street station was a local station on the demolished IRT Ninth Avenue Line in Manhattan, New York City. It had two levels. The lower level was built first and had two tracks and two side platforms that served local trains. The upper level was built as part of the Dual Contracts and had one track that served express trains. It closed on June 11, 1940. The next southbound stop was 50th Street for Ninth Avenue trains and Eighth Avenue for IRT Sixth Avenue Line trains. The next northbound stop was 66th Street.

On September 11, 1905, 12 people were killed and 42 injured in the Ninth Avenue derailment when a train that had just left the station was wrongly switched onto the curve at 53rd Street.
