= Grand Street =

Grand Street may refer to:

- Grand Street (magazine), an American magazine
- Grand Street (film), a 2013 film starring Kelly McGillis

== New York City ==
Streets

- Grand Street (Manhattan), a street in New York City
- Grand Street (Brooklyn), a street in New York City

Train stations

- Grand Street station (IRT Second Avenue Line), in Manhattan, demolished
- Grand Street station (IRT Sixth Avenue Line), in Manhattan, demolished
- Grand Street station (IRT Third Avenue Line), in Manhattan, demolished
- Grand Street station (BMT Canarsie Line), in Brooklyn; serving the L train
- Grand Street station (IND Sixth Avenue Line), in Manhattan; serving the B and D trains
- Grand Street station (LIRR Evergreen Branch) a station along the former Evergreen Branch (see Manhattan Beach Branch) of the Long Island Rail Road in Brooklyn from 1868 to 1885
- Grand Street station (LIRR Main Line), a former station in Queens along Main Line of the Long Island Rail Road that also served the Rockaway Beach Branch from 1913 to 1925

Services

- Grand Street Shuttle, a former New York City Subway service
- Forty-Second Street and Grand Street Ferry Railroad, a former Manhattan streetcar line

Other

- Grand Street Settlement, a settlement house in Manhattan

== See also ==
- Grand Avenue (disambiguation)
- Grand Boulevard (disambiguation)
