= 50th Street station (IRT Sixth Avenue Line) =

Former Manhattan Railway elevated station (closed 1938)

50th St.

General information
- Location: West 50th Street and 6th Avenue; New York, NY; Upper Manhattan, Manhattan
- Coordinates: 40°45′35.55″N 73°58′49.57″W
- System: Former Manhattan Railway elevated station
- Operator: Interborough Rapid Transit Company
- Line: Sixth Avenue Line
- Platforms: 2 side platforms
- Tracks: 2

Construction
- Structure type: Elevated

History
- Opened: June 5, 1878; 148 years ago
- Closed: December 4, 1938; 87 years ago

Former services
Preceding station	Interborough Rapid Transit	Following station
53rd Street and Eighth Avenue toward 155th Street	Sixth Avenue	42nd Street toward South Ferry
58th Street Terminus	Sixth Avenue Shuttle	Terminus
Location

The 50th Street station was a station on the demolished IRT Sixth Avenue Line in Manhattan, New York City. It had two tracks and two side platforms. It was served by trains from the IRT Sixth Avenue Line and opened on June 5, 1878. It closed on December 4, 1938. The next southbound stop was 42nd Street. For some trains, the next northbound stop was 58th Street Terminal until 1924, while for other trains, the next northbound stop was Eighth Avenue. For express trains, the next northbound stop was 66th Street on Ninth Avenue. Two years later after the station closed, it was replaced by the nearby underground 47th–50th Streets–Rockefeller Center (IND Sixth Avenue Line) subway station.
