= Chambers Street station (IRT Sixth Avenue Line) =

Former Manhattan Railway elevated station (closed 1938)

Chambers St.

General information
- Location: Chambers Street and West Broadway; New York, NY; Lower Manhattan, Manhattan
- Coordinates: 40°42′55.83″N 74°0′33.36″W
- System: Former Manhattan Railway elevated station
- Operator: Interborough Rapid Transit Company
- Line: Sixth Avenue Line
- Platforms: 2 side platforms
- Tracks: 2

Construction
- Structure type: Elevated

History
- Opened: June 5, 1878; 148 years ago
- Closed: December 4, 1938; 87 years ago

Former services
Preceding station	Interborough Rapid Transit	Following station
Franklin Street toward 155th Street	Sixth Avenue	Park Place toward South Ferry
Location

The Chambers Street station was a station on the demolished IRT Sixth Avenue Line in Manhattan, New York City. It had two tracks and two side platforms. It was served by trains from the IRT Sixth Avenue Line and opened on June 5, 1878. It closed on December 4, 1938. The next southbound stop was Park Place. The next northbound stop was Franklin Street. The Chambers Street – World Trade Center / Park Place station complex can be found within the vicinity of the former elevated railroad station.
