= 53rd Street and Eighth Avenue station =

Former Manhattan Railway elevated station (closed 1938)

53rd St. & 8th Ave.

General information
- Location: 8th Avenue and West 53rd Street; New York, NY; Upper Manhattan, Manhattan
- Coordinates: 40°45′50.94″N 73°59′5.1″W
- System: Former Manhattan Railway elevated station
- Operator: Interborough Rapid Transit Company
- Line: Sixth Avenue Line
- Platforms: 2 side platforms
- Tracks: 3

Construction
- Structure type: Elevated

History
- Opened: June 5, 1881; 145 years ago
- Closed: December 4, 1938; 87 years ago

Former services
Preceding station	Interborough Rapid Transit	Following station
59th Street toward 155th Street	Sixth Avenue	50th Street toward South Ferry
Location

The 53rd Street and Eighth Avenue station was a station on the demolished IRT Sixth Avenue Line in Manhattan, New York City. It was built in 1881 by the Manhattan Railway Company as part of an effort to connect the northern end of the Sixth Avenue Line to the Ninth Avenue Line. It had three tracks and two side platforms, and was served by trains from the IRT Sixth Avenue Line. As a result, it became the last station on the Sixth Avenue Line before merging at a sharp curve with the Ninth Avenue Line. On September 11, 1905, 12 people were killed and 42 injured when a train jumped over the rails at the curve on 53rd Street between the Ninth Avenue 50th Street and 59th Street stations. In 1932, the Independent Subway System built the 50th Street Station three blocks to the south on the Eighth Avenue Subway with an additional lower level in 1933, thus rendering the elevated station and line obsolete. It closed on December 4, 1938. The next southbound stop was 50th Street. The next northbound stop was 59th Street.
