= 18th Street station (IRT Sixth Avenue Line) =

Former Manhattan Railway elevated station (closed 1954)

18th St.

General information
- Location: West 18th Street and 6th Avenue; New York, NY; Midtown Manhattan, Manhattan
- Coordinates: 40°44′23.44″N 73°59′42.14″W
- System: Former Manhattan Railway elevated station
- Operator: Interborough Rapid Transit Company
- Line: Sixth Avenue Line
- Platforms: 2 side platforms
- Tracks: 2

Construction
- Structure type: Elevated

History
- Opened: June 5, 1892; 134 years ago
- Closed: December 4, 1938; 87 years ago

Former services
Preceding station	Interborough Rapid Transit	Following station
23rd Street toward 155th Street	Sixth Avenue	14th Street toward South Ferry
Location

The 18th Street station was a station on the demolished IRT Sixth Avenue Line in Manhattan, New York City. It had two tracks and two side platforms. It was served by trains from the IRT Sixth Avenue Line and opened in 1892. It closed on December 4, 1938, and was not replaced with a subway station on the IND Sixth Avenue Line. However, one block north of the station there was a 19th Street station on the Hudson and Manhattan Railroad that operated between 1908 and 1954. The next southbound stop was 14th Street. The next northbound stop was 23rd Street.
