= Park Place station (IRT Sixth Avenue Line) =

Former Manhattan Railway elevated station (closed 1938)

Park Place
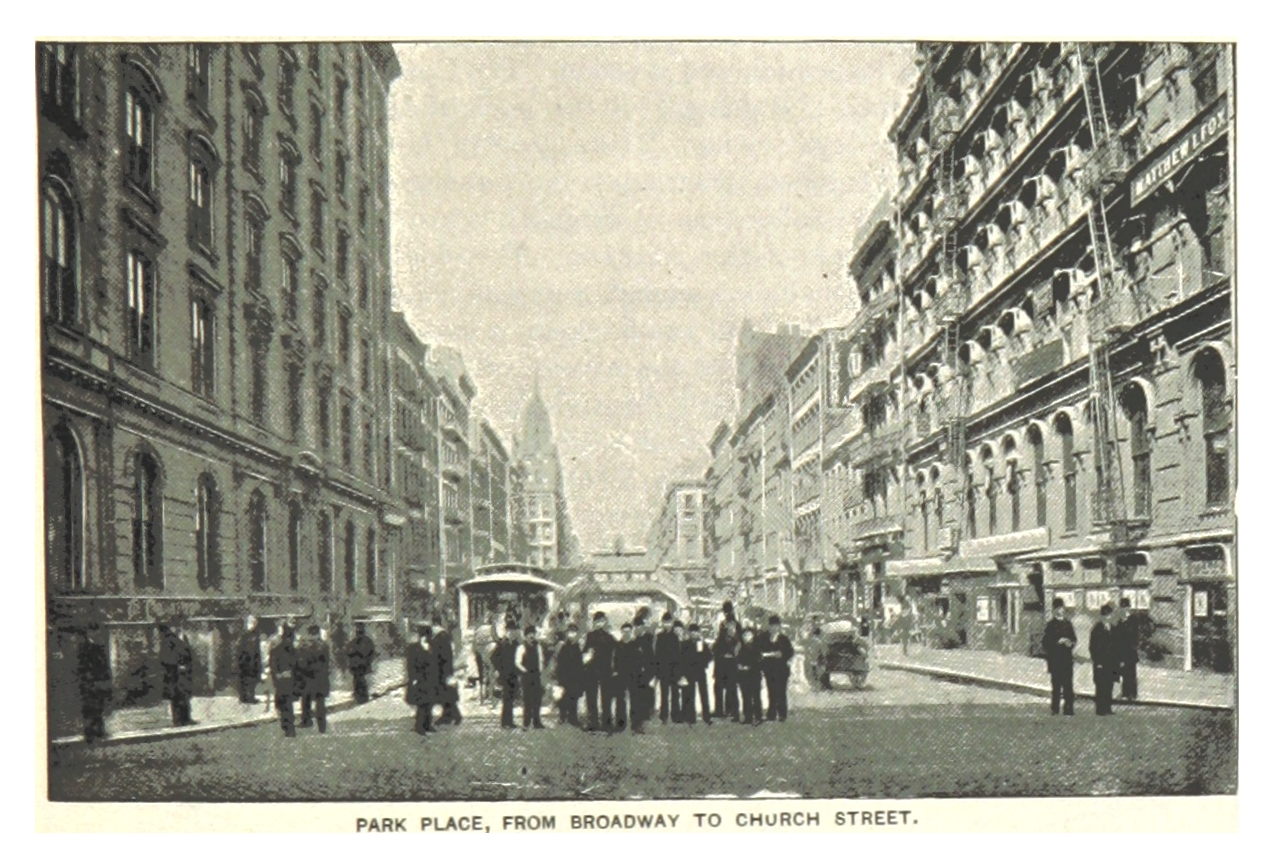
- Park Place in 1893

General information
- Location: Church Street and Park Place; New York, NY; Lower Manhattan, Manhattan
- Coordinates: 40°42′47.55″N 74°0′33.43″W
- System: Former Manhattan Railway elevated station
- Operator: Interborough Rapid Transit Company
- Line: Sixth Avenue Line
- Platforms: 2 side platforms
- Tracks: 2

Construction
- Structure type: Elevated

History
- Opened: June 5, 1878; 148 years ago
- Closed: December 4, 1938; 87 years ago

Former services
Preceding station	Interborough Rapid Transit	Following station
Chambers Street toward 155th Street	Sixth Avenue	Cortlandt Street toward South Ferry
Location

The Park Place station was a station on the demolished IRT Sixth Avenue Line in Manhattan, New York City. It had 2 tracks and two side platforms. It was served by trains from the IRT Sixth Avenue Line and opened on June 5, 1878. It closed on December 4, 1938. The next southbound stop was Cortlandt Street for local trains, and Battery Place for express trains. The next northbound stop was Chambers Street for all trains. The Chambers Street – World Trade Center / Park Place station complex can be found within the vicinity of the former elevated railroad station.
