= Eighth Street station =

8th Street station or Eighth Street station may refer to:

- 8th Street station (Charlotte), a streetcar station in Charlotte, North Carolina
- 8th Street station (DC Streetcar), a light rail stop in Washington, D.C.
- 8th Street station (Hudson–Bergen Light Rail), a light rail station in Bayonne, New Jersey
- 8th Street station (San Diego Trolley), a light rail station in San Diego, California
- 8th–Market station, a subway station in Philadelphia, Pennsylvania
- 8 Street Southwest station, a light rail station in Calgary, Alberta, Canada
- Eighth Street station (IRT Second Avenue Line), a demolished elevated station in New York City, New York
- Eighth Street station (IRT Sixth Avenue Line), a demolished elevated station in New York City, New York
- Eighth Street–New York University station, a subway station in New York City, New York
- Brickell City Centre station, a people mover station in Miami, Florida, known as Eighth Street station
- West Eighth Street–New York Aquarium station, a subway station in Brooklyn, New York

== See also ==
- Eighth Street (disambiguation)
- South Eighth Street station
