= 28th Street station =

28th Street station may refer to the following New York City Subway stations in Manhattan:

- 28th Street station (IRT Broadway–Seventh Avenue Line)
- 28th Street station (IRT Lexington Avenue Line)
- 28th Street station (BMT Broadway Line)
- 28th Street station (IRT Third Avenue Line), 1878–1955
- 28th Street station (IRT Sixth Avenue Line), 1892–1938
