= Rector Street station (IRT Ninth Avenue Line) =

Former Manhattan Railway elevated station (closed 1940)

Rector St.

General information
- Location: Rector Street and Greenwich Street; New York, NY; Lower Manhattan, Manhattan
- Coordinates: 40°42′28.54″N 74°0′49.06″W
- System: Former Manhattan Railway elevated station
- Operator: Interborough Rapid Transit Company
- Line: Ninth Avenue Line
- Platforms: 2 side platforms
- Tracks: 2

Construction
- Structure type: Elevated

History
- Opened: May 25, 1874; 152 years ago
- Closed: June 11, 1940; 86 years ago

Former services
Preceding station	Interborough Rapid Transit	Following station
Cortlandt Street toward Burnside Avenue	Ninth Avenue Express	Terminus
Cortlandt Street toward 155th Street	Ninth Avenue Local	Battery Place toward South Ferry
Location

The Rector Street station was a station on the demolished IRT Ninth Avenue Line in Manhattan, New York City. It was built in 1874, and had two tracks and two side platforms, though two additional tracks ended at a bumper just south of the station. It was served by trains from the IRT Ninth Avenue Line, and was one block west of Rector Street El Station on the IRT Sixth Avenue Line. In 1918, the IRT extended what is today known as the Broadway–Seventh Avenue Line from Times Square down to South Ferry and built their own Rector Street station as one of the stations, serving as competition for the Ninth Avenue Line station. The el station closed on June 11, 1940. The next southbound stop was Battery Place. The next northbound stop was Cortlandt Street for Ninth Avenue Line trains.
