= Battery Place station =

Former Manhattan Railway elevated station (closed 1940)

Battery Place

General information
- Location: Battery Place; New York, NY; Lower Manhattan, Manhattan
- Coordinates: 40°42′16.37″N 74°0′54.02″W
- System: Former Manhattan Railway elevated station
- Operator: Interborough Rapid Transit Company
- Lines: Sixth Avenue Line; Ninth Avenue Line
- Platforms: 2 side platforms
- Tracks: 2

Construction
- Structure type: Elevated

History
- Opened: June 5, 1883; 143 years ago
- Closed: June 11, 1940; 86 years ago

Former services
Preceding station	Interborough Rapid Transit	Following station
Rector Street (Trinity Place) toward 155th Street	Sixth Avenue	South Ferry Terminus
Rector Street (Greenwich Street) toward 155th Street	Ninth Avenue Local	South Ferry Terminus
Location

The Battery Place station was a station on the demolished Ninth Avenue and Sixth Avenue elevated train lines in Manhattan, New York City. It was located at the southern terminus of Greenwich Street at the north end of Battery Park.

The station had two tracks and two side platforms. It was served by trains from the IRT Sixth Avenue Line and IRT Ninth Avenue Line. It opened June 5, 1883. One block north of the station, the Sixth Avenue El diverged to the east at Morris Street. It closed on June 11, 1940, though Sixth Avenue line trains stopped serving it when that elevated line was closed in 1938.

The next southbound stop was South Ferry. The next northbound stops were Rector Street for Ninth Avenue Line trains (which replaced the earlier Morris Street station), Rector Street for local Sixth Avenue Line trains, and Park Place for Sixth Avenue Line express trains.
