= Cortlandt Street station (IRT Sixth Avenue Line) =

Former Manhattan Railway elevated station (closed 1938)

Cortlandt St.
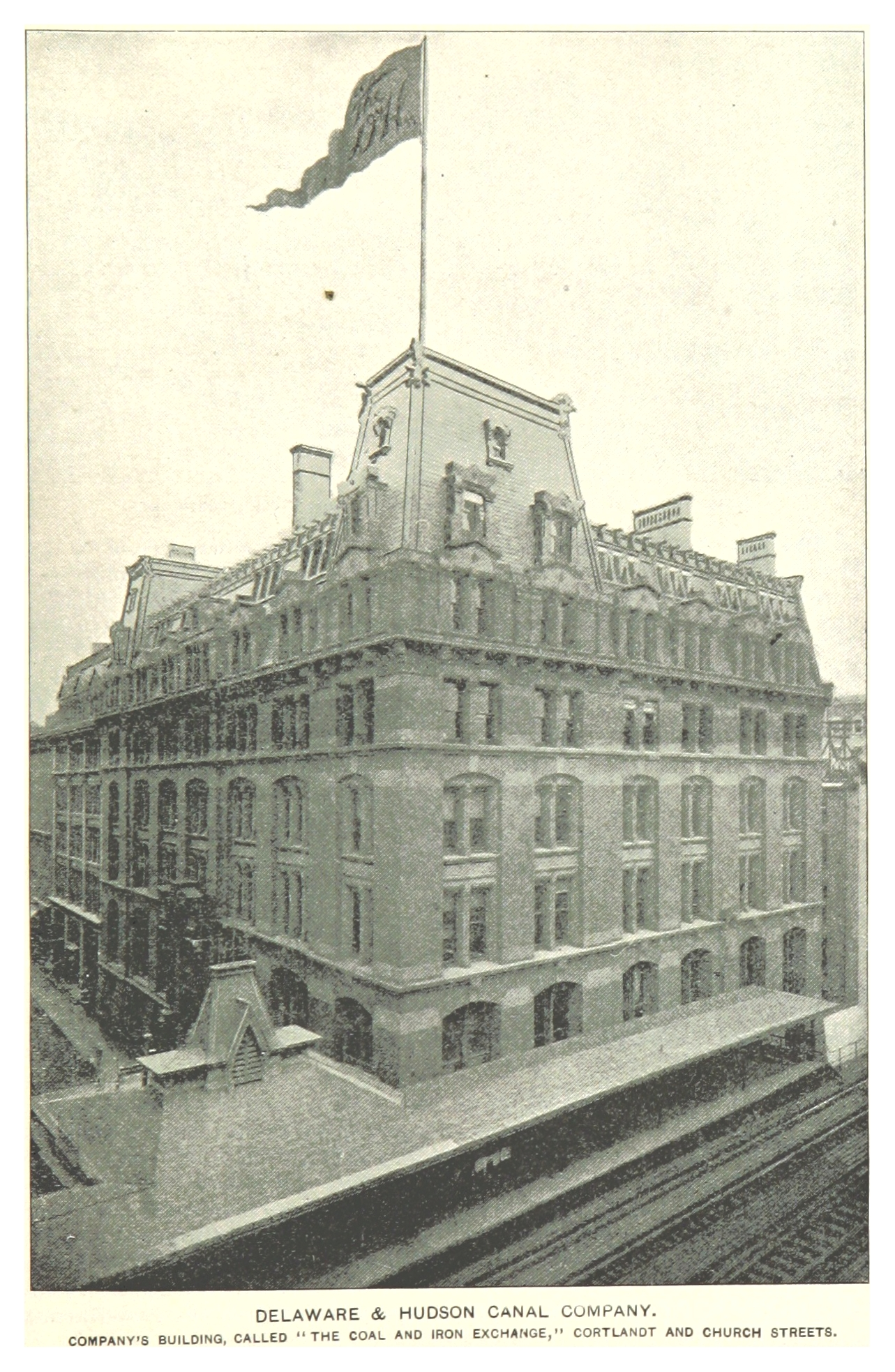
- The station platform ca. 1893

General information
- Location: Cortlandt Street and Church Street; New York, NY; Lower Manhattan, Manhattan
- Coordinates: 40°42′37.3″N 74°0′40.46″W
- System: Former Manhattan Railway elevated station
- Operator: Interborough Rapid Transit Company
- Line: Sixth Avenue Line
- Platforms: 2 side platforms
- Tracks: 3

Construction
- Structure type: Elevated

History
- Opened: June 5, 1878; 148 years ago
- Closed: December 4, 1938; 87 years ago

Former services
| Preceding station | Interborough Rapid Transit | Following station |
|---|---|---|
| Park Place toward 155th Street | Sixth Avenue | Rector Street toward South Ferry |
Location

The Cortlandt Street station was a station at Church Street on the demolished IRT Sixth Avenue Line in Manhattan, New York City. It had 3 tracks and two side platforms. It was served by trains from the IRT Sixth Avenue Line and opened on June 5, 1878. It closed on December 4, 1938. The next southbound stop was Rector Street. The next northbound stop was Park Place.

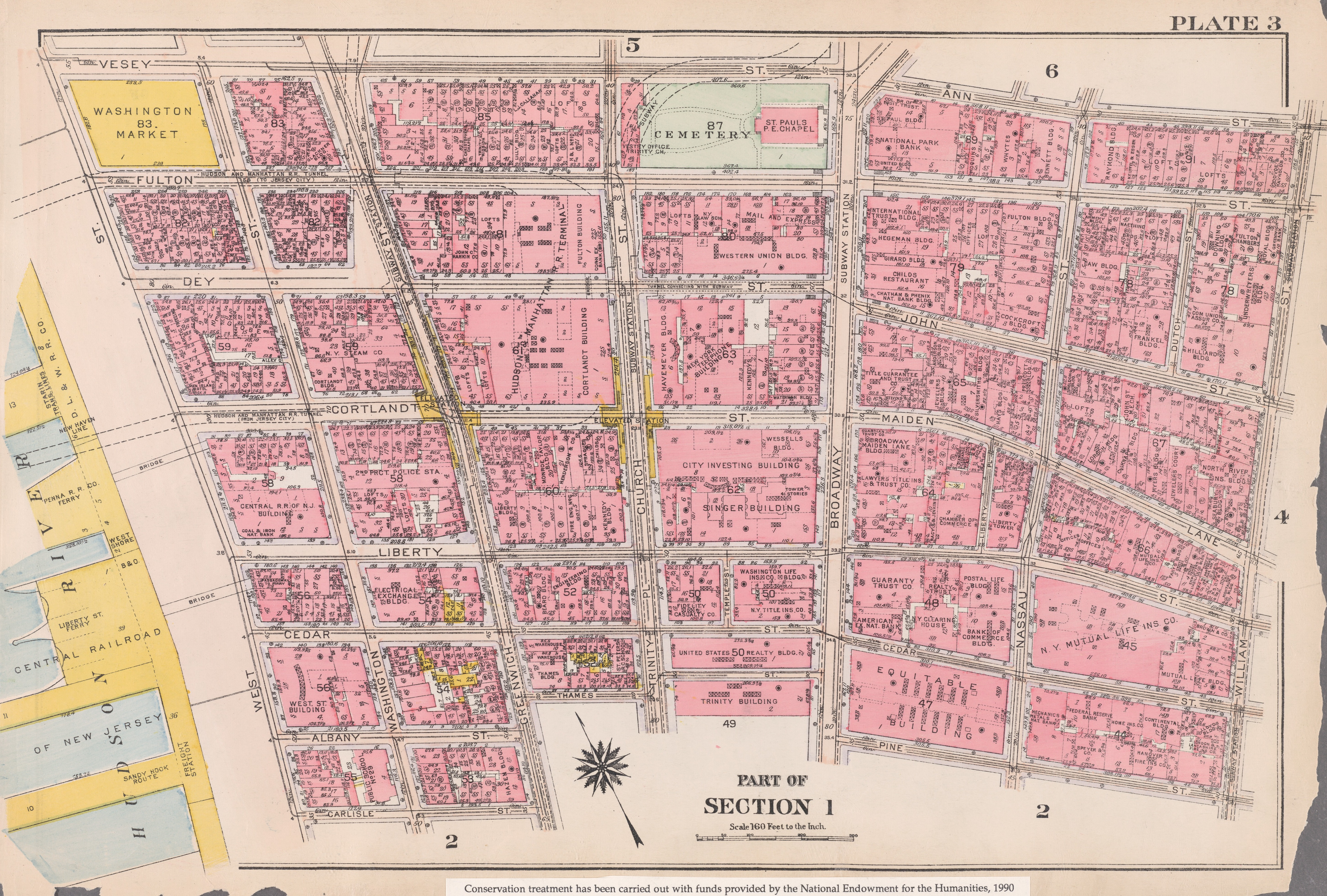
Cortlandt Street station on a map published in 1916
