= Rector Street station (IRT Sixth Avenue Line) =

Former Manhattan Railway elevated station (closed 1938)

Rector St.

General information
- Location: Rector Street and Trinity Place; New York, NY; Lower Manhattan, Manhattan
- Coordinates: 40°42′27.87″N 74°0′46.8″W
- System: Former Manhattan Railway elevated station
- Operator: Interborough Rapid Transit Company
- Line: Sixth Avenue Line
- Platforms: 2 side platforms
- Tracks: 3

Construction
- Structure type: Elevated

History
- Opened: June 5, 1878; 148 years ago
- Closed: December 4, 1938; 87 years ago

Former services
Preceding station	Interborough Rapid Transit	Following station
Cortlandt Street toward 155th Street	Sixth Avenue	Battery Place toward South Ferry
Location

The Rector Street station was on the demolished IRT Sixth Avenue Line in Manhattan, New York City. It had three tracks and two side platforms. It opened on June 5, 1878, served by trains from the IRT Sixth Avenue Line, and was one block east of Rector Street El Station on the IRT Ninth Avenue Line. In 1918, Brooklyn Rapid Transit Company built the Broadway Subway through Manhattan and added a station at Rector Street, which served as competition for the 6th Avenue Line station. The el station closed on December 4, 1938. The next southbound stop was Battery Place on the IRT Ninth Avenue Line. The next northbound stop was Cortlandt Street.
