= 33rd Street station (IRT Sixth Avenue Line) =

Former Manhattan Railway elevated station (closed 1938)

33rd St.
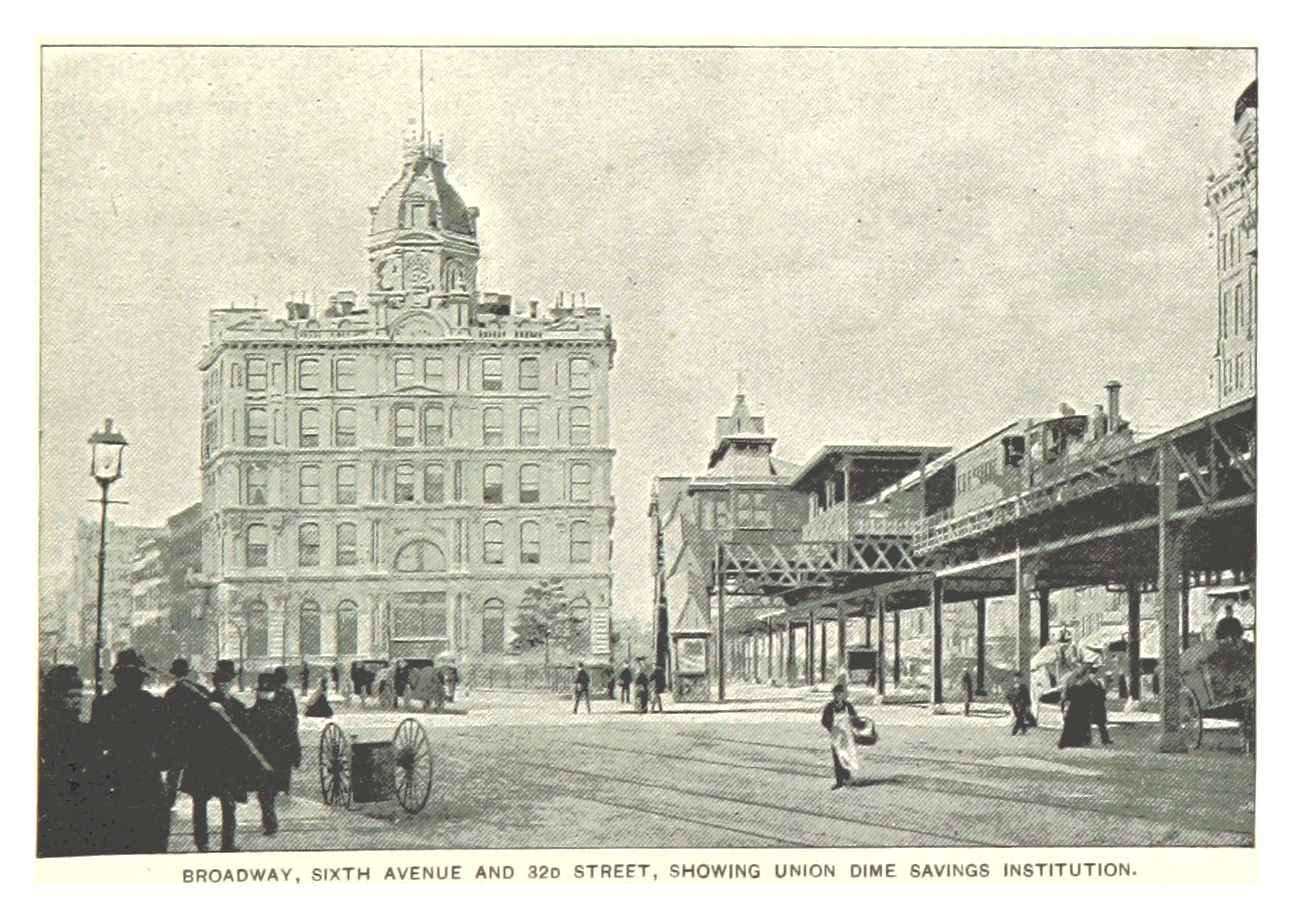
- 1893 view from 32nd Street when steam engines still used the line

General information
- Location: West 33rd Street and 6th Avenue; New York, NY; Midtown Manhattan, Manhattan
- Coordinates: 40°44′56.01″N 73°59′18.5″W
- System: Former Manhattan Railway elevated station
- Operator: Interborough Rapid Transit Company
- Line: Sixth Avenue Line
- Platforms: 2 side platforms
- Tracks: 2

Construction
- Structure type: Elevated

History
- Opened: June 5, 1878; 148 years ago
- Closed: December 4, 1938; 87 years ago

Former services
Preceding station	Interborough Rapid Transit	Following station
38th Street toward 155th Street	Sixth Avenue	28th Street toward South Ferry
Location

The 33rd Street station was a station on the demolished IRT Sixth Avenue Line in Manhattan, New York City. It had two tracks and two side platforms. It was served by trains from the IRT Sixth Avenue Line. This station opened on June 5, 1878, and closed on December 4, 1938. The next southbound stop was 28th Street. The next northbound stop was 38th Street. The station was eventually replaced by the 34th Street–Herald Square Subway station complex one block north.

== Gallery ==
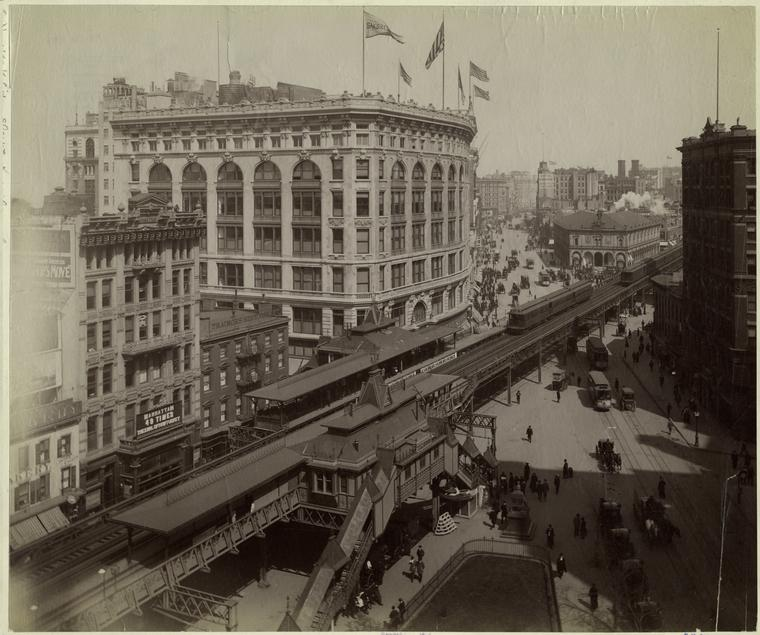
Aerial view
