= Eighth Avenue =

Eighth Avenue, Eighth Avenue station or 8 Av may refer to:

== Roads ==
- Islamabad Highway or 8th Avenue, a main highway in and near Islamabad, Pakistan
- Eighth Avenue (Manhattan)
- Eighth Avenue (Brooklyn)

== Subway stations ==
- Eighth Avenue station (BMT Canarsie Line), a station at 14th Street in Manhattan
- Eighth Avenue station (BMT Sea Beach Line), a station at 62nd Street in Brooklyn
- Eighth Avenue station (IRT Sixth Avenue Line), a former station at 53rd Street in Manhattan

== Transit lines ==
- IND Eighth Avenue Line, a rapid transit line in Manhattan
- Eighth Avenue Line (Manhattan surface) or M10 and M20 buses
- Eighth Avenue Line (Brooklyn surface), a bus line, formerly a streetcar line in Brooklyn

== Other uses ==
- 8 Av, the eighth day of Av, the fifth month of the Hebrew calendar

== See also ==
- Eighth Avenue Place (Calgary)
- Eighth Street (disambiguation)
