= 23rd Street station (IRT Sixth Avenue Line) =

Former Manhattan Railway elevated station (closed 1938)

23rd St.
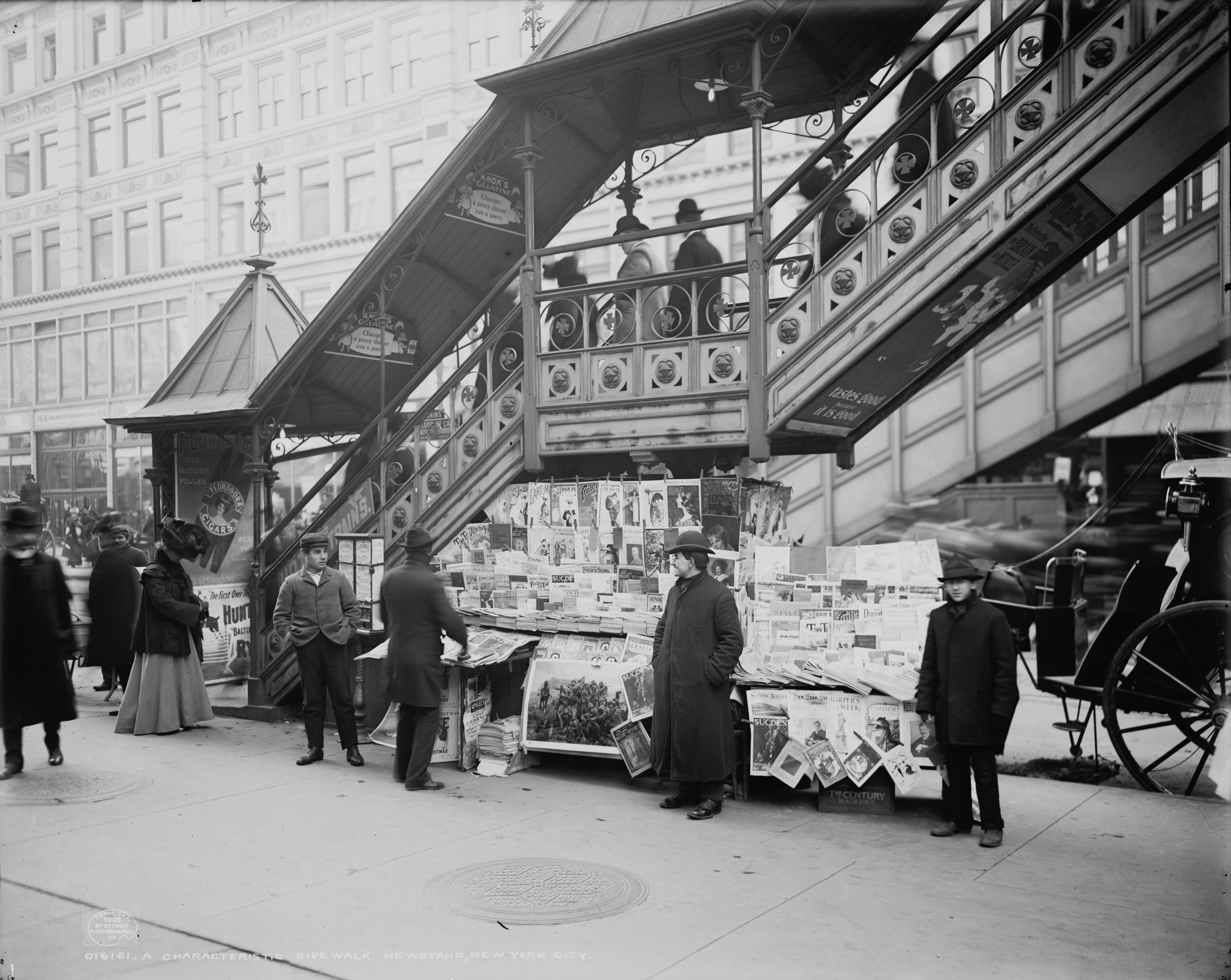
- A newsstand beneath one of the entrances to 23rd Street station in December 1902.

General information
- Location: West 23rd Street and 6th Avenue; New York, NY; Midtown Manhattan, Manhattan
- Coordinates: 40°44′34.35″N 73°59′34.14″W
- System: Former Manhattan Railway elevated station
- Operator: Interborough Rapid Transit Company
- Line: Sixth Avenue Line
- Platforms: 2 side platforms
- Tracks: 2

Construction
- Structure type: Elevated

History
- Opened: June 5, 1878; 148 years ago
- Closed: December 4, 1938; 87 years ago

Former services
Preceding station	Interborough Rapid Transit	Following station
28th Street toward 155th Street	Sixth Avenue	18th Street toward South Ferry
Location

The 23rd Street station was a station on the demolished IRT Sixth Avenue Line in Manhattan, New York City. It had two tracks and two side platforms. It was served by trains from the IRT Sixth Avenue Line. This station opened on June 5, 1878 and closed on December 4, 1938. The next southbound stop was 18th Street. The next northbound stop was 28th Street. Two years later, the rapid transit needs of the intersection were replaced by the underground 23rd Street IND subway station.
