= Cortlandt Street =

Cortlandt Street may refer to:

== Streets ==
- Cortlandt Street (Manhattan), street in Lower Manhattan, most of which became part of the World Trade Center in the 1970s

== Subway stations ==
- Cortlandt Street (BMT Broadway Line), a New York City Subway station served by the N, R, and W trains
- WTC Cortlandt (IRT Broadway–Seventh Avenue Line) (formerly Cortlandt Street), a New York City Subway station serving the 1 train
- Cortlandt Street (IRT Ninth Avenue Line), a station on the demolished IRT Ninth Avenue Line
- Cortlandt Street (IRT Sixth Avenue Line), a station on the demolished IRT Sixth Avenue Line

== See also ==
- Cortlandt Alley, street in Lower Manhattan
