= 38th Street station =

38th Street station may refer to:

- 38th Street station (Metro Transit), a station on the Hiawatha Line in Minneapolis. Minnesota, USA
- 38th Street/Washington station, a station on the METRO Light Rail in Phoenix, Arizona, USA
- 38th Street (IRT Sixth Avenue Line), a demolished elevated station in New York City.
