= Franklin Street station (IRT Sixth Avenue Line) =

Former Manhattan Railway elevated station (closed 1938)

Franklin St.

General information
- Location: Franklin Street and West Broadway; New York, NY; Lower Manhattan, Manhattan
- Coordinates: 40°43′8.16″N 74°0′23.54″W
- System: Former Manhattan Railway elevated station
- Operator: Interborough Rapid Transit Company
- Line: Sixth Avenue Line
- Platforms: 2 side platforms
- Tracks: 2

Construction
- Structure type: Elevated

History
- Opened: June 5, 1878; 148 years ago
- Closed: December 4, 1938; 87 years ago

Former services
Preceding station	Interborough Rapid Transit	Following station
Grand Street toward 155th Street	Sixth Avenue	Chambers Street toward South Ferry
Location

The Franklin Street station was a station on the demolished IRT Sixth Avenue Line in Manhattan, New York City. It was located at Franklin Street and West Broadway, and it had two tracks and two side platforms. There was space for two additional tracks in the station. South of the station there are two additional tracks that served to layup trains.

== History ==
The station opened on June 5, 1878 as part of a line along Trinity Place, Church Avenue, West Broadway, and Sixth Avenue between Rector Street and 58th Street. The line was built by the Gilbert Elevated Railway Company, which would later come to be known as the Metropolitan Elevated Railway Company.

The station closed on December 4, 1938, with the rest of the Sixth Avenue Elevated. The Franklin Street station on the IRT Broadway–Seventh Avenue Line is the closest subway station to serve as a replacement.
