= 14th Street station (IRT Sixth Avenue Line) =

Former Manhattan Railway elevated station (closed 1938)

14th St.
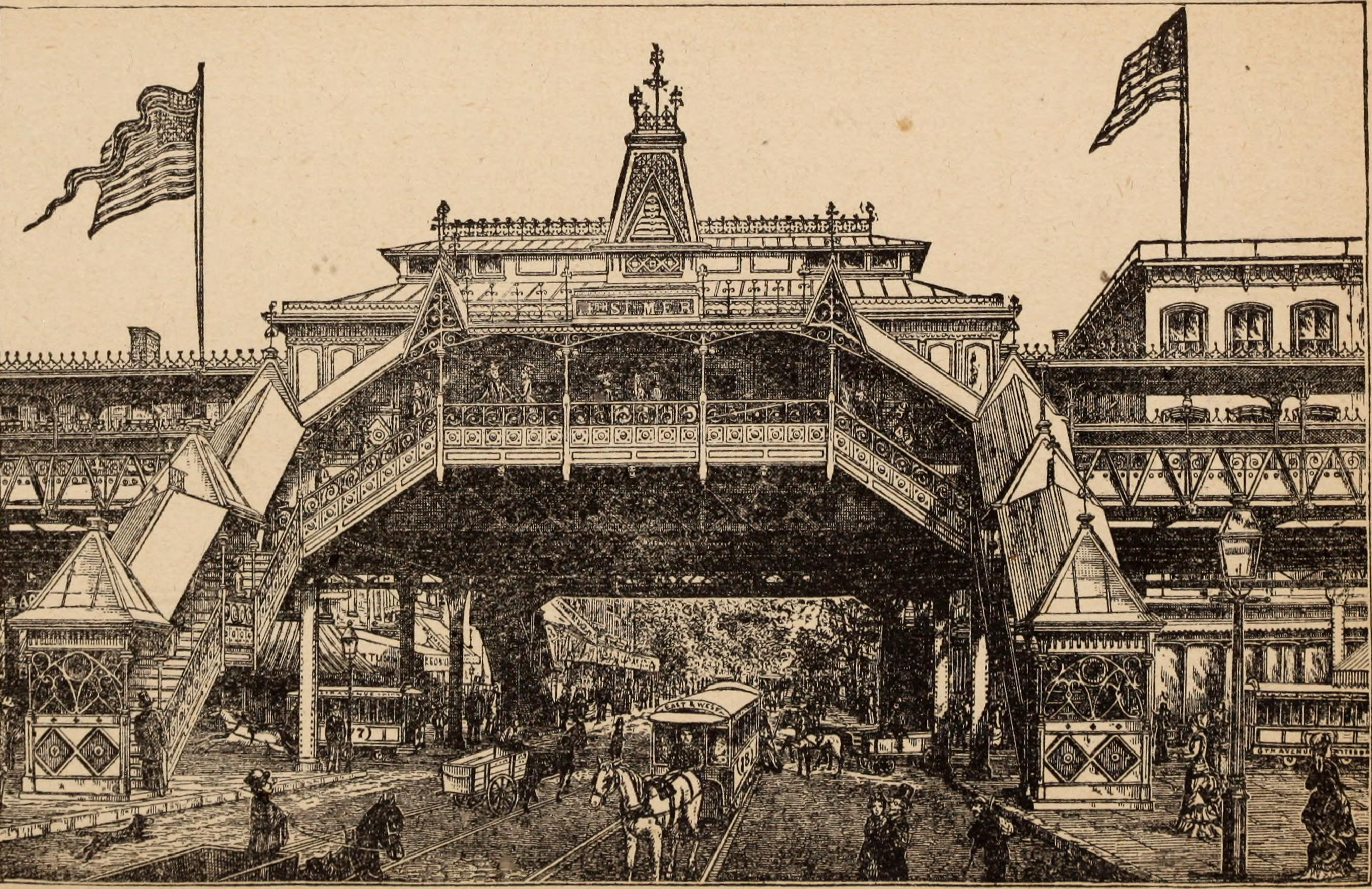
- Metropolitan Elevated Railroad station, 1882

General information
- Location: West 14th Street and 6th Avenue; Midtown Manhattan, Manhattan, New York
- Coordinates: 40°44′14″N 73°59′49″W
- System: Former Manhattan Railway elevated station
- Operator: Interborough Rapid Transit Company
- Line: Sixth Avenue Line
- Platforms: 2 side platforms
- Tracks: 2

History
- Opened: June 5, 1878; 148 years ago
- Closed: December 4, 1938; 87 years ago

Former services
Preceding station	Interborough Rapid Transit	Following station
18th Street toward 155th Street	Sixth Avenue	Eighth Street toward South Ferry
Location

The 14th Street station was a station on the demolished IRT Sixth Avenue Line in Manhattan, New York City. It had two tracks and two side platforms, and was served by trains from the IRT Sixth Avenue Line. The station opened on June 5, 1878, and was designed by famed Hudson River School painter Jasper Francis Cropsey, a trained architect. Beginning in 1907, the station had a connection to the 14th Street subway station of the Hudson and Manhattan Railroad. It closed on December 4, 1938. The next southbound stop was Eighth Street. The next northbound stop was 18th Street. Two years later the station was replaced by the IND Sixth Avenue Line platforms of the 14th Street / Sixth Avenue Subway station complex.
