= Grand Avenue =

Grand Avenue may refer to:

== Places ==
=== Roadways ===
- Grand Avenue (Chicago), Illinois
- Grand Avenue (Los Angeles), California
- Grand Avenue (Phoenix), Arizona
- Grand Avenue (Queens), New York

=== Other places ===
- Grand Avenue Project, a redevelopment project along Grand Avenue in Los Angeles
- Shops of Grand Avenue, a shopping mall in downtown Milwaukee, Wisconsin

== Arts, entertainment, and media ==
- Grand Avenue (band), a Danish rock band
- Grand Avenue, a comic strip written by Steve Breen
- Grand Avenue (film), a 1996 American drama film

== New York City Subway ==
- Grand Avenue (BMT Fulton Street Line), demolished
- Grand Avenue (BMT Myrtle Avenue Line), demolished
- Grand Avenue–Newtown (IND Queens Boulevard Line), serving the M R trains

== See also ==
- Grand Boulevard (disambiguation)
- Grand Street (disambiguation)
