= Grand Street station (IRT Sixth Avenue Line) =

Former Manhattan Railway elevated station (closed 1938)

Grand St.

General information
- Location: Grand Street and West Broadway; New York, NY; Lower Manhattan, Manhattan
- Coordinates: 40°43′20.57″N 74°0′13.58″W
- System: Former Manhattan Railway elevated station
- Operator: Interborough Rapid Transit Company
- Line: Sixth Avenue Line
- Platforms: 2 side platforms
- Tracks: 2

Construction
- Structure type: Elevated

History
- Opened: June 5, 1878; 148 years ago
- Closed: December 4, 1938; 87 years ago

Former services
| Preceding station | Interborough Rapid Transit | Following station |
|---|---|---|
| Bleecker Street toward 155th Street | Sixth Avenue | Franklin Street toward South Ferry |
Location

The Grand Street station was a station on the demolished IRT Sixth Avenue Line in Manhattan, New York City. It had two tracks and two side platforms. It was served by trains from the IRT Sixth Avenue Line and opened on June 5, 1878. It closed on December 4, 1938. The next southbound stop was Franklin Street. The next northbound stop was Bleecker Street.
