= 42nd Street station (IRT Ninth Avenue Line) =

Former Manhattan Railway elevated station (closed 1940)

42nd St.
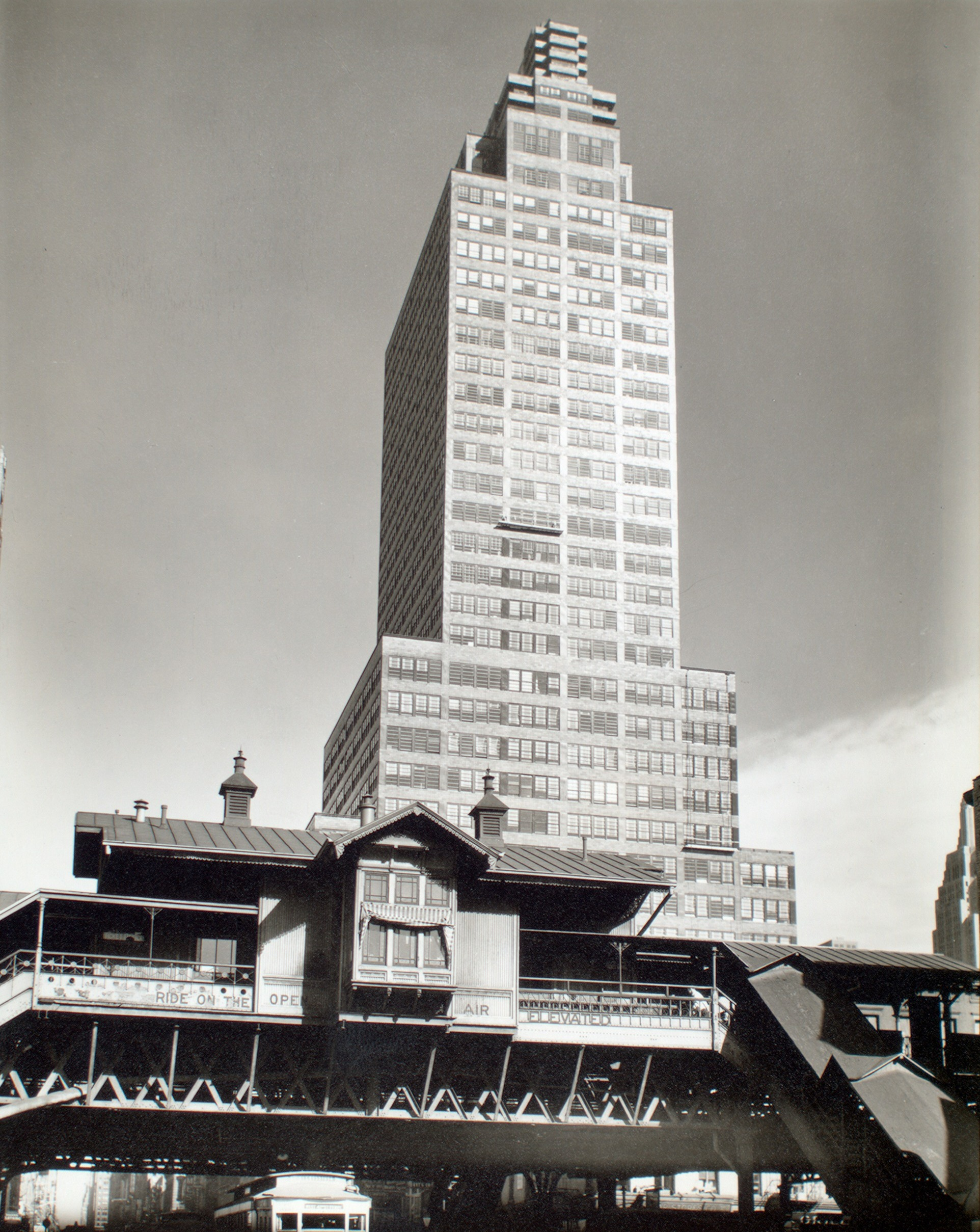
- The 42nd Street station in 1936, with the McGraw Hill Building in the background

General information
- Location: West 42nd Street and 9th Avenue; New York, NY; Midtown Manhattan, Manhattan
- Coordinates: 40°45′30.34″N 73°59′33.47″W
- System: Former Manhattan Railway elevated station
- Operator: Interborough Rapid Transit Company
- Line: Ninth Avenue Line
- Platforms: 2 side platforms
- Tracks: 3 (1 upper level; 2 lower level)

Construction
- Structure type: Elevated

History
- Opened: November 6, 1875; 151 years ago
- Closed: June 11, 1940; 86 years ago

Former services
Preceding station	Interborough Rapid Transit	Following station
50th Street toward 155th Street	Ninth Avenue Local	34th Street toward South Ferry
Location

The 42nd Street station was a local station on the demolished IRT Ninth Avenue Line in Manhattan, New York City. It was opened on November 6, 1875, and had two levels. On the lower level, the local trains stopped, on two tracks serving two side platforms. The upper level was built as part of the Dual Contracts and had one track which carried express trains bypassing the station. The next northbound stop was 50th Street. The next southbound stop was 34th Street. The station was closed on June 11, 1940.
