= 42nd Street station (IRT Sixth Avenue Line) =

Former Manhattan Railway elevated station (closed 1938)

42nd St.
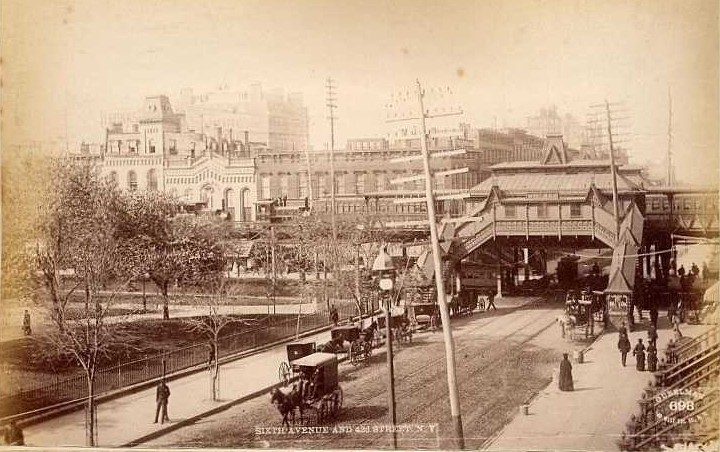
- The 42nd street station c. 1879

General information
- Location: West 42nd Street and 6th Avenue; New York, NY; Midtown Manhattan, Manhattan
- Coordinates: 40°45′17.45″N 73°59′2.84″W
- System: Former Manhattan Railway elevated station
- Operator: Interborough Rapid Transit Company
- Line: Sixth Avenue Line
- Platforms: 2 side platforms
- Tracks: 2

Construction
- Structure type: Elevated

History
- Opened: June 5, 1878; 148 years ago
- Closed: December 4, 1938; 87 years ago

Former services
Preceding station	Interborough Rapid Transit	Following station
50th Street toward 155th Street	Sixth Avenue	38th Street toward South Ferry
Location

The 42nd Street station was a station on the demolished IRT Sixth Avenue Line in Manhattan, New York City. It had 2 tracks and two side platforms. It was served by trains from the IRT Sixth Avenue Line, and was located near sites such as the New York Public Library headquarters, Bryant Park, and the New York Hippodrome. The station opened on June 5, 1878, and closed on December 4, 1938. The next southbound stop was 38th Street. The next northbound stop was 50th Street. Two years later, the rapid transit needs of the intersection were replaced by the IND Sixth Avenue Line platforms of the 42nd Street–Bryant Park/Fifth Avenue subway station complex.
