= Grand Boulevard =

Grand Boulevard may refer to:

- Grand Boulevard (Budapest), Hungary
- Grand Boulevard, Joondalup, Australia

== United States ==
- Grand Boulevard (Corona), California, a circular street that encircles downtown Corona
- Grand Boulevard, Chicago, Illinois, a neighborhood
- Grand Boulevard (Detroit), Michigan, a boulevard that encircles central Detroit
- Grand Boulevard (Kansas City, Missouri)
- Grand Boulevard (St. Louis), Missouri
- Grand Concourse (Bronx), New York, sometimes called Grand Boulevard and Concourse
- Southern Parkway (Louisville, Kentucky), formerly called Grand Boulevard

== See also ==
- Grand Avenue (disambiguation)
- Grand Street (disambiguation)
