= Frank K. Hain =

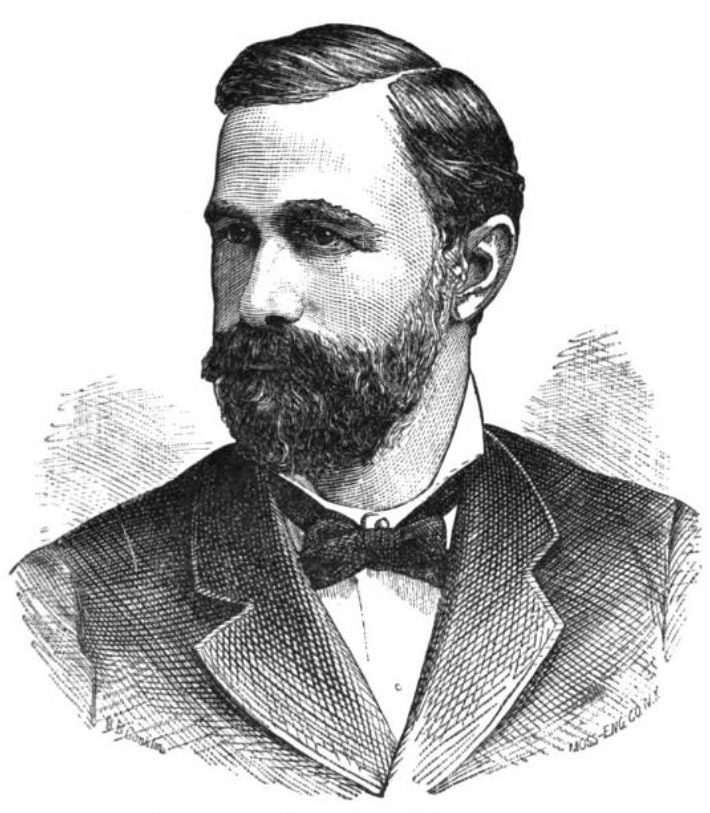
- Born: Franklin Kintzel Hain; July 22, 1836; Stouchsburg, Pennsylvania
- Died: May 9, 1896 (aged 59); Clifton Springs, New York
- Occupation: Railroad executive
- Spouse: Annie McWilliams (m. 1861)

Franklin Kintzel Hain (July 22, 1836 – May 9, 1896), often called "Colonel Hain" during his lifetime, was the general manager of the Manhattan Railway Company from 1880 until his death.

Hain showed increasing signs of nervous breakdown in his last two years on the job, and finally took a vacation in Washington, D.C., and Virginia early in 1896. On his doctor's insistence, he was then persuaded to enter Clifton Springs Sanitarium in Western New York for a complete rest. His wife accompanied him and reported that he appeared to be recovering well, but on May 9 he took his life by crawling under a New York Central freight train. An editorial in The New York Times three days later called it "a martyrdom to duty."

== Early life and career before New York ==
Hain was the eldest of five children of Pennsylvania German parents, Samuel Hain and Margaret Fitzenberger Kintzel. He was born in Stouchsburg, where he was educated at Tulpehocken Academy. Around 1850, the family moved to Reading, where he started work at 17 in 1853 as an apprentice machinist with the Philadelphia and Reading Railroad.

He left in 1857 to join the Navy as an assistant engineer, and served aboard USS Colorado from January to August 1858. He then returned to Pennsylvania and opened a leather business in Danville.

The month after the outbreak of the Civil War, in May 1861, Hain re-enlisted in the Union Navy. He served aboard USS Iroquois until she was decommissioned in October 1862; he was then assigned to USS Sangamon but because of persistent ill health—during his time on the Iroquois he had been in sickbay for adynamia, diarrhea, and malaria and also been wounded—he did not join the ship and his resignation was accepted in January 1863.

In 1863–64, he worked as a draftsman for the Delaware, Lackawanna and Western Railroad in Scranton. During this time he also served for about a month as a captain in the Pennsylvania Infantry Militia, commanding 102 men; his nickname of "Colonel" dates from this service, although he never held that rank or, apparently, saw action. In March 1864, he became a master mechanic for the Philadelphia and Erie Railroad; on January 1, 1865, he was promoted to superintendent of motive power.

Two years later, in January 1867, he became a lead draftsman at the Baldwin Locomotive Works in Philadelphia, where he lived in company housing with his brother George, who was a foreman machinist. The company used a system of standardized interchangeable parts to design locomotives to fit the needs of a variety of customers, many foreign; Hain was responsible for designing the first anthracite-burning locomotives for Russia, and traveled there in 1871 to meet with government representatives.

He then became Supervisor of the Susquehanna Depot of the Erie Railroad from 1874 to 1876, and general superintendent and purchasing agent for the Keokuk & Des Moines Railroad, then following its purchase by the Rock Island Railroad, superintendent of the Keokuk & Des Moines division of the Rock Island Railroad. In 1880, after the railroad changed its name to the Chicago, Rock Island and Pacific Railroad, he accepted an offer from Jay Gould—a board member of the Rock Island Railroad and former president of the Erie Railroad—to become general manager of the Manhattan Railway Company.

== General Manager of the Manhattan Railway Company ==
Hain was first master mechanic and then general manager of the Manhattan Railway Company, which operated the elevated lines in Manhattan and the Bronx, from March 1880 until his death; in 1891 he became second vice-president. Despite financial difficulties so severe that the company was in receivership for three months in 1881, and continuing problems with labor unions, he succeeded in cutting costs and making the company profitable. Although no passengers were killed on the trains, there were numerous accidents that killed workers and people getting off and on, and the company was constantly attacked as mercenary and uncaring by the newspapers, especially The New York Times. Yet after his death, Hain was eulogized by the Brotherhood of Locomotive Engineers as "a true friend and almost a father" to his employees, with "a strict sense of justice in administering between his company" and them, in the Brooklyn Eagle as "regard[ing] the company [not] as a commodity or speculation, but as a public agency", and by The New York Times as chiefly responsible for the fact the elevated railroad had, "[on] the practical side", been "admirably handled", and as having been "a stranger to the stock jobbing and the litigation of its owners".

== Sickness and death ==
Hain showed increasing signs of nervous breakdown in his last two years on the job, and finally took a vacation in Washington, D.C., and Virginia early in 1896. On his doctor's insistence, he was then persuaded to enter Clifton Springs Sanitarium in Western New York for a complete rest. His wife accompanied him and reported that he appeared to be recovering well, but on May 9 he took his life by crawling under a New York Central freight train. An editorial in The New York Times three days later called it "a martyrdom to duty."

4,000 employees of the Manhattan Railway Company raised $2,500 to erect a granite monument 7 feet high and 9 feet wide at his burial place in the Presbyterian Cemetery in Danville, Pennsylvania. It was dedicated on May 26, 1897; "thousands" of railroaders, including approximately 200 from the company, attended.

== Personal life ==
Hain married Annie McWilliams of Mooresburg, Pennsylvania, on January 23, 1861. She was a suffragist and a member of the Portia Club, which advocated the appointment of a female judge; she studied law in a special women's program at New York University. In New York, they lived in the Navarro Apartments or "Spanish Flats" on 58th St. They had one child, Rebecca McWilliams Hain, born while Hain was at sea on the Iroquois; she died in 1866 aged four and a half.

Hain was convinced he was descended from the Dutch admiral Piet Pieterszoon Hein, probably incorrectly since his ancestors were from the Palatinate.
