= Calle Ocho (disambiguation) =

Calle Ocho is Spanish for Eighth Street, and is a street in Miami that is part of the Tamiami Trail.

It can also refer to:

- Calle Ocho Festival, a street fair in Miami
- "I Know You Want Me (Calle Ocho)", a 2008 song by Pitbull
- Little Havana, a Cuban-American neighborhood in Miami centered around Calle Ocho

== See also ==
- Eighth Street (disambiguation)
