= Eighth Street =

Eighth Street or 8th Street may refer to:

== Roads and bridges ==
- Eighth Street (Manhattan), a street in Manhattan, New York City
- 8th Street East (Saskatoon), a street in Saskatoon, Saskatchewan
- Calle Ocho, a street in Little Havana, Miami
- Albertus L. Meyers Bridge, also known as the Eighth Street Bridge, in Allentown, Pennsylvania
- Eighth Street Bridge (Passaic River)

== Public transportation ==
- Eighth Street station (disambiguation), train stations of the name

== Buildings ==
- Eighth Street Apartments, residence halls at Georgia Institute of Technology
- Eighth Street Elementary School, an elementary school in Ocala, Florida
- Eighth Street Middle School, a public middle school in Tifton, Georgia
- West Eighth Street Historic District, a historic district in Anderson, Indiana

== See also ==
- Eighth Avenue (disambiguation)
- Calle Ocho (disambiguation), in Spanish
