= 38th Street station (IRT Sixth Avenue Line) =

Former Manhattan Railway elevated station (closed 1938)

38th St.

General information
- Location: West 38th Street and 6th Avenue; New York, NY; Midtown Manhattan, Manhattan
- Coordinates: 40°45′8.34″N 73°59′9.48″W
- System: Former Manhattan Railway elevated station
- Operator: Interborough Rapid Transit Company
- Line: Sixth Avenue Line
- Platforms: 2 side platforms
- Tracks: 2

Construction
- Structure type: Elevated

History
- Opened: January 31, 1914; 112 years ago
- Closed: December 4, 1938; 87 years ago

Former services
Preceding station	Interborough Rapid Transit	Following station
42nd Street toward 155th Street	Sixth Avenue	33rd Street toward South Ferry
Location

The 38th Street station was a station on the demolished IRT Sixth Avenue Line in Manhattan, New York City. It had two tracks and two side platforms. It opened in late 1913, as an infill station and closed on December 4, 1938. The next southbound stop was 33rd Street. The next northbound stop was 42nd Street (the Sixth Avenue line was the only one of the elevated lines which had a station between 33rd/34th Street and 42nd Street — and none of the subway lines that replaced the els have such a station), although a now-closed passage under Sixth Avenue running between the 42nd Street–Bryant Park and 34th Street–Herald Square stations had exits to 38th Street. High crime along the passage's five-block stretch was widely cited as the reason for its closure in 1991.
