= Eighth Street station (IRT Sixth Avenue Line) =

Former Manhattan Railway elevated station (closed 1938)

Eighth St.
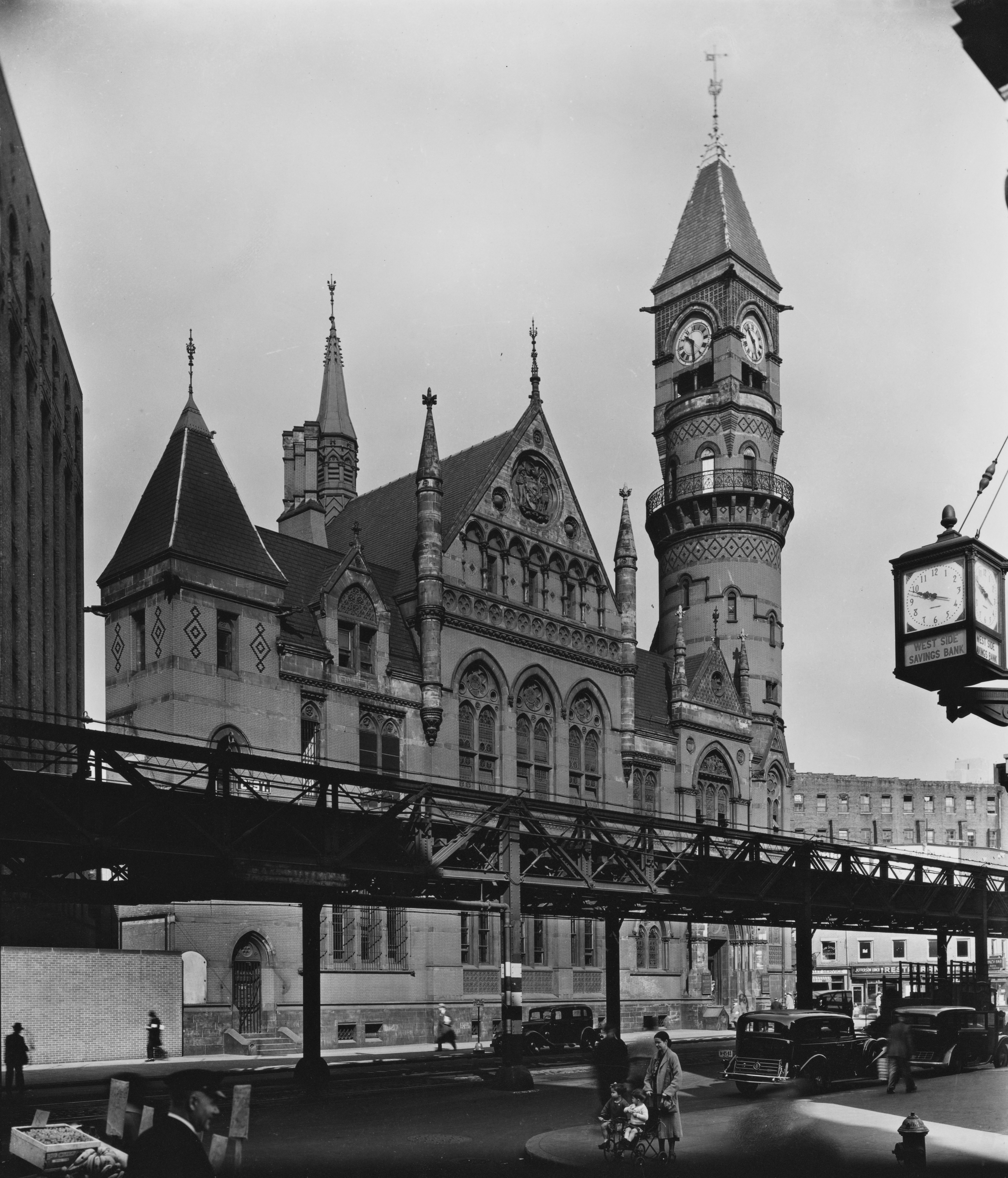
- The Jefferson Market Courthouse, just to the north of the Eighth Street station

General information
- Location: West 8th Street and 6th Avenue; New York, NY; Lower Manhattan, Manhattan
- Coordinates: 40°44′0.96″N 73°59′58.52″W
- System: Former Manhattan Railway elevated station
- Operator: Interborough Rapid Transit Company
- Line: Sixth Avenue Line
- Platforms: 2 side platforms
- Tracks: 2

Construction
- Structure type: Elevated

History
- Opened: June 5, 1878; 148 years ago
- Closed: December 4, 1938; 87 years ago

Former services
Preceding station	Interborough Rapid Transit	Following station
14th Street toward 155th Street	Sixth Avenue	Bleecker Street toward South Ferry
Location

The Eighth Street station was a station on the demolished IRT Sixth Avenue Line in Manhattan, New York City. It had two tracks and two side platforms. It was served by trains from the IRT Sixth Avenue Line and opened on June 5, 1878. It closed on December 4, 1938.
