= 28th Street station (IRT Sixth Avenue Line) =

Former Manhattan Railway elevated station (closed 1938)

28th St.
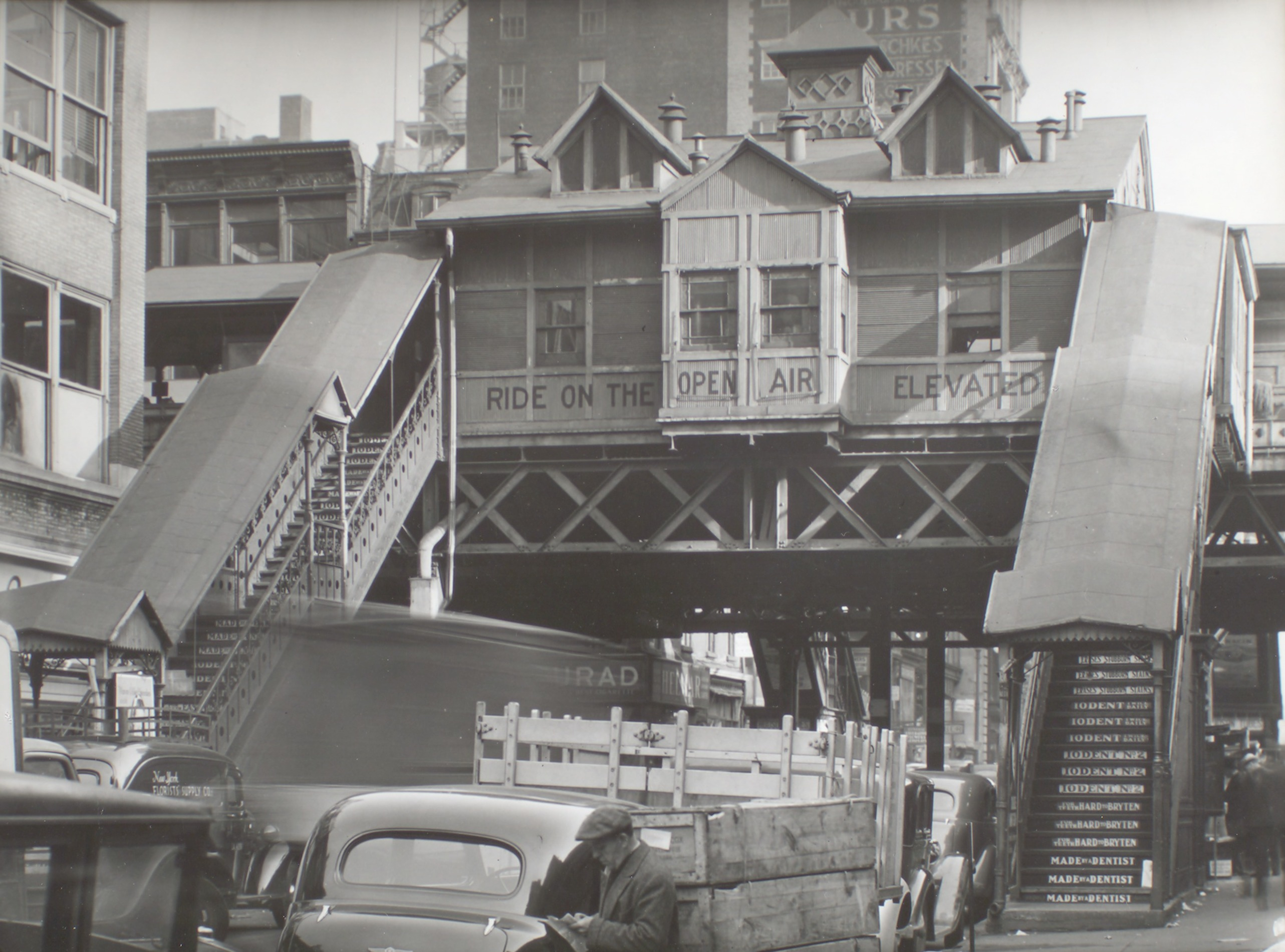
- 28th Street, 1938

General information
- Location: West 28th Street and 6th Avenue; New York, NY; Midtown Manhattan, Manhattan
- Coordinates: 40°44′45.68″N 73°59′25.88″W
- System: Former Manhattan Railway elevated station
- Operator: Interborough Rapid Transit Company
- Line: Sixth Avenue Line
- Platforms: 2 side platforms
- Tracks: 2

Construction
- Structure type: Elevated

History
- Opened: June 5, 1892; 134 years ago
- Closed: December 4, 1938; 87 years ago

Former services
Preceding station	Interborough Rapid Transit	Following station
33rd Street toward 155th Street	Sixth Avenue	23rd Street toward South Ferry
Location

The 28th Street station was a station on the demolished IRT Sixth Avenue Line in Manhattan, New York City. It had two tracks and two side platforms. It was served by trains from the IRT Sixth Avenue Line. This station opened in 1892. From 1910 to 1937 it also had a connection to the 28th Street (H&M station). It closed on December 4, 1938. The next southbound stop was 23rd Street. The next northbound stop was 33rd Street.
