= Ninth Avenue derailment =

1905 train derailment in New York City

1905 Ninth Avenue derailment
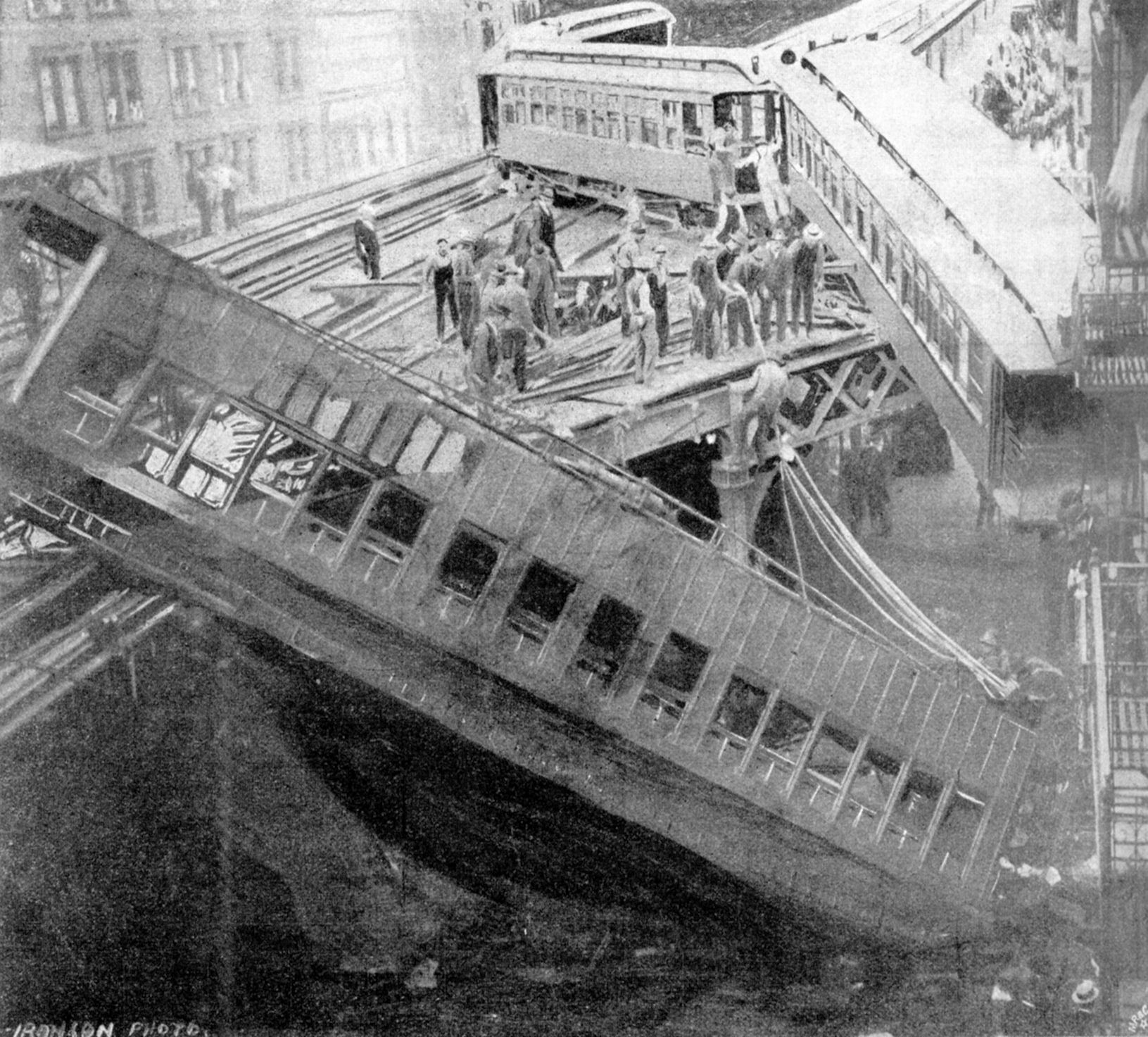
- Beginning cleanup after the Ninth Avenue derailment; picture from the German Elektrotechnische Zeitschrift of November 2, 1905

Details
- Date: September 11, 1905; 121 years ago 7:05 AM
- Location: above West 53rd Street entering 50th Street station
- Coordinates: 40.7635°N 73.9890°W
- Country: United States
- Line: IRT Ninth Avenue Line
- Operator: Interborough Rapid Transit Company
- Incident type: Derailment
- Cause: Excessive speed.

Statistics
- Trains: 1
- Passengers: unknown
- Deaths: 13
- Injured: 48 serious

The Ninth Avenue derailment, on the Ninth Avenue Elevated in Manhattan on September 11, 1905, was the worst accident on the New York City elevated railways, resulting in 13 deaths and 48 serious injuries.

== Context ==
Trains of the Ninth Avenue and Sixth Avenue elevated lines shared the same track above West 53rd Street, where the Sixth Avenue line branched off. Downtown-bound trains displayed disks indicating to the towerman at the junction whether he should set the switch for the train to enter the curve or proceed straight on to the 50th Street station.

== Accident ==
During the morning rush hour on September 11, 1905, a Ninth Avenue train following a Sixth Avenue train was mistakenly switched onto the curve. The train was traveling at 30 miles per hour (48 km/h) when it entered the sharp curve, for which 9 miles per hour (14 km/h) was the company-mandated limit. (Note: The account states 15 mph (24 km/h) and 8 mph (13 km/h) respectively.) The motorman, Paul Kelly, realizing the error, braked quickly. The lead car remained on the tracks but the second was thrown right off the trestle and down to the street, coming to rest with one end on the ground and the other across the third rail on the trestle, which sparked an electrical fire. (Note: Reed says the car somersaulted in the air and also that the front end was on the ground; the account in Railway and Locomotive Engineering is that it "turned completely over sidewise" but that it was the rear end that fell to the street.)

The roof was torn off and some passengers were crushed under the car by a falling truck and motor equipment from the third car, which came to rest hanging off the edge of the trestle against the front of an apartment building, into which some passengers were able to escape through a window. The rest of the train also derailed but continued down the trestle along Ninth Avenue. The death toll was 13, and 48 serious injuries in the second car. A police officer who had been standing in the street was also injured.

List of casualties
Name	Status	Notes
Jacob Anspach	Deceased	
Joseph Bach	Deceased	Policeman, was a pedestrian at street level hit by the falling train
John Corcoran	Deceased	
Emma Couenhoven	Deceased	
James Cooper	Deceased	
Louis Eberle	Deceased	
William Lees	Deceased	
Theodore Morris	Deceased	
Cornelius McCathy	Deceased	
Soloman Neugass	Deceased	
Ernest P. Scheibl	Deceased	
Albert Weilster	Deceased	
Henry Aiken	Injured	'Will die'. Fractured ribs, dislocated right leg
Lincoln Accstall	Injured	Critical Condition. Legs crushed
Rose Armstead	Injured	Taken home. Bruised and back sprained
J. Black	Injured	Contusions and bruises
Paul Blake	Injured	Contusions of face and body
William Beatty	Injured	Fractured Skull, numerous bruises and contusions
William Butler	Injured	Fractured arm and lacerated head
James T. Brown	Injured	Attended at home. Broken nose
Barbara Crell	Injured	Sent home. Suffered from shock
John J. Donohue	Injured	Contusions of back and body
Charles Dobson	Injured	Scalp wounds and injuries to back
Thomas Donnellen	Injured	Contusions of back
William Engel	Injured	'Will die'. Right leg amputated
Matthew Fitzgerald	Injured	Critical condition. Internal injuries and scalp wounds
John Fowler	Injured	Critical condition. Left arm amputated
Martin Gill	Injured	Taken home. Contusions of body
Jennie Guire	Injured	Went home. Injuries to left side
Patrick J. Gilligan	Injured	Left side crushed
John Gencet	Injured	Critical condition. Left arm and both legs fractured
Hattie Gellert	Injured	Critical condition. Internal injuries
Lindsley Harricon	Injured	Sent home. Right side injured
Walter Johnson	Injured	Leg injured and scalp wounds
O. Krunanquer	Injured	
Bridget McMahon	Injured	Critical condition. Internal injuries and injuries to the head
John P. McKenna	Injured	Left shoulder dislocated and right leg injured
Eliza Miner	Injured	'Will die'. Internal injuries, fractured skull, amputated leg
May Mooney	Injured	Contusions of back
Michael Morris	Injured	Contusions of back and body
Michael Mulligan	Injured	Sent home. Contusions of body
William F. Niebur	Injured	'Will die'. Skull fractured
Emil Nies	Injured	Lacerations of side and head
Henrietta Oesterling	Injured	Attended and went home. Right arm fractured
Rose Elmstell	Injured	Attended and went home. Scalp wounds and contusions
Fritz Pesmier	Injured	Attended and sent home. Scalp wounds
Arthur Quinn	Injured	Critical condition. Internal injuries and nervous shock
Seymour Roe	Injured	Critical condition. Fractured skull
? Rourke	Injured	Attended and went home
Thomas Swan	Injured	Both arms broken
Gertrude Speck	Injured	Critical condition. Injuries to head and back
Fred Wister	Injured	Both arms fractured
George Weber	Injured	Contusions of back
John Williams	Injured	Internal injuries, contusions of right leg

== Aftermath ==
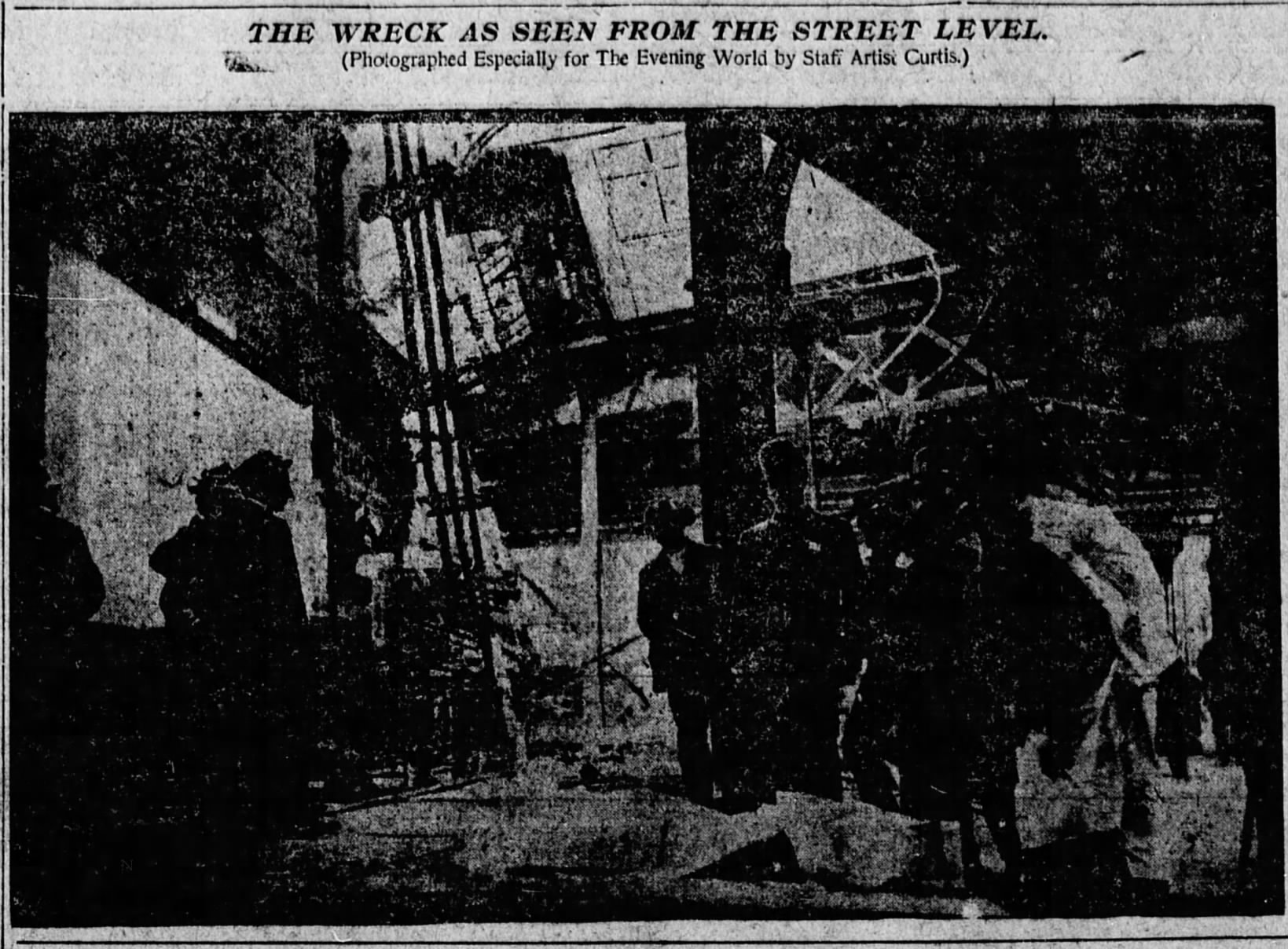

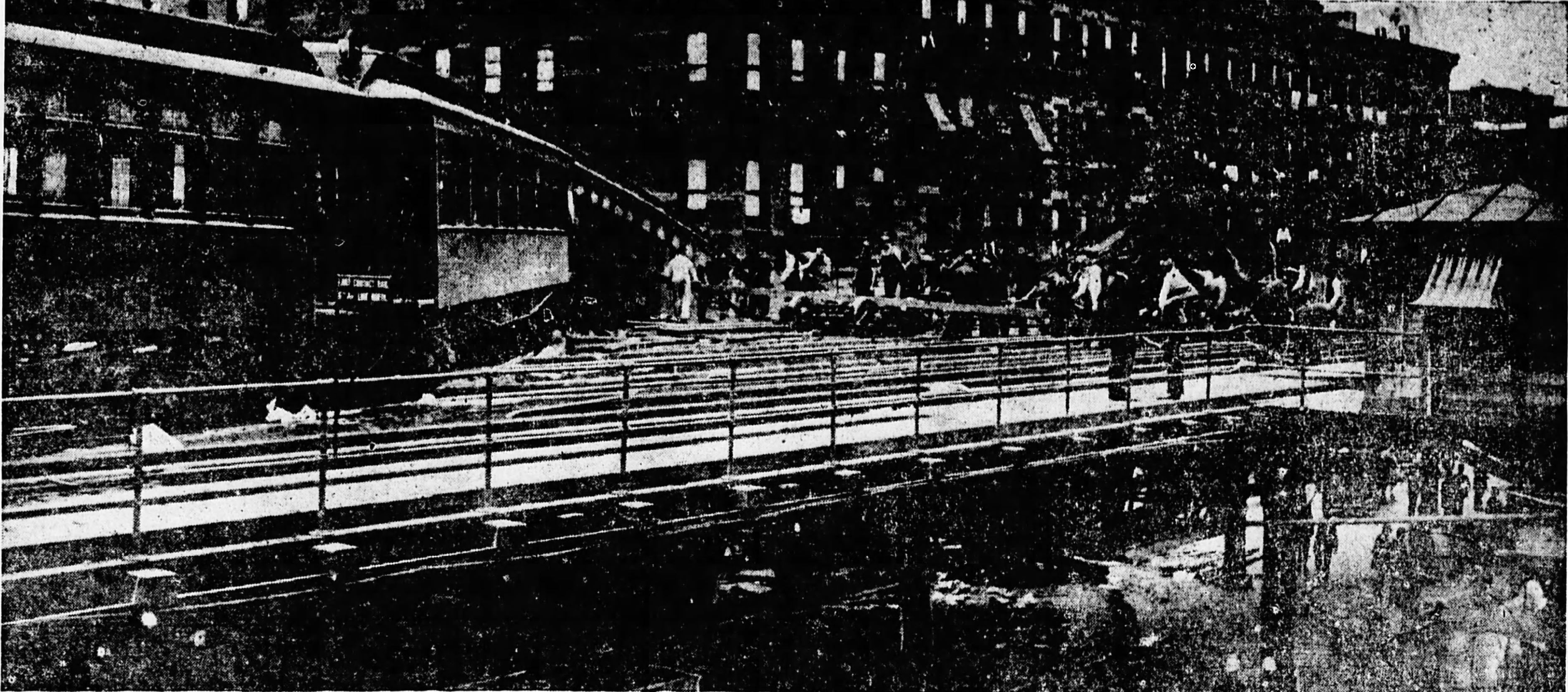
Photograph of wreckage from Ninth Avenue Elevated derailment September 11, 1905

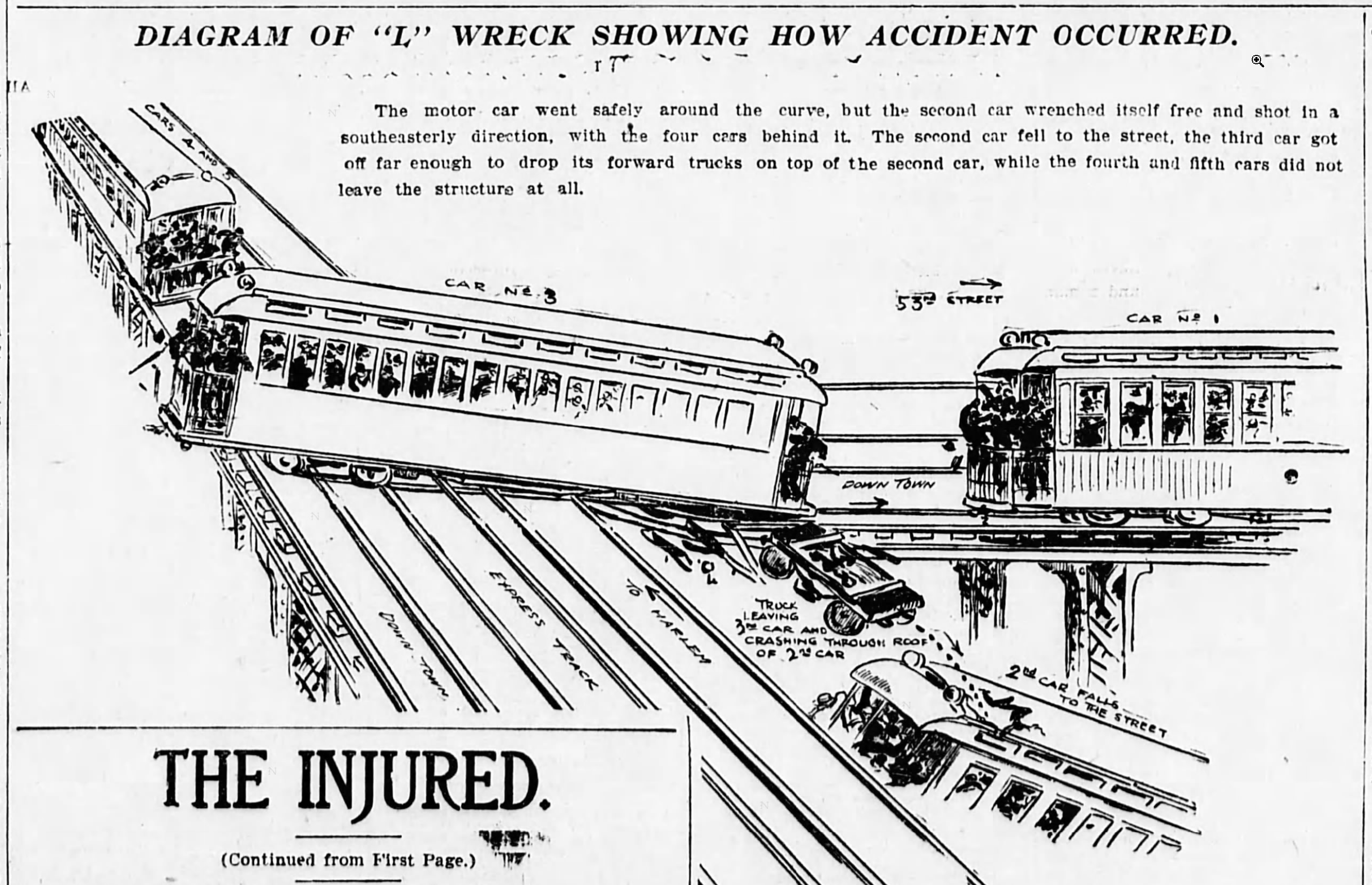
Diagram of the Ninth Avenue Elevated train derailment 1905-09-11 produced same day by local newspaper The Evening World

On September 23, the report of the Board of Rapid Transit Railroad Commissioners laid most of the blame for the accident on motorman Kelly, but some on the towerman, Cornelius Jackson, who was said to have been away from his post at the time of the accident. On October 2, the coroner's jury held both responsible.

Kelly claimed the train had been displaying the correct disks for Ninth Avenue; Jackson claimed it had not. The train's conductor, J.W. Johnson, who had the job of setting the disks on the train, backed Kelly, and so did the company, since station guards had identified the train as Ninth Avenue at every stop it had made before the accident.

However, the coroner's jury found that Kelly should have seen that the signal indicated the switch was set for Sixth Avenue, and that he was driving recklessly fast. Nevertheless, Kelly, who went missing after the accident, told a fellow motorman immediately afterwards that Jackson had been "trying to do him," accusing Jackson of having previously changed disks on the signal tower at the last second, forcing Kelly to back onto the other tracks, thus losing time and getting in trouble with the railway company.

Kelly could not back onto the other tracks this time because of his speed, which he explained had been due to the guards at 59th Street having called out 42nd Street as the next stop. Kelly was making up lost time on what he thought would be a straightaway to 42nd Street, not realizing until it was too late that the switch had actually been set for the curve to Sixth Avenue.

Jackson was convicted of second degree manslaughter but his conviction was later overturned. Kelly was arrested in San Francisco in June 1907, almost two years after the accident. He was convicted of manslaughter in the second degree and was sentenced to 18 to 30 months in prison. In February 1909, Kelly escaped from Sing Sing prison with another inmate he met while building a new prison at Bear Mountain, due to the bad food and brutal treatment. At the time Kelly had only six months left of his sentence as he was a model inmate. When the other inmate became ill, Kelly refused to continue on alone, and the two were subsequently captured.

== Sources ==
- Reed, Robert C. (1978). The New York Elevated. South Brunswick, NJ and New York: Barnes. ISBN 0-498-02138-6.
- Shaw, Robert B. (1961). Down Brakes: A History of Railroad Accidents, Safety Precautions and Operating Practices in the United States of America. London: P. R. Macmillan. OCLC 2641112.
