= IRT Sixth Avenue Line =

Former New York City rapid transit line

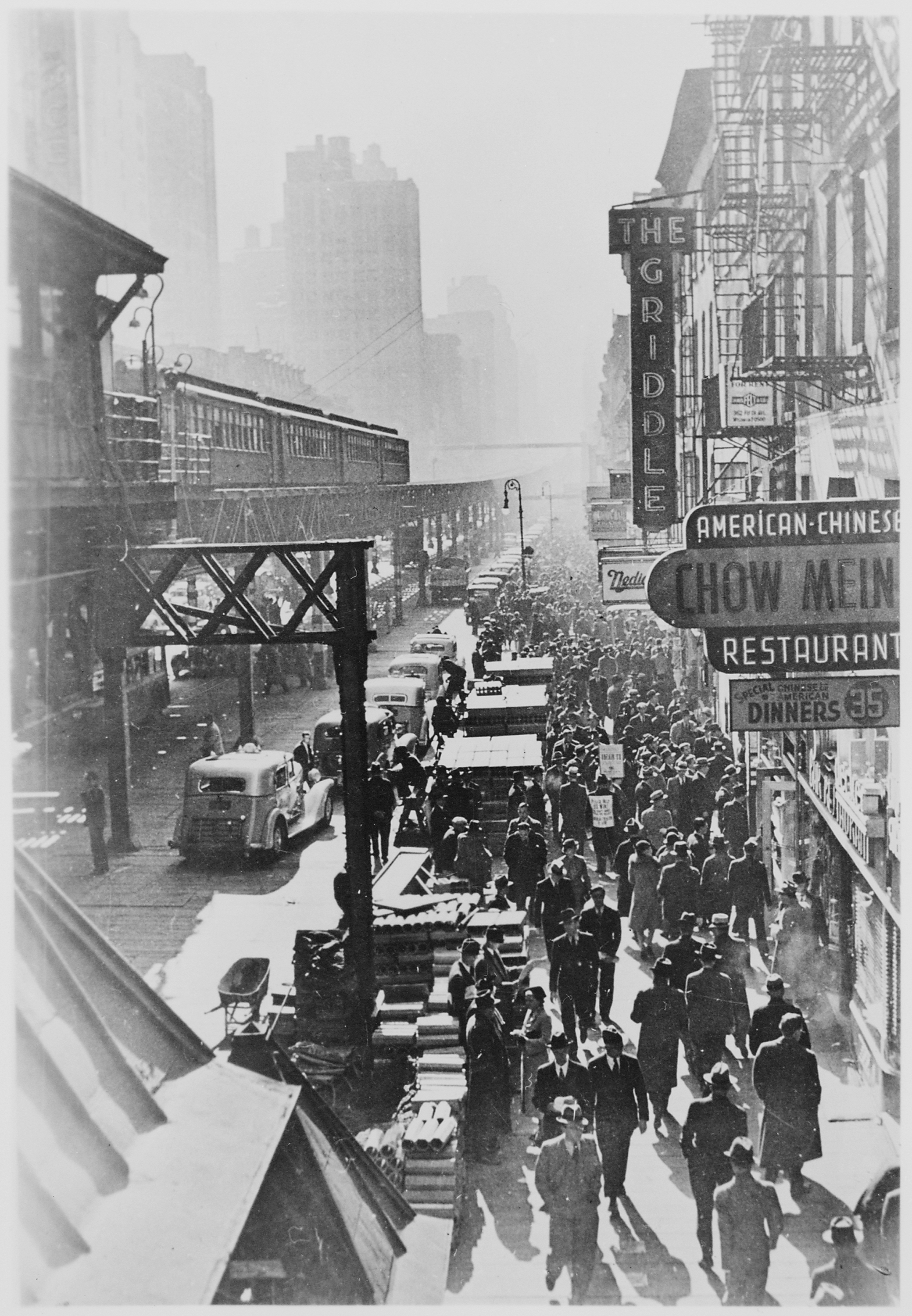
- New York City's Sixth Avenue elevated railway and the crowded street below

Overview
- Owner: City of New York
- Termini: Eighth Avenue; South Ferry

Service
- Type: Rapid transit
- System: Interborough Rapid Transit Company
- Operator: Interborough Rapid Transit Company

History
- Opened: 1878
- Closed: 1938

Technical
- Num of tracks: 2-3
- Character: Elevated
- Track gauge: 4 ft 8 1/2 in (1,435 mm)

The IRT Sixth Avenue Line, often called the Sixth Avenue Elevated or Sixth Avenue El, was the second elevated railway in Manhattan in New York City, following the Ninth Avenue Elevated.

The line ran south of Central Park, mainly along Sixth Avenue. Farther north, trains continued on the Ninth Avenue Line.

== History ==
The elevated line was constructed during the 1870s by the Gilbert Elevated Railway, subsequently reorganized as the Metropolitan Elevated Railway. The line opened on June 5, 1878 between Rector Street and 58th Street. Its route ran north from the corner of Rector Street and Trinity Place up Trinity Place / Church Street, then west for a block at Murray Street, then north again on West Broadway, west again across West 3rd Street to the foot of Sixth Avenue, and then north to 59th Street. The following year, ownership passed to the Manhattan Railway Company, which also controlled the other elevated railways in Manhattan. In 1881, the line was connected to the largely rebuilt Ninth Avenue Elevated; it was joined in the south at Morris Street, and in the north by a connecting link running across 53rd Street. It normally ran 24 hours a day, 7 days a week.

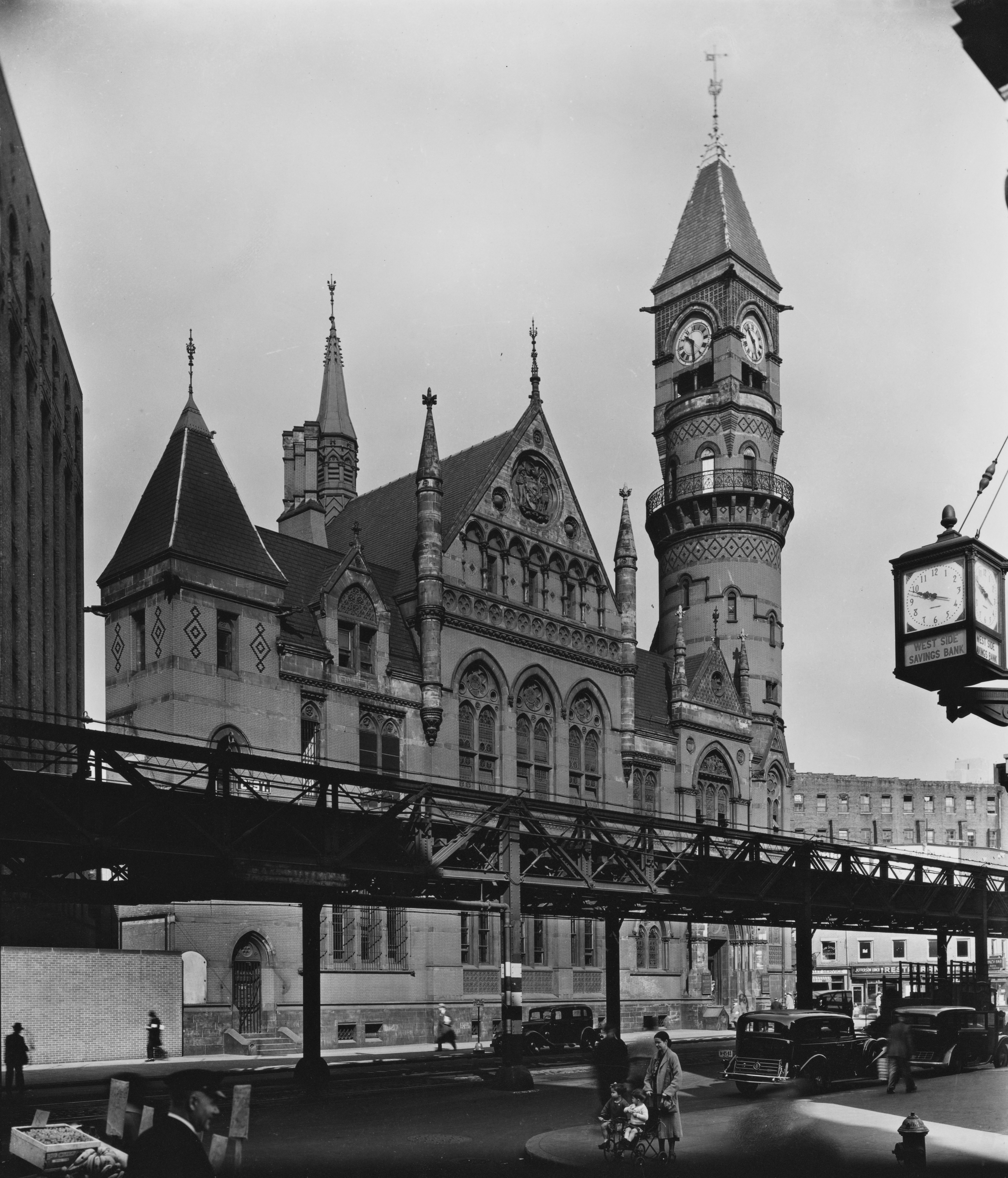
The Sixth Avenue El in Greenwich Village, 1935 Berenice Abbott

Due to its central location in Manhattan and the inversion of the usual relationship between street noise and height, the Sixth Avenue El attracted artists; in addition to being the subject of several paintings by John French Sloan, it was also painted by Francis Criss and others.

As of 1934, the following services were being operated:

- 6th Avenue Local - South Ferry to 155th Street all hours, extended to Burnside Avenue via Jerome Avenue Line weekday and Saturday evenings.
- 6th Avenue Express - Rector Street to Burnside Avenue via Jerome Avenue Line - weekday and Saturday peak hours. Trains ran express on Ninth Avenue southbound in the morning and northbound in the evening, and made all stops in the reverse direction.

As with many elevated railways in the city, the Sixth Avenue El made life difficult for those nearby. It was noisy, it made buildings shake, and in the line's early years, it dropped ash, oil, and cinders on pedestrians below. Eventually, a coalition of commercial establishments and building owners along Sixth Avenue campaigned to have the El removed, on the grounds that it was depressing business and property values.

In 1936, work started on the underground Sixth Avenue Line, operated by the city as part of the Independent Subway System (IND). As part of the plan, three of New York City's private subway companies (the IND; the IRT; and the Brooklyn–Manhattan Transit Corporation, or BMT) would be combined into one system, and the IRT Sixth Avenue elevated would be demolished. The city of New York acquired the line from the bondholders of the Manhattan Railway Company for $12,500,000, of which the city recovered $9,010,656 in back taxes and interest, in 1938. Subsequently, the El was closed on December 4, 1938. It was razed during 1939 to make way for the IND line. The section of the IND line that was located under Sixth Avenue opened in December 1940.

The footings for the elevated were rediscovered in the early 1990s during a Sixth Avenue renovation project.

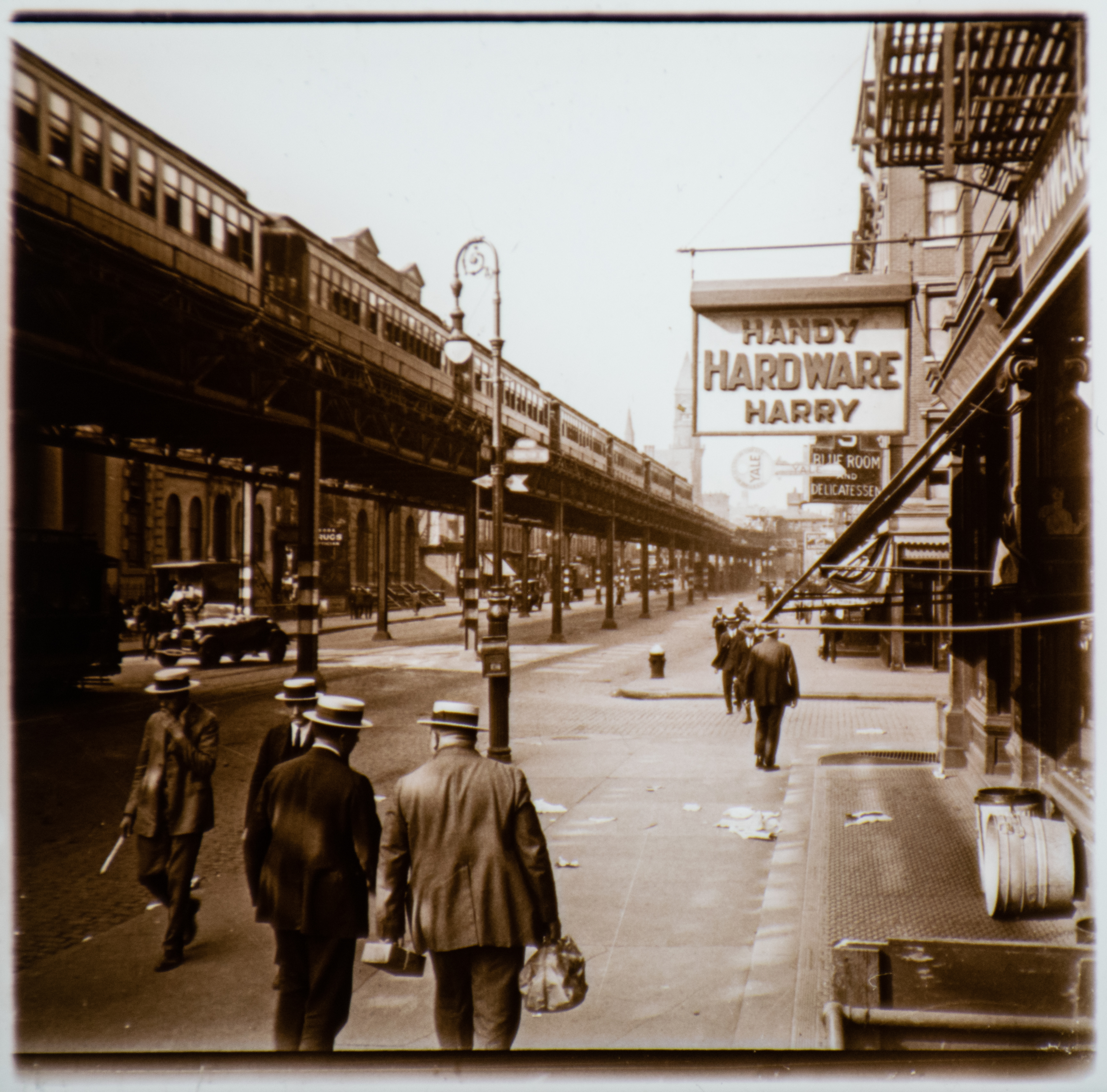
View of the IRT Sixth Avenue Line from the corner of Waverly Place

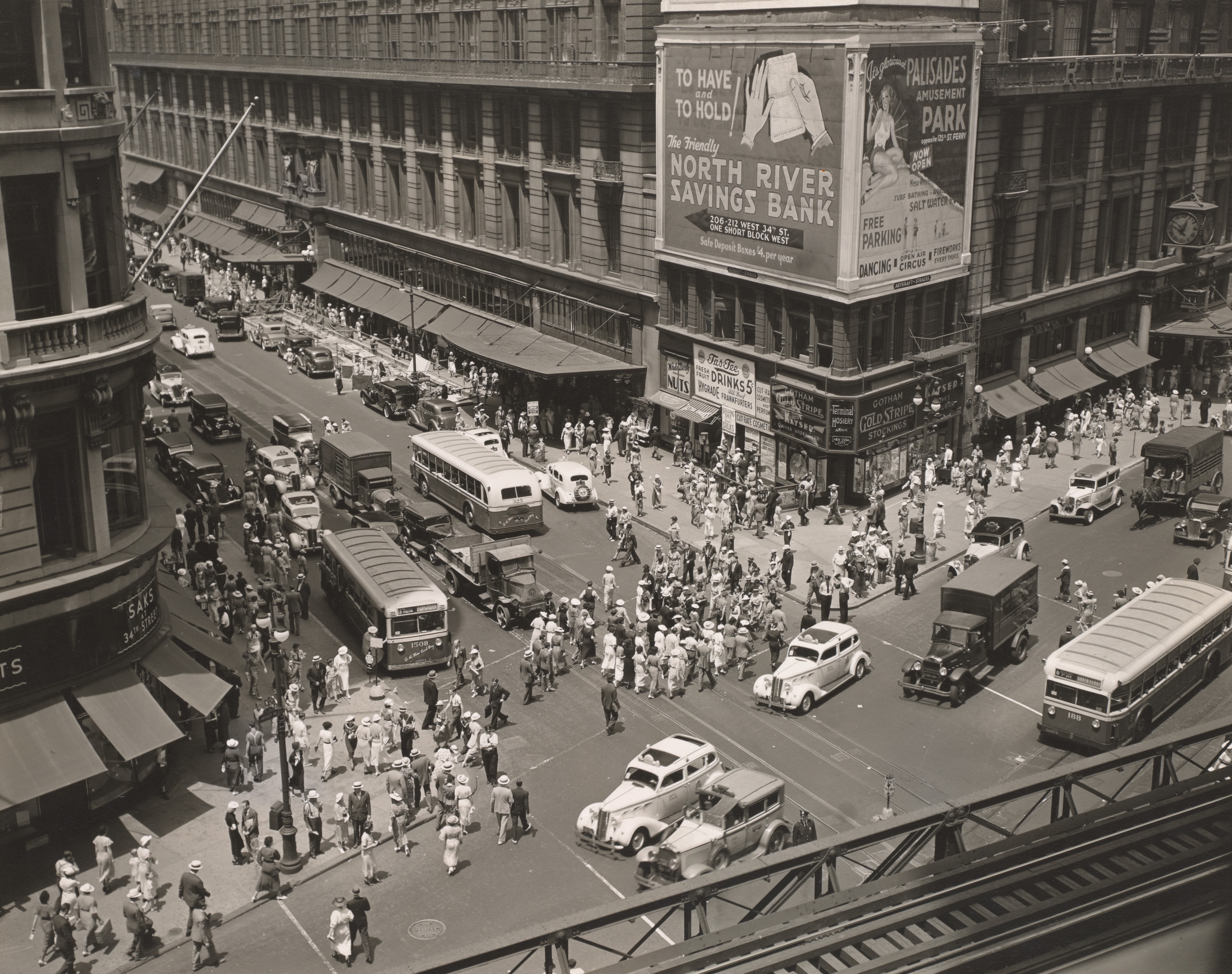
Looking down from 33rd St station, 1936 by Berenice Abbott

=== Allegations demolition scrap was sold to Japan ===
In order to alleviate any concern that the scrap metal might be exported to the Japanese, demolition contractor Tom Harris, who had received $40,000 to demolish the structure provided affidavits to the New York City Council that none of the iron would leave the United States. The inaccurate rumors were later included within the lines of E. E. Cummings's 1944 poem "plato told."

Twenty thousand tons of scrap metal from the El was sold to a dealer on the west coast who was in the export business. The New York Times pointed out in December 1938 that even if the scrap did not go directly to Japan, for possible use against China, such a large amount of scrap metal arriving on the market would free up metal to be sent to Japan.

At a meeting of the New York City Board of Estimate in 1942, Stanley M. Isaacs, the Manhattan Borough President, denied that steel from the El was sold to Japan. Isaacs said that when the demolition contract was drafted in 1938, "at my insistence the contract provided that not one ounce of that steel could be exported to Japan or to any one else." Isaacs said that the contractor was prohibited from exporting the steel from the El, and carried out his obligation to the letter.

Reports of the supposed sale of the scrap to Japan persisted. In 1961, an attorney for the Harris Structural Steel Company, which was involved in the demolition, told syndicated columnist George Sokolsky that continued reports of the sale of steel from the El to Japan were not accurate. The attorney said that none of the steel from the El reached Japan directly or indirectly.

== Station listing ==
All trains ran local, express trains utilized the Ninth Avenue express stations north of 53rd Street.

Station	Opening date	Closing date	Transfers and notes
59th Street	June 9, 1879	June 11, 1940	Ninth Avenue Line
Eighth Avenue	1881	December 4, 1938	
58th Street Terminal	June 5, 1878	June 16, 1924	Former northern terminal
50th Street	June 5, 1878	December 4, 1938	
42nd Street	June 5, 1878	December 4, 1938	
38th Street	January 31, 1914	December 4, 1938	
33rd Street	June 5, 1878	December 4, 1938	
28th Street	1892	December 4, 1938	
23rd Street	June 5, 1878	December 4, 1938	
18th Street	1892	December 4, 1938	
14th Street	June 5, 1878	December 4, 1938	
Eighth Street	June 5, 1878	December 4, 1938	
Bleecker Street	June 5, 1878	December 4, 1938	
Grand Street	June 5, 1878	December 4, 1938	
Franklin Street	June 5, 1878	December 4, 1938	
Chambers Street	June 5, 1878	December 4, 1938	
Park Place	June 5, 1878	December 4, 1938	
Cortlandt Street	June 5, 1878	December 4, 1938	
Rector Street	June 5, 1878	December 4, 1938	
Battery Place	June 5, 1883	June 11, 1940	Ninth Avenue Line
South Ferry	April 5, 1877		Second, Third, and Ninth Avenue Lines; various ferries
