= 50th Street station (IRT Ninth Avenue Line) =

Former Manhattan Railway elevated station (closed 1940)

50th St.

General information
- Location: West 50th Street and 9th Avenue; New York, NY; Midtown Manhattan, Manhattan
- Coordinates: 40°45′48.55″N 73°59′20.28″W
- System: Former Manhattan Railway elevated station
- Operator: Interborough Rapid Transit Company
- Line: Ninth Avenue Line
- Platforms: 2 side platforms
- Tracks: 3 (1 upper level; 2 lower level)

Construction
- Structure type: Elevated

History
- Opened: January 18, 1876; 150 years ago
- Closed: June 11, 1940; 86 years ago

Former services
Preceding station	Interborough Rapid Transit	Following station
59th Street toward 155th Street	Ninth Avenue Local	42nd Street toward South Ferry
Location

The 50th Street station was a local station on the demolished IRT Ninth Avenue Line in Manhattan, New York City. It was built on January 18, 1876 and eventually had two levels. The lower level was built first and had two tracks and two side platforms that served local trains. The upper level was built as part of the Dual Contracts and had one track that served express trains. It closed on June 11, 1940. The next southbound stop was 42nd Street. The next northbound stop was 59th Street.
