= Rufus Henry Gilbert =

American surgeon and inventor (1832–1885)

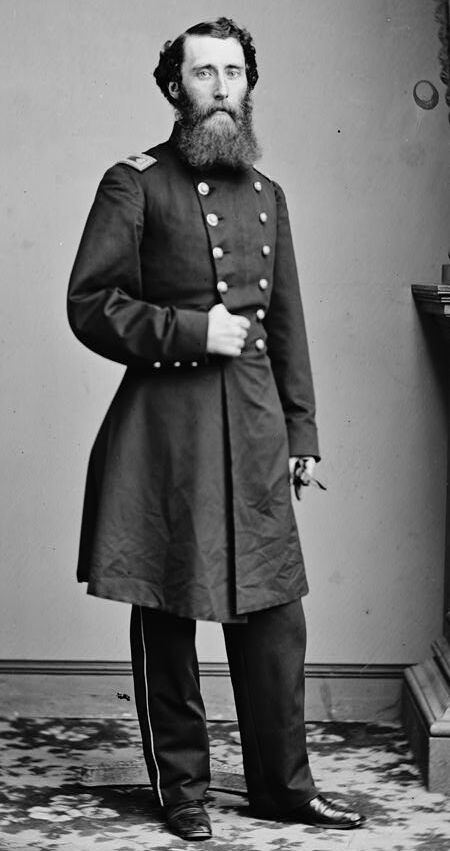
- Gilbert in uniform
- Born: January 26, 1832; Guilford, New York, U.S.
- Died: July 10, 1885 (aged 53); New York City, U.S.
- Parent: William Dwight Gilbert

Rufus Henry Gilbert (January 26, 1832 – July 10, 1885) was an American surgeon and inventor, who worked on rapid transit in New York City.

== Early life ==
Rufus Henry Gilbert was born in Guilford, New York on January 26, 1832. Gilbert was the son of William Dwight Gilbert, a county judge in Steuben County, New York.

== Career ==
=== Medical career ===
Gilbert studied at the New York College of Physicians and Surgeons and graduated to become a physician and surgeon. During his time in New York City, Gilbert became concerned with the cramped and overly centralized living conditions of the working class, seeing this as a major public health hazard, and began thinking about urban rapid transit as the key to provision of more sanitary living conditions.

During the American Civil War, he joined the 5th New York Volunteer Infantry as a surgeon, performing the first surgical procedure during the war at the Battle of Big Bethel. He was brevetted lieutenant colonel in 1865. He eventually became medical director and superintendent of the United States Army Hospitals.

=== Rapid transit visionary ===
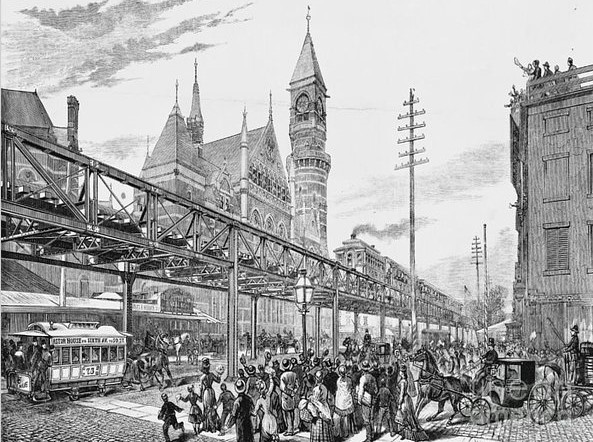
The first train on the Gilbert Elevated Railroad passing through Sixth Avenue, near the Jefferson Market Police Court, April 29th, 1878

Towards the end of the war, Gilbert's own medical issues prevented him from a further career in this field. Gilbert subsequently became Superintendent of the Central Railroad of New Jersey, where he worked on developing rapid transport in the New York City area.

In 1870 Gilbert obtained a patent for an elevated railway using the principle of pneumatics. Gilbert incorporated a company known as the Gilbert Elevated Railway Company but had difficulty obtaining adequate financing for the venture. Ultimately Gilbert was forced to surrender control of the company to the New York Loan and Improvement Company in order to obtain sufficient capital. The company constructed the Sixth Avenue road, known as Gilbert Elevated Railroad, which opened in 1878. Gilbert was forced out of the company by his partners soon after the road opened, however, effectively ending his career.

== Personal life ==
Gilbert married Miss Maynard, a daughter of judge John Maynard. He later married Miss Price, daughter of J. W. Price, of New York City.

Gilbert died on July 10, 1885, at his home on West 73rd Street in New York City.
