= Manhattan Railway Company =

American elevated railway company

The Manhattan Railway Company was an elevated railway company in Manhattan and the Bronx, New York City, United States. It operated four lines: the Second Avenue Line, Third Avenue Line, Sixth Avenue Line, and Ninth Avenue Line.

== History ==
=== 19th century ===
By the late 1870s, the elevated railways in Manhattan were operated by two companies, the Metropolitan Elevated Railway (Sixth Avenue) and New York Elevated Railroad (Third and Ninth Avenues). The Metropolitan also began constructing a line above Second Avenue. The Manhattan Railway Company was chartered on December 29, 1875, and leased both companies on May 20, 1879.

The company was the subject of investigation by the New York State Legislature's Hepburn Committee which exposed a scheme that involved barely legal business practices and massive watering of the company's stock in order to raise its nominal value from $2 million to $15 million. The exposure of the shady business practices of the company led the Hepburn Committee to propose an act of the legislature outlawing fictitious "ownership" of railroads via leases and related stock watering schemes.

From 1881, the Third Avenue Line and the Sixth Avenue Line were in service 24/7. The Suburban Rapid Transit Company, operating the Third Avenue Line in the Bronx, was leased on June 4, 1891; all three companies were eventually merged into the Manhattan Railway Company in February 1890.

Richard Croker, boss of Tammany Hall, was in the newspapers in 1899 after a disagreement with Jay Gould's son, George Gould, president of the Manhattan Railway Company, when Gould refused Croker's attempt to attach compressed-air pipes to the Elevated company's structures. Croker owned many shares of the New York Auto-Truck Company, a company which would have benefited from the arrangement. In response to the refusal, Croker used Tammany influence to create new city laws requiring drip pans under structures in Manhattan at every street crossing and the requirement that the railroad run trains every five minutes with a $100 violation for every instance.

=== 20th century ===
The Interborough Rapid Transit Company, incorporated in April 1902 as the operating company for its first subway line, signed a 999-year lease on the Manhattan Railway Company lines on April 1, 1903, over a year before the subway opened.

Finally, after 60 or more years of service, and after having operated under a series of companies and jurisdictions, mainly the IRT, the elevated lines began to disappear, with the first line closing in 1938, and the final section closing in 1973:

- service on the Sixth Avenue Line ended in 1938.
- the Ninth Avenue Line south of 155th Street and the Second Avenue Line north of 59th Street were closed in 1940, while the section of the Ninth Avenue Line from 155th Street north into the Bronx was continued as the "Polo Grounds Shuttle" until 1958.
- the final section of the Second Avenue Line closed in 1942.
- service on the Manhattan section of the Third Avenue Line was phased out in the early 1950s and ended in 1955, while the service on the Bronx section terminated in 1973.

Substation 7, built by the company around 1898 to convert alternating current to direct current, survives at 1782 Third Avenue, at 99th Street and is on the National Register of Historic Places. The contemporaneous 74th Street Powerhouse at York Avenue supplies electricity for Consolidated Edison.

== See also ==
- The Hepburn Committee
- George Jay Gould
- Frank K. Hain, longtime general manager
