= Andy Cameron (interactive artist) =

British interactive artist

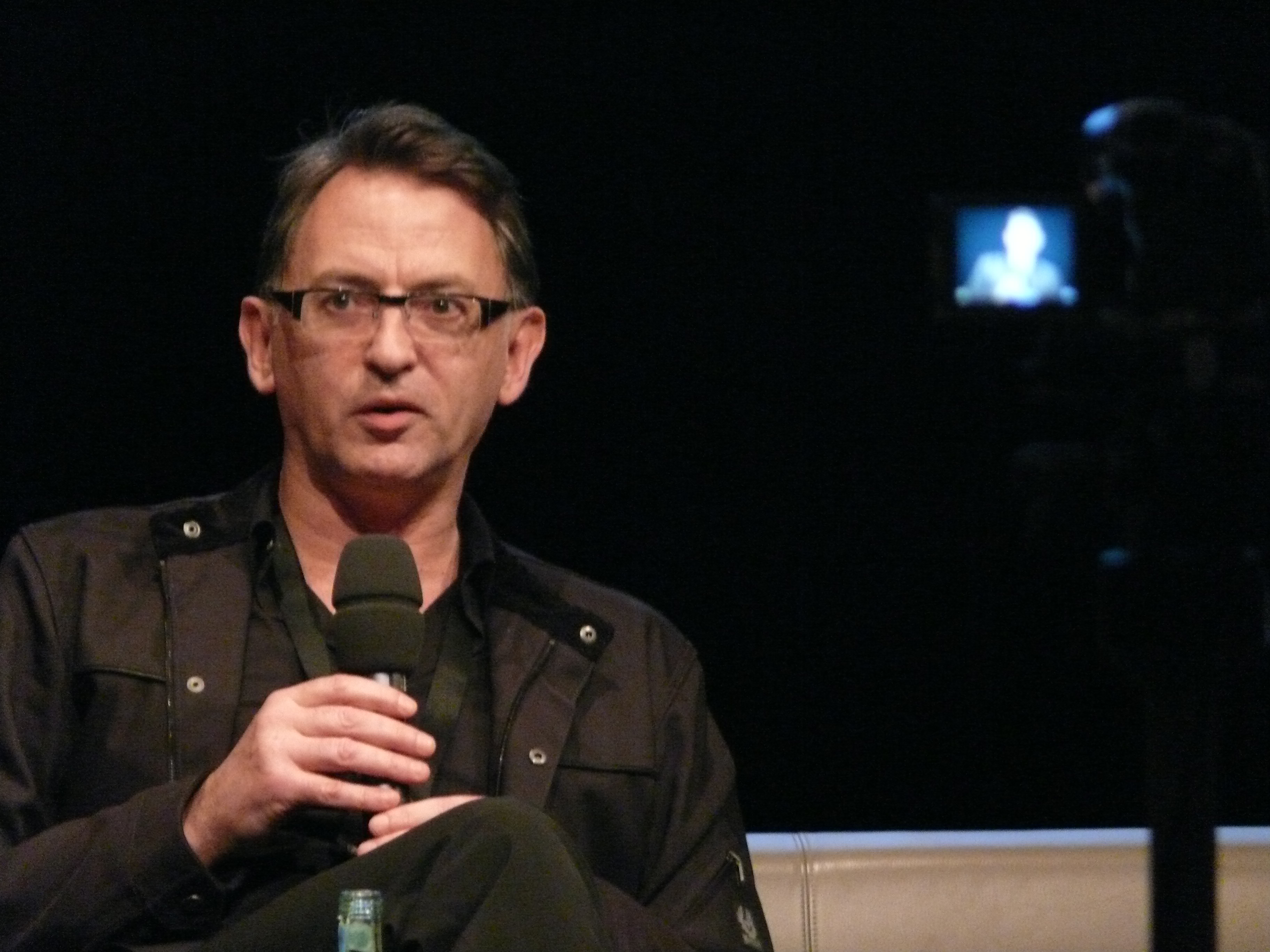
Andy Cameron at Transmediale 2010

Andy Cameron RDI (1959 – 28 May 2012) was a British interactive artist and writer, notable for being a founder of art collective group Antirom. He co-authored the highly cited essay The Californian Ideology with Richard Barbrook. In 2011 he received the Royal Designers for Industry award from The Royal Society of Arts.

== Career ==
Cameron was a teacher of photography at the University of Westminster when he founded Antirom in 1995 with a group of students, including Nicolas and Tom Roope who went on to found design studios Tomato and Plumen. After Antirom disbanded, Cameron joined Fabrica, the Italian research centre established by Benetton, in 2001. Cameron encouraged Fabrica to explore interaction design and led several digital campaigns for the company. Cameron remained at Fabrica for eight years working first as creative director for interactive and then later becoming executive director. In spring 2010 Cameron joined advertising agency Wieden+Kennedy as interactive creative director. He worked on The Kaiser Chiefs Bespoke Album Creation Experience as interactive director which won a D&AD Award in 2012.

Throughout his career Cameron conducted his own work which encompassed commercial projects as well as art installations for shows in venues such as Barbican, MoMA in New York and the Pompidou Centre. In 2009 he was a featured artist at the Decode exhibition at the Victoria and Albert Museum in London, with his installation Venetian Mirror.

== Selected publications ==
- Cameron, Andy. Barbrook, Richard. (1996) [1995] "The Californian Ideology". Science as Culture. 26, 44–72.
- Cameron, Andy. "DISSIMULATIONS+ FILM AND COMPUTERS-THE ILLUSION OF INTERACTIVITY." _Millennium Film Journal_ 28 (1995)
- Cameron, Andy. "Dinner with Myron Or: Rereading artificial reality 2: Reflections on interface and art." aRt & D: Research and development in art (2005): 10-27.
- Cameron, Andy. "The Art of Experimental Interaction Design". Systems Design, 2004. ISBN 978-9889706586

== Death ==
Cameron died suddenly in London on 28 May 2012 of a heart attack.
