= Pokey =

Pokey, Poky or Pokie may refer to:

== Entertainment ==
- Pokey (Mario), a recurring enemy from the Super Mario series
- Pokey (Gumby character), a character from the Gumby television series
- Pokey the Penguin, a surrealistic online comic strip and its eponymous title character
- Pokey Minch (Porky Minch), a character in the Super NES video game EarthBound (Mother 2), and the Pig King in Mother 3
- The Poky Little Puppy, a fictional character whose name is sometimes shortened to just Poky
- Poky (Yoko Tsuno), a character in comic album series Yoko Tsuno
- Poky (device), a casino gambling machine
- Slot machines (Australian slang: pokies)
- Pokey, the nickname for "Clyde", the orange ghost, in the arcade game Pac-Man

== People ==
=== Nickname ===
- Pokey, writer and voice actor for Battle for Dream Island
- Pokey Allen (1943–1996), football player and head coach
- Pokey Chatman (born 1969), Women's National Basketball Association general manager and head coach
- Pokey LaFarge (born 1983), American musician and songwriter
- Pokey Reddick (born 1964), retired National Hockey League goaltender
- Pokey Reese (born 1973), former Major League Baseball player
- Lillian Watson (born 1950), American former world record holder in swimming
- Ontaria Wilson (born 1999), gridiron football player

=== Surname ===
- Diana Pokie (born 1979), politician in Suriname
- Gregory Pokie (born 1987), footballer in Suriname; see Suriname national football team

== Science and technology ==
- POKEY, a digital audio chip in Atari 8-bit computers and many arcade games
- Pokey, several species of Poecilotheria, a genus of spiders
- Poky, a reference distribution of the Yocto Project

== Other uses ==
- Prison (slang: Pokey)
- Nipple poking or pokie, an erect nipple visible beneath clothing
- Pokey Award, by the Straphangers Campaign, for bus routes in New York City, US

== See also ==
- Big Pokey (1974–2023), American rapper
- Poke (disambiguation)
- Poki (disambiguation)
