= Poki =

Poki may refer to:

- Kade Poki (born 1988), New Zealand rugby union player
- Poki language, a West Chadic language of Bauchi State, Nigeria
- Poki Ng (born 1991), Hong Kong singer in the boy band Error
- Pokimane (born 1996), Moroccan-Canadian internet personality
- Poki, a computer poker player developed at the University of Alberta
- Poki.com, a video game website from the Netherlands

== See also ==
- Pokki, a Windows Shell extension by SweetLabs
- Poke (disambiguation)
- Pokey (disambiguation)
