= Unbuilt plans for the Second Avenue Subway =

History of a New York City Subway line

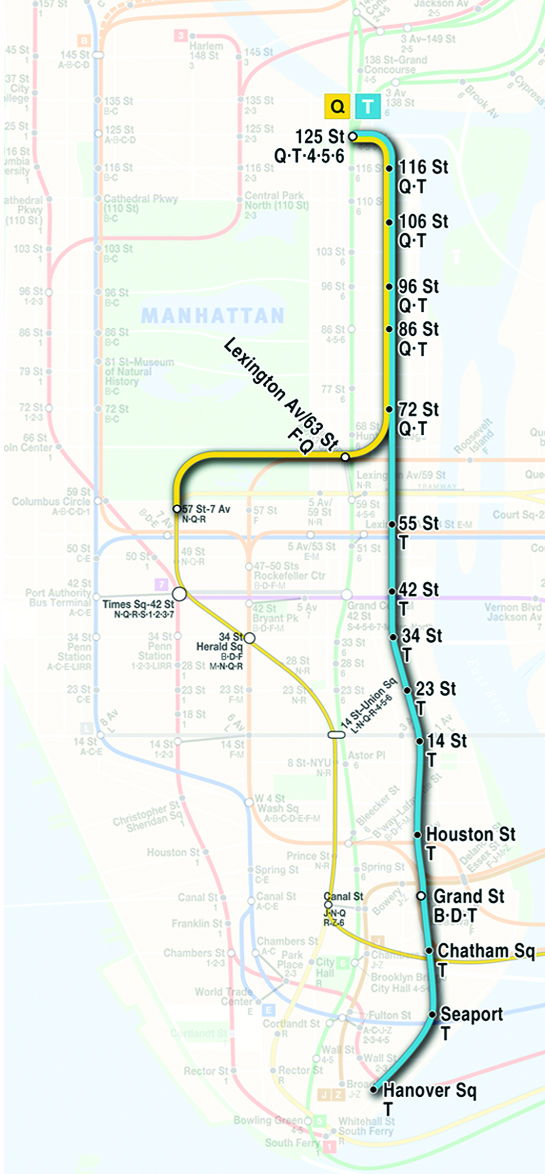
Proposed map of the most current plan for the Second Avenue Subway, which started construction in 2007

The Second Avenue Subway, a New York City Subway line that runs under Second Avenue on the East Side of Manhattan, has been proposed since 1920; the first phase of the line did not open until 2017. Up until the 1960s, many distinct plans for the Second Avenue subway line were never carried out, though small segments were built in the 1970s. The complex reasons for these delays are why the line has been called "the line that time forgot".

The line was originally proposed in 1920 as part of a massive expansion of what would become the Independent Subway System (IND). The Great Depression crushed the original proposal, and lack of funds scuttled numerous revivals throughout the 20th century. Meanwhile, the elevated lines along Second Avenue and Third Avenue, which the Second Avenue Line was intended to replace, were respectively demolished in 1942 and 1955, leaving the Lexington Avenue Subway as the only rapid transit line on much of Manhattan's east side.

Construction of tunnels began in 1972 as part of the Program for Action, but was halted in 1975 because of the city's fiscal crisis, with only a few short segments of tunnel having been completed. Meanwhile, construction of the 63rd Street Lines, which would connect the Second Avenue Line and the IND Queens Boulevard Line to the BMT Broadway Line and the IND Sixth Avenue Line, began in 1969. The first segment of the 63rd Street Lines, which opened on October 29, 1989, included provisions for future connections to the Second Avenue Line. When the construction of the Second Avenue Subway finally commenced in the 21st century, the Lexington Avenue Line was by far the busiest subway line in the United States, with an estimated 1.3 million daily riders in 2015. The first phase of the Second Avenue Subway opened in 2017, and a second phase is under development as of 2024.

== 1920–1941: Initial planning ==
After World War I, the New York City Subway experienced a surge in ridership. By 1920, 1.3 billion annual passengers were riding the subway, compared to 523 million annual riders just seven years before the war. The same year, the New York Public Service Commission launched a study at the behest of engineer Daniel L. Turner to determine what improvements were needed in the city's public transport system. Turner's final paper, titled Proposed Comprehensive Rapid Transit System, was a massive plan calling for new routes under almost every north-south Manhattan avenue, extensions to lines in Brooklyn and Queens, and several crossings of the Narrows to Staten Island. Massively scaled-down versions of some of Turner's plans were found in proposals for the new city-owned Independent Subway System (IND). Among the plans was a massive trunk line under Second Avenue consisting of at least six tracks and numerous branches throughout Brooklyn, Queens, and the Bronx. Turner also proposed that the two elevated lines be knocked down to make room for the 6-track Second Avenue Subway. The plan was to connect the new line to the then-unbuilt Sixth Avenue and Eighth Avenue subway lines. A proposal for a Third Avenue subway was also put forth, as was another one for a First Avenue Subway. However, in the initial version of the plan, an East Side subway was not prioritized as part of the IND's construction, regardless of whether it was under First, Second, or Third Avenues.

In January 1927, Turner submitted a revised proposal. It was now going to connect to a Tenth Avenue trunk line as well as to crosstown lines in the Bronx and Queens. The Second Avenue Subway was still a six-track line through Manhattan, except for a short eight-track tunnel at its junction with the Queens lines. The plan called for a connection to the IND Concourse Line in the Bronx, as well as another one to the IND Fulton Street Line in Brooklyn. Such a plan would have cost $165,000,000 (equivalent to $3.058×10^{9} in 2025), including connections and underwater crossings. As the IRT Lexington Avenue Line got more crowded, some suggested ideas that were considered unusual. One suggestion included a new tunnel under Lexington Avenue, while another included a tunnel under a separate right-of-way between Second and Third Avenue.

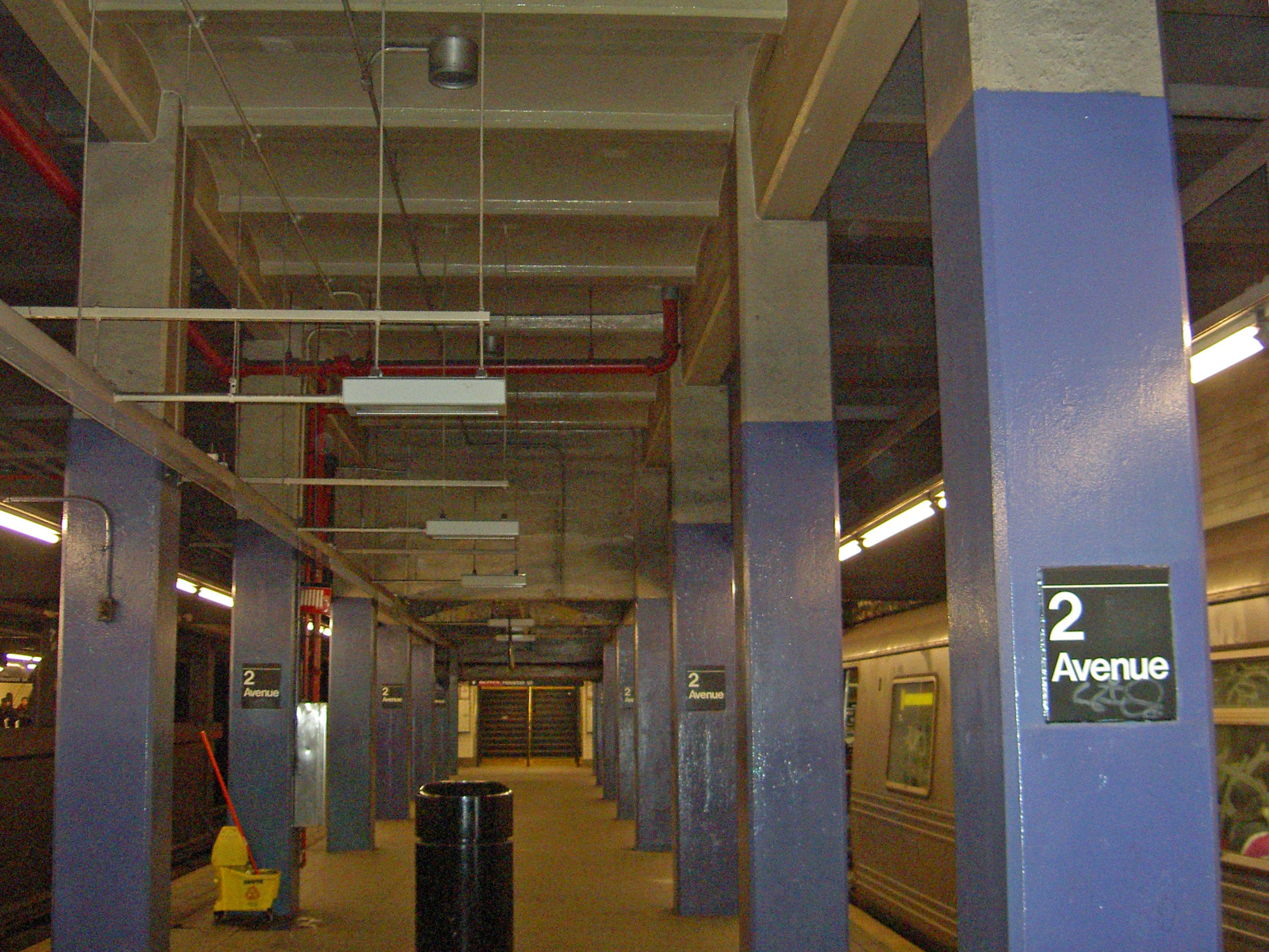
A space in the roof of the Second Avenue station where the Second Avenue Subway was to have passed through (Note: For context, see: Brennan, Joseph (2002). "Abandoned Stations : IND Second System unfinished stations". Columbia University.)

On September 16, 1929, the Board of Transportation of the City of New York (BOT) tentatively approved the expansion, which included a Second Avenue Line with a projected construction cost of $98,900,000 (equivalent to $1.838×10^{9} in 2025), not counting land acquisition. From north to south, the 1929 plan included four tracks from the Harlem River (where it would continue north as a Bronx trunk line with several branches) to 125th Street, six tracks from 125th Street to a link with the Sixth Avenue Line at 61st Street, four tracks from 61st Street to Chambers Street, and two tracks from Chambers Street to Pine Street. The plan was soon modified with the addition of another Bronx branch, as well as an extension of the subway to Water and Wall Streets. At the time, it was supposed to be completed between 1938 and 1941. In anticipation of the line's opening, real estate prices along the proposed route rose by an average of 50%. There were high demand for tenements along the route of the proposed subway, and sites located at street corners along the route were quickly bought up.

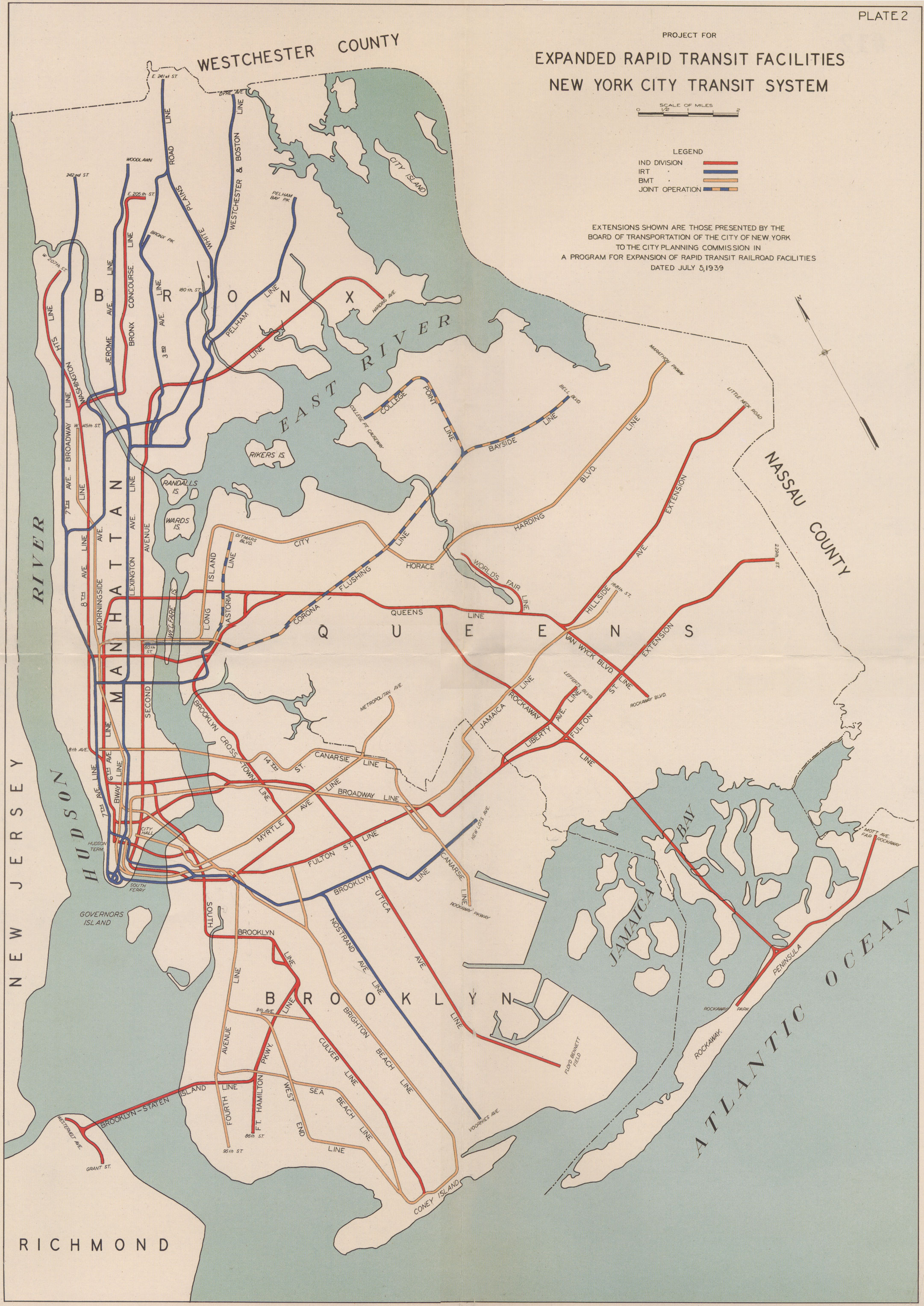
A 1939 plan for expansion; the Second Avenue Subway is depicted as a red line going from the southeast Bronx into Manhattan, and Brooklyn, where it connects to the Fulton Street Line.

Due to the Great Depression, the soaring costs of the expansion became unmanageable. Construction on the first phase of the IND was already behind schedule, and the city and state were no longer able to provide funding. By 1930, the line was shortened to between 125th and 34th Streets, with a turnoff at 34th Street and a crosstown connection there; this line was to be complete by 1948. The line above 32nd Street was to start construction in 1931, with construction of a southern extension to Houston Street to commence in 1935; these segments would open in 1937 and 1940, respectively. By 1932, the Board of Transportation had modified the plan to further reduce costs, omitting a branch in the Bronx, and truncating the line's southern terminus to the Nassau Street Loop.

Further revision of the plan and more studies followed. By 1939, construction had been postponed indefinitely, and the Second Avenue Line was relegated to "proposed" status. The Board of Transportation had ranked it as the city's 14th most important transportation project. The Second Avenue Line was also cut to two tracks, but now had a connection to the BMT Broadway Line. The reduced plan now had a single northern branch through Throggs Neck, Bronx, and a branch south into Brooklyn, connecting to a stub of the IND Fulton Street Line at the Court Street station, which is now the site of the New York Transit Museum. The subway's projected cost went up to US$249 million (equivalent to $5.450×10^{9} in 2025). The United States' entry into World War II in 1941 halted all but the most urgent public works projects, delaying the Second Avenue Line once again.

== 1940s–1950s: After World War II ==
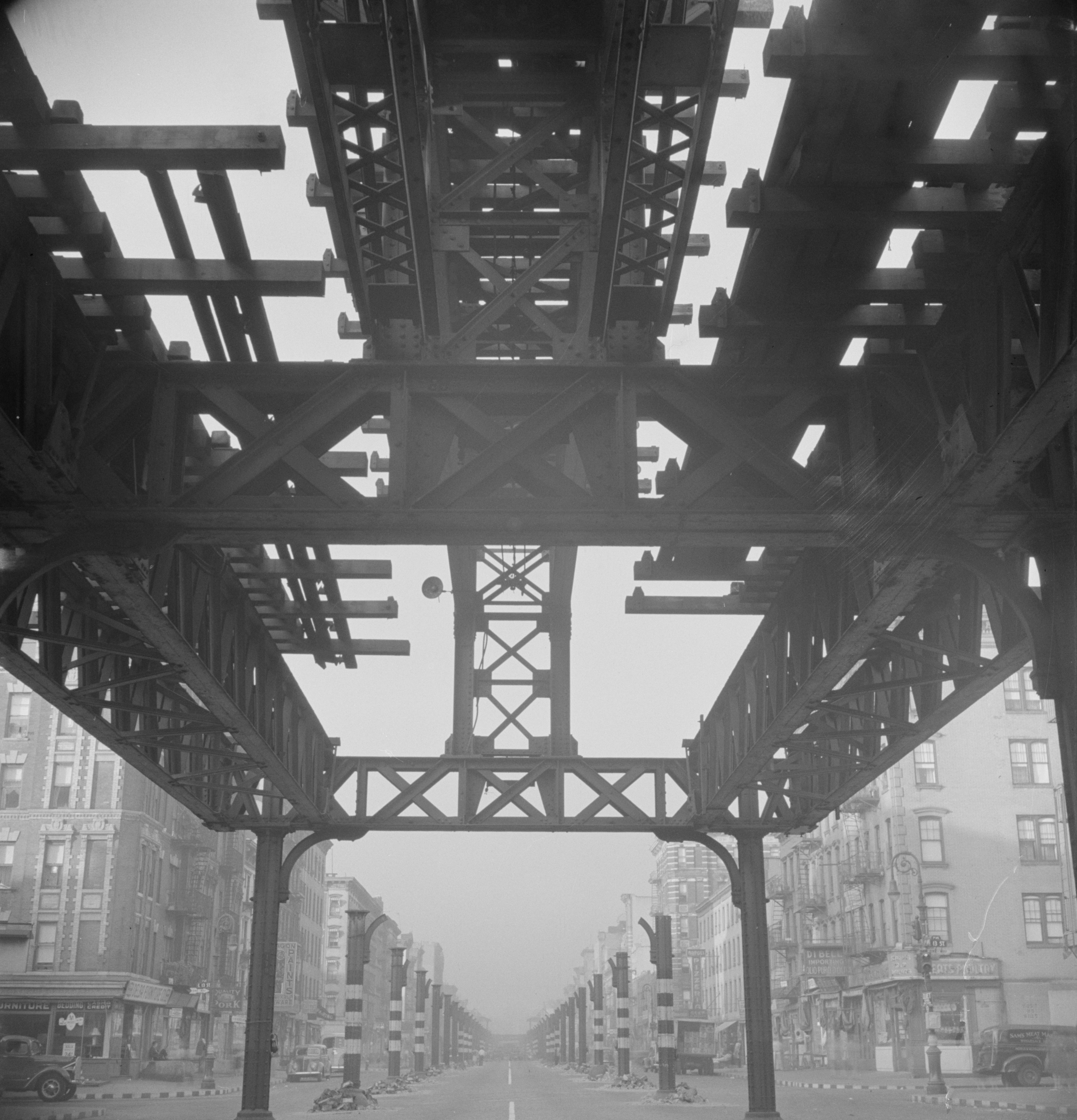
The Second Avenue El was demolished in September 1942. This photo was taken at First Avenue from 13th Street, looking south.

As part of the unification of the three subway companies that comprised the New York City Subway in 1940, elevated lines were being shut down all over the city and replaced by subways, continuing the IND's trend of phasing out elevated lines and streetcars in favor of new subways. For example, the IND Sixth Avenue Line replaced the Sixth Avenue Elevated, while the IND Fulton Street Line replaced the Fulton Street Elevated. Demolition of the elevateds also had the perceived effect of revitalizing the neighborhoods that they traveled through. The northern half of the Second Avenue Elevated, serving the Upper East Side and East Harlem, closed on June 11, 1940; the southern half, running through Lower Manhattan, East Midtown and across the Queensboro Bridge to Queens, closed on June 13, 1942. The demolition of the Second Avenue elevated caused overcrowding on the Astoria and Flushing Lines in Queens, which no longer had direct service to Manhattan's far East Side. Because of the elevated line's closure, as well as a corresponding increase in the East Side's population, the need for a Second Avenue subway increased.

In 1944, Mayor Fiorello H. La Guardia announced that work on the Second Avenue subway line was progressing. The same year, BOT superintendent Philip E. Pheifer came up with a map of train frequencies for the line, with about 56 trains per hour projected to go through the Second Avenue line. Pheifer also put forth a proposal for Second Avenue Subway services, which would branch extensively off to B Division lines, including the IND Sixth Avenue Line, BMT Broadway Line, and BMT Nassau Street Line, via pre-existing BMT trackage over the Manhattan and Williamsburg Bridges. From Canal Street to 57th Street the line was to be four tracks, with six tracks north of 57th Street. South of Canal Street there would be two tracks. The subway was to be opened by 1951. In addition, a new Bronx Branch would replace the Third Avenue El in the Bronx. By 1945, though, plans for the Second Avenue Subway were again revised. The southern two-track portion was abandoned as a possible future plan for connecting the line to Brooklyn, while a Bronx route to Throggs Neck was put forth.

Under Mayor William O'Dwyer and General Charles P. Gross, another plan was put forth in 1947 by Colonel Sidney H. Bingham, a city planner and former Interborough Rapid Transit Company (IRT) engineer. O'Dwyer and Gross believed that construction of a Second Avenue subway line would be vital to both increasing capacity on existing lines and allowing new branch lines to be built. This plan would again connect the Second Avenue Line to Brooklyn. As with Pheifer's proposal, a train frequency map was created; however, Bingham's proposal involved more branch lines and track connections. A connection to Brooklyn was to be made via the Manhattan and Williamsburg Bridge, and would allow trains from these bridges to go onto the Sixth Avenue Line or the Second Avenue Line. Other connections to the Second Avenue Line were to be provided at 57th Street, via a line connecting to the Sixth Avenue Line; two express tracks would be built along that line north of West Fourth Street. The IRT Pelham Line would be switched to the combined IND/BMT division (this plan also includes other connections, which have been built), and connected to the Second Avenue Line. The Second Avenue Line would end just north of that connection, at 149th Street, with transfers to the IRT White Plains Road Line and the elevated IRT Third Avenue Line, the latter of which would be demolished south of 149th Street. There would also be a connection to the IND Concourse Line. The line was to be built in sections. The Manhattan section was top-priority, but the Brooklyn section was 19th on the priority list, and the Bronx section did not have a specific priority.

By the next year, New York City had budget shortfalls. The city was short of $145 million (in 1948 dollars) that were needed for rehabilitation and proposed capital improvements, which cost a total of $800 million. The city petitioned the New York State Legislature to exceed its $655 million debt ceiling so that the city could spend $500 million on subway construction, but this request was denied.

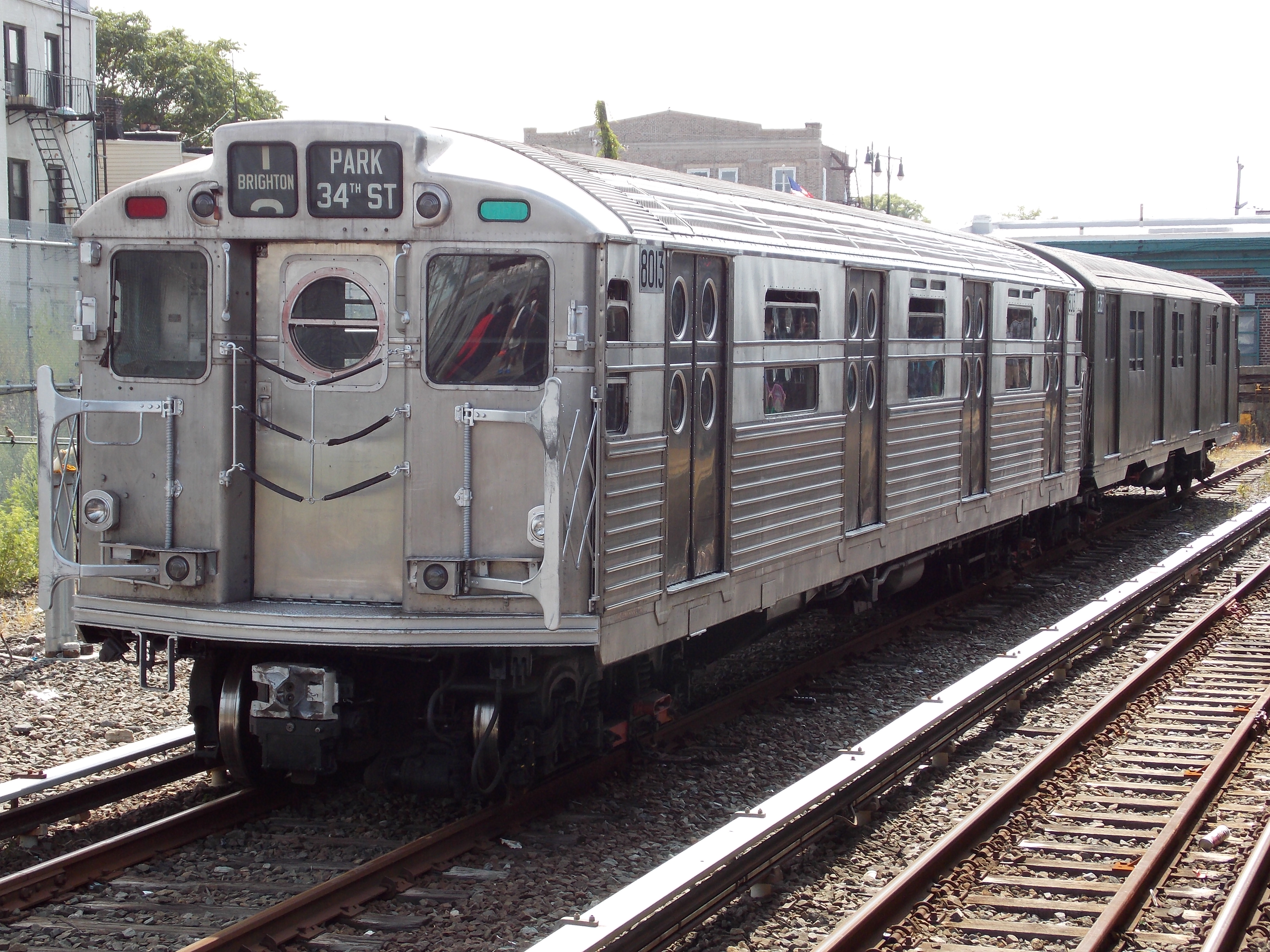
An R11 car, ten of which were built for the Second Avenue Subway.

The New York Board of Transportation ordered ten new prototype subway cars made of stainless steel from the Budd Company. These R11 cars, so called because of their contract number, were delivered in 1949 and specifically intended for the Second Avenue Subway. They cost US$100,000 (equivalent to $1,000,000 in 2025) each; the train became known as the "million dollar train". The cars featured porthole style round windows and a new public address system. Reflecting public health concerns of the day, especially regarding polio, the R11 cars were equipped with electrostatic air filters and ultraviolet lamps in their ventilation systems to kill germs.

In 1949, Queens and Lower Manhattan residents complained that the Second Avenue Subway would not create better transit options for them. A year later, revised plans called for a connection from Second Avenue at 76th Street to Queens, under 34th Avenue and Northern Boulevard, via a new tunnel under the East River. Connections would also be made to the Long Island Rail Road (LIRR)'s Rockaway Beach Branch. (Note: The tunnel plan was revitalized as part of the 2005 Transportation Bond Act, which would connect the LIRR trackage to Grand Central Terminal via the 63rd Street Tunnel as part of the East Side Access project.) New York voters approved a bond measure for its construction in 1951, and the city was barely able to raise the requisite $559 million for the construction effort. However, the onset of the Korean War caused soaring prices for construction materials and saw the beginning of massive inflation. Money from the 1951 bond measure was diverted to buy new cars, lengthen platforms, and maintain other parts of the aging New York City Subway system. Out of a half-billion-dollar bond measure, only $112 million (equivalent to $1.389×10^{9} in 2025), or 22% of the original amount, went toward the Second Avenue Subway. By then, construction was due to start by either 1952 or 1957, with estimated completion by 1958 at the earliest. Because many people thought that the bonds were solely to be used on the new subway, many people accused the New York City Transit Authority (NYCTA) of misusing the bonds.

By January 1955, the Port Authority of New York and New Jersey and the Triborough Bridge and Tunnel Authority could theoretically raise $1.25 billion effective immediately (equivalent to $1.5023×10^{10} in 2025). In his 1974 book The Power Broker, Robert A. Caro estimated that this amount of money could modernize both the Long Island Rail Road for $700 million and the Hudson & Manhattan Railroad for $500 million, with money left over to build the Second Avenue Subway as well as proposed extensions of subway lines in Queens and Brooklyn. However, Robert Moses, the city's chief urban planner at the time, did not allow funding for most mass transit expansions in the New York City area, instead building highways and parkways without any provisions for mass transit lines in the future. Caro noted that the lack of attention to mass transit expansions like the Second Avenue Subway contributed to the decline of the subway: "When Robert Moses came to power in New York in 1934, the city's mass transportation system was probably the best in the world. When he left power in 1968 it was quite possibly the worst."

A block to the west of the proposed subway line, the Manhattan section of the Third Avenue Elevated, the only other elevated line in the area, closed on May 13, 1955, and was demolished in 1956. Contrary to what many East Side residents thought, the demolition of the elevateds did not help the travel situation, as the Lexington Avenue Line was now the only subway transportation option on the East Side, leading to overcrowding.

By 1957, it had become clear that the 1951 bond issue was not going to be able to pay for the Second Avenue Line. The money had been used for other projects, such as the integration of the IRT Dyre Avenue Line, and IND Rockaway Line and reconfiguration of the DeKalb Avenue Interlocking. By then, the New York Times despaired of the line's ever being built. "It certainly will cost more than $500 million and will require a new bond issue," wrote one reporter. In March of that year, NYCTA chairman Charles L. Patterson stated that the NYCTA had used the bond funds properly and that the bonds were not dedicated solely to fund the Second Avenue Line. He stated that the bonds had been allocated to the corridor based on increasing ridership on the Second Avenue Line, but admitted that currency inflation, as well as necessary rehabilitation work to the existing lines, made the Second Avenue Line unlikely in the near future. Despite the lack of funding and declining ridership, the city government still believed the Second Avenue Line to be a priority, with the New York City Planning Commission expressing support for the line in a 1963 report.

== 1960s: New plans ==
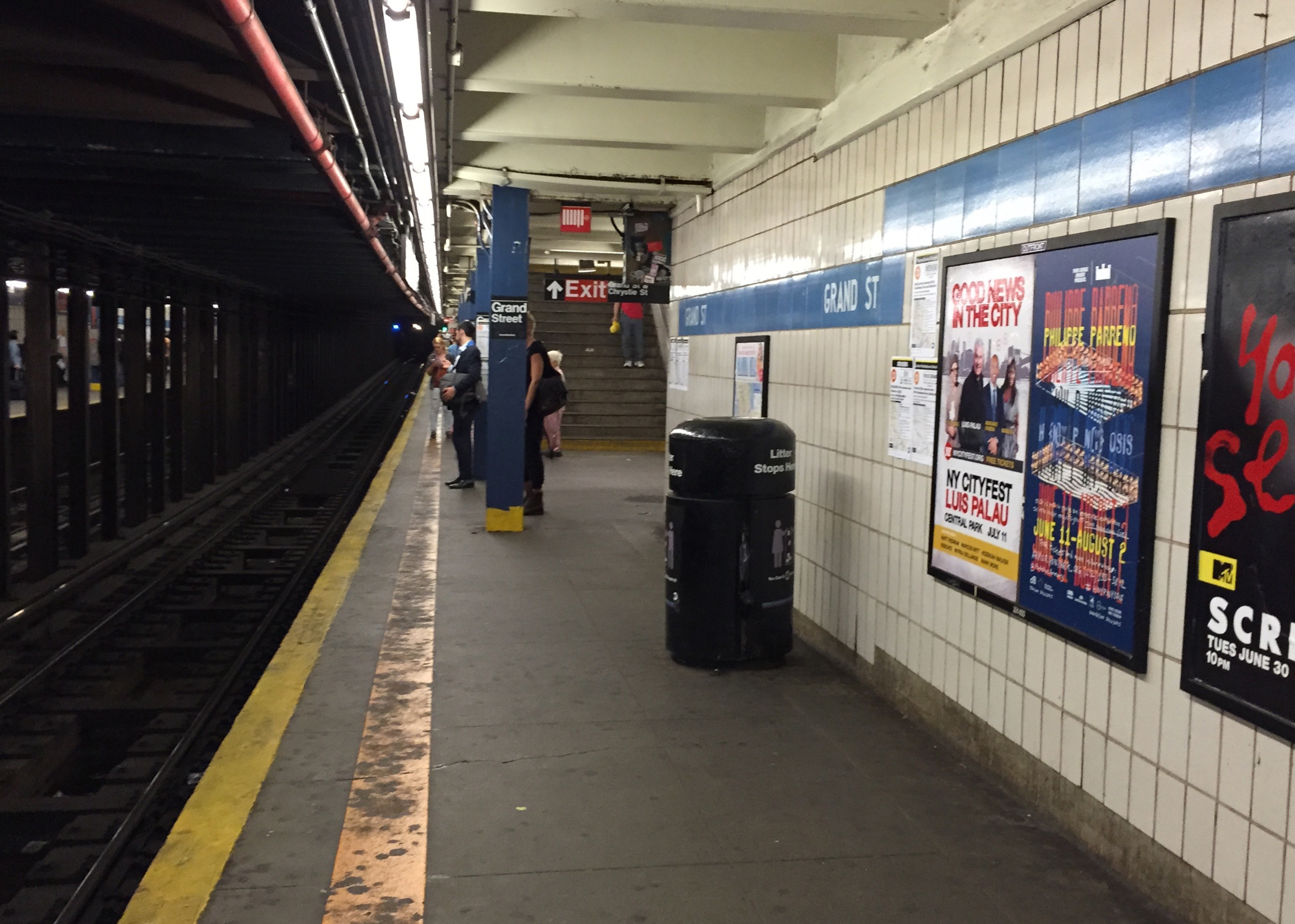
The Grand Street station, built as part of the Chrystie Street Connection, was originally conceived with a possible cross-platform interchange with the Second Avenue Subway.

As the early 1960s progressed, the East Side experienced an increase in development, and the Lexington Avenue Line became overcrowded. In 1962, construction began on a connection between the Manhattan and Williamsburg Bridges and the Sixth Avenue Line. This segment, the Chrystie Street Connection, was first proposed in the 1947 plan as the southern end of the Second Avenue line, which would feed into the two bridges. When opened on November 26, 1967, the connection included the new Grand Street station on the Sixth Avenue Line (another station, 57th Street, opened on July 1, 1968), and introduced the most significant service changes ever carried out in the subway's history. Grand Street, located under Chrystie Street (the southern end of Second Avenue) was designed to include cross-platform transfers between the Sixth Avenue and Second Avenue Lines.

=== Plans approved ===
In 1964, Congress passed the Urban Mass Transportation Act, promising federal money to fund mass transit projects in America's cities via the Urban Mass Transportation Administration (UMTA). Three years later, voters approved a $2.5 billion (worth about $2.4139×10^{10} in current dollars) Transportation Bond Issue, which provided over $600 million (worth $5.793×10^{9} today) for New York City projects, including for a 1968 Program for Action. The Second Avenue project, for a line from 34th Street to the Bronx, was given top priority. The City secured a $25 million UMTA grant for initial construction. On March 19, 1970, the Board of Estimate approved Route 132-C, which was the portion of the line south of 34th Street. Mayor John Lindsay, on August 16, 1970, announced the approval of a $11.6 million design contract for the line, which was awarded to DeLeuw, Cather & Company. Second Avenue was chosen for a subway line over First Avenue because it was closer to places of employment than First Avenue. Construction of the entire line was seen as conducive to revitalizing New York City's then-declining economy, and the line was a big component of the 1969 "Plan for New York City" proposal.

==== Route 132-A ====
The Program for Action proposed a Second Avenue line to be built in three phases. The first phase, officially Route 132-A, would have run between 34th Street in Midtown and 126th Street under Second Avenue. This section was expected to cost $381 million (equal to about $3.029×10^{9} today). The line would have included stops at Kips Bay (34th Street), United Nations (between 44th Street and 48th Street), Midtown East (57th Street), Yorkville (86th Street), Franklin Plaza (106th Street), and Triboro Plaza (125th Street). The 48th Street stop would connect to a planned Metropolitan Transportation Center at Third Avenue and 48th Street, which would contain a new east side terminal for the Long Island Rail Road. The line included older proposals for connections to the Sixth Avenue and Broadway lines in Midtown via a new crosstown line, which would now be located on 63rd Street. The 63rd Street Line would also include a connection allowing Second Avenue line trains to run to Queens, which would have been used in revenue service. Between 72nd Street and 48th Street there were going to be four tracks to provide more efficient service.

The entirety of the 4.7 miles (7.6 km)-long Route 132-A was to be constructed underground through tunneling and cut-and-cover. Station mezzanines; the line north of 92nd Street, where the rock profile drops away sharply; and the area around 48th Street, where there is a crevice in the rock profile, would be constructed using cut-and-cover. The temporary decking of Second Avenue was required for this construction to take place and to allow for traffic aboveground to proceed. The remaining portions of the line were to be built through tunneling. Only one business relocation was planned for the construction of the line. A gas station at the southeast corner of 63rd Street and Second Avenue was to be relocated as the site needed to be used for a construction and ventilation shaft, in addition to being used for a permanent ventilation superstructure. Underground easements were to be required under thirteen properties in the vicinity of 63rd Street. Compared to other subway lines, the Second Avenue line was going to be much quieter.

==== Route 132-B ====
The line's second phase, Route 132-B would have extended it north from East 126th Street to East 180th Street in the Bronx. Second Avenue line trains would use a new express bypass line along East 138th Street, and the former tracks of the New York, Westchester and Boston Railway (NYW&B) near the Bruckner Expressway. In Hunts Point, service would split into two branches. One branch would continue to use former NYW&B trackage to East 180th Street, at which point the line would connect to the IRT Dyre Avenue Line. A second branch would connect to the IRT Pelham Line in the vicinity of Whitlock Avenue station, another element from earlier plans. The first branch would take over all service on the Dyre Avenue Line, offering cross-platform transfers to IRT White Plains Road Line trains at East 180th Street station, which would also be reconfigured. The second branch would take over service on the upper portion of the Pelham Line, between Whitlock Avenue and Pelham Bay Park. All stations on the Dyre Avenue and upper Pelham Lines would have platforms shaved back to accommodate larger B Division trains. There were 140,000 daily passengers expected on the Second Avenue line at 64th Street, reducing the number of passengers on the Lexington Avenue Line from 287,000 passengers at 64th Street to 171,000.

As part of the approved plan, in the Bronx, the line would have run along East 138th Street, with a cross-platform transfer to Lexington Avenue Line trains at Brook Avenue on the IRT Pelham Line, which would have been reconfigured. A study was undertaken to determine whether an alternative route would reduce costs. Adoption of the alternate route would have required a new Route and General Plan. As part of the alternative plan, this transfer station was eliminated from the plan due to high environmental problems and high costs. Instead, the line would diverge from the original route from a location 150 feet (46 m) north of the Harlem River bulkhead, would swing eastward, passing through the Willis Avenue Bridge piers, underneath the Penn Central's Harlem River Yard and between the Triboro Bridge piers. Then the line would head north, entering an open cut, before using two unused tracks in the vicinity of Willow Avenue and East 132nd Street, using the Penn Central's bridges and embankments to return to the original route at East 141st Street. Running in a tunnel would remove potential conflicts with the rail yard and would have allowed the rail yard to be redeveloped.

This alternative was found to cost $117 million (equal to about $700,000,000 today), compared to the original plan, which would have cost $240 million (equal to about $1.436×10^{9} today). The original route would have displaced five commercial properties while the alternative would have required the relocation of tracks and warehouse platforms in the yard. The downside of the alternative was that it would not provide a transfer in the South Bronx between the Pelham Line and the Second Avenue Line, preventing Second Avenue passengers from directly accessing Pelham Line stations between Brook Avenue and Longwood Avenue. The alternate route reduced environmental impacts since it was to be constructed through the rail yard, as opposed to under East 138th Street.

Also during this phase, service on the upper Pelham Line would be extended to Co-op City, Bronx. A third branch of the Second Avenue line to replace the Third Avenue El in the Bronx would also be built, running adjacent to the right-of-way of Metro-North's Harlem Line on Park Avenue.

==== Route 132-C ====
The line's final phase, Route 132-C, would have extended the Second Avenue line south from 34th Street in Midtown to Lower Manhattan, and would have been 3.7 miles (6.0 km) long. This section was expected to cost $393 million (equal to about $2.850×10^{9} today). A majority of the section, 12,400 feet (3,800 m), would be constructed using cut-and-cover, with the remainder, 6,700 feet (2,000 m) using tunnel boring machines. Tunnel boring machines were to have been employed to construct the sections between East 32nd Street and East 7th Street, and Wall Street and Whitehall Street. The alignment for this portion of the line would have been via Second Avenue, Chrystie Street, Chatham Square, Saint James Place, and Water Street to the terminal near Water Street and Whitehall Street. The line would have consisted of two tracks, with layup tracks to insure operational reliability. Pine-Wall and Whitehall Street stations would both have four tracks (two platform levels with two tracks each) in order to increase the capacity of the Whitehall Street terminal above 30 trains per hour to 40 trains per hour, and to improve passenger flow. One platform would be used for Queens-bound service, while the other would be for Bronx-bound service. The 14th Street station would have had three tracks on a single level to facilitate access to and from the 615 feet (187 m)-long pit track located to the north of the station.

The seven stations on the line would have been East 23rd Street (between East 23rd Street and East 27th Street), East 14th Street (between East 13th Street to East 15th Street), East Houston Street (at the intersection of East Houston Street with Chrystie Street and Second Avenue), Grand Street (enlarging the existing station), Chatham Square (under Chatham Square at the intersection of East Broadway, the Bowery, Park Row and St. James Place), Pine–Wall (under Water Street from Wall Street to John Street) and Whitehall Street (under Water Street from Whitehall Street to Coenties Slip). Free transfers would be offered to existing lines at 14th Street, East Houston Street and Whitehall Street, while Grand Street would be reconstructed. The East Houston Street station would have used the existing provisions located within the mezzanine of the Second Avenue station on the IND Sixth Avenue Line. During construction, a portion of Sara D. Roosevelt Park at Chrystie Street would have been used for the line's construction.

All stations would have included escalators, high intensity lighting, improved audio systems, platform edge strips, and non-slip floors to accommodate the needs of the elderly and people with disabilities, but no elevators. Space at each station would have been used for ancillary facilities. The stations were to be made with brick walls and pavers alongside stainless steel, and would have relatively small dimensions, with 10-foot (3.0 m) mezzanine ceilings. Design contracts were awarded for several stations. Morris Ketchum Jr. & Associates were given the design contract for Chatham Square; Haines, Lundberg & Waehler for Grand Street; Poor & Swanke & Partners for 23rd Street; Harrison & Abramovitz for 48th Street; I. M. Pei & Associates for 57th Street; Carson, Lundin & Thorsen for 72nd Street; Gruzen & Partners for 86th Street; Damaz & Weigel for 96th Street; and Johnson & Hanchard for 106th Street.

=== Station location controversy ===
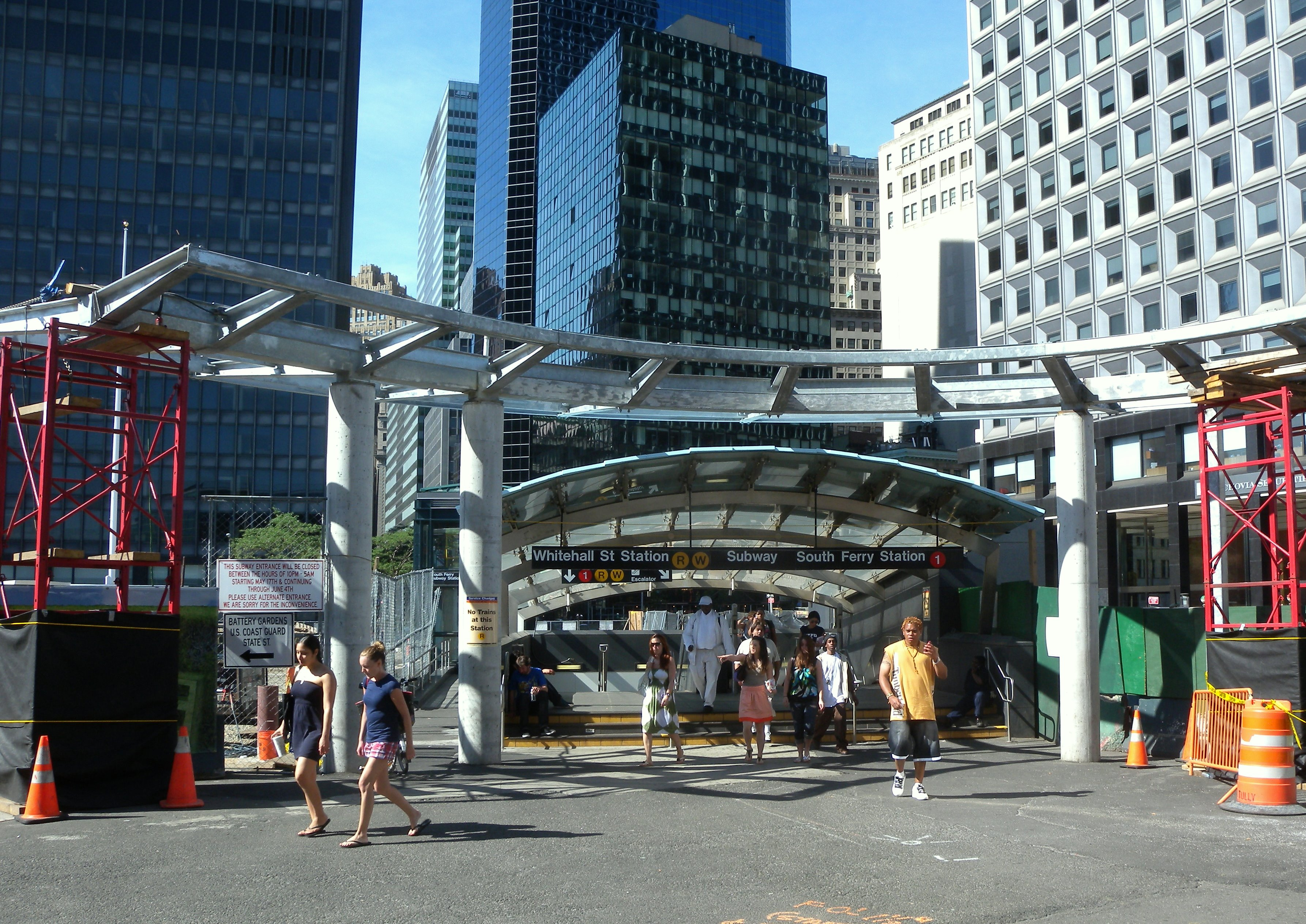
The second phase of the 1960s–1970s Second Avenue Subway project would have provided a connection between a new Water Street station and the existing South Ferry and Whitehall Streets stations.

The line's planned stops in Manhattan, spaced farther apart than those on existing subway lines, proved controversial, especially as the line would only have three stations in the borough north of 63rd Street. The Second Avenue line was criticized as a "rich man's express, circumventing the Lower East Side with its complexes of high-rise low- and middle-income housing and slums in favor of a silk stocking route." In order to cut down on walking distance, the stations would have been up to four blocks long. The plan for stations was reluctantly disclosed by the NYCTA on August 27, 1970 after a meeting with Assemblyman Stephen Hansen, who represented an area that covered the Upper East Side. Justifying the lack of stations, the NYCTA's chief engineer John O'Neil said that a station on the line cost $8 million which made it prohibitively expensive to build more. The stations at 34th Street and 125th Street were decided as they would be the terminal points, and the 48th Street location was decided because of a transfer to a proposed people mover that would take riders to other subway lines and the West Side. 57th Street was decided because of the large volume of crosstown traffic, and 86th Street had been decided upon because of the large number of high-rise buildings and stores in the area. These two stations and 106th Street were decided upon in a planning report.

People protested for almost a year over the lack of stations at 72nd and 96th Streets. In September 1970, MTA Chairman William Ronan promised to host meetings with members of communities along the Second Avenue subway's route. On August 27, 1971, a new plan for the line was unveiled with a Lenox Hill (72nd Street) station and an extension of the 48th Street station southward almost to 42nd Street. The 96th Street station was still not in the official plans, despite the proximity of the Metropolitan Hospital Center to the proposed station. In late 1971, in response to public outcry, the MTA announced the addition of a station at 96th Street, at a cost of $10 million. In the 1971 plan, several stations were stretched to give riders the impression that they were already in the station, while they would have to walk long distances in underground passages to reach the trains.

The line's planned route on Second Avenue, Chrystie Street and the Bowery on the Lower East Side also drew criticism from citizens and officials. In January 1970, the MTA issued a plan for a spur line, called the "cuphandle", to serve the heart of the Lower East Side. Branching off from the IND Sixth Avenue Line near the Second Avenue station, the spur would run east on Houston Street, turn north on Avenue C, and turn west on 14th Street, connecting to the BMT Canarsie Line. The subway soon became a political bargaining chip. Elected officials from Manhattan Community Board 8 protested the lack of stations in East Harlem. When politicians from the Lower East Side started advocating for the $55 million (worth about $437,000,000 in current dollars) Avenue C cuphandle, which would have served nearly 50,000 people, Queens politicians stated that the money would be better used to reactivate the abandoned Rockaway Beach Branch, which would cost only $45 million (equal to about $358,000,000 today) and would serve over 300,000 people.

On March 19, 1970, the Board of Estimate approved the connecting loop through the Lower East Side. The route was a compromise; a year earlier the board vetoed the Second Avenue Line proposal, and instead proposed that the main line go eastward from East 17th Street onto Avenue A and then curve onto the regular route at Chatham Square. The NYCTA said that it would cost $55 million more than a direct line and the transfer at Grand Street would have been lost. In addition, less riders would have been diverted from the Lexington Avenue Line under this scheme. Two services were planned to use the loop. Some trains from the IND Sixth Avenue Line would join the loop at Houston Street and Second Avenue and then swing around to 14th Street and Eighth Avenue. There would also have been a shuttle between those two stations.

By 1971, officials had still not confirmed any of the line's stations. The MTA was planning to only add thirteen stops along the line in Manhattan, with six of these above 34th Street; by comparison, the parallel Lexington Avenue Line had 23 stops in Manhattan, of which twelve were above 33rd Street. The reasoning behind this was to give faster service to riders from the Bronx and Queens, from where trains would funnel into either the new Second Avenue mainline or the existing Sixth Avenue and Broadway Lines. Disagreements over the number and location of stations were still ongoing, with New York Magazine advising readers to "get community support" if they wanted a station to be built in their vicinity. The dispute over the Second Avenue Subway applied between several disparate groups. Those arguing included residents of the Bronx and Queens who had poor infrastructure compared to residents of Manhattan and Brooklyn; the generally affluent residents of the Upper East Side; the ethnically diverse communities of lower Manhattan and East Harlem; the financial companies in Lower Manhattan; technical workers; the government of New York City; and the city's Board of Estimate.

== 1970s: Original construction efforts ==
=== Construction starts ===
Despite the controversy over the number of stops and routes, a combination of Federal and State funding was obtained. In March 1972, the entire cost of the section between 34th Street and 126th Street, according to the projects Draft Environmental Study, was estimated to be $381 million. In June 1972, it was announced that UMTA would grant $25 million for the construction of this section of the line. The MTA had requested $254 million in federal funds for the northern part of the line. Preliminary estimates of the cost of the southern portion of the line came to $450 million. The entire section was to be constructed using the cut-and-cover method of subway construction, in which a trench is dug beneath the street and then covered. 14,300 square yards of decking were to have been used to cover the trench, allowing for traffic on Second Avenue to not be interrupted. The entire line from Water Street to 180th Street in the Bronx was expected to be completed by 1980.

On September 13, 1972, construction work on Section 11 of Route 132-A, the section between 99th Street and 105th Street, went up for bid, and Slattery Associates of Maspeth, Queens got the low bid of $17,480,266. The MTA board approved the award on September 22, 1972. A groundbreaking ceremony was held on October 27, 1972 at Second Avenue and 103rd Street. Construction began shortly thereafter on the segment. Work on the initial segment was slowed down due to a network of uncharted utility lines below the street. The utilities, as part of the construction, were to be relocated under the sidewalks. Old footings from the Second Avenue Elevated were found while the section was excavated. Another problem in the construction of this segment was the large amount of ground water, which put enormous pressure on the tunnel. An underground substation was constructed at 105th Street, and five feet of concrete had to be poured for the floor so that the structure would not float in the muck. This section is 1,815 feet (553 m) long.

Construction costs for the entire line were pegged at $1 billion (about $7.697 billion today), and rose to $1.3 billion (about $9.428 billion today) a year later. In December 1972, the NYCTA started soliciting bids for the construction of Section 13 of Route 132-A, which was between 110th and 120th Streets in East Harlem. Bids opened on January 26, 1973, and the bid from Cayuga-Crimmins was the lowest of six bids. The contract was awarded on March 20, 1973, and, in that month, construction of the segment by Cayuga-Crimmins began at a cost of $35.45 million (equivalent to $272,855,000 in 2025). About half of this section was constructed through solid rock and therefore continual blasting was necessary. One worker was killed in the construction of this section. This section is 2,556 feet (779 m) long.

On October 25, 1973, the line's Chinatown segment, section 132-C5, commenced construction at Canal Street under the foot of the Manhattan Bridge. This segment, between Canal and Division Streets, was due to be completed by 1980 and was being built at a cost of $8.3 million (equal to about $60,197,000 in current dollars). The segment, which is 738 feet (225 m) long, was constructed by the Horn–Kiewit Construction Company. In January 1974, a contract, D-21308, was put out for the construction of Section 7 of Route 132-C, which spanned an area between 2nd Street and 9th Street in the East Village. Slattery Associates was awarded the contract in March 1974 with a low bid of $21,346,310 (equal to about $139,356,000 in current dollars). The job was expected to be completed in 39 months. On July 25, 1974, construction on the segment was started near Second Street. Another contract, for a Midtown segment between 50th and 54th Streets, was awarded that year for $34.6 million, with constructed expected to begin in the fall. However, construction never commenced. In total, construction on the Second Avenue Line during the 1970s spanned over 27 blocks.

The city also changed zoning regulations for areas located near planned stations, being first proposed in 1974 by Mayor Beame. New and existing buildings in these areas were required to build pedestrian plazas and arcades that would allow for the future construction of subway entrances. Permanent special transit use districts were created within 100 feet of the proposed stations. The line was designed so that Second Avenue could be widened at a later date by narrowing the sidewalks by five feet on either side of the street.

=== Construction halts ===
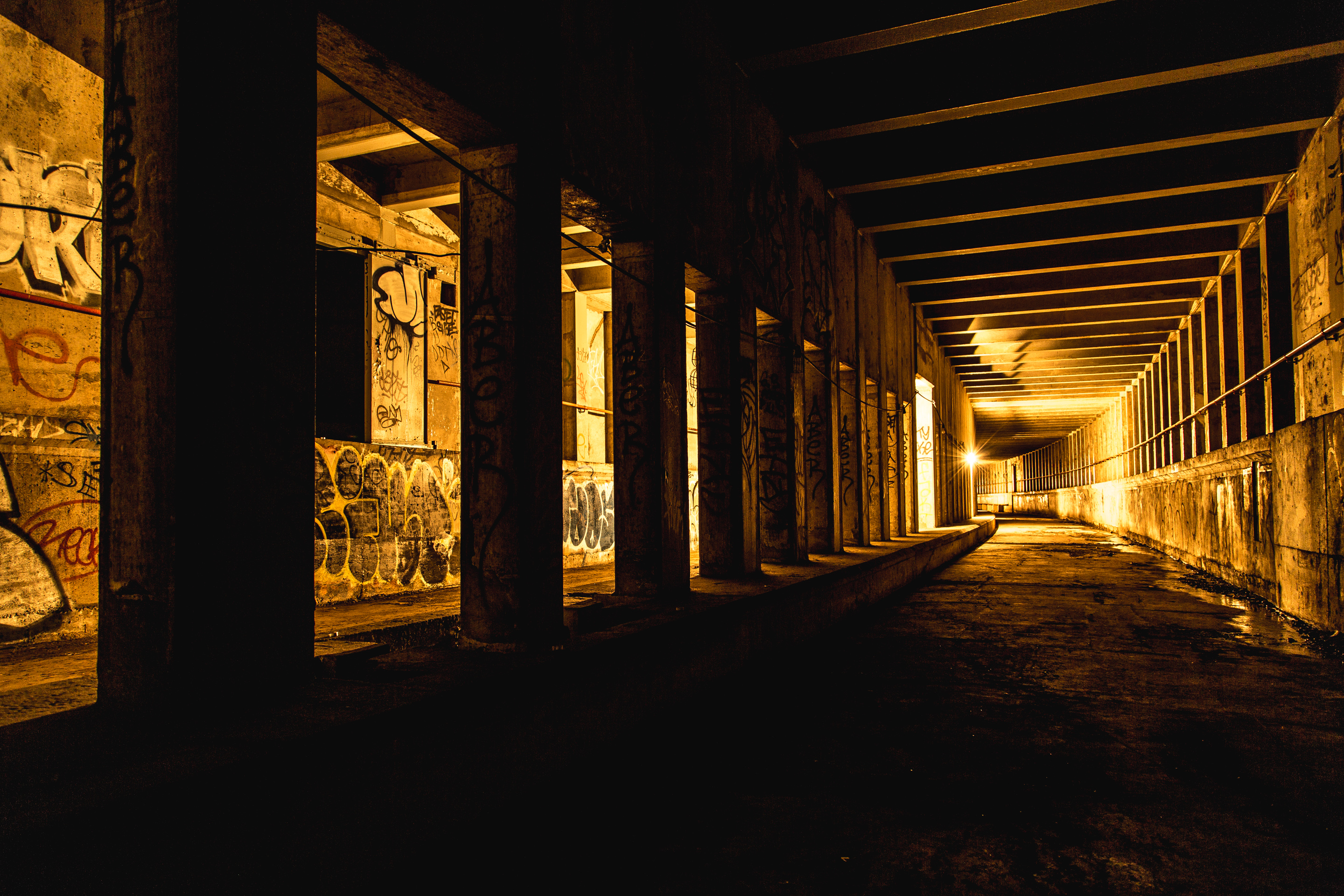
In the 1970s, three segments of the Second Avenue Subway were built and later abandoned. This is the segment in Chinatown.

In spite of the optimistic outlook for the Second Avenue line's construction, the subway had seen a 40% decrease in ridership since 1947, and its decline was symptomatic of the downfall of the city as a whole. A $200 million subsidy for the MTA, as well as a 1972 fare increase from 30 cents to 35 cents, was not enough to pay for basic upkeep for the subway system, let alone fund massive expansion projects like the Second Avenue Subway. In 1971, the subway had been proposed for completion by 1980, but just two years later, its completion date was forecast as 2000. Furthermore, voters had rejected a bond issue in 1971 that would have allocated $150 million for the line's southern portion. By the mid-1970s, a growing proportion of the public was advocating for the MTA to focus on existing maintenance, even as officials publicly expressed hope that some other source of funding would materialize for the Second Avenue Subway.

The city soon experienced its most dire fiscal crisis yet, due to the stagnant economy of the early 1970s, combined with the massive outflow of city residents to the suburbs. In October 1974, the MTA chairman, David Yunich, announced that the completion of the line north of 42nd Street was pushed back to 1983 and the portion to the south in 1988. On December 13, 1974, New York City mayor Abraham Beame proposed a six-year transit construction program that would reallocate $5.1 billion of funding from the Second Avenue Line to complete new lines in Queens and to modernize the existing infrastructure, which was rapidly deteriorating and in dire need of repair. The plan also used Federal aid to stabilize the transit fare. On December 22, 1974, the Regional Plan Association, a nonprofit research and planning agency for the metropolitan region, urged Mayor Beame to continue building the Second Avenue line, and the group described his decision to postpone the line's construction as a "serious error" that would waste millions of dollars. In June 1975, a public hearing was held concerning the MTA's plan to transfer funds from the Second Avenue Subway to the Archer Avenue Line project. In September 1975, Beame issued a stop-work order for the line. Construction of the line was halted on the section between Second and Ninth Streets, and no other funding was to be allocated to the line's construction. Besides the Chrystie Street Connection, only three sections of tunnel had been completed; these tunnels were sealed. The city did not anticipate that construction would resume until at least 1986.

By summer 1977, after construction had been halted for several months, residents of East Harlem reported that construction materials for the Second Avenue Subway were being stored on the streets, and open pits in the sidewalk had yet to be covered up. One engineer said that "we should be able to have things back to normal by spring 1978" if no problems were encountered. Several East Harlem residents filed lawsuits against the city after receiving injuries from broken construction materials or missing sidewalks, while retailers reported that the open pits encouraged thieves to break into their stores, sometimes by going through the open pits.

In 1978, when the New York City Subway was at its lowest point in its existence, State Comptroller Arthur Levitt stated that there were no plans to finish the line. During the 1980s, plans for the Second Avenue line stagnated. Construction on the 63rd Street Lines continued; the IND portion of the line opened in 1989 and extended to 21st Street–Queensbridge in Long Island City, Queens, but it did not include a connection to the Second Avenue line. In 1996, New York Magazine jokingly suggested that if New York City were to host an Olympic Games, there might finally be funding to finish the Second Avenue Subway. Of this failure to complete construction, Gene Russianoff, an advocate for subway riders since 1981, stated: "It's the most famous thing that's never been built in New York City, so everyone is skeptical and rightly so. It's much-promised and never delivered." By this time, the project was known as "the line that time forgot".

=== Segments completed ===
When construction on the line was halted in 1975, three tunnel segments were completed: one from 99th to 105th Streets (1,815 feet (553 m)-long) and a second from 110th to 120th Streets (2,556 feet (779 m)-long), both under Second Avenue in East Harlem, and a third from Division to Canal Streets in Chinatown (738 feet (225 m)-long), under the Confucius Plaza apartment complex next to the Bowery. They were not initially outfitted with track or signals. In August 1982, the MTA put out advertisements in national journals announcing that the two tunnel segments in East Harlem were being put up for rent for temporary use, and that the rents on the tunnels were to last seven years. After UMTA approved the MTA's plan, the MTA dispersed advertisements. The tunnels had no plumbing, ventilation, or access to the street, except through manhole covers on Second Avenue. To provide access to the tunnels, the MTA wanted to rent street-level rights that it had for subway entrances. The sole respondent to these advertisements wanted to use the abandoned tunnels as a filing cabinet. Over the next few decades, the MTA inspected and maintained the tunnel segments every two to three months, spending $20,000 a year by the early 1990s to maintain the structural integrity of the streets above, as well as to keep the segments clean in case construction ever resumed. Trespassers would often camp in the tunnels until the MTA increased security.

The tunnel section from 110th to 120th Streets was wide enough for three tracks. The 1970s construction plan did not include a station at 116th Street, and the middle track in that area was to be used for inspecting trains. As part of Phase 2, the section originally intended to be occupied by the middle track will instead be utilized for the 116th Street station's island platform.

A contract for construction between 2nd and 9th Streets was also awarded in mid-1974. However, it is unclear how much work, if any, was performed on that section.

== Construction of initial phases ==
With the city's economic and budgetary recovery in the 1990s, there was a revival of efforts to complete construction of the Second Avenue Subway. In 1991, then-New York Governor Mario Cuomo allocated funds for the line, but two years later, the MTA, facing budget cuts, removed these funds from its capital budget. In 1995, the MTA began its Manhattan East Side Alternatives (MESA) study, both a Major Investment Study (MIS) and a Draft Environmental Impact Statement (DEIS). The MTA Board committed in April 2000 to building a full-length subway line along the East Side, from East Harlem to Lower Manhattan. In December 2001, the Federal Transit Administration approved the start of preliminary engineering on a full-length Second Avenue Subway.

New York voters passed a transportation bond issue in November 2005, allowing for dedicated funding allocated for phase 1, which was to run from 96th to 63rd Street. A ceremonial groundbreaking took place on April 12, 2007, and the first phase opened on January 1, 2017, after several delays. The second phase, between 125th and 96th Streets, was allocated $535 million in the MTA's 2015–2019 Capital Plan; preliminary work began in 2023, at which point phase 2 was set to open in early 2032. Two additional phases, which would extend the subway south to the Financial District, are unfunded.

=== Use of existing segments ===
The modern construction plan for the Second Avenue Subway, developed in 2004, would make use of most of these tunnel segments. (Note: "Second Avenue Subway Final Environmental Impact Statement (FEIS)". MTA Capital Construction., first released in April 2004.) Phase 1 of service built new tunnels up to 99th Street, where the new tunnels connect to the tunnel segment between 99th and 105th Streets. The new tunnels between 96th and 99th Street are used for train storage of up to four trainsets, or two per track. Phase 2 is planned to extend Q train service from 96th Street to 125th Street. During Phase 2, both East Harlem segments will be connected, modified, and used for normal train service. In 2007, the MTA reported that the segments were in pristine condition. In December 2016, there were rumors that the 110th–120th Streets segment might go unused, though the MTA refuted the claim.

The fourth phase of construction will bring the Second Avenue line through Chinatown at an undetermined date. However, the tunnel under the Confucius Apartments is not planned to be used. Original plans that involved the Second Avenue line running at the same depth of the Sixth Avenue Line at the Grand Street station could have used that tunnel, but that option would require the use of cut-and-cover construction methods, which would disrupt the community and require the demolition of several nearby structures. Instead the MTA has proposed a deeper tunnel alignment in this area, including a new lower level at Grand Street, to reduce construction impacts on the Chinatown community. As a result, trains will be unable to use this tunnel segment; however, the MTA suggests that the tunnel segment could be used to store ancillary facilities for the subway line, such as a power substation or a ventilation facility.
