= Brit Insurance Design Awards =

Award established in 2003 by the Design Museum in London

Brit Insurance Design Awards, established in 2003 by the Design Museum in London, is the United Kingdom's pre-eminent design award with a £25,000 prize. The prize "aims to stimulate public debate about design and to raise awareness of its role enhancing the quality of daily life, and in its first three years was televised on BBC Two.

A judging panel made up of renowned design experts decide the best entries in the seven categories, with Individual category award-winners announced in February to then go forward to compete to be the Brit Insurance Designer of the Year, which is announced at an Awards Dinner in March.

== Exhibition ==
The Brit Insurance Designs of the Year exhibition, showcasing all the shortlisted designs is held annually at the Design Museum. It is an exploration of the most innovative, interesting and forward looking designs produced over the last twelve months from around the world and celebrated in seven categories: Architecture, Transport, Graphics, Interactive, Product, Furniture and Fashion. A number of internationally respected design experts are invited to nominate up to five projects, each of which, in their view, represents the best or the most interesting designs produced or launched in the last year.

== Winners ==
The winner in 2003 was Jonathan Ive, senior vice-president of industrial design at Apple, Inc., whose innovations include the iPod, iPhone and iMac. In 2004, the award was won by digital designer and artist Daniel Brown. In 2005, the museum courted controversy by awarding the prize to a Design Council official, Hillary Cottam, rather than to an actual architect or designer. In 2006, a humanitarian architect, Cameron Sinclair, whose work aided many disaster-ravaged communities across the world, was competing against a graphic designer, Jamie Hewlett, for his work on the popular Gorillaz virtual band. Gorillaz won the award. In 2009, renowned American street artist, activist and designer Shepard Fairey was awarded for his iconic "Hope" poster commemorating the inauguration of President Barack Obama. In 2011, Hulger and Sam Wilkinson won with their Plumen designer low energy light bulb.

== See also ==
- List of fashion awards
