= Poke =

Poke may refer to:

== Arts, entertainment, and media ==
- Poke (Ender's Game), a fictional character
- Poke (game), a two-player card game
- Poke, a fictional bar owner in the television series Treme
- The Poke, a British satirical website
- Poke (agency), a British creative, digital agency

== Food ==
- Poke (confectionery), term used in Ireland for an ice cream cone made of wafer similar to a waffle
- Poke (dish), diced raw fish tossed in sauce, popularized in Hawaii
- Poke (pudding), a Polynesian dessert, also known as po'e
- Poke cake, an American dessert made by poking holes into a baked cake and filling them with liquid ingredients

== Other uses ==
- Poking
- PEEK and POKE, BASIC commands
- Poke bonnet, a type of headwear
- Poke (Facebook), a Facebook feature
- Poke (Oklahoma State University), a nickname for an Oklahoma State Cowboys athlete
- Poke (surname)
- Poke language, a Soko–Kele language spoken by the Topoke people
- Virginia poke or pokeweed, a herbaceous perennial plant

== See also ==
- Pig in a poke
- Poke salad (disambiguation)
