= Plumen =

- Type: Privately held
- Industry: Consumer electronics
- Founded: 2010
- Founders: Nicolas Roope, Michael-George Hemus and Ronnie Renton
- Headquarters: London, United Kingdom
- Products: Plumen 001, Plumen 002, Drop Hat, Drop Cap, Drop Top
- Services: Energy efficient lighting
- Number of employees: 11-50 employees
- Website: www.plumen.com

Plumen light bulb

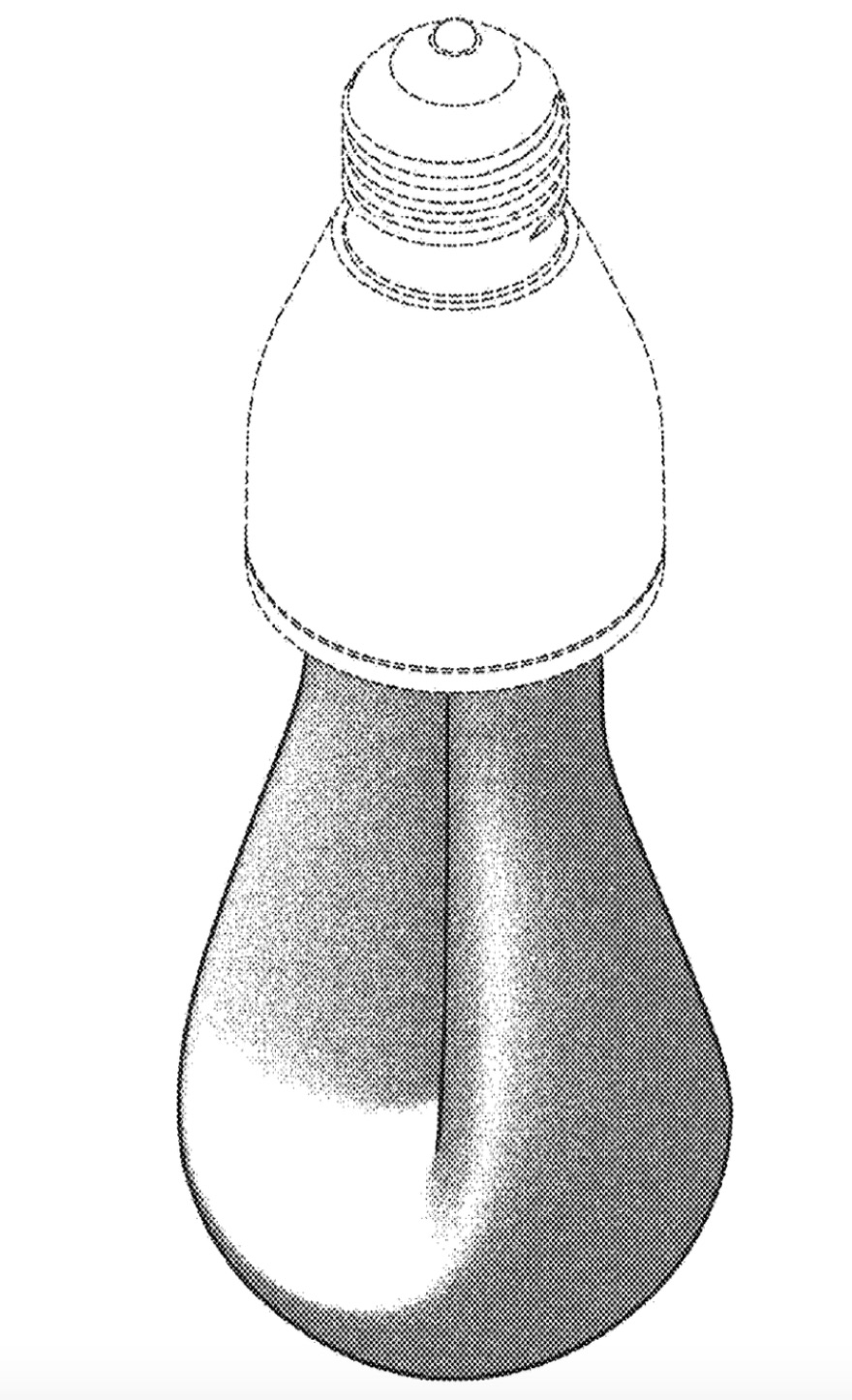
Image from US patent D738,545 S (Plumen 002 LED bulb)

Plumen is a designer low energy lighting company based in London, UK. The Plumen 001, their debut product, is a designer low energy compact fluorescent light. The design of the Plumen 001 lightbulb is result of collaboration between the Hulger team and designer Samuel Wilkinson. A prototype of the Plumen 001 has been added to MOMA permanent design collection, and has won Brit Insurance Design Awards 2011.

== Overview ==
The Plumen 001 bulb launched in September 2010 and was joined by the Plumen 002 that was launched on Kickstarter in January 2014. Plumen also produces accessories and shades to be used with their light bulb designs, establishing Plumen as an efficient designer lighting brand that sells in over 75 countries worldwide.

Plumen's designs and IP was sold to Creative Cables SRl in 2022, who continued to sell and develop Plumen products

== Product Range ==
The Plumen 001 is a compact fluorescent light which uses 11 watts to emit up to 680 lumens with colour temperature 2700 K (warm white light).

The Plumen 002 is an LED lamp which uses 4 watts to emit up to 245 Lumen with colour temperature 2200 K (very warm white light).

The Plumen 003 is an LED lamp which uses 6.5 watts to emit up to 250 Lumens with colour temperature 2400 K (very warm white light). The bulb was designed in collaboration between Hulger, British industrial designer Claire Norcross and French jewellery designer Marie-Laure Giroux

In 2016 Plumen also launched a lower cost range of designer filament LED bulbs under the brand WattNott.

The 001 and 002 lamp designs are protected by US patent D665,930 S and US patent US D738,545 S respectively.

== Awards and collections ==
- Museum of Modern Art (MoMA) Permanent design collection
- Cooper-Hewitt, National Design Museum Permanent design collection
- Victoria and Albert Museum Permanent collection
- MoMA Design and The Elastic Mind exhibition 2008
- The Art Institute of Chicago
- Helsinki Design Museum
- Brit Insurance Design Awards Design of the Year Winner 2011
- D&AD Black Pencil, 2011
- Homes & Gardens 'Eco Product of the Year, 2011
- Smarta Award 'Innovation' 2011
- GQ Best Stuff of The Year 2011
- Elle Deco Best Sustainable Design Award 2014 (Plumen 002)
- GQ Best Stuff of The Year 2014 - Plumen 002 (China edition)

== See also ==
- Accent lighting
