= Antirom =

Art collective

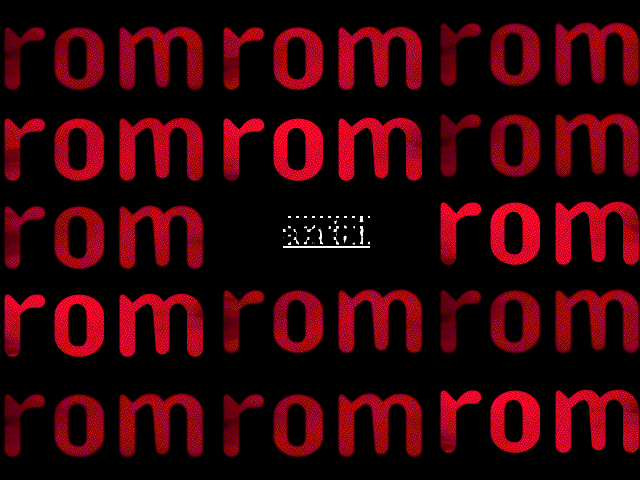
An example of an Antirom screen

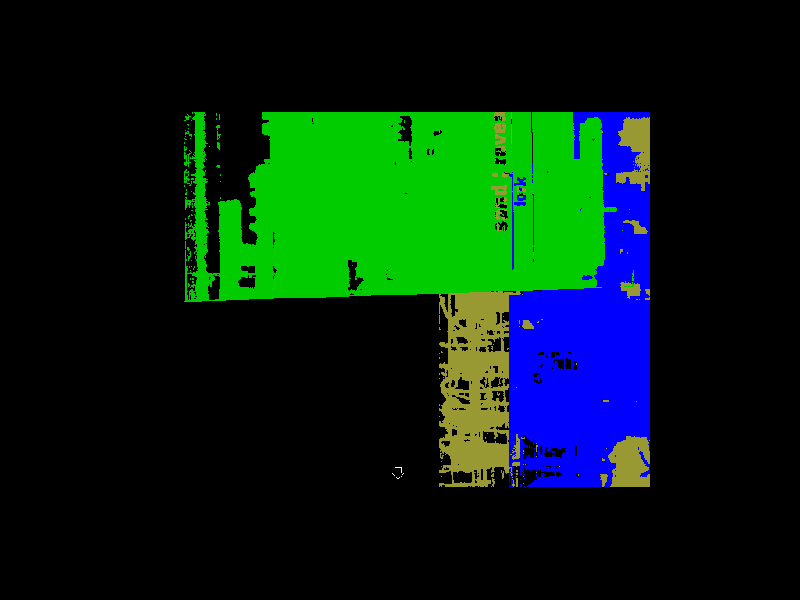
Another example of an Antirom screen

The Antirom team

The Antirom art collective was formed in 1994 as a "protest against ill-conceived point-and-click 3D interfaces grafted onto re-purposed old content - video, text, images, audio and so on - and repackaged as multimedia". Its initial and most notable project, the Antirom CD-ROM, was funded by Arts Council of Great Britain and focussed on exploring interactivity in its own right, rather than being an interface to existing content such as video, audio and text.

The group's process included producing many small interactive 'toys' that revolved around a single idea such as sound mixing, bouncing or scrolling elements. In the context of multimedia, at the time, this was a very different approach to the dominant "encyclopaedia" format such as Encarta. Antirom influenced several other designers such as Brendan Dawes who said of the group, "these guys changed things. Nothing was the same in the world of so called multimedia ever again. I remember seeing the amazing, different work for Levi's, which had a massive impact on me."

The Antirom CD used interaction techniques, such as using the mouse to control bizarre sounds and animations of random lines and colours, to create experiences that were considered confounding, entertaing and confusing. In his essay Cinema As A Cultural Interface (also a chapter in The Language of New Media), new media theorist, Lev Manovich, uses Antirom's work in HotWired's now defunct RGB Gallery to describe "how cultural interfaces stretch the definition of a page while mixing together its different historical forms".

Co-founders were Andy Cameron, Andy Allenson, Rob LeQuesne, Luke Pendrell, Sophie Pendrell, Andy Polaine, Nicolas Roope, Tom Roope, and Joe Stephenson.

Anthony Rogers, Helen Aver, Joel Baumann and Jason Tame joined the group later. Many of the members were students under Cameron's lectureship at the School of Media, Arts and Design at the University of Westminster. Tom Smith also introduced the team to new multimedia programming techniques in his role as visiting lecturer there.

Aside from continued experimental work and research, the collective produced commercial work for clients such as The Science Museum, the BBC and Levi Strauss & Co. Antirom in theory had a flat non-hierarchical structure with all collective members having an equal say in how the collective was run.

The group finally disbanded in 1999.
