= Poke salad =

Poke, Poke salad, poke salat, or poke sallet may refer to:

- Poke (Hawaiian dish), a dish made from marinated raw fish
- Poke salad (also known as poke salat or poke sallet), a dish prepared using Phytolacca americana

== See also ==
- Poke (disambiguation)
- Polk Salad Annie
