= Poke (surname) =

Poke is a surname. Notable people with the surname include:

- Bob Poke (1906–1989), Australian politician
- Greville Poke (1912–2000), British arts administrator
- James Poke (born 1963), English musician
- Michael Poke (born 1985), English footballer
- Robert Poke (born 1987), English rugby player
