= Tomas Roope =

British digital media designer (born 1969)

Tomas Roope (born 20 August 1969) is a British digital media designer. He is an Honorary Royal Designer for Industry, is in the BIMA Digital Hall of Fame, and has received an honorary doctorate from the University of Lincoln for his contribution to digital culture.

In 1994 Roope co-founded the Antirom artist collective as a protest against "multi-mediocrity, ill-conceived point-and-click interfaces grafted onto repurposed old content and repackaged as multimedia." Their eponymous CD-ROM, explored interactivity as an art form in its own right, inspiring many of the agencies that went on to form the UK digital industry centred around the Old Street roundabout. As Brendan Dawes says of Antirom, “nothing was the same in the world of so called multimedia ever again”.

The Antirom CD-ROM featured in The Barbican's Digital Revolution exhibition as a significant milestone in the history of digital creativity. Antirom continued until 1999 when Roope went on to co-found Tomato Interactive.

In 2007, Roope co-founded The Rumpus Room, a digital agency with a focus on co-creating immersive experiences with audiences. Clients included Lewis Hamilton, One Direction, Pet Shop Boys, Richard Curtis, Pharrell Williams, Coca-Cola, Nike and The X Factor.

In 2016 Roope became the Group Creative Lead for Google ZOO in EMEA, leading a team of creative technologists solving problems for top clients and agencies using Google technologies. His work included Fabricius, a hieroglyphics translator that uses machine learning to decode ancient Egyptian language.
