= Poke (agency) =

British digital creative agency (2001–2024)

- Formerly: Poke London
- Type: Joint venture (2001–2013); Subsidiary (2013–2024)
- Industry: Advertising, digital design
- Founded: 2001, London, England
- Founders: Nicolas Roope; Nick Farnhill; Peter Beech; Tom Hostler; Simon Waterfall; Ian Tait
- Defunct: 2024
- Fate: Merged into Publicis London
- Headquarters: London, United Kingdom
- Area served: United Kingdom, United States (2007–2013)
- Parent: Mother London (2001–2013); Publicis Groupe (2013–2024)

Poke (also known as Poke London, and from 2019 as part of Publicis.Poke) was a British digital creative agency founded in London in 2001. It operated as a joint venture with advertising agency Mother London until 2013, when it was acquired by Publicis Groupe. Poke's clients included Orange, EE, Skype, Heineken and Manchester City F.C., and its work, including self-initiated projects such as GlobalRichList.com, TeaBuddy and BakerTweet, received close to 20 Webby Award nominations over roughly a decade. The agency was merged into the integrated agency Publicis.Poke in 2019 and ceased to operate as a distinct brand in 2024 when the combined agency reverted to the name Publicis London.

== History ==
=== Founding and early years (2001–2013) ===
Poke was founded in London in 2001 by Nicolas Roope, Nick Farnhill, Peter Beech, Tom Hostler, Iain Tait and Simon Waterfall as a joint venture with advertising agency Mother London, which held a stake reported at around 50 per cent. Farnhill was chief executive, Roope, Waterfall and Tait were executive creative directors, Beech chief financial officer and Hostler chief operating officer. Poke opened a New York office in 2007.

Poke's clients during this period included Orange, EE, the BBC, Mulberry and Ted Baker, and its work spanned digital advertising, service design, user experience, e-commerce and product development.

=== Acquisition by Publicis Groupe (2013–2019) ===
In September 2013, Poke was acquired by Publicis Groupe from its four founding shareholders and Mother Holdings, for an undisclosed sum. Poke's New York office was not part of the deal: shortly before the sale, its founders completed a management buyout and relaunched the office as an independent company, Makeable. The London agency joined the Publicis Worldwide network in the UK alongside Publicis London, Publicis Chemistry and Publicis Blueprint, with its founding management team remaining in place.

=== Publicis.Poke and closure of the Poke brand (2019–2024) ===
In June 2019, Publicis London, Poke and content agency Arc were merged into a single integrated agency, Publicis.Poke, with a combined headcount of around 245 staff; Nicolas Roope was promoted to creative chairman of the combined business. He left the agency at the end of August 2019, ending an 18-year partnership with Farnhill. Nick Farnhill departed as chief executive in 2021 and was succeeded by John Hadfield, who joined from BBH Singapore. Charlie Rudd, group chief executive of Leo Burnett UK and Fallon, took on the additional role of Publicis.Poke chief executive in February 2023.

In April 2024, the agency dropped the Publicis.Poke name and reverted to Publicis London, the name it had used before the 2019 merger, along with a new visual identity; the change marked the retirement of the Poke brand after 23 years.

== Notable work ==
Poke's early work for Orange included Good Things Should Never End (2007), a continuously scrolling web page for its Unlimited tariffs built with animator Rex and coder Marius Watz, along with the campaigns Rockcorps (2009) and Glastotag (2010), tied to Orange's sponsorship of the Glastonbury Festival. For Orange's Pay As You Go range, Poke and digital agency i-level created The Orange Balloon Race (2008), a browser-based game in which players raced animal-shaped balloons across around 1,500 websites for a share of a group holiday prize; a later version, Orange: Balloonacy, won a Webby Award in 2009. For Skype, Poke and production company Pulse Films created Skype Outside (2010), in which artists in five countries responded to messages sent via Skype through public works of outdoor art.

The agency also designed websites for Alexander McQueen and Jamie Oliver (2005) and Topshop (2007), and rebuilt the Manchester City F.C. website, which relaunched in July 2009. Later client campaigns included EE's Bacon Don't Buffer (2013), featuring Kevin Bacon. Working with EE, Poke also created The Wembley Cup (2015–2018), an annual YouTube series produced with football vlogger Spencer FC in which content creators competed for a place in a squad that played a live final each year at Wembley Stadium; the 2016 final drew more than 21,000 spectators in the stadium and a livestream audience of around 275,000. Ted Baker's Mission Impeccable (2016), an interactive campaign made with Google; and Heineken's No More Excuses (2017), fronted by football manager José Mourinho to encourage fans to watch UEFA Champions League matches together, which included a Facebook Messenger chatbot. Other client work included French Connection's YouTique (2010), an interactive YouTube shop, and a Diesel eyewear film (2012).

As part of Publicis.Poke, the agency produced two campaigns marking the 30th anniversary of the Renault Clio in 2019: The Getaway, a series of football-themed idents for Sky Sports featuring Thierry Henry, and a trans-Channel love story set to a cover of "Wonderwall"; Campaign selected the latter as its Pick of the Week.

=== Self-initiated projects ===
Poke also produced several self-initiated digital projects outside client work. GlobalRichList.com, created in 2003 to coincide with a G8 economic summit and the publication of the Sunday Times and Forbes rich lists, let users compare their income with the rest of the world's population; Poke relaunched the site with live World Bank data feeds in 2013. TeaBuddy (2005) was office software for tracking whose turn it was to make a round of tea. BakerTweet (2009), a device that let a local bakery announce fresh batches of bread via Twitter, was exhibited in the Museum of Modern Art's 2011 exhibition Talk to Me.

== Awards and recognition ==
The Alexander McQueen website won Best Design at the BAFTA Interactive Awards in March 2005, and a D&AD Wood Pencil in the Media category the same year. More broadly, Poke's work received close to 20 Webby Award nominations over roughly a decade, including for its 2005 redesigns of the Alexander McQueen and Jamie Oliver websites, its 2007 Topshop website, Orange: Balloonacy (2009), and the Manchester City F.C. website (2010). Econsultancy's Top 100 Digital Agencies report for 2018 ranked Poke 48th, with reported fee income of £9.4 million for the 2017 financial year.
