= Hulger =

British electronics company

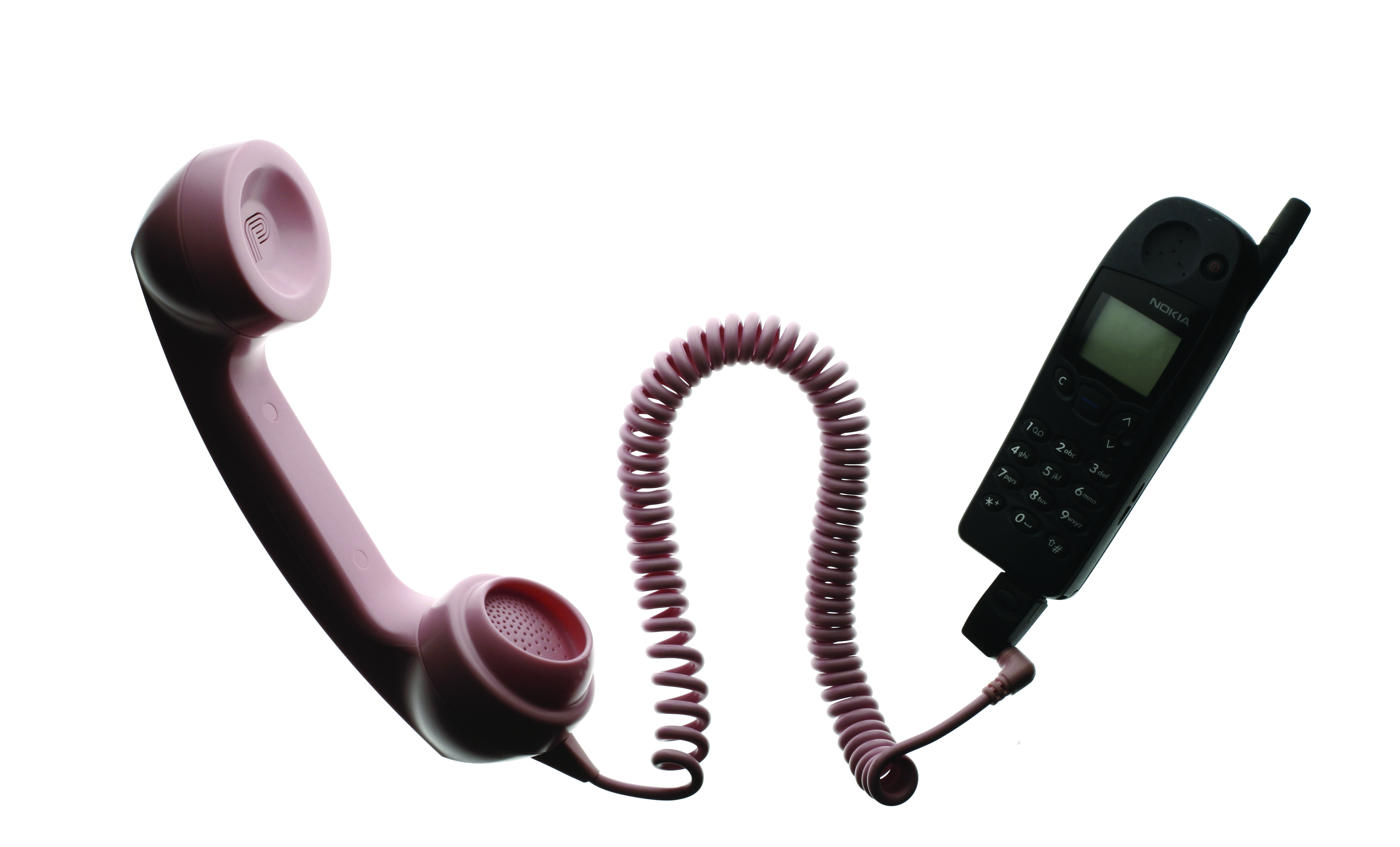
Hulger's first design of the P*Phone.

Hulger is a British company that designs electronic equipment. It was formed from Pokia after a trademark dispute with Nokia by Nicolas Roope and Michael-George Hemus.

The company was founded on the idea of old telephone handsets plugged into cellphones. It soon diversified, adding voice over IP applications. The handsets were designed to be intuitive. While Pokia handsets were modified existing designs, Hulger handsets were newly commissioned products, created specially for use. In late 2005 two Bluetooth models allowed wireless use with both cellphones and PCs/Macs.

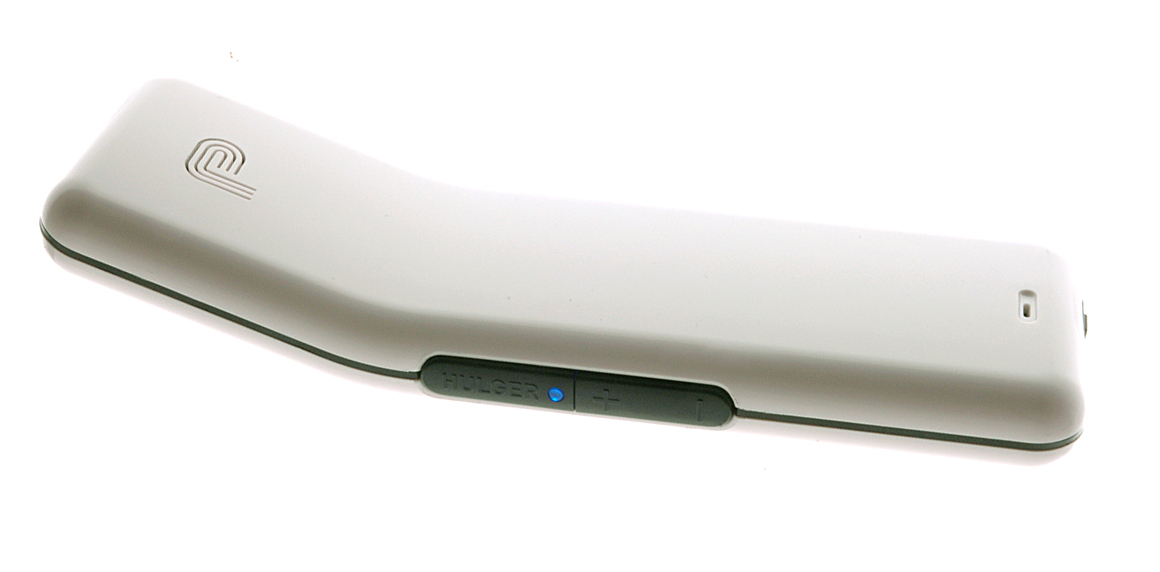
Hulger's Bluetooth Pip*Phone.

The company founded in London, England in 2005; the prior Pokia company was a prototype project dating back to 2002. The first production model was available to buy on 1 June 2005, and since then a number of new designs have launched under the label.

Hulger products have received both G-mark and IF product design awards.

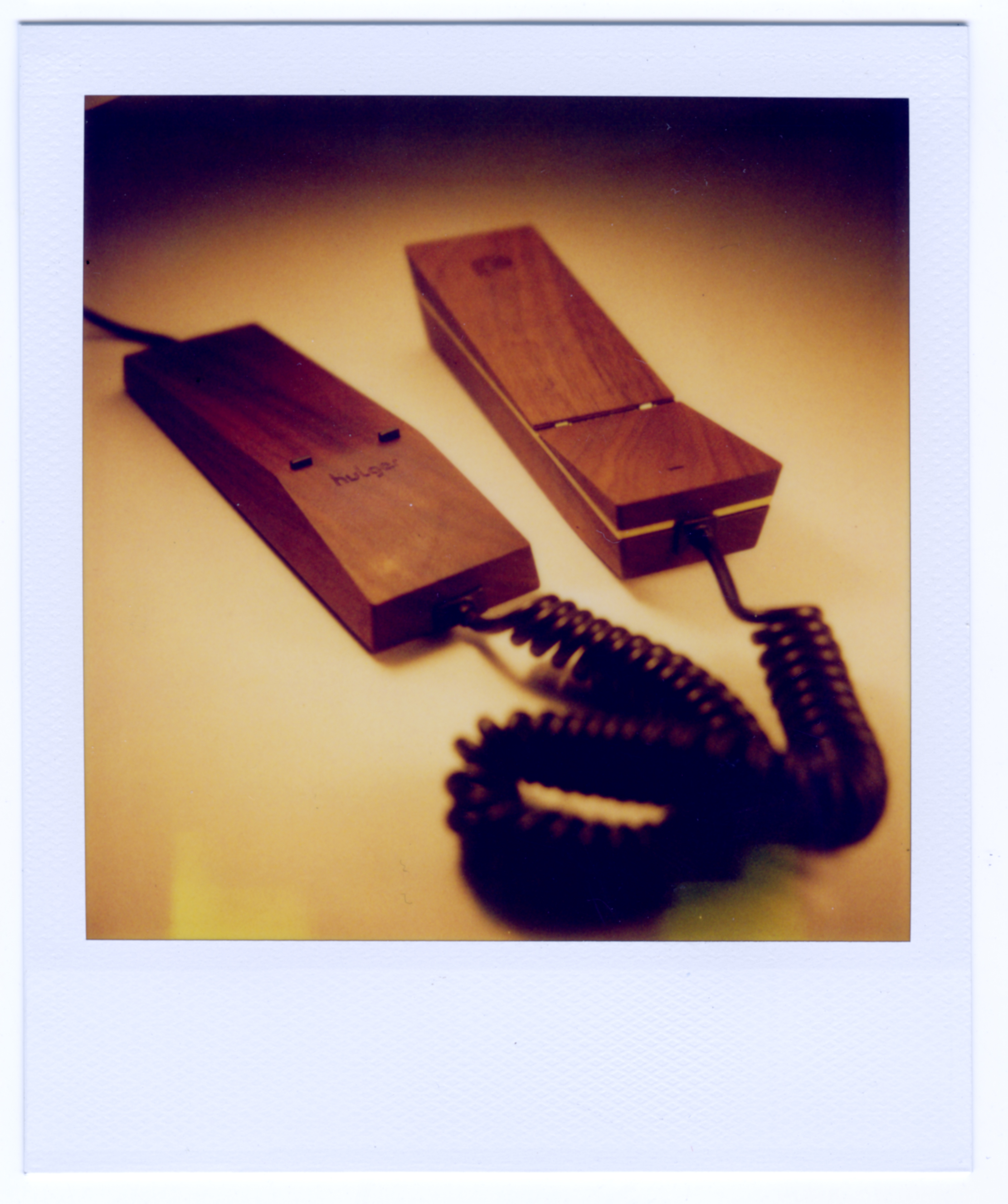
Hulger's Pappa*Phone, crafted from American walnut and brass.
