= Gene Russianoff =

American public-interest lawyer

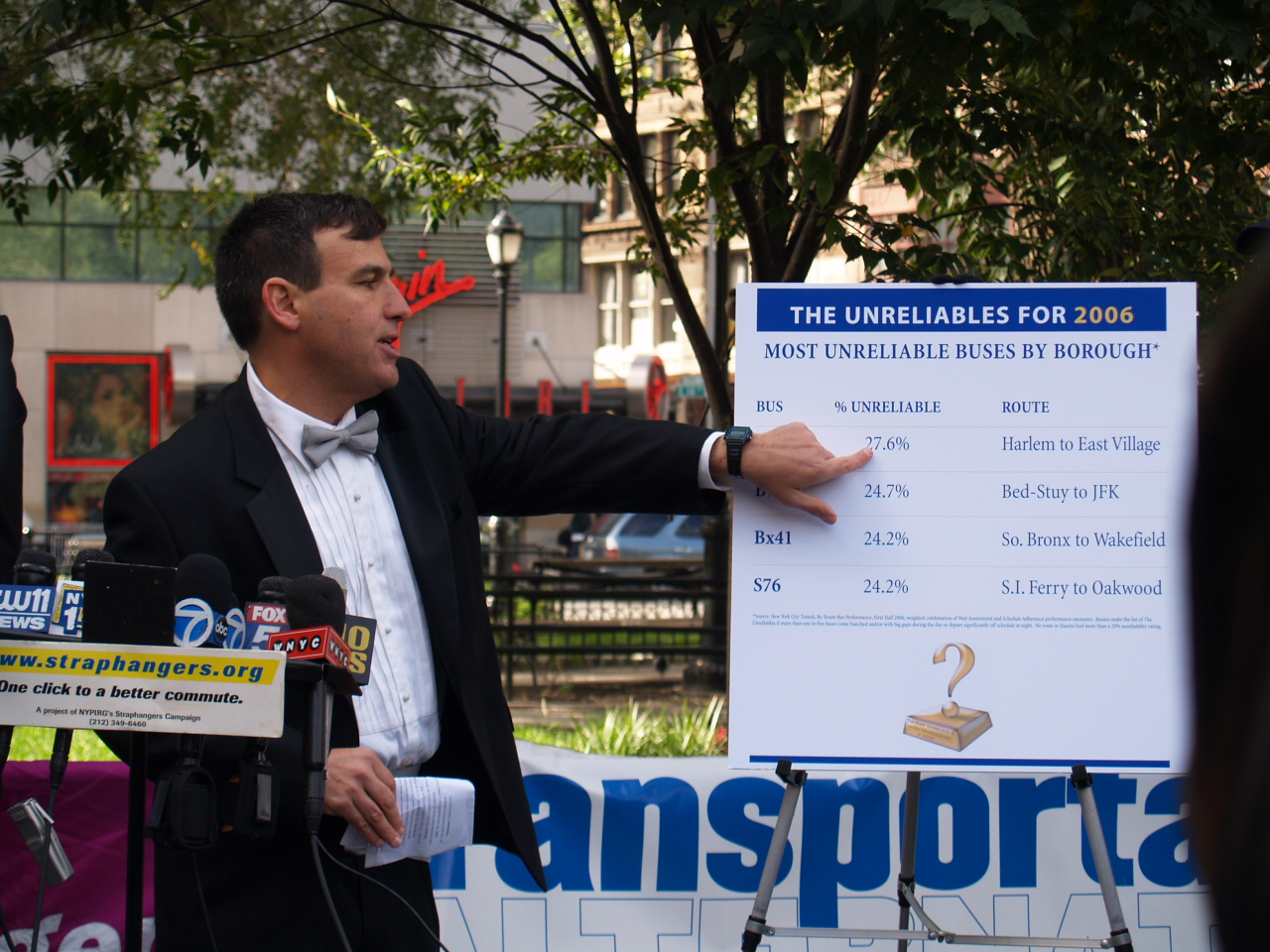
Outside New York Public Library, Gene Russianoff awarding the Pokey Award to the M42.

Gene Russianoff is staff attorney and chief spokesman for the Straphangers Campaign, a New York City-based public transport advocacy group that focuses primarily on subway and bus services run by New York City Transit. At the same time, Russianoff has also served as a government reform advocate for New York Public Interest Research Group.

== Education ==
Russianoff was raised in Sheepshead Bay, Brooklyn, and is a graduate of Brooklyn College and Harvard Law School. He has worked for New York Public Interest Research Group (Straphangers Campaign's parent organization) since his graduation from Harvard Law in 1978. In 1983, he was a Revson Fellow at Columbia University.

== Work ==
Gene Russianoff has advocated for subway commuters since about 1980. He lives in Park Slope, Brooklyn.

Since 2002, he has promoted in coalition bus rapid transit for New York City. BRT—whose current New York City version is called Select Bus Service—gives buses priority, resulting in greater speeds and reliability at much lower cost than new subway lines. To further awareness of the need to provide better bus service in New York City, Russianoff and Transportation Alternatives annually bestow "uncovered" Pokey and Schleppie Awards to the slowest and least reliable bus routes in New York City. The 2013 "winners" were the M42 and M50. They were clocked at 3.4 miles per hour (5.5 km/h), a rate described as slower than a lumbering elephant or a wooden row boat.

As a government reformer in 1988, he lobbied successfully in coalition for New York City's campaign finance law, now a model for Campaign finance in the United States

Over two decades, Russianoff helped win major improvements in the law. For example, the law now provides greater incentives for city candidates to seek small contributions from city residents; and also limits contributions from individuals doing business with city government. However, his coalition is still seeking greater restrictions on influence peddling by "bundlers."

Russianoff's work also helped result in the creation of the New York City's Independent Budget Office, which provides non-partisan financial information on budget matters. and the annual mailing of several million multi-lingual Voter Guides at city election time.

The multilingual voter guides and a new City conflicts of interest code were ratified by the voters in 1988 as part of a package of reforms proposed by a charter revision commission that year. In the following year, the IBO was included in the 1989 proposed charter revisions and ratified by the voters. In February 1988, New York City enacted a campaign finance law.

Currently, he co-chairs the NYC Transparency Working Group.

Since he developed Parkinson's Disease in his mid-50s, he has spent time lobbying for alternatives to Access-A-Ride, an M.T.A. service he claims is "lousier than the subways and buses.”

== Awards ==
Russianoff was awarded the 1994 Public Service Achievement Award by the National Board of Common Cause given to those "who by force of imagination, initiative and perseverance has made an outstanding contribution to the public interest." He was a Charles H. Revson Fellow at Columbia University in 1983. In 2010, he received the Distinguished Achievement Award from the Brooklyn College Alumni Association.

New York 1 News named Russianoff a "New Yorker of the Year" in 1997 for his successful coalition work to win unlimited-ride MetroCards.
