= Nicolas Roope =

British businessman (born 1972)

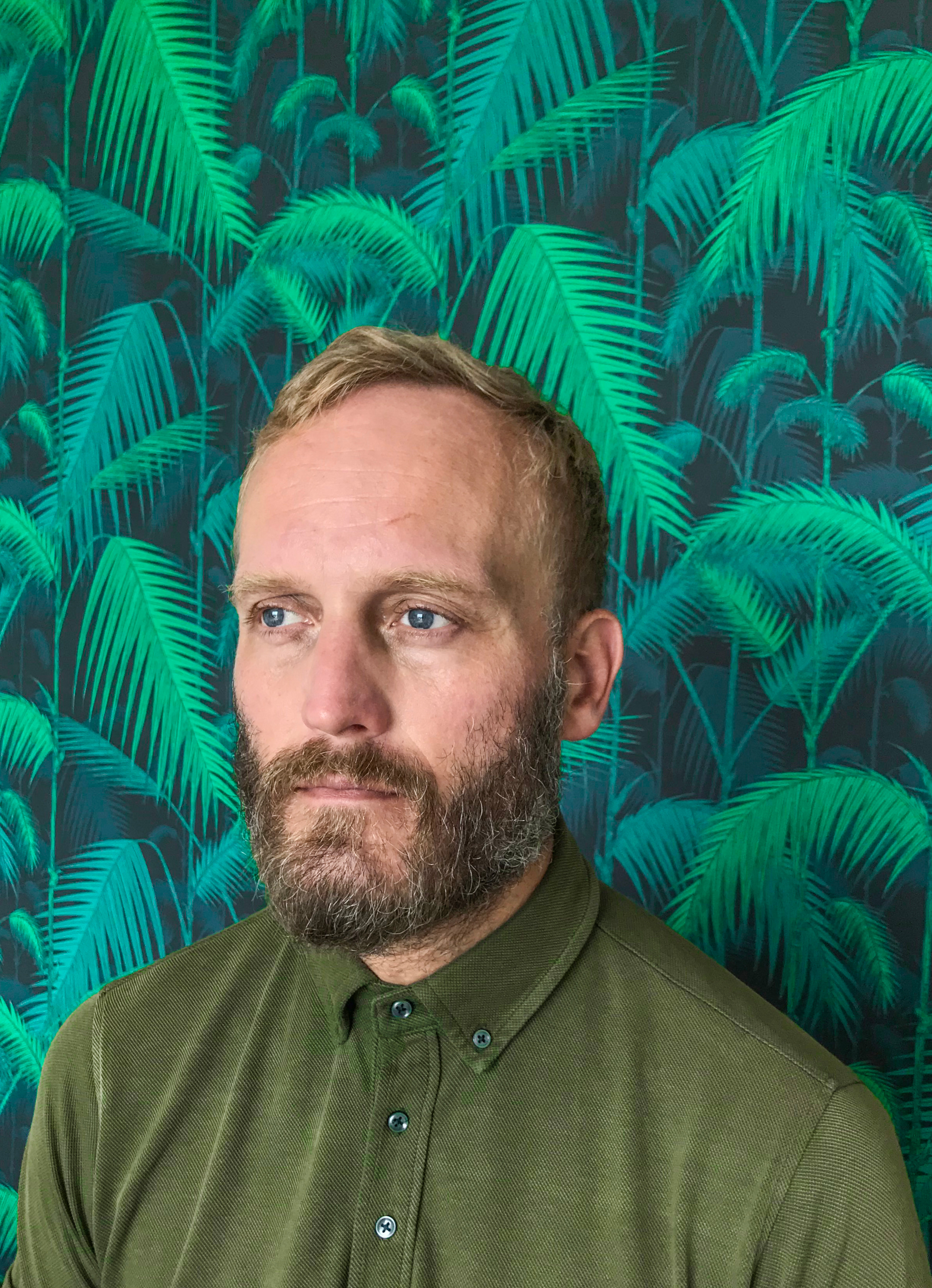
Nicolas Roope

Nicolas Roope (born 26 February 1972 in Singapore, Singapore) is a British industrial and digital media designer and entrepreneur.

== Education ==
Roope received Bachelor's degree in Fine Arts, Sculpture from Liverpool John Moores University.

== Career ==
=== Antirom (1994–1999) ===
Roope was a co-founder of Antirom, a London new-media collective formed in 1994 that produced experimental interactive work and commercial projects for clients including the Science Museum, the BBC and Levi Strauss & Co., before disbanding in 1999.

=== Poke (2001–2019) ===
In 2001, Roope co-founded the digital creative agency Poke in London with Nick Farnhill, Peter Beech, Tom Hostler, Iain Tait and Simon Waterfall, backed by advertising agency Mother. As executive creative director, Roope led Poke's creative output for clients including EE and Orange, Heineken, the BBC, Mulberry and Ted Baker. For Orange, Poke created Good Things Should Never End, a continuously scrolling web page promoting Orange's Unlimited tariffs, described by Roope as "a never ending web page" built with animator Rex and coder Marius Watz. Poke's work, including its redesigns of the Alexander McQueen and Jamie Oliver websites, earned close to 20 Webby Award nominations and wins over a decade. Poke's clients also included Skype, for whom the agency and production company Pulse Films created the campaign Skype Outside, in which artists in five countries responded in real time to messages sent via Skype.

The agency was also known for self-initiated projects, including GlobalRichList.com, an interactive tool comparing users' income with the rest of the world's population, created in 2003 and redesigned in 2013; TeaBuddy, office tea-round tracking software; and BakerTweet, a device letting a bakery announce fresh batches via Twitter, exhibited in MoMA's 2011 show Talk to Me.

In September 2013, Poke was acquired by Publicis Groupe from its founding shareholders and Mother Holdings. Roope remained with the business as executive creative director following the acquisition.

In June 2019, Publicis London, Poke and content agency Arc were merged into a single agency, Publicis.Poke, and Roope was promoted to creative chairman of the combined business. He left the agency at the end of August 2019, ending an 18-year partnership with Poke co-founder and chief executive Nick Farnhill.

=== Hulger (2002–present) ===
Roope's interest in retro telephone design began in 2002 with Pokia, a project in which he bought vintage telephone handsets and rewired them so a curly-corded old-style handset could be plugged into a mobile phone. The project drew coverage from the blog BoingBoing and a double-page feature in The New York Times' Home & Garden section, headlined "A Cellphone for Calling Butterfield 8" (8 July 2004).

The publicity led Roope and Michael-George Hemus to trademark and produce a proper handset; after Nokia objected to the "Pokia" name, the pair rebranded the company as Hulger in 2005. Hulger's first production handset, the P*Phone, launched on 1 June 2005. A later Bluetooth model, the PiP*Phone, won an iF Design Award in 2007 in the Communication Devices category.

=== Plumen (2010–2022) ===
The Plumen concept was first shown publicly as a sculptural prototype in 2007, under the Plumen name, as a Hulger project; Hulger said at the time it was looking for a manufacturer to put the design into production. In 2010, Hulger launched Plumen as its own low-energy lighting brand, with its debut retail product the Plumen 001, developed with designer Samuel Wilkinson and marketed as "the world's first designer low-energy light bulb". Roope has described the ambition behind the product as wanting to address how "the bulb, an object so synonymous with ideas, is almost entirely absent of imagination".

The Plumen 001 won the Brit Insurance Design of the Year award in 2011, chosen as the overall winner from more than 90 shortlisted entries at a ceremony held at the Design Museum in London. It also won a D&AD Black Pencil in the Product Design category the same year, and is held in the permanent design collections of MoMA and the Victoria and Albert Museum.

=== The Lovie Awards (2011–present) ===
In 2011, Roope and Farnhill co-founded The Lovie Awards, a pan-European sister event to the Webby Awards presented by the International Academy of Digital Arts and Sciences (IADAS), with Roope serving as founding chair. The awards, named after mathematician Ada Lovelace, were created to recognise digital and internet work from across Europe judged in its original language, rather than requiring English-language entries as most international digital awards did at the time. The inaugural ceremony was held during Internet Week Europe in November 2011, an event of which Roope and Farnhill were also co-chairs. Roope has continued to co-chair the Lovie Awards with Farnhill since leaving Poke in 2019.

=== Board and advisory roles ===
In 2012, Roope was named to the Tech City Advisory Group, a body set up to advise the UK government on technology policy and chaired by Rohan Silva, senior policy adviser to the Prime Minister. In 2021, he joined the board of brand purpose consultancy Given as a non-executive advisor and creative leader, working alongside non-executive chair Jan Gooding; Given merged with sustainability consultancy Anthesis in 2024.

== Awards and honors ==
- Juror, D&AD Awards 2011 (Digital Design category)
- Included in The Wired 100
- Included in The Adage Creative 50
- Plumen 001, designed by Samuel Wilkinson and Hulger (Nicolas is creative director of Hulger), has been included in MOMA permanent collection
- Winner of Brit Insurance Design Awards
- Good Design Award (G-Mark), Japan Institute of Design Promotion (for the PiP*Phone Bluetooth), 2006
- Awarded the London Design Festival's "Design Innovation Medal" in 2014
- iF Design Award, Communication Devices (for the PiP*Phone Bluetooth), 2007
- Inducted into the inaugural BIMA (British Interactive Media Association) Digital Hall of Fame, a class of 20 named alongside Sir Tim Berners-Lee, Sir Jony Ive, Stephen Fry and Martha Lane Fox, 2012
