= Straphangers Campaign =

NYPIRG's Straphangers Campaign
- Company type: Nonprofit
- Industry: Nonprofit & Activism
- Founded: 1979
- Headquarters: New York City, United States
- Key people: Gene Russianoff
- Website: Straphangers Campaign

The Straphangers Campaign is a New York City-based transit interest group that advocates on behalf of riders of public transport. The organization is part of the NYPIRG (New York Public Interest Research Group).

The Straphangers Campaign's main spokesperson and staff attorney is Gene Russianoff. "For three decades, Gene Russianoff, the staff lawyer for the New York Public Interest Research Group’s Straphangers Campaign, has championed the rights of subway riders," according to a 2010 profile in The New York Times.

The group's name is derived from the colloquial term "straphanger" for transit riders who gripped the hanging leather straps to keep their balance while the vehicle was in motion.

== Reports and surveys ==
The Pokey Awards, a product of the Straphangers Campaign, tells the public which bus is the slowest in the city. They have been announced annually since 2002.

The Straphangers Campaign also conducts annual surveys checking the performance of all subway lines. Key factors include timeliness, reliability (service breakdowns), seating availability, clarity of announcements, and cleanliness (dirtiness is colloquially called "schmutz"). A separate survey checks the performance of public pay telephones in subway stations.

In 2006 the bus "Schleppie Awards" were given to the bus lines that rated worst in "bunching," with major gaps in service (essentially, amount of deviation from posted timetables). The M1 bus in Manhattan "won", with 27.6% unreliability.

The Straphangers Campaign also rates the subway each year in a report called State of the Subways Report Card, ranking each service from best to worst based on their performances in six categories. The 7 was ranked best the most, winning seven times, including the first report card in 1997. The C has been rated the lowest the most, losing six times, last in 2012.
